= Classroom Crisis =

Japanese anime television series

- Promotional image

クラスルーム☆クライシス (Kurasurūmu Kuraishisu)
- Genre: Romantic comedy, Science fiction
- Manga
- Illustrated by: Masaharu Takano
- Published by: Media Factory
- Magazine: Monthly Comic Alive
- Original run: June 27, 2015 – February 27, 2016
- Volumes: 2
- Anime television series
- Directed by: Kenji Nagasaki
- Written by: Fumiaki Maruto; Keigo Koyonagi
- Music by: Yuki Hayashi
- Studio: Lay-duce
- Licensed by: Crunchyroll (Note: In Australia through Crunchyroll Store Australia (formerly known as Madman Entertainment).); NA: Aniplex of America
- Original network: TBS, MBS, CBC, BS-TBS
- English network: Aniplex Channel
- Original run: July 3, 2015 – September 25, 2015
- Episodes: 13
- Light novel
- Written by: Hajime Taguchi
- Illustrated by: Rin; Lay-duce
- Imprint: MF Bunko J
- Published: July 24, 2015
- Light novel
- Written by: Hajime Asano
- Illustrated by: Kingin
- Imprint: MF Bunko J
- Published: July 24, 2015
- icon

Classroom Crisis (Japanese: クラスルーム☆クライシス, Hepburn: Kurasurūmu Kuraishisu) is a Japanese anime television series animated by Lay-duce and produced by Aniplex. The series is directed by Kenji Nagasaki and features original character designs by Hiro Kanzaki. It aired between July 3 and September 25, 2015.

== Plot ==
Set in a future where interplanetary space travel has become possible, a space aeronautics mega-corporation named Kirishina Corp. has opened an academy on Mars, and a specialized class in that academy, named A-TEC (Advanced Technological Development Department, Educational Development Class) contains especially talented students, spending part of their time in class, and the other part of their time working to develop rocket engines.

The story follows the members of the A-TEC class, and their progress on developing a new engine, called the X-2, while dealing with issues related to both being in high school, and being company employees engineering rockets. The issues they will face include those stemmed from adolescence and those brought onto them from higher management.

== Characters ==
Nagisa Kiryū (霧羽 ナギサ, Kiryū Nagisa)
Voiced by: Yūma Uchida
A third-year transfer student and new chief of the patents development division, A-TEC. He is the younger brother of Kazuhisa and Yūji. After having a large amount of corporate success in various tasks around the Solar System, the company brought him to Mars to handle the disbanding of the A-TEC division. A-TEC, however, fights to survive, and he begins to be more swayed by their efforts. As time passes, Nagisa; after being rescued by Iris and Mizuki, distances himself from the Kirishina Group and founded his own company.
Kaito Sera (瀬良 カイト, Sera Kaito)
Voiced by: Shōtarō Morikubo
Kaito is a young senior engineer who is also a teacher at Kirishina Academy and homeroom teacher of the A-TEC class. He aspires to make a new engine with his students, His inspiration to keep A-TEC going and allow his students to keep working comes from the company's co-founders' humble beginnings when they were in high school. He gives off the impression that he can be easily popular with his students because he is closer to their age, but in fact, he can be annoying during passionate speeches.
Iris Shirasaki (白崎 イリス, Shirasaki Irisu)
Voiced by: Sora Amamiya
Iris is a third-year student and A-TEC's poster girl test pilot. She has incredible flying skills, but is not very safety-conscious and is known for her recklessness when operating any sort of vehicle. Mizuki is her closest friend and only joined A-TEC simply due to Mizuki's suggestion. Iris is generally pretty quiet. She is later revealed to be the real Nagisa Shinamiya after regaining her memories and appears to have been close to and had feelings for the current Nagisa Kiryū in the past. This leads to her competing with Mizuki for his affections.
Mizuki Sera (瀬良 ミズキ, Sera Mizuki)
Voiced by: Ari Ozawa
Mizuki is Kaito's younger sister, third-year student, and engineer in A-TEC. A member of her class committee, she hopes to follow in the footsteps of her late parents and become an engineer. She is friendly and generally positive. As time goes on, she tries to involve Nagisa in A-TEC's events and eventually falls in love with Nagisa Kiryu. They end up kissing in episode 11. By the end of the series, and after Iris regains her memories, she begins to actively compete with Iris for Nagisa's affections, though they remain steadfast friends.
Angelina (アンジェリーナ, Angerina)
Voiced by: Yū Kobayashi
A member of the accounting department. She is ordered by Nagisa to manage A-TEC's finances when the class runs into financial trouble and orders the class to move back into its original factory. She is also ordered to keep an eye on Yuji. Her real name is Hanako Hattori, something she responds negatively to when revealed. She seems to have feelings for Nagisa.
Makoto Ryōke (領家 マコト, Ryōke Makoto)
Voiced by: Minami Tsuda
Makoto is a third-year student who orders materials necessary for the construction of aircraft at A-TEC. She acts like an older sister and has a consistently calm personality that is present even in unexpected situations.
Kojirō Kitahara (北原 コジロー, Kitahara Kojirō)
Voiced by: Toshiyuki Toyonaga
Kojirou is a third-year student and A-TEC's aircraft designer. Though he acts mature around his classmates, he has a frivolous personality and tends to cause trouble. He is one of the few boys attending Kaito's class.
Tsubasa Hanaoka (花岡 ツバサ, Hanaoka Tsubasa)
Voiced by: Aya Suzaki
Tsubasa is a high-spirited second-year student who is in charge of A-TEC's PR efforts. She was selected for the position for her cheerfulness and excellent communication skills.
Sakugo Maioka (舞岡 サクゴ, Maioka Sakugo)
Voiced by: Takayuki Kondō
Sakugo is a second-year student and A-TEC's reliable IT supervisor. He has a nihilistic outlook of life and sports a hunch that gives off the impression of an otaku.
Yuna Nōnen (能年 ユナ, Nōnen Yuna)
Voiced by: Kana Asumi
Yuna is a second-year student and accountant at A-TEC. She keeps tight control over the budget, and is always giving A-TEC members a hard time for wasting what they have been allowed for rocket development.
Aki Kaminagaya (上永谷 アキ, Kaminagaya Aki)
Voiced by: Shiina Natsukawa
Aki is a second-year student and A-TEC's supervisor in engine maintenance. She is extremely enthusiastic about mechanics, but is known to be a workaholic in her field. She has a crush on Kaito, who she assists in his work.
Subaru Yamaki (八槙 スバル, Yamaki Subaru)
Voiced by: Yoshino Nanjō
Subaru is an androgynous first-year student at A-TEC, who is in charge of combustion-related experiments and is known for his distinctive style of clothing. He has a confident, impertinent personality.
Kaoruko Takanashi (小鳥遊 カオルコ, Takanashi Kaoruko)
Voiced by: Yui Horie
Kaoruko is a first-year student and operator at A-TEC. She is the youngest girl at A-TEC, and her timid nature and delicate constitution make her loved by all, to the point of being their mascot. She handles communication during prototype flight tests, though normally she's helping Makoto order supplies.
Kazuhisa Kiryū (霧羽 カズヒサ, Kiryū Kazuhisa)
Voiced by: Kazuhiko Inoue
The corporation's youthful representative director and president, whose managerial abilities are regarded favorably by other executives.
Yūji Kiryū (霧羽 ユウジ, Kiryū Yūji)
Voiced by: Hiroyuki Yoshino
A senior managing director of the corporation and Kazuhisa's younger brother. He bears an intense, deep hatred for Nagisa.
Seigō Sasayama (笹山 セイゴウ, Sasayama Seigō)
Voiced by: Tomomichi Nishimura
The head of A-TEC's advanced technologies development division and the principal of the technical high school.

== Media ==
=== Print media ===
A manga adaptation of the anime series, illustrated by Masaharu Takano, began serialization in the August 2015 issue of Media Factory's Monthly Comic Alive on June 27, 2015, with a prologue. It ended in the April 2016 issue of the magazine on February 27, 2016. Its chapters have been collected into two tankōbon volumes.

A novel adaptation of the series, written by Hajime Taguchi and illustrated by Rin and Lay-duce, will ship its first volume on July 24, 2015. A spin-off novel, revolving around the daily lives of A-TEC members, will also ship its first volume on July 24. It is written by Hajime Asano and illustrated by Kingin.

=== Anime ===
The anime television series is animated by Lay-duce and produced by Aniplex. Based on an original story by Montwo, the series is directed by Kenji Nagasaki and written by Fumiaki Maruto, with music composed by Yūki Hayashi. Art direction is by Takashi Aoi and Masahiro Obata, with Hiro Kanzaki providing original character designs. It aired in Japan between July 3 and September 25, 2015, on TBS, and later on MBS (Animeism programming block). CBC and BS-TBS. AnimeLab simulcasted the show in Australia and New Zealand, and Crunchyroll streamed it in the Americas, the United Kingdom, and Ireland. It was also streamed online on Aniplex Channel, Hulu, Daisuki and Viewster. The opening theme song is "Cobalt" (コバルト) by TrySail, and the ending theme song is "Anemone" (アネモネ) by ClariS.

==== Episodes ====
No.	Title	Animation director(s)	Original release date
1	"The Transfer Student Who Came in Late"; Transliteration: "Okuretekita Tenkōsei" (Japanese: 遅れてきた転校生)	Satoshi Ishino	July 3, 2015
As Kirishina company executives reacted and planned a response to news involving a hostage situation, another school day began for members of the A-TEC class, excited for a new transfer student coming in. Kaito Sera, the homeroom teacher for the class, raves to the academy president about their new prototype rocket, the X-2. Later in the day, it is revealed that the new transfer student is the hostage, and the class executes a rescue mission to the asteroid he is being held at, using the X-2. The mission succeeds, with the rocket being destroyed in the process, and the transfer student reveals himself to be the Chief of the Advanced Technological Development Department, Nagisa Kiryu.
2	"Classroom Downsizing"; Transliteration: "Risutora no Kyōshitsu" (Japanese: リストラの教室)	Takashi Kumazen	July 10, 2015
The students, especially Mizuki Sera, try to welcome and be friendly towards Nagisa Kiryu, only for him to be cold in response. He announces to the class that he is now the chief of A-TEC and that the program will end within a year. The next day, although Nagisa cancelled class, the students still gather and discuss Nagisa's history and speculate what his plans are. While watching a video where he was interviewed in the past, Kaito Sera becomes reinvigorated and storms into Nagisa's office to declare that he will do what he can to keep A-TEC going.
3	"The Woman Came From the Accounting Department"; Transliteration: "Keiribu Kara Kita Onna" (Japanese: 経理部から来た女)	Atsuko Saitō	July 17, 2015
Director Yuji Kiryu, Nagisa's brother, tells Nagisa that he has slashed A-TEC's budget by seventy percent, which Nagisa argues against. The students begin work on repairing the X-2 prototype. They then encounter Angelina rummaging through their office, and she interrogates and harasses them. Angelina later tells Kaito that she was summoned by Nagisa to reduce A-TEC's spending. She pressures Kaito into agreeing to the budget cuts, on the condition that she will not fire the students, and as a result, she moves their working space to an older, worn-down garage, angering the students. Nagisa discusses his secret plans with Angelina, and he realizes that Director Kiryu's seventy-percent budget slash was made up.
4	"Clash! Union Battle" / "Kirishina City"; Transliteration: "Gekitotsu! Yunion Batoru" (Japanese: 激突!ユニオンバトル)	Kazutoshi Inoue, Maya Kaminishi, Chiemi Kurosaki	July 24, 2015
With all but five members of the class leaving, the remaining students feel demotivated and powerless. By chance, Kaito is struck by the idea of bringing their problem to the labor union, which decides to support their cause. Kaito and the students begin participating in union events, but it soon becomes apparent the union is using Kaito's name in hopes of gaining political power. Nagisa promotes Kaito to Assistant Chief, rendering the labor union unable to help him any longer, and they leave him. Five more students return to A-TEC, inspired by the group's perseverance. They later find a loophole in company regulations that allows Kaito to use his executive promotion to acquire funds for continuing A-TEC.
5	"The Shame of the Journey Overrides"; Transliteration: "Tabi no Haji wa Uwagaki" (Japanese: 旅の恥は上書き)	Mika Sawada, Katsuyuki Yamasaki, Yuuki Fukuda	July 31, 2015
Director Kiryu is becoming more agitated by Nagisa's attitude and actions. The entire A-TEC class goes on a graduation trip to a beach, although Nagisa stays out of the fun activities to complete important company work. Whenever Mizuki tries to coax him into joining the group, the electronic devices he uses end up broken somehow. A standoff between Angelina and Iris reveals that Angelina knows of Iris's amnesia. Late at night, Nagisa is left with no devices left to be able to access the company server, so Mizuki steps in to help. She enlists Iris, racing fast against time, to drive Nagisa to a company branch office where he can access a computer and finish his work. Mizuki discovers scars on Nagisa's back later that night.
6	"Family of Shame"; Transliteration: "Jikuji taru Ichizoku" (Japanese: 忸怩たる一族)	Eisuke Shirai	August 7, 2015
Nagisa rejects a request for additional funding, telling Kaito that with his back against a wall, he should become more innovative. Later, Nagisa fails the class exams, criticizing the subjects taught in the class. Nagisa fails the makeup exams that afternoon as well, and decides to stay afterwards to attempt to study. Mizuki comes to offer her assistance, while Kaito goes drinking with A-TEC's former chief. Both groups begin a conversation about Nagisa's upbringing. Nagisa is not truly a member of the main Kiryu family, and his brothers treat him terribly as a result. Nagisa is also the last living member of the Shinamiya family, which formed Kirishina alongside the Kiryu family, putting Nagisa in an interesting position in company politics. With the help of the entire A-TEC class, Nagisa passes the makeup exams.
7	"Hanako Hattori's Longest Day"; Transliteration: "Hattori Hanako no Ichiban Nagai Hi" (Japanese: 服部花子のいちばん長い日)	Ken'ichi Ōnuki	August 14, 2015
While the students are finishing up the X-3 engine, they realize they need a final, very expensive piece. Angelina (a.k.a. Hanako Hattori) and Iris attended a pilot conference, but miss their flight back to Mars. Nagisa arranges for the two of them to board a private company plane, carrying a famous space engineering professor, Dr. Jason Li. Hanako and Iris realize the space plane has been hijacked, which they relay to Nagisa and Director Kiryu. Nagisa, doubting the director will handle the situation, asks A-TEC to save them. With A-TEC's help, Hanako and Iris secure the cockpit and set course for Mars. A hijacker tries to shoot at Iris, but the shots end up shattering the cockpit window. This triggers an old memory within Iris, becoming helpless as the plane veers on a crash course. Suddenly, an unknown plane saves them, while Nagisa is perplexed as to who sent it.
8	"Money, Elections, and School Festivals"; Transliteration: "Kane to Senkyo to Gakuen Sai" (Japanese: 金と選挙と学園祭)	Takashi Kumazen	August 21, 2015
With general elections coming up, the two largest political parties, Seimin and Oozora, use favors within Kirishina to rally support for their respective candidates. The students prepare their attraction for the upcoming school festival, a rocket being propelled by a pressurized bottle of water. While testing the rocket, Iris has flashbacks of a terrible memory, and becomes sick. Nagisa asks Iris if not knowing her past bothers her, and she responds that she has nothing to complain about. The students' festival attraction goes over fairly well. Nagisa and Hanako try to figure out why money budgeted for A-TEC keeps disappearing, and after meeting with Director Kiryu, his suspicions are confirmed, and he begins to set his plan in motion.
9	"Joyless Victory"; Transliteration: "Kanki Naki Shōri" (Japanese: 歓喜なき勝利)	Ichirō Sakosō	August 28, 2015
The day before the general election, Nagisa contacts Director Yuji Kiryu, telling him to turn on the TV and that his plan is now underway. The candidate for the Seimin party, Furabayashi, moved over to the Oozora party, to most people's confusion, with the party declaring their support for him, abandoning former candidate Murakami. Upon hearing the news, A-TEC's students feel like their souls have been crushed, as the candidate that pledged to support them is all but out of the running. Angelina reveals Nagisa's plan to A-TEC, showing that he persuaded Furabayashi to change parties at the last moment. Kaito berates Nagisa, stating that he's disappointed in Nagisa, and that Nagisa doesn't seem confident in his actions. Yuji Kiryu loses his position as director, and the CEO, Kazuhisa Kiryu, prepares for an oncoming battle with Nagisa.
10	"Director Nagisa Kiryu"; Transliteration: "Jōmu Kiryu Nagisa" (Japanese: 常務霧羽ナギサ)	Hideaki Shimada, Shin'ichirō Minami, Kazuyuki Ikai, Tomonori Ota, Noritomo Hattori, Kiyoshi Matsushita, Kazutoshi Inoue, Mihiro Iida, Kanae Hatakeyama, Eiji Kaneda	September 4, 2015
Nagisa is added to the board of directors, taking Yuji's spot. The A-TEC class comments on Nagisa's recent actions, unsure how to feel, while Kaito encourages them to continue pushing for A-TEC's survival. Nagisa discusses the internal politics of the board of directors with his collaborator, company Vice President Yanai, although some of Yanai's comments about CEO Kazuhisa Kiryu made him uncomfortable. Nagisa tells Yanai that to help overthrow Kazuhisa, A-TEC should be kept running. A-TEC's X-3 rocket has a test flight on September 26, but as Iris is piloting it, her repressed memories haunt her once more, and she realizes that she is Nagisa Shinamiya. The Seimin and Oozora parties unexpectedly decide to form a coalition, nullifying Nagisa Kiryu's trump card. As Nagisa calls a vote about disbanding A-TEC, none of his allies stand with him.
11	"To Each His Own Rebellion"; Transliteration: "Sorezore no Gyakushū" (Japanese: それぞれの逆襲)	Eisuke Shirai, Takashi Kumazen	September 11, 2015
While Mizuki begins to nurse Iris back to health in a hospital, Dr. Jason Li finds Kaito, and brings him to a secret research facility. CEO Kazuhisa tells Nagisa his plan to open a military weaponry division, but that he needs Nagisa, Kaito, and Dr. Li to manage it. He also reveals that Nagisa is not even a member of the Kiryu or Shinamiya families, and was instead a decoy as the real Nagisa Shinamiya escaped Mars. Iris, her memory fully returned, attempts to seek out Nagisa. The CEO tells Nagisa to forget his revenge plan and join his side, and Nagisa, lost in his thoughts, finds Mizuki and breaks down. Mizuki tells him they will struggle together, and they kiss. Nagisa and Kaito, not wanting to join the weaponry division, decide to throw a wrench in their plan and re-create A-TEC. Three days later though, Nagisa gets stabbed by former director Yuji Kiryu in a dark city street.
12	"Hope, Ambition and Despair"; Transliteration: "Kibō to Yabō to Zetsubō to" (Japanese: 希望と野望と絶望と)	Ken'ichi Ōnuki, Madoka Ozawa	September 18, 2015
Nagisa wakes up and finds himself in dark room, after that he is verbally abused by Yūji. Hanako goes to see CEO Kazuhisa in person, but she then realizes that only the A-TEC team members can solve this problem by themselves. ATEC's members have a plan to save Nagisa and try to put it into an action. In the meantime, in the process of investigating Nagisa's whereabouts, Kaito comes across a plan to "re-create A-TEC", a guidebook which Nagisa had prepared for a presentation, he then makes a plan to prepare for the presentation and to recapture Nagisa. By exploiting Nagisa's connections, Hanako heads down to Coldwood to look for a helping hand. At Kirishima warehouse, as Yuji tries to launch a rocket with the X-2 engine with Nagisa at Coldwood, the members led by Hanako come to Nagisa's rescue. In the console room, Hanako, who tries to stop the rocket launch, is shot by Yuji, leading to a failure of the plan.
13	"The Greatest Presentation in History"; Transliteration: "Shijō Saidai no Purezen" (Japanese: 史上最大のプレゼン)	Kazutoshi Inoue, Ichirō Sakosō	September 25, 2015
