= Momo Asakura =

Japanese voice actress and singer

- 麻倉 もも
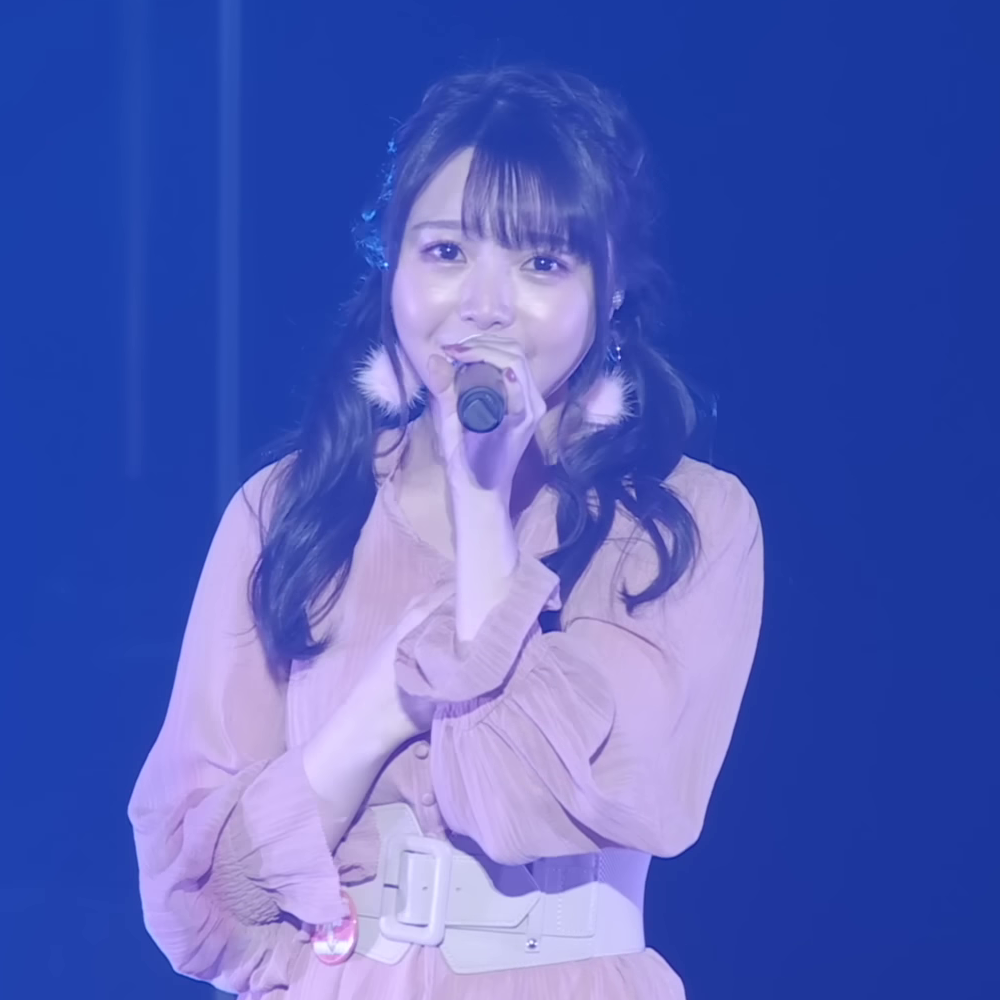
- Momo Asakura at HoneyWorks Premium Live 2021
- Born: June 25, 1994 (age 32); Fukuoka Prefecture, Japan
- Occupations: Voice actress; singer
- Years active: 2012–present
- Employer: Music Ray'n
- Height: 156 cm (5 ft 1 in)
- Musical career
- Genres: J-pop; anison
- Instrument: Vocals
- Years active: 2016–present
- Label: Sony Music Entertainment Japan/Music Ray'n
- Member of: TrySail

Momo Asakura (麻倉 もも, Asakura Momo; born June 25, 1994) is a Japanese voice actress and singer. She is part of the Music Ray'n agency. After passing an audition held by Music Ray'n, she made her voice acting debut as Yumi in the anime My Little Monster. She played her first main role as Ayumi Otosaka in the anime television series Charlotte. She is a member of the voice acting unit TrySail, alongside Sora Amamiya and Shiina Natsukawa. Apart from voice acting, she also performed theme song for various anime she acted in.

== Biography ==
Asakura's interest in becoming a voice actress began in middle school and continued through high school. She got her break in 2011 when, together with Sora Amamiya and Shiina Natsukawa, passed an audition held by Sony Music Entertainment Japan's sub-label Music Ray'n. She made her voice acting debut in 2012, voicing the character Yumi in the anime My Little Monster. Since then, she was given minor roles in various anime.

In 2014, she was cast as Sumi Otokawa in Sakura Trick, Rin Kazari in Witch Craft Works. She and other cast members performed the series' ending theme "Witch☆Activity". On December 21, 2014, it was announced that Asakura, Amamiya, and Natsukawa would be forming the voice acting unit TrySail, which released its first single "Youthful Dreamer", used as the opening theme song for the anime television series Ultimate Otaku Teacher, on May 13, 2015. That same year, she was cast as Ayumi Otosaka in the anime television series Charlotte becoming her first main role. She then played the role of Manako in Monster Musume, and Yuyu Aizawa in Aria the Scarlet Ammo AA.

In 2016, she made her official debut as a solo artist for Music Ray'n by releasing her first single "Ashita wa Kimi to." (明日は君と) which was used as an insert song for the anime film Suki ni Naru Sono Shunkan o: Kokuhaku Jikkō Iinkai. The song peak at number 8 on the Oricon weekly charts. Her first solo album Peachy! was released on October 3, 2018; the album peaked at number 6 on the Oricon weekly charts. The following year, she was cast as Rona Pricipa O'Lapanesta in Endro!, and Nagisa Kashiwagi in Kaguya-sama: Love Is War.

== Filmography ==
=== Anime ===
List of voice performances in anime
Year	Title	Role	Notes	Source
2012	My Little Monster	Yumi	Ep. 9	
2013	A Certain Scientific Railgun S	Minori	Ep. 7	
2013	Karneval	Girl	Ep. 11	
2013	Aikatsu!	Rion	Ep. 42	
2013	Walkure Romanze: Shōjo Kishi Monogatari	School girl C	Ep. 4	
2014	Witch Craft Works	Rin Kazari		
2014	Sakura Trick	Sumi Otokawa, student		
2014	Noragami	Student B	Ep. 2	
2014	Hamatora: The Animation	Female student B	Ep. 8	
2014	Bladedance of Elementalers	Vitte	Ep. 9	
2014	Sword Art Online II	High school girl	Ep. 24	
2015	Ultimate Otaku Teacher	Ayaka	Ep. 6	
2015	Fairy Tail	Lummy		
2015–2016	Charlotte	Ayumi Otosaka	Also OVA	
2015–2017	Monster Musume	Manako	Also OVA	
2015	Gate: Jieitai Kano Chi nite, Kaku Tatakaeri	Aurea	Ep. 7	
2015	Aria the Scarlet Ammo AA	Yuyu Aizawa		
2016	Kuromukuro	Koharu Shirahane		
2016–2017	High School Fleet	Mikan Irako	Also OVA	
2016	WWW.Working!!	Miri Yanagiba		
2017	PriPri Chi-chan!!	Yuka Saeki		
2017	Interviews with Monster Girls	Shouko Hasegawa	Ep. 13	
2019	Endro!	Rona Pricipa O'Lapanesta		
2019–present	Kaguya-sama: Love Is War	Nagisa Kashiwagi		
2019	O Maidens in Your Savage Season	Momoko Sudō		
2020–2022	Magia Record: Puella Magi Madoka Magica Side Story	Iroha Tamaki		
2020–2022	Science Fell in Love, So I Tried to Prove It	Rikekuma		
2021–2023	Horimiya	Honoka Sawada	Also The Missing Pieces	
2021	Idoly Pride	Yū Suzumura		
2022	Akebi's Sailor Uniform	Hotaru Hiraiwa		
2022	Heroines Run the Show	Hina Setoguchi		
2022	Arknights: Prelude to Dawn	Medic		
2023	Zom 100: Bucket List of the Dead	Maki		
2023	Protocol: Rain	Mio Tokinoya		
2024	Demon Lord, Retry! R	Aku		
2025	With Vengeance, Sincerely, Your Broken Saintess	Arianne Treviers		

=== Films ===
List of voice performances in feature films
Year	Title	Role	Notes	Source
2014	The Idolmaster Movie: Beyond the Brilliant Future!	Serika Hakozaki		
2015	Love Live! The School Idol Movie	School idol		
2016	Zutto Mae Kara Suki Deshita: Kokuhaku Jikkou Iinkai	Hina Setoguchi		
2016	Suki ni Naru Sono Shunkan o: Kokuhaku Jikkō Iinkai	Hina Setoguchi		
2020	High School Fleet: The Movie	Mikan Irako		
2020	The Island of Giant Insects	Miura Mami		
2022	Kaguya-sama: Love Is War – The First Kiss That Never Ends	Nagisa Kashiwagi		

=== Video games ===
List of voice performances in video games
Year	Title	Role	Notes	Source
2012	Girl Friend Beta	Yuki Hanafusa	iOS, Android	
2013	The Idolmaster Million Live!	Serika Hakozaki	iOS, Android	
2014	The Idolmaster One For All	Serika Hakozaki	PS3	
2014	Freedom Wars	Anne "Charm" Vito	PS Vita	
2015	School Fanfare	Kotone Genshouin	iOS, Android	
2017	The Idolmaster: Million Live! Theater Days	Serika Hakozaki	iOS, Android	
2017	Magia Record: Puella Magi Madoka Magica Side Story	Iroha Tamaki	iOS, Android	
2018	Dragalia Lost	Daikokuten	iOS, Android	
2021	Idoly Pride	Yu Suzumura	iOS, Android	
2022	Azur Lane	Prinz Rupprecht	iOS, Android	
2022	The Centennial Case: A Shijima Story	Kanako	Nintendo Switch, PlayStation 5, PlayStation 4, iOS, Android, Microsoft Windows	
2024	Panic in Sweets Land	Purffee	Nintendo Switch, PC	
2024	Touhou Spell Carnival	Flandre Scarlet	Nintendo Switch, PlayStation 5, PlayStation4	

== Discography ==
=== Albums ===
List of albums, with selected chart positions
Title	Album details	Catalogue No.		Oricon	
Title	Album details	Regular edition	Limited edition	Peak position	Weeks charted
Peachy!	Released: October 3, 2018; Label: Music Ray'n; Format: CD, CD + DVD, CD + Blu-ray, digital download	SMCL-565	SMCL-561/2 (CD+DVD); SMCL-563/4 (CD+Blu-ray)	6	4
Agapanthus	Released: April 8, 2020; Label: Music Ray'n; Format: CD, CD + DVD, CD + Blu-ray, digital download	SMCL-655	SMCL-650/1 (CD+DVD); SMCL-653/4 (CD+Blu-ray)	5	5
Apiacere	Released: July 17, 2022; Label: Music Ray'n; Format: CD, CD + DVD, CD + Blu-ray, digital download	SMCL-779	SMCL-774/5 (CD+DVD); SMCL-776/8 (CD+Blu-ray)	10	5
ChouChou	Released: August 21, 2024; Label: Music Ray'n; Format: CD, CD + DVD, CD + Blu-ray, digital download	SMCL-912	SMCL-907/9 (CD+DVD); SMCL-910/1 (CD+Blu-ray)	15	3
Momo Asakura Best Album "Relier"	Released: November 4, 2026; Label: Music Ray'n; Format: 2×CD, 2×CD + Blu-ray, digital download		SMCL-1004/5	21	—

=== Singles ===
List of singles, with selected chart positions
Release date	Title	Catalogue No. (Regular edition)	Oricon		Album	Notes
Release date	Title	Catalogue No. (Regular edition)	Peak position	Weeks charted	Album	Notes
November 2, 2016	"Ashita wa Kimi to." (明日は君と。)	SMCL-456	8	7	Peachy!	Insert song for Suki ni Naru Sono Shunkan o: Kokuhaku Jikkō Iinkai
June 7, 2017	"Tokubetsu Ichiban!!" (トクベツいちばん!!)	SMCL-485	11	4	Peachy!	1st opening theme song for PriPri Chi-chan!!
November 1, 2017	"Colorful" (カラフル)	SMCL-517	7	3	Peachy!	3rd opening theme song for PriPri Chi-chan!!
August 22, 2018	"Pumpkin Meat Pie" (パンプキン・ミート・パイ)	SMCL-554	11	3	Peachy!	—N/a
February 13, 2019	"365×LOVE"	SMCL-593	14	1	Agapanthus	—N/a
May 22, 2019	"Smash Drop" (スマッシュ・ドロップ)	SMCL-602	6	1	Agapanthus	3rd ending theme song for PazuDora
September 4, 2019	"Yume Cinderella" (ユメシンデレラ)	SMCL-616	15	1	Agapanthus	Ending theme song for O Maidens in Your Savage Season
November 11, 2020	"Boku Dake ni Mieru Hoshi" (僕だけに見える星)	SMCL-678	8	3	Apiacere	—N/a
August 18, 2021	"Pinky Hook" (ピンキーフック)	SMCL-722	9	5	Apiacere	Ending theme song for Girlfriend, Girlfriend
March 2, 2022	"Saishiki Garasu" (彩色硝子)	SMCL-755	10	3	Apiacere	—N/a
August 16, 2023	"Shuwawa!" (シュワワ!)	SMCL-828	17	3	ChouChou	—N/a
February 14, 2024	"Sweet Essence"	SMCL-862	12	4	ChouChou	—N/a
May 15, 2024	"Libra"	SMCL-892	15	3	ChouChou	—N/a
