= PriPri Chi-chan!! =

Japanese manga series

- First tankōbon volume cover

プリプリちぃちゃん!! (Puripuri Chiichan!!)
- Genre: Comedy
- Manga
- Written by: Hiromu Shinozuka
- Published by: Shogakukan
- Magazine: Ciao
- Original run: April 2015 – April 2019
- Volumes: 7
- Anime television series
- Directed by: Takahiro Ikezoe
- Written by: Michihiro Tsuchiya
- Music by: Takatsugu Wakabayashi
- Studio: OLM, Inc.
- Original network: MBS TBS
- Original run: April 15, 2017 – December 16, 2017
- Episodes: 36

PriPri Chi-chan!! (プリプリちぃちゃん!!) is a Japanese manga series written and illustrated by Hiromu Shinozuka. The series began publication in Shogakukan's Ciao manga magazine in April 2015. An anime television series by OLM, Inc. started airing in Japan from April to December 2017.

In 2018, PriPri Chi-chan!! won the 63rd Shogakukan Manga Award in the Kodomo category.

== Plot ==
An underground-dweller named Chi-chan wanted to come to the human world in search for sweets. After he finished his objective and he wanted to come back to his home, he would be stuck on the hole where he came from. He would then be saved by a girl named Yuka Saeki, who dug the hole where Chi-chan was stuck back there, and would then take care of Chi-chan in her home.

== Characters ==
=== Humans ===
Yuka Saeki (佐伯 夕花, Saeki Yuka)
Voiced by: Momo Asakura
The human protagonist. A girl that has a gentle personality and cannot resist to help someone in need. She is currently on second grade of middle school. She has a long, straight purple hair. She is good at cooking and sewing, but her naming sense is bad. She is good friends with Ara (Voiced by: Ayumi Mano), Eimi (Voiced by: Nako Eguchi), and Mii (Voiced by: Arisa Date).
Tomoko Saeki (佐伯智花, Saeki Tomoko)
Yuka's mother. She is strict with her daughter's grades due to Yuka failing her middle school entrance exam at one time.
Yamato Suou (周防 大和, Suō Yamato)
Voiced by: Shun Horie
Yuka's male classmate who is good at claw crane games. He is one of the first human after Yuka who knows the existence of underground-dwellers. He has confessed to Yuka once, but hasn't got the answer from her yet.
Akari Suou (周防あかり, Suou Akari)
Yamato's younger sister. After she met Chi-chan, she wants to play and become friends with him.
Kazuma Mori (森和馬, Mori Kazuma)
Yuka's childhood friend who is older than her. When he and Yuka was in elementary school, he used to play pranks on Yuka, which made her angry. He did this because he had a crush on Yuka, and wanted her attention.

=== Underground-dwellers ===
Chi-chan (ちぃちゃん, Chi-chan)
Voiced by: Rie Murakawa
The dweller protagonist. An underground-dweller that had stuck on the hole he came from when he wanted to return home. His body is about a size of a crane game prize, and he has a round, yellow body. At first, he was afraid of humans because he thought that if he gets caught, he would be dissected by them. But then, since his meeting with Yuka, his judgement of humans changed.
Since the names of underground-dwellers are usually unintelligible to humans, he gets the name "Chi-chan" from Yuka, from the term chiteijin (地底人), the Japanese word for underground-dweller. He has a verbal tic of -dechi (～でち) when ending his sentences.
Joe-kun (ジョーくん, Jo-kun)
Voiced by: Rika Nagae
Chi-chan's friend. He came to the human world searching for Chi-chan that went missing from the underground. He has a round, green-colored body. He gets the name "Joe" from Yuka due to his verbal tic, -dajo (～じょ).
Non-chan (のんちゃん)
An underground dweller who respects Chi-chan.
Chi-chan's father (ちぃちゃんパパ, Chi-chan papa)
Chi-chan's father who appeared in Episode 12. He wears a silk hat and has a mustache. He has a yellow body like his son.
Chi-chan's mother (ちぃちゃんママ, Chi-chan mama)
Chi-chan's mother who appeared in Episode 12. She wears an apron and a skirt. She has a yellow body like her son.

=== Aliens ===
Ucchan (うっちゃん)
Voiced by: Yuuko Kurose
An alien girl who was rescued by Yuka when her spaceship crash landed to Earth and Yuka was climbing at the time. The name "Ucchan" comes from Uchuujin (宇宙人), the Japanese word for alien. She can create various gadgets.

== Media ==
=== Manga ===
The original manga series is written and illustrated by Hiromu Shinozuka, and began serialization on March 3, 2015, in the April 2015 issue of Shogakukan's Ciao magazine. The first tankōbon was released by Shogakukan on November 27, 2015. On August 31, 2018, it was announced that PriPri Chi-chan!! would end after the seventh volume in Spring 2019.

=== Anime ===
The anime adaptation is produced by OLM, Inc., directed by Takahiro Ikezoe, and written by Michihiro Tsuchiya. The series premiered on April 15, 2017, on the MBS and TBS' new Saturday morning time slot, "Anime Saturday 630" (pronounced "Anime Saturday Roku San Maru").

From episodes 1 to 12, the opening theme song is "Tokubetsu Ichiban!!" (トクベツいちばん!!, lit. Special Number One) by Momo Asakura, and the ending theme song used in episodes 1 to 12 is "Honey to Lupus" (ハニーアンドループス, lit. Honey and Lupus) by Aki Toyosaki. By episodes 13 to 25, the opening theme song is "Twins" by CHiCO with HoneyWorks and the ending theme song used since episodes 13 to 25 is "Fuwari, korori, karan, koron" (フワリ、コロリ、カラン、コロン) by Shiina Natsukawa. The opening theme used from episode 26 to 36 is "Colorful" (カラフル) by Momo Asakura, and the ending theme song used from episode 26 to 36 is "Uchouten Traveler" (有頂天トラベラー, lit. Ecstatic Traveler) by Haruka Tomatsu. The anime is streamed outside of Asia by Crunchyroll.

== Reception ==
PriPri Chi-chan!! won the 63rd Shogakukan Manga Award in the Kodomo category in 2018.
