= Idoly Pride =

Japanese multimedia franchise

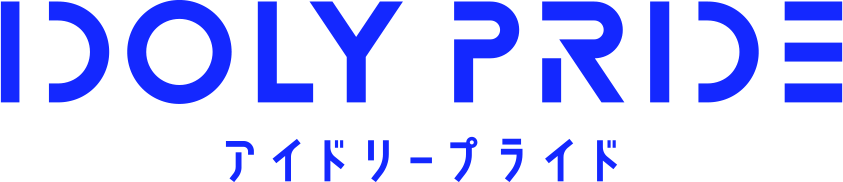
- Genre: Tragedy
- Created by: Yoshiki Minazumi; Kaoru Adachi; Jukki Hanada
- Manga

Idoly Pride: Stage of Asterism
- Written by: Hiroki Haruse
- Published by: Kadokawa Shoten
- Magazine: Comic Newtype
- Original run: June 10, 2020 – November 30, 2021
- Volumes: 3
- Manga

Idoly Pride: Beginning of Lodestar
- Written by: Yuriko Asami
- Published by: Kadokawa Shoten
- Magazine: ComicWalker; Niconico Seiga
- Original run: October 30, 2020 – June 24, 2021
- Volumes: 2
- Anime television series
- Directed by: Yū Kinome
- Written by: Tatsuya Takahashi; Yasuhiro Nakanishi
- Music by: Yuki Kishida; Kazuya Saka; Takayuki Tonegawa; Yuki Nara
- Studio: Lerche (animation); CAAnimation (production)
- Licensed by: Crunchyroll
- Original network: Tokyo MX; BS NTV; Animax; KBS
- Original run: January 10, 2021 – March 28, 2021
- Episodes: 12
- Video game
- Developer: QualiArts, Inc.
- Publisher: QualiArts, Inc. (Japan); Neowiz (Global)
- Genre: Rhythm, role-playing
- Platform: iOS, Android
- Released: June 24, 2021

Idoly Pride (stylized in all-caps) is a Japanese idol-themed multimedia project created by CyberAgent subsidiary QualiArts and CyberNext (a joint venture with Nexon), Straight Edge, and Sony Music Entertainment Japan subsidiary MusicRay'n, with character designs by QP:flapper. The series has been adapted into two manga series. An anime television series by CAAnimation and Lerche aired from January to March 2021.

== Plot ==
A small entertainment company, Hoshimi Production, based in Hoshimi City, produced one of the rising stars of the idol industry: Mana Nagase. One day, she died in a traffic accident on her way to the Venus Grand Prix finals, devastating the people around her, but also inspiring some of them to become eternal idols.

A few years later, Hoshimi Production holds an audition to find a new idol. Kotono Nagase, the younger sister of Mana, appears on stage along with Sakura Kawasaki, a girl with a voice just like Mana's. Starting with just Kotono and Sakura, and later totaling to a group of ten girls which are divided into two groups: Moon Tempest and Sunny Peace, they all gather and start living together in a dormitory.

The series also features Trinity Aile wanting to surpass Mana, apart from LizNoir that harbors an extraordinary rivalry with her. Standing up to each other and competing with the pride in their hearts, they aim for their best as the emotions surrounding Mana and the rivalry become entangled.

== Characters ==
=== Hoshimi Production ===
Hoshimi Production (星見プロダクション, Hoshimi Purodakushon) is a small talent agency focused on idols, located in the suburbs of Kanto, headed by Shinji Saegusa.

Mana Nagase (長瀬 麻奈, Nagase Mana)
Voiced by: Sayaka Kanda
Mana was a high school student who instantly became popular the moment she debuted as a solo idol. She personally asked her high school classmate, Kōhei Makino, to be her manager at Hoshimi Production because he sat next to her. She was to appear in the Venus Grand Prix finals, only to be killed in a traffic accident while on her way there. She later appears in front of Kōhei as a ghost. It is implied that she had feelings for Kōhei, which are confirmed in the last episode as she kisses him before returning to the afterlife.
Kōhei Makino (牧野 航平, Makino Kōhei)
Voiced by: Haruki Ishiya
Kōhei is Mana's classmate at high school and later manager at Hoshimi Production. A kind of person who cannot refuse when asked, he is looking after the girls at Hoshimi Production, along with Mana's spirit, whom he can see. Kōhei also serves as the protagonist in the game version, albeit as a self-insert character, and is simply referred as "Manager". It is implied that he had feelings for Mana.
Shinji Saegusa (三枝 信司, Saegusa Shinji)
Voiced by: Rikiya Koyama
Shinji is Hoshimi Production's President. He used to work for a Van Production, a bigger entertainment company, but decided to quit as he desires to have his own company. He was the one who first scouted Mana, and later employed Kōhei as her manager at her request.

==== Idols ====
The ten girls associated with Hoshimi Production are later divided into two groups: Moon Tempest (月のテンペスト, Tsuki Tenpesuto) and Sunny Peace. Together, they are collectively referred to as Hoshimi Production.

Kotono Nagase (長瀬 琴乃, Nagase Kotono)
Voiced by: Mirai Tachibana
Kotono is Mana's younger sister who decided to become an idol to live her sister's dream. A stoic and serious person, she serves as leader of the group Moon Tempest. Kotono was initially against the idea of Mana becoming an idol, as the two had much less time together once Mana started her career. Kotono is a sophomore at Hoshimi Private High School.
Sakura Kawasaki (川咲 さくら, Kawasaki Sakura)
Voiced by: Mai Kanno
Sakura is a bright sophomore at Mitsugasaki Public High School, who decided to participate in an audition by Hoshimi Production because her heart guides her. Serving as leader of the group Sunny Peace, Sakura's singing voice is said to be similar to Mana's, even surprising Mana herself. It is revealed that Sakura had a heart condition, and that Mana had donated her heart to her. Later in the series, Sakura decides to sing with her own voice, which eventually leads Mana to pass on.
Rei Ichinose (一ノ瀬 怜, Ichinose Rei)
Voiced by: Moeko Yūki
Rei is a third-year student at Reiba Girls' Private High School who is good at dancing, even winning a place in a Japanese dance championship. Raised in a strict family, her parents do not want her to be a dancer. She is a member of Sunny Peace.
Nagisa Ibuki (伊吹 渚, Ibuki Nagisa)
Voiced by: Kokona Natsume
Nagisa is a sophomore at Hoshimi Private High School, Kotono's classmate, and member of Moon Tempest. She decided to become an idol because "Kotono seems to have fun talking about it".
Haruko Saeki (佐伯 遙子, Saeki Haruko)
Voiced by: Nao Sasaki
The oldest of the group at 20 years old, Haruko already had a solo idol career even before Mana. She graduated from Hoshimi Private High School and is currently attending Seiyō Gakuen Private University. She is a member of Sunny Peace. She initially lied about her age to the other members of Hoshimi Production because she was conscious of being older than the others.
Saki Shiraishi (白石 沙季, Shiraishi Saki)
Voiced by: Koharu Miyazawa
Saki is a third-year student at Mitsugasaki Public High School and its student council president; at school, she is considered an honor student. She always admires idols and decided to become one herself. She is the older sister of Chisa Shiraishi. She is a member of Moon Tempest.
Chisa Shiraishi (白石 千紗, Shiraishi Chisa)
Voiced by: Kanon Takao
The younger sister of Saki Shiraishi, Chisa is a freshman at Mitsugasaki Public High School. She became an idol because she wants to be together with her sister. However, upon being separated from Saki and becoming a member of Sunny Peace, Chisa begins learning to stop relying too much on her sister.
Suzu Narumiya (成宮 すず, Narumiya Suzu)
Voiced by: Kanata Aikawa
A third year student at Reiba Girls' Private Middle School who greatly admires Mana, referring to her as "Mana-sama". Suzu comes from a wealthy family, a fact she often brings up during her introductions, and came to Hoshimi Production to escape from a certain trouble. She is a member of Moon Tempest.
Mei Hayasaka (早坂 芽衣, Hayasaka Mei)
Voiced by: Moka Hinata
A freshman at Hoshimi Private High School and member of Moon Tempest. Mei is a girl who is personally scouted by Kōhei to change the tension between the members. She has an athletic personality and is the only person besides Kōhei who can see Mana.
Shizuku Hyōdō (兵藤 雫, Hyōdō Shizuku)
Voiced by: Yukina Shuto
An idol otaku and member of Sunny Peace, Shizuku is a freshman at Mitsugasaki Public High School. She is generally quiet and prefers to keep her mouth shut, but starts to talk much whenever there is a talk about idols.

=== Van Production ===
The entertainment company with a particular specialty in idols, and Saegusa's former employers.

Kyoichi Asakura (朝倉 恭一, Asakura Kyoichi)
Voiced by: Show Hayami (anime)
Asakura serves as president of Van Production. Despite being calm and emotionless, he always has the back of the idol groups he created. Asakura is Rui's biological father, but unaware of this.
Kiriko Himeno (姫野 霧子, Himeno Kiriko)
Voiced by: Rie Tanaka (anime)
Kiriko is LizNoir's manager in Van Production.

==== TrinityAile ====
The voice actresses of Trinity Aile are the members of group unit TrySail.

Rui Tendō (天動 瑠依, Tendō Rui)
Voiced by: Sora Amamiya
Rui is Trinity Aile's center.
Yū Suzumura (鈴村 優, Suzumura Yū)
Voiced by: Momo Asakura
Yū is a bright girl who speaks in a Kyoto dialect.
Sumire Okuyama (奥山 すみれ, Okuyama Sumire)
Voiced by: Shiina Natsukawa
Sumire is former child actress who turned into a singer.

==== LizNoir ====
The voice actresses of LizNoir are the members of group unit Sphere. In the anime, only Rio and Aoi appear as members of the group at first, while Ai and Kokoro join the group in the last episode.

Rio Kanzaki (神崎 莉央, Kanzaki Rio)
Voiced by: Haruka Tomatsu
Aoi Igawa (井川 葵, Igawa Aoi)
Voiced by: Ayahi Takagaki
Ai Komiyama (小美山 愛, Komiyama Ai)
Voiced by: Minako Kotobuki
Kokoro Akazaki (赤崎 こころ, Akazaki Kokoro)
Voiced by: Aki Toyosaki

=== IIIX ===
Fran (フラン)
Voiced by: Lynn
Kana (カナ)
Voiced by: Aimi Tanaka
Miho (ミホ)
Voiced by: Rie Murakawa
Kako (カコ)
Voiced by: Miyu Tomita

== Media ==
=== Manga ===
A manga series by Hiroki Haruse, titled Idoly Pride Stage of Asterism, was serialized on Kadokawa's Comic Newtype website from June 10, 2020, to November 30, 2021.

A second manga series by Yuriko Asami, titled Idoly Pride Beginning of Lodestar, was serialized through the ComicWalker and Niconico Seiga websites from October 30, 2020, to June 24, 2021. The series focuses on Mana Nagase and serves as a prequel to the main series.

==== Volume list ====
===== Idoly Pride Stage of Asterism =====
No.	Release date	ISBN
1	January 15, 2021	978-4-04-111036-2
2	April 2, 2021	978-4-04-111117-8
3	January 8, 2022	978-4-04-112109-2

===== Idoly Pride Beginning of Lodestar =====
No.	Release date	ISBN
1	January 27, 2021	978-4-04-913629-6
2	June 10, 2021	978-4-04-913693-7

=== Anime ===
An anime television series was first announced in December 2019. It is the first anime produced by CAAnimation, a label created by CyberAgent to produce original anime. Lerche is also credited for production. The series was directed by Yū Kinome and written by Tatsuya Takahashi, with character designs by Sumie Kinoshita. It aired from January 10 to March 28, 2021, on Tokyo MX and other channels. (Note: Episodes were released on AbemaTV every Sunday at 11:00 PM JST, 30 minutes before the original air time on Tokyo MX.) The opening theme song is "Idoly Pride" while the ending theme song is "The Sun, Moon and Stars", both performed by Hoshimi Production. Funimation licensed the series and streamed it on its website in North America, the United Kingdom, and the Republic of Ireland; mainland Europe through Wakanim; Australia and New Zealand through AnimeLab.

No.	Title (Note: All English titles are taken from Crunchyroll.)	Directed by (Note: Information is taken from the ending credits of each episode.)	Written by	Original release date
1	"From This First Step"; Transliteration: "Kono Ippo Kara" (Japanese: この一歩から)	Yū Kinome	Tatsuya Takahashi	January 10, 2021
2	"The Reason We Stand Here"; Transliteration: "Koko ni Tatsu Sono Riyū" (Japanese: ここに立つその理由)	Kōsaku Taniguchi	Tatsuya Takahashi	January 17, 2021
3	"Everyone's Looking for the Answer"; Transliteration: "Dare mo ga Kotae o Sagashiteru" (Japanese: 誰もが答えを探してる)	Yōhei Fukui	Yasuhiro Nakanishi	January 24, 2021
4	"Raise the Volume More and More"; Transliteration: "Motto Motto Boryūmu o Agete" (Japanese: もっともっとボリュームを上げて)	Shōta Hamada	Tatsuya Takahashi	January 31, 2021
5	"Separate Lights, One Feeling"; Transliteration: "Betsu no Hikari Onaji Kimochi" (Japanese: 別の光 同じ気持ち)	Yoshihito Nishōji	Yasuhiro Nakanishi	February 7, 2021
6	"For a Precious Stage"; Transliteration: "Kakegae no Nai Sutēji o" (Japanese: かけがえのないステージを)	Noriyuki Nomata	Yasuhiro Nakanishi	February 14, 2021
7	"Shining Smile"	Yūsuke Kamada	Tatsuya Takahashi	February 21, 2021
8	"You're Good Just the Way You Are"; Transliteration: "Kimi wa Kimi no Mama de Ii" (Japanese: 君は君のままでいい)	Yūki Nishihata	Yasuhiro Nakanishi	February 28, 2021
9	"Embrace the Courage You've Been Given"; Transliteration: "Moratta Yūki o Dakishimete" (Japanese: もらった勇気を抱きしめて)	Yōhei Fukui	Tatsuya Takahashi	March 7, 2021
10	"A Place That Cannot Be Reached Alone"; Transliteration: "Jibun Dake ja Tadoritsukenai Basho" (Japanese: 自分だけじゃ辿り着けない場所)	Kōsaku Taniguchi	Yasuhiro Nakanishi	March 14, 2021
11	"Burn the Sound of Life"; Transliteration: "Inochi no Oto Moyashite" (Japanese: 命の音燃やして)	Shōta Hamada	Tatsuya Takahashi	March 21, 2021
12	"The Story That Begins With Goodbye"; Transliteration: "Sayonara Kara Hajimaru Monogatari" (Japanese: サヨナラから始まる物語)	Yū Kinome	Tatsuya Takahashi	March 28, 2021

=== Game ===
A mobile game for Android and iOS developed by QualiArts was released on June 24, 2021. The game will end service and went offline on March 1, 2027.

A year after its initial Japanese release, an English version was later stealthily revealed to be published by Boltrend Games. It had a closed beta test on September 14, 2022, with the end date previously being September 21, before being extended for two days. After said beta, Boltrend Games would start pre-registrations with an official release date to be announced.

Following months of silence, Boltrend Games announced in February 2023 that they were no longer publishing the game. A global release by Neowiz was announced in March 2023. Pre-registrations began the following month. The game was released on June 1, 2023, and would follow the content schedule of the Korean version.

The service will end at March 1, 2027.

== Similarities ==
Idoly Pride is an example of the twin films phenomena alongside Selection Project. Reviewers have compared both anime to each other and have described the two as sharing certain storylines and similar characters. Both franchises were greenlit days apart in December 2019, and aired within months of each other.
