= Sora Amamiya =

Japanese voice actress and singer (born 1993)

- 雨宮 天
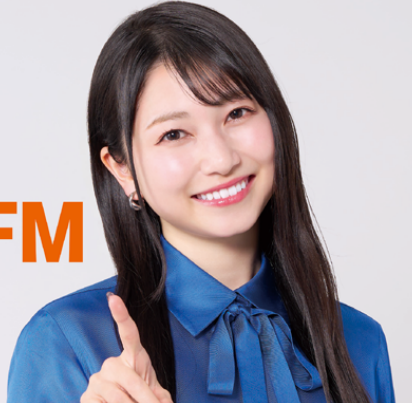
- Amamiya in 2025
- Born: August 28, 1993 (age 33); Tokyo, Japan
- Occupations: Voice actress; singer
- Years active: 2012–present
- Employer: Music Ray'n
- Musical career
- Genres: J-pop; anime song
- Instrument: Vocals
- Years active: 2014–present
- Label: Sony Music Entertainment Japan/Music Ray'n
- Member of: TrySail
- Website: amamiyasora.jp

Sora Amamiya (雨宮 天, Amamiya Sora; born August 28, 1993) is a Japanese voice actress and singer. After passing an audition held by Music Ray'n, she made her voice acting debut in 2012. She had a leading role for the anime series One Week Friends.

Some of her anime roles include Akame in Akame ga Kill!, Elizabeth Liones in The Seven Deadly Sins, Miko Yotsuya in Mieruko-chan, Aqua in KonoSuba, Touka Kirishima in Tokyo Ghoul, Asseylum Vers Allusia in Aldnoah.Zero, Chizuru Ichinose in Rent-A-Girlfriend, Isla in Plastic Memories, Mayuri in Date A Live: Mayuri Judgement, Sumire Yoshizawa in Persona 5 Royal, Hitomi Uzaki in Killing Bites, Ayame Himuro in Science Fell in Love, So I Tried to Prove It, and Nazuna Nanakusa in Call of the Night. She also performed theme songs for various anime she has acted in. She won the Best Rookie Actress Award at the 9th Seiyu Awards.

Amamiya is a member of the music unit TrySail, along with voice actresses Momo Asakura and Shiina Natsukawa. She is also active as a solo singer, having released four albums, three compilation albums, and two cover album as of 2025. Her music career has been influenced by various inspirations, including among others CD covers and foreign styles of music.

== Biography ==
=== Early life ===
Amamiya was born in Tokyo, Japan on August 28, 1993. She encountered a video collection of voice actress Miyuki Sawashiro's roles while a high-school sophomore. The event inspired her to become a voice actress.

=== Acting career ===
Amamiya, together with Momo Asakura and Shiina Natsukawa, passed an audition held by Music Ray'n in 2011, with the three making their voice acting debut in 2012. Her first lead role was Kaori Fujimiya in the 2014 anime television series One Week Friends. That same year, she played the role of Akame in Akame ga Kill!, Asseylum Vers Allusia in Aldnoah.Zero, Touka Kirishima in Tokyo Ghoul, and Elizabeth Liones in The Seven Deadly Sins.

In 2015, she was cast as Isla in Plastic Memories, Miia in Monster Musume, and Mayuri in the anime film Date A Live: Mayuri Judgement. Amamiya, together with Reina Ueda and Aya Suzaki, received the Best Rookie Actress Award at the 9th Seiyu Awards in March 2015. That same year, she played the role of Aqua in the anime KonoSuba.

In 2017, she played the role of Rui Kanoya in Re:Creators, and Haruka Narumi in Battle Girl High School. The following year, she was cast as Methode in Beatless, Hitomi Uzaki in Killing Bites, and Dancho Arthur in the mobile game Han-Gyaku-Sei Million Arthur; she would later reprise the role in the game's anime adaptation. She played the role of Akemi Sōryūin in the anime How Heavy Are the Dumbbells You Lift?, and reprised her role as Aqua in the anime film KonoSuba: God's Blessing on This Wonderful World! Legend of Crimson in 2019.

In 2020, she played Chizuru Mizuhara in the anime series Rent-A-Girlfriend. In 2021, she voiced Miko Yotsuya in the anime series Mieruko-chan. She voiced Nazuna Nanakusa in Call of the Night in 2022, Lily in Spy Classroom in 2023, and Asahi Shonan in Medaka Kuroiwa Is Impervious to My Charms and Kaede Satō in A Mangaka's Weirdly Wonderful Workplace in 2025.

=== Music career ===
Amamiya's music career began when she performed the song "Kanade" (奏（かなで）; lit. "Symphony"), a cover of a 2004 single by Sukima Switch. The song was used as the ending theme to One Week Friends. She made her official music debut for Music Ray'n by performing Akame ga Kill's opening theme song "Skyreach"; the song peaked at number 13 on the Oricon weekly charts.

In late 2014, Amamiya, Asakura, and Natsukawa formed the music unit TrySail, which released its first single "Youthful Dreamer", used as the opening theme song to the anime television series Ultimate Otaku Teacher, on May 13, 2015. In 2016, she, along with her co-stars, Rie Takahashi and Ai Kayano performed KonoSuba's ending theme song "Chīsana Bōken-sha" (ちいさな冒険者; lit."Little Adventurer"). She released her first solo album Various BLUE on September 7, 2016; the album peaked at number 7 on the Oricon weekly charts. Her second album The Only BLUE was released on July 11, 2018.

In 2020, she performed the song "Kimi o Tooshite" (君を通して), which was used as an insert song in the twelfth episode of Rent-A-Girlfriend. She released her third album Paint It, BLUE on September 2, 2020. In 2021, she performed the songs "Mienai Kara ne!?" (見えないからね!?; "I Can't See Them, Okay!?") and "Mita na? Mita yo ne?? Miteru yo ne???" (ミタナ？ミタヨネ？？ミテルヨネ？？？; "You Saw Me? You Saw Me, Right?? You're Seeing Me Right Now, Right???"), which are used as the opening and ending themes respectively to Mieruko-chan. She released a cover album titled Covers: Sora Amamiya Favorite Songs on October 21, 2021, and two compilation albums titled Red and Blue on January 5, 2022.

Amamiya released the EP "Dōkasen" (導火線) on March 22, 2023, with her composing and writing all the songs. She released a second cover album titled Covers II: Sora Amamiya Favorite Songs on June 21, 2023. She released the single "Shōten" (衝天) on January 31, 2024, and an album titled Ten to Bluer on March 27, 2024, to coincide with her 10th anniversary an artist. She released a Christmas single titled "Blue Christmas for You" on December 18, 2024. She released a third cover album titled Covers III: Sora Amamiya Favorite Songs on June 18, 2025.

Amamiya's song "Non Scenario Etude" was used as the opening theme to the fifth season of Rent-A-Girlfriend in 2026; she both composed and wrote the lyrics to the song.

== Musical style and influences ==
In an interview with the anime publication LisAni!, Amamiya described the production process of her single "Freesia", the title track of which was used as the ending theme to the Japanese airing of the animated television series Heaven Official's Blessing. She noted that, starting in 2017, she tended to release solo singles in odd-numbered years, and how "Freesia" fit that pattern as well. She noted that "Freesia" has an oriental atmosphere, with the first part having the image of a small room that opens up as a result of becoming rusty; the song's oriental atmosphere also influenced its music video. The appearance of the single's title on the cover, as well as the cover itself, were meant to be reminiscent of a retro 7-inch single, with her emphasizing this point by holding a vintage microphone. For the single's B-side "Jōnetsu no Te Amo", she aimed for the song to have a Latin flavor, with the song featuring a Spanish guitar among other influences. She noted that writing the song was a challenge as she did not play the guitar and she had to research various kinds of instruments. The single's third song "Emerald" was also noted to have an exotic introduction.

In an interview with Natalie, Amamiya detailed the creation of her EP "Dōkasen". She wanted to produce a work that channeled her love for J-Pop, along with following up her previous songs "Hibana" and "Viper", which were imagined as being written for recitals. She wanted to release a work were all the songs were written and composed by her, using the skills she learned while spending her free time during the pandemic. The lead track "Trigger" was inspired by her fondness for jazz music, and she wanted to include at least one jazz song in the EP. The song "Tokai Tōhikō (Neon Escape)" was written while imagining Akina Nakamori, one of her favorite singers, and was based on the idea of a woman from the country arriving in Tokyo and becoming tired of the city life. She wanted the song to sound like a typical Japanese pop song and include common words. The song "Hatsukōyō" was inspired by her love of enka, while the song "Maria ni Kanpai" was inspired by Linda Yamamoto and the Shōwa era; she had a particular fondness for "Maria ni Kanpai" despite not being the EP's lead track, so she decided to take the lyric "Dōkasen" from the song and use it as the EP's subtitle. The last song "Potsuri, Ai" focuses on a failed long-distance relationship and was partly based on the story of one of her staff members.

== Filmography ==
=== Anime ===
List of voice performances in anime
Year	Title	Role	Notes	Source
2012	From the New World	Misuzu	Ep. 2	
2012	My Little Monster	Female student E	Ep. 4	
2012	Aikatsu!	Konatsu Hayase, Wakaba Kuze, Yuna Nakayama		
2013	Yonhyaku-nijuu Renpai Girl	Miyako Dokuutsugi	Light novel special anime PV	
2013	Jewelpet Happiness	Female student	Ep. 1	
2013	A Certain Scientific Railgun S	Girl	Ep. 7, 17	
2013	Majestic Prince	Rona	Ep. 9, 12–13, 15, 18, 21, 23-25	
2013	Silver Spoon	Female student B		
2013	Hyperdimension Neptunia: The Animation	Nation B		
2013	Gaist Crusher	Midori Hisui		
2013	Log Horizon	Liliana		
2013	Wanna Be the Strongest in the World!	Aika Hayase		
2014	Nobunaga the Fool	Operator	Ep. 1	
2014	Blade & Soul	Jin Hazuki		
2014–2020	The Irregular at Magic High School	Honoka Mitsui		
2014	One Week Friends	Kaori Fujimiya		
2014	Love Live! School Idol Project 2nd Season	First year student A	Ep. 7	
2014–2018	Tokyo Ghoul	Touka Kirishima	Also √A and :re	
2014–2015	Aldnoah.Zero	Asseylum Vers Allusia	Also season 2	
2014	Akame ga Kill!	Akame		
2014–2021	The Seven Deadly Sins	Elizabeth Liones, Liz	Also seasons 2-4	
2014	Channel 5.5 - The Rose of Versailles parody remake	Marie Antoinette	ONA	
2014	Lord Marksman and Vanadis	Girl	Ep. 8, 10	
2014	Tenkuu Shinpan	Yuri Honjo	ONA	
2015	Plastic Memories	Isla		
2015	Ultimate Otaku Teacher	Minako Kanou		
2015	Punch Line	Mikatan Narugino		
2015	Ninja Slayer From Animation	Yamoto Koki	ONA	
2015	Classroom Crisis	Iris Shirasaki		
2015–2017	Monster Musume	Miia	Also OVA	
2016	Divine Gate	Yukari		
2016–present	KonoSuba	Aqua	Also season 2, 3 and OVAs	
2016–2021	Bungo Stray Dogs	Elise	Also season 2 and 3	
2016–2017	High School Fleet	Moeka China	Also OVA	
2016	Puzzle & Dragons X	Sonia		
2016	Qualidea Code	Aoi Yaegaki		
2016	Izetta: The Last Witch	Sophie		
2016	WWW.Working!!	Shiho Kamakura		
2017	Interviews with Monster Girls	Kurtz		
2017	Hand Shakers	Musubu Takatsuki		
2017–2019	Ani ni Tsukeru Kusuri wa Nai!	Shi Miao	Also season 2 and 3	
2017	Re:Creators	Rui Kanoya	Herself in Ep. 16–17, 21	
2017	Battle Girl High School	Haruka Narumi		
2017	Yume ga Sameru Made	Yuki	ONA	
2018–2019	Shinkansen Henkei Robo Shinkalion THE ANIMATION	Futaba Mihara		
2018	Overlord II	Crusch Lulu		
2018	Beatless	Methode		
2018	Killing Bites	Hitomi Uzaki		
2018	Baki	Kozue Matsumoto		
2018	Rascal Does Not Dream of Bunny Girl Senpai	Uzuki Hirokawa		
2018–2019	Million Arthur	Dancho Arthur	Also season 2	
2019–present	Isekai Quartet	Aqua	Also season 2 and 3	
2019	How Heavy Are the Dumbbells You Lift?	Akemi Sōryūin		
2019	Doraemon	Candy	Ep. 572a	
2019	Azur Lane	Illustrious		
2019	Kemono Michi: Rise Up	Ioana, Friend		
2020–2022	Magia Record: Puella Magi Madoka Magica Side Story	Yachiyo Nanami		
2020	Drifting Dragons	Takita		
2020–2022	Science Fell in Love, So I Tried to Prove It	Ayame Himuro		
2020	Pokémon: Twilight Wings	Rurina (Nessa)		
2020	Appare-Ranman!	Jin Xiaoleng		
2020–present	Rent-A-Girlfriend	Chizuru Mizuhara		
2020–2025	Our Last Crusade or the Rise of a New World	Aliceliese Lou Nebulis IX		
2020	Yuuna and the Haunted Hot Springs	Karura Hiōgi	OVA	
2021	Idoly Pride	Rui Tendō		
2021	The Hidden Dungeon Only I Can Enter	Elna Stongs		
2021	The Honor Student at Magic High School	Honoka Mitsui		
2021	Mieruko-chan	Miko Yotsuya		
2021–2024	Banished from the Hero's Party	Yarandrala		
2022	Akebi's Sailor Uniform	Erika Kizaki		
2022	Princess Connect! Re:Dive Season 2	Miyako / Miyako Izumo	Ep. 8, 10	
2022	Heroines Run the Show	Sena Narumi		
2022	Call of the Night	Nazuna Nanakusa		
2023	Kubo Won't Let Me Be Invisible	Saki Kubo		
2023	Spy Classroom	Lily		
2023	Mendako no Menmen	Menmen		
2023	Insomniacs After School	Haya Magari		
2023	Zom 100: Bucket List of the Dead	Saori Ohtori		
2023	The Vexations of a Shut-In Vampire Princess	Millicent Bluenight		
2023	The Idolmaster Million Live!	Shiho Kitazawa		
2023	Protocol: Rain	Yū Saegusa		
2024	Classroom of the Elite	Nazuna Asahina		
2024	Ishura	Curte the Clear Sky		
2024	The Banished Former Hero Lives as He Pleases	Noel		
2024	Sound! Euphonium 3	Kanade Hisaishi		
2024	Wistoria: Wand and Sword	Elnor Ljos Alf		
2025	Magic Maker: How to Make Magic in Another World	Rose		
2025	Medaka Kuroiwa Is Impervious to My Charms	Asahi Shonan		
2025	Possibly the Greatest Alchemist of All Time	Goddess Nolyn		
2025	#Compass 2.0: Combat Providence Analysis System	Jeanne		
2025	Bad Girl	Nana Matsuda		
2025	A Mangaka's Weirdly Wonderful Workplace	Kaede Satō		
2026	A Misanthrope Teaches a Class for Demi-Humans	Kyōka Minazuki		
2026	Sparks of Tomorrow	Inako Momokawa		
2026	From Overshadowed to Overpowered	Tatiana		
2026	Even Though I'm a Super Timid Noble Girl, I Accepted the Bet from My Cunning Fiancé	Erin White		
2026	Devils' Crest	Sumika Watamaki	ONA	
2027	A Pen, Handcuffs, and a Common-Law Marriage	Asuka Ishimuro		
2027	I Got a Cheat Skill in Another World and Became Unrivaled in the Real World, Too II	Mai Kagurazaka		
2027	The Moon on a Rainy Night	Kanon Oikawa		

=== Films ===
List of voice performances in feature films
Year	Title	Role	Notes	Source
2014	The Idolmaster Movie: Beyond the Brilliant Future!	Shiho Kitazawa		
2015	Love Live! The School Idol Movie	School idol		
2015	Date A Live: Mayuri Judgement	Mayuri		
2015	The Anthem of the Heart	Natsuki Nitō		
2016	Zutto Mae Kara Suki Deshita: Kokuhaku Jikkou Iinkai	Sena Narumi		
2016	Suki ni Naru Sono Shunkan o: Kokuhaku Jikkō Iinkai	Sena Narumi		
2017	Blame!	Zuru		
2017	The Irregular at Magic High School: The Movie – The Girl Who Summons the Stars	Honoka Mitsui		
2018	The Seven Deadly Sins the Movie: Prisoners of the Sky	Elizabeth Liones		
2019	Sound! Euphonium: The Movie – Our Promise: A Brand New Day	Kanade Hisaishi		
2019	Hakubo	Rina		
2019	KonoSuba: God's Blessing on This Wonderful World! Legend of Crimson	Aqua		
2019	Shinkansen Henkei Robo Shinkalion the Movie: The Marvelous Fast ALFA-X That Comes From the Future	Futaba Mihara		
2020	High School Fleet: The Movie	Moeka China		
2020	Kono Sekai no Tanoshimikata: Secret Story Film	Sena Narumi		
2021	The Seven Deadly Sins: Cursed by Light	Elizabeth Liones		
2022	Crayon Shin-chan: Mononoke Ninja Chinpūden	Fūko		
2022	The Seven Deadly Sins: Grudge of Edinburgh	Elizabeth Liones		
2023	Rascal Does Not Dream of a Sister Venturing Out	Uzuki Hirokawa		
2023	Sound! Euphonium: Ensemble Contest	Kanade Hisaishi		
2024	Ganbatte Ikimasshoi	Eiko Murakami		
2025	Make a Girl	Akane Kōmura		
2026	Rascal Does Not Dream of a Dear Friend	Uzuki Hirokawa		

=== Video games ===
List of voice performances in video games
Year	Title	Role	Notes	Source
2013	The Idolmaster Million Live!	Shiho Kitazawa	iOS, Android	
2013	Gaist Crusher	Hisui Midori	3DS	
2014	Freedom Wars	Shizuka "Fake" Laurent	PS Vita	
2014	The Irregular at Magic High School: LOST ZERO	Honoka Mitsui	PS Vita	
2014	The Irregular at Magic High School: Out of Order	Honoka Mitsui	iOS, Android	
2015	The Seven Deadly Sins: Knights in the Pocket	Elizabeth Liones	iOS, Android	
2015	The Seven Deadly Sins: Unjust Sin	Elizabeth Liones	3DS	
2015	Granblue Fantasy	Dorothy	iOS, Android	
2015	Princess Connect!	Miyako Izumo	iOS, Android	
2015	Twilight Lore	Abbey	iOS, Android	
2015	Battle Girl High School	Haruka Narumi	iOS, Android	
2015	Valiant Knights	Ciel Luminous	iOS, Android	
2015	Dragon's Dogma Online	Cecily	PS3, PS4, PC	
2015	Tokyo Ghoul: Jail	Touka Kirishima	PS Vita	
2015	MeiQ: Labyrinth of Death	Flea	PS Vita	
2016	Alice Order	Manatsu Rindou	iOS, Android	
2016	Girls' Frontline	Astra, Bren, Type 56-1	iOS, Android	
2016	Digimon World: Next Order	Luche	PS Vita, PS4	
2016	Etrian Odyssey V: Beyond the Myth	Solor	3DS	
2016	Plastic Memories	Isla	PS Vita	
2016	World of Final Fantasy	Reynn	PS4, PS Vita	
2017	The Idolmaster: Million Live! Theater Days	Shiho Kitazawa	iOS, Android	
2017	Magia Record: Puella Magi Madoka Magica Side Story	Yachiyo Nanami	iOS, Android	
2017	Kono Subarashii Sekai ni Shukufuku wo! -Kono Yokubukai Game ni Shinpan o!-	Aqua	PS4, PS Vita	
2017	Azur Lane	Illustrious, Le Triomphant	iOS, Android	
2018	Shin Megami Tensei: Liberation Dx2	Rika Ryuzouji	iOS, Android	
2018	The Seven Deadly Sins: Knights of Britannia	Elizabeth Liones	PS4	
2018	Princess Connect! Re:Dive	Miyako Izumo	iOS, Android	
2018	Han-Gyaku-Sei Million Arthur	Dancho Arthur	iOS, Android	
2018	Sdorica	Angelia Carlos, Angelia SP, Angelia MZ	iOS, Android	
2018	Fate/Grand Order	Valkyrie Thrúd	iOS, Android	
2018	Dragalia Lost	Louise	iOS, Android	
2018	Fire Emblem Heroes	Eir	iOS, Android	
2019	Dragon Quest XI S: Echoes of an Elusive Age	Serena, Puff-Puff Girl	Nintendo Switch, PS4, PC, Xbox One, Google Stadia	
2019	Star Ocean: Anamnesis	Kasumi Yoshizawa	iOS, Android	
2019	Persona 5 Royal	Sumire Yoshizawa, Cendrillon	PS4	
2020	KonoSuba: God’s Blessing on this Wonderful World! Fantastic Days	Aqua	iOS, Android	
2021	Idoly Pride	Rui Tendō	iOS, Android	
2021	Re:Zero − Starting Life in Another World: The Prophecy of the Throne	Melty Pristis	PS4, Nintendo Switch, PC	
2021	The King of Fighters All Star	Elizabeth Liones	iOS, Android	
2021	Rune Factory 5	Alice	Nintendo Switch	
2021	Alchemy Stars	Bethlehem, Wendy	iOS, Android	
2021	Pokémon Masters EX	Nessa, Mallow	iOS, Android	
2021	Counter:Side	Aoi Shizuka (Seo Yoon)	iOS, Android, PC	
2022	Tower of Fantasy	Saki Fuwa	iOS, Android, PC, PS4, PS5	
2022	Goddess of Victory: Nikke	Maxwell, Crow	iOS, Android	
2023	Persona 5 Tactica	Kasumi Yoshizawa	PS4, PS5, Nintendo Switch, Xbox One, Xbox Series X/S, PC	
2026	Arknights: Endfield	Yvonne	iOS, Android, PS5, PC	
2026	Trickcal: Chibi Go	Joanne	iOS, Android	
2026	Neverness to Everness	Elyms	iOS, Android, PS5, PC	
TBA	Panic in Sweets Land	Mint	PC	

=== Live-action ===
List of acting performances in live-action
Year	Title	Role	Notes	Source
2017	One Week Friends	School intercom	Voice role	
2018	Kamen Rider Build	Vernage/CD Lost Smash	Ep. 25, 29–30, 36–37, 43, 49	
2022	Rent-A-Girlfriend	Game character	Voice role	
2023	Stand Up Start	M		

=== Dubbing ===
List of voice dub performances in overseas productions
Title	Role	Voice dub for	Notes	Source
Absentia	Flynn Durand	Patrick McAuley	TV series	
All Saints Street	Jiuyue	Yang Ning	TV series	
Assassin's Creed Origins	Cleopatra	Zora Bishop	Video game	
Big Fish & Begonia	Chun	Ji Guanlin	Animation	
Helix	Mademoiselle Durant	Alexandra Sicard	TV series	
Meg 2: The Trench	Meiying Zhang	Sophia Cai	Film	
School of Rock	Summer	Jade Pettyjohn	TV series	
Ticket to Paradise	Lily Cotton	Kaitlyn Dever	Film	
Uncharted	Chloe Frazer	Sophia Ali	Film	

== Discography ==
=== Albums ===
List of albums, with selected chart positions
Title	Album details	Catalogue No.		Oricon	
Title	Album details	Regular edition	Limited edition	Peak position	Weeks charted
Various Blue	Released: September 7, 2016; Label: Music Ray'n; Format: CD, CD + DVD, CD + Blu-ray, digital download	SMCL-440	SMCL-438/9 (CD+DVD); SMCL-436/7 (CD+Blu-ray)	7	5
The Only Blue	Released: July 11, 2018; Label: Music Ray'n; Format: CD, CD + Blu-ray, digital download	SMCL-548	SMCL-546/7	6	5
Paint it, Blue	Released: September 2, 2020; Label: Music Ray'n; Format: CD, CD + DVD, CD + Blu-ray, digital download	SMCL-675	SMCL-670/2 (CD+DVD); SMCL-673/4 (CD+Blu-ray)	7	4
Ten to Bluer	Released: March 27, 2024; Label: Music Ray'n; Format: CD, CD + DVD, CD + Blu-ray, digital download	SMCL-885	SMCL-880/2 (CD+DVD); SMCL-883/4 (CD+Blu-ray)	10	3

==== Cover albums ====
List of cover albums, with selected chart positions
Title	Album details	Catalogue No.		Oricon	
Title	Album details	Regular edition	Limited edition	Peak position	Weeks charted
Covers - Sora Amamiya favorite songs -	Released: October 6, 2021; Label: Music Ray'n	SMCL-734		8	5
Covers II - Sora Amamiya favorite songs -	Released: June 21, 2023; Label: Music Ray'n	SMCL-822		14	2
Covers III - Sora Amamiya favorite songs -	Released: June 18, 2025; Label: Music Ray'n	SMCL-961		17	1

=== Singles ===
List of singles, with selected chart positions
Release date	Title	Catalogue No. (Regular edition)	Oricon		Album	Notes
Release date	Title	Catalogue No. (Regular edition)	Peak position	Weeks charted	Album	Notes
August 13, 2014	"Skyreach"	SMCL-348	13	9	Various BLUE	1st opening theme song for Akame ga Kill!
November 19, 2014	"Tsukiakari" (月灯り)	SMCL-361	25	4	Various BLUE	2nd ending theme song for Akame ga Kill!
September 9, 2015	"Velvet Rays"	SMCL-388	20	4	Various BLUE	Theme song for Valiant Knights
July 26, 2017	"irodori"	SMCL-494	8	3	The Only BLUE	—N/a
December 13, 2017	"Eternal"	SMCL-523	15	3	The Only BLUE	—N/a
May 9, 2018	"Chikai" (誓い)	SMCL-541	10	5	The Only BLUE	2nd ending theme song for The Seven Deadly Sins: Revival of The Commandments
January 16, 2019	"Defiance"	SMCL-579	9	4	Paint it, BLUE	—N/a
July 10, 2019	"Viper"	SMCL-606	11	1	Paint it, BLUE	—N/a
November 6, 2019	"Regeneration"	SMCL-625	13	1	Paint it, BLUE	Ending theme song for The Seven Deadly Sins: Wrath of the Gods
January 15, 2020	"Paradox"	SMCL-642	7	1	Paint it, BLUE	Opening theme song for Science Fell in Love, So I Tried to Prove It
May 12, 2021	"Eien no Aria" (永遠のAria)	SMCL-702	11	5	TBA	2nd opening theme song for The Seven Deadly Sins: Dragon's Judgement
July 21, 2021	"Freesia" (フリイジア)	SMCL-719	11	4	TBA	Ending theme song for Heaven Official's Blessing
May 11, 2022	"Love-Evidence"	SMCL-763	13	5	Ten to Bluer	Opening theme song for Science Fell in Love, So I Tried to Prove It
January 31, 2024	"Shoten" (衝天)	SMCL-859	11	3	Ten to Bluer	—N/a
