= Shiina Natsukawa =

Japanese voice actress (born 1996)

- 夏川 椎菜
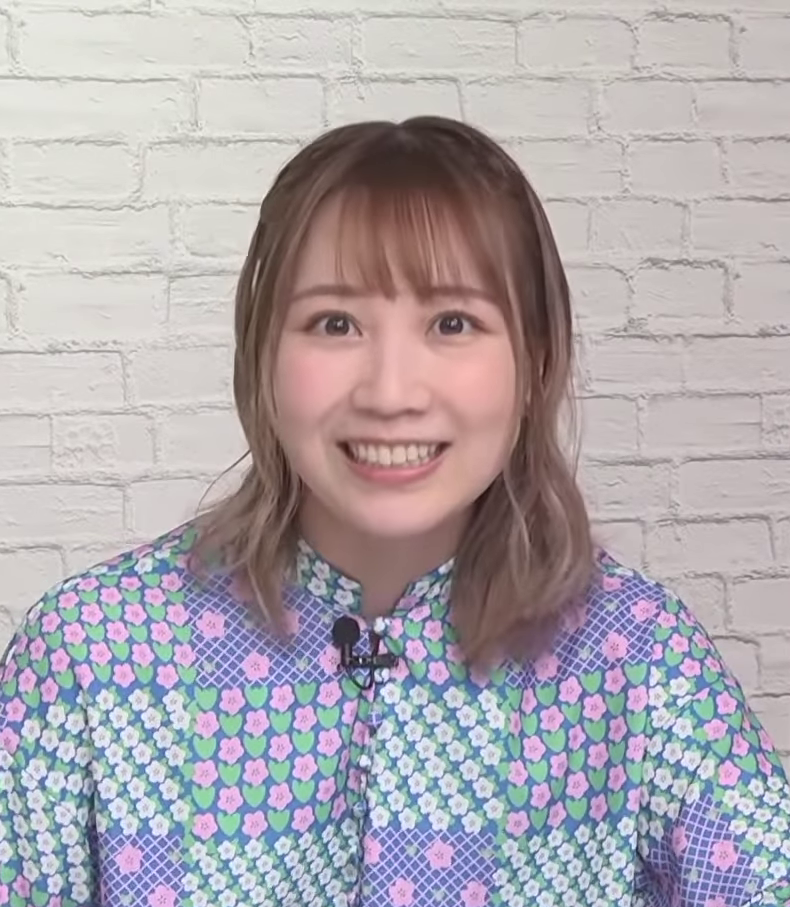
- Shiina Natsukawa in 2022
- Born: July 18, 1996 (age 30); Chiba Prefecture, Japan
- Occupations: Voice actress; singer; YouTuber
- Years active: 2012–present
- Employer: Music Ray'n
- Height: 158 cm (5 ft 2 in)
- Musical career
- Genres: J-pop; Anison
- Instrument: Vocals
- Years active: 2015–present
- Label: Sony Music Entertainment Japan/Music Ray'n
- Member of: TrySail
- Website: www.natsukawashiina.jp

Shiina Natsukawa (夏川 椎菜, Natsukawa Shiina; born July 18, 1996) is a Japanese voice actress, singer and YouTuber from Chiba Prefecture. She is a member of the singing unit TrySail, along with Sora Amamiya and Momo Asakura. She is affiliated with Music Ray'n. Her notable roles include Akeno Misaki in High School Fleet, Yuki Kusakabe in Interviews with Monster Girls, Hikayu Hoshikawa in Re:Creators, and Tsuruno Yui in Magia Record. Under her activities as a YouTuber she goes by the name 417P.

== Filmography ==
=== Anime ===
List of voice performances in anime
Year	Title	Role	Notes	Source
2012	My Little Monster	Female Student D		
2012–2016	Aikatsu!	Aya Hirasaka, Michiru Kurosawa, Nana Yuzuki, Kiriko Sōma		
2013	Jewelpet Happiness	Student	Ep. 8	
2013	A Certain Scientific Railgun S	Little Girl A		
2013	Silver Spoon	Female Student A		
2014	Witchcraft Works	Kanna Utsugi		
2014	One Week Friends	Yamazato		
2014	Locodol	Azuki Teragasaki		
2014	PriPara	Miruku		
2014	Bladedance of Elementalers	Meinasu		
2014	Celestial Method	Nonoka Komiya		
2014	Your Lie in April	Girl (Nuigurumi's Child)		
2015	Aldnoah.Zero	Lemrina Vers Envers	Season 2	
2015	Ultimate Otaku Teacher	Moemi Kushinada, Girls High School Student, Yui		
2015	Classroom Crisis	Aki Kaminagaya		
2015	Working!!!	Mizuki's Colleague		
2016	Dimension W	Ichigo Yurizaki		
2016–2017	High School Fleet	Akeno Misaki	Also OVA	
2016	Bungo Stray Dogs	Gin	Season 2	
2017	Interviews with Monster Girls	Yuki Kusakabe		
2017	Re:Creators	Hikayu Hoshikawa		
2019	Endro!	Ellenoar "Seira" Seiran		
2019	Stars Align	Namie Ameno		
2020–2022	Magia Record: Puella Magi Madoka Magica Side Story	Tsuruno Yui		
2021	Idoly Pride	Sumire Okuyama		
2022	Heroines Run the Show	Mona Narumi		
2024	Sound! Euphonium 3	Suzume Kamaya		

=== Films ===
List of voice performances in films
Year	Title	Role	Notes	Source
2014	The Idolmaster Movie: Beyond the Brilliant Future!	Anna Mochizuki		
2020	High School Fleet: The Movie	Akeno Misaki		
2020	Kono Sekai no Tanoshimikata: Secret Story Film	Mona Narumi		

=== Video games ===
List of voice performances in video games
Year	Title	Role	Notes	Source
2013	The Idolmaster Million Live!	Anna Mochizuki	iOS, Android	
2014	Freedom Wars	Marie "Alma" Milan	PS Vita	
2015	School Fanfare	Karin Hoshimoto	iOS, Android	
2017	Magia Record: Puella Magi Madoka Magica Side Story	Tsuruno Yui	iOS, Android	
2021	Idoly Pride	Sumire Okuyama	iOS, Android	
2021	Pokémon Masters EX	Lisia	iOS, Android	
2022	Anonymous;Code	Momo Aizaki	PS4, Switch	
2023	Panic in Sweets Land	Lime	PC	
2025	Puella Magi Madoka Magica: Magia Exedra	Tsuruno Yui	iOS, Android, PC	

== Discography ==
=== Albums ===
List of albums, with selected chart positions
Title	Album details	Catalogue No.		Oricon	
Title	Album details	Regular edition	Limited edition	Peak position	Weeks charted
Logline	Released: April 17, 2019; Label: Music Ray'n; Format: CD, CD + DVD, CD + Blu-ray, digital download	SMCL-598	SMCL-596/7 (CD+DVD); 594/5 (CD+Blu-ray)	8	4
Composite	Released: February 9, 2022; Label: Music Ray'n; Format: CD, CD + Blu-ray, digital download	SMCL-752	SMCL-747/9; SMCL-750/1 (CD+Blu-ray)	9	2
Cable Salad	Released: November 15, 2023; Label: Music Ray'n; Format: CD, CD + Blu-ray, digital download	SMCL-840	SMCL-838/9; SMCL-835/7 (CD+Blu-ray)	20	2
Ep04	Released: April 16, 2025; Label: Music Ray'n; Format: CD, CD + Blu-ray, digital download	SMCL-959	SMCL-957/8	17	1
Crack and Flap	Released: February 4, 2026; Label: Music Ray'n; Format: CD, digital download	SMCL-979		19	1

=== Singles ===
List of singles, with selected chart positions
Release date	Title	Oricon		Album	Notes
Release date	Title	Peak position	Weeks charted	Album	Notes
April 5, 2017	"Grapefruits Moon" (グレープフルーツムーン)	7	3	Logline	—N/a
August 30, 2017	"Furari, Korori, Karan, Koron" (フワリ、コロリ、カラン、コロン)	14	3	Logline	Ending theme for the anime PriPri Chi-chan!!
July 18, 2018	"Parade" (パレイド)	10	3	Logline	—N/a
September 9, 2020	"Antithesis" (アンチテーゼ)	6	4	Composite	—N/a
January 6, 2021	"Cracked Little Pride"	6	4	Composite	—N/a
November 9, 2022	"Sasakure" (ササクレ)	16	3	Cable Salad	—N/a
May 17, 2023	"Yueni" (ユエニ)	15	3	Cable Salad	—N/a
April 17, 2024	"Shadow Boxer"	10	2	Crack and Flap	—N/a
October 30, 2024	"Later"	29	2	Crack and Flap	—N/a
