= Ultimate Otaku Teacher =

Japanese manga series

- First tankōbon volume cover, featuring siblings Junichiro (left) and Suzune Kagami (right)

電波教師 (Denpa Kyōshi)
- Genre: Comedy; Slice of life
- Manga
- Written by: Takeshi Azuma
- Published by: Shogakukan
- Imprint: Shōnen Sunday Comics
- Magazine: Weekly Shōnen Sunday
- Original run: November 2, 2011 – March 29, 2017
- Volumes: 26
- Anime television series
- Directed by: Masato Sato
- Written by: Atsushi Maekawa
- Music by: Ryuuichi Takada (Monaca)
- Studio: A-1 Pictures
- Licensed by: AUS: Madman Entertainment; NA: Funimation
- Original network: NNS (ytv, Nippon TV)
- Original run: April 4, 2015 – September 26, 2015
- Episodes: 24
- icon

Ultimate Otaku Teacher (Japanese: 電波教師, Hepburn: Denpa Kyōshi; 'Electromagnetic-wave Teacher' (Note: "Electromagnetic-wave" (電波, denpa), is used in Japanese to refer to a person who acts bizarrely, such as extreme otaku, or holds odd views, similar to the English term "tin foil hat".)), subtitled He Is an Ultimate Teacher, is a Japanese manga series, written and illustrated by Takeshi Azuma. It was serialized in Shogakukan's Weekly Shōnen Sunday magazine from November 2011 to March 2017, with its chapters collected in 26 tankōbon volumes.

A-1 Pictures produced two short anime clips, serving as promotion for the manga, and a 24-episode anime television series adaptation, which was broadcast on Yomiuri TV from April to September 2015. In North America, the series has been licensed by Funimation.

== Plot ==
The story follows Junichiro Kagami, whose sister Suzune is angry at him because of his complete disinterest in the real world. As Junichiro is interested in nothing but anime, manga and games, Suzune forces him to go on a job as a physics teacher substitute at the same high school from which he graduated. Junichiro proves himself a capable and hardworking teacher who comes with unorthodox methods based on the seemingly useless knowledge he obtained as an otaku to teach and motivate his students.

== Characters ==
=== Main characters ===
Junichiro Kagami (鑑 純一郎, Kagami Junichiro)
Voiced by: Daisuke Ono (Drama CD), Hiroshi Kamiya (anime) (Japanese); Anthony Bowling (English)
Junichiro is a 24-year-old otaku who dedicates his time to maintaining an anime blog until his sister compels him to teach at his former high school. A physics graduate, he gained notoriety at 17 after publishing a controversial paper theorizing a teleportation device similar to Doraemon's "Anywhere Door". Though dismissed by the scientific community, the theory remains unrefuted, despite the technological limitations preventing its realization. Despite recruitment offers from leading research institutions, Junichiro refuses, citing "YD", a self-diagnosed condition that restricts him to activities he desires. After beginning his teaching career, he is persuaded by Koyomi Hiiragi to remain at her school. Balancing his eccentric teaching style—often incorporating competitive video games—with his hobbies, he frequently assigns nicknames to those he encounters.
Suzune Kagami (鑑 純音, Kagami Suzune)
Voiced by: Kana Asumi (Drama CD), Rena Matsui (anime) (Japanese); Mikaela Krantz (English)
Suzune is Junichiro's younger sister, known for her short temper and strict control over the household finances, prohibiting her brother from making purchases without her consent. Though frequently frustrated by his behavior, she deeply cares for him and intends to support him indefinitely. Her hobby is batting practice, and she often strikes Junichiro with her bat when angered. Due to her aggressive demeanor, she remains the only person he genuinely fears.

=== Higashi Shinmei High School ===
Minako Kanō (叶美奈子, Kanō Minako)
Voiced by: Sora Amamiya (anime) (Japanese); Sarah Wiedenheft (English)
Once the leader of the Black Oracle gang, she despised the world for its lack of heroes until Junichiro inspired her with the words, "If there are no heroes, become one yourself". Motivated by this, she abandons her delinquent past and pursues a career as a voice actress. Junichiro dubs her "Face-Punch" (顔面パンチ, Ganmen-panchi), a playful reference to her fiery personality.
Miho Kitō (鬼頭 ミホ, Kitō Miho)
Voiced by: Yuiko Tatsumi (Japanese); Jamie Marchi (English)
A former member of the Black Oracle gang, she initially bullies Kanō in an attempt to drag her back into delinquency. After Junichirou intervenes with an unconventional "bullying lesson", she has a change of heart, befriends Kanō, and aspires to become a renowned chef. Junichiro nicknames her "Wicked Blondie" in reference to her rebellious past and distinctive appearance.
Yukino Kuribayashi (栗林 雪乃, Kuribayashi Yukino)
Voiced by: Yumi Uchiyama (Japanese); Kristin Sutton (English)
The class representative of Minako's class is a diligent honors student who initially disapproves of Junichiro's unorthodox approach. Her perception shifts after observing his genuine dedication to students. However, she inadvertently causes his dismissal when a photograph of their heated confrontation, capturing her emotional outburst, is used as evidence against him.

=== Hiiragi Academy ===
==== Icho Branch ====
Koyomi Hīragi (柊 暦, Hīragi Koyomi)
Voiced by: Suzuko Mimori (anime) (Japanese); Jad Saxton (English)
Koyomi is the eccentric chairman of Hiiragi Academy who finds Japan disappointingly dull and seeks to make it more entertaining. Intrigued by Junichiro's unorthodox teaching approach, she recruits him and enthusiastically backs his unconventional ideas whenever they align with her desire for amusement. Junichiro refers to her as "Options" (オプション付き, Opushon-tsuki), reflecting her unpredictable nature.
Makina Momozono (桃園 マキナ, Momozono Makina)
Voiced by: Yoko Hikasa (Drama CD), Saori Ōnishi (anime) (Japanese); Caitlin Glass (English)
As student council president and kendo club captain, Makina holds authority to expel underperforming teachers. Though frequently unwilling, she is often roped into Junichiro's schemes. He nicknames her "Irregular Twintails" (変則ツインテール, Hensoku Tsuintēru). She single-handedly raises her younger brother, Kazuya.
Seijūrō Nanami (七海 征十郎, Nanami Seijūrō)
Voiced by: Yoshimasa Hosoya (anime) (Japanese); Jarrod Greene (English)
A former baseball player who lost motivation after an injury, Nanami rediscovers passion through soccer under Junichiro's guidance. Once a member of Black Oracle, his imposing physique earns him the nickname "Cyborg Human" (改造人間, Kaizō Ningen). He often clashes with Makina.
Sachiko Tanaka (田中 さち子, Tanaka Sachiko)
Voiced by: Marina Inoue (Drama CD), Ayane Sakura (anime) (Japanese); Apphia Yu (English)
A truant student revealed to be Junichiro's favorite manga artist, publishing under the pen name "Kisaki Tenjōin" (天上院 騎咲, Tenjōin Kisaki). Junichiro addresses her as "Kisaki-sensei" upon discovering her identity.
Kōtarō Araki (荒木 光太郎, Araki Kōtarō)
Voiced by: Miyuki Sawashiro (Drama CD), Aki Toyosaki (anime) (Japanese); Tia Ballard (English)
Junichiro's online gaming ally, known in-game as "Luce" (ルーチェ, Rūche). A crossdressing student, he gains confidence through Junichiro's mentorship after a virtual duel where Junichiro sacrifices his account. Koyomi mandates he dress femininely at school due to his striking appearance.
Kiriko Shikishima (式島 切子, Shikishima Kiriko)
Voiced by: Azusa Tadokoro (anime) (Japanese); Dawn M. Bennett (English)
A maid café worker forced to resign until Junichiro negotiates an exception. Her habit of serving Junichiro fries inspires his nickname "Potatoes" (ポテト, Poteto).
Kanan Chinami (千波 花音, Chinami Kanan)
Voiced by: Rina Hidaka (anime) (Japanese); Monica Rial (English)
A shy girl who overcomes her voice insecurities with Junichiro's help. He calls her "Anime Voice" (アニメっ娘, Animekko).
Madoka Kuramochi (蔵持 円, Kuramochi Madoka)
Voiced by: M·A·O (Japanese); Alexis Tipton (English)
The student council treasurer facing a forced marriage. Junichiro nicknames her "Little Miss Money" (少しのミスお金, Sukoshi no misu okane).
Moemi Kushinada (櫛名田 萌美, Kushinada Moemi)
Voiced by: Shiina Natsukawa (Japanese); Leah Clark (English)
An idol singer defeated by Nagaru. Later revealed as an Icho student.
Sadamitsu Fuwa
An ambitious freshman nicknamed "Loser Flag" for his constant failures to stand out.

==== Main Branch ====
Alice Hiiragi (柊 アリス, Hiiragi Arisu)
The tyrannical chairman who runs the school like a prison. Junichiro reforms her system and nicknames her "Brioche Rolls".
Tomoya Tokisaka (時坂 朋也, Tokisaka Tomoya)
A U.S.-trained teacher and Junichiro's final opponent in the group war, defeating him with equal gaming prowess.
Reiko Mukyou (無響 零子, Mukyou Reiko)
Voiced by: Kana Hanazawa (Japanese); Lindsay Seidel (English)
A genius who replicates any skill after one observation. Unable to distinguish faces, she relies on scent and taste. Junichiro meets her during a one-day internship arranged by Koyomi.
Mimori Kichou
A manipulative reporter dubbed "Teacher Killer" for driving educators to resign. Junichiro counters her by live-streaming his life, dubbing her "Blogs Girl".
Nami Shirakawa
Alice's brainwashed enforcer, Nami softens after losing to Reiko in basketball. Junichiro nicknames her "Machine Girl".
Subaru Akatsuki
Afflicted by a love-dependent "illness", Subaru gains strength from unrequited feelings. Her synesthesia lets her perceive others' emotions. She fixates on Junichiro after his declaration to lead Hiragi Academy, earning the nickname "KS Girl".
Todoroki
Leader of Team Titan, he attempts to dominate White Princess in soccer but is thwarted by Junichiro's intervention. His shark-like teeth inspire the nickname "Football Brat".
Shou Narasawa
A White Princess member absorbed into Junichiro's group. He bonds with Junichiro during their E-rank dormitory stay, nicknamed "Decohead".
Kazuki Toono
Another White Princess recruit, notable for his glasses.
Uekusa
Leader of Team Noble Garden, she teaches farming to Junichiro's group. Her nickname, "Komatsu Girl", references her agricultural role.
Kuujou Daiki
A Blue Corps member who attempts to destroy Noble Garden's crops. Defeated by Junichiro in water polo, he revokes their expulsion.
Kaito Aizawa
Blue Corps' leader and self-proclaimed Junichiro fan. Anticipates their eventual clash, nicknamed "Self-Proclaimed Fan".

=== Other characters ===
Tim Bernards Lynn (ティム・バーナーズ・リン, Timu Bānāzu Rin)
Voiced by: Ayahi Takagaki (Japanese); Colleen Clinkenbeard (English)
Physicist trying to disprove Junichiro's theory.
Yamato Toune (刀祢 大和, Toune Yamato)
Voiced by: Aya Hirano (Japanese); Mallorie Rodak (English)
Junichiro's high school science mentor.
Hell Gates
Voiced by: Daisuke Namikawa (Japanese); Eric Vale (English)
Madoka's fiancé and gaming CEO.
Kazuya Momozono (桃園 一也, Momozono Kazuya)
Voiced by: Tomoko Tsuzuki (Japanese); Terri Doty (English)
Makina's younger brother.
Matome Nishikujou (西九条 まとめ, Nishikujou Matome)
Voiced by: Risa Taneda (Japanese); Kristi Kang (English)
A manga-loving ghost haunting a training camp. Junichiro helps her pass on by completing her unfinished story.
Nagare and Taki Komiya
Voiced by: Satsumi Matsuda (Japanese); Bryn Apprill (English) (Nagare)
Voiced by: Risae Matsuda (Japanese); Felecia Angelle (English) (Taki)
Taki leads Black Oracle Neo, while Nagare is an idol singer. Junichiro nicknames them "Leader" and "Idol-Sis".
Minami Kitayama (北山 みなみ, Kitayama Minami)
Voiced by: Akemi Kanda (Japanese); Megan Emerick (English)
Head maid of Heart-On-Heart café.
Kasane Kuon
Junichiro's deceased childhood friend, whose death he blames on himself.
Nayuta Kuon
Kasane's vengeful sister who forces Junichiro into deadly games.

== Media ==
=== Manga ===
Written and illustrated by Takeshi Azuma, Ultimate Otaku Teacher was serialized in Shogakukan's shōnen manga magazine Weekly Shōnen Sunday from October 2, 2011, to March 29, 2017. Shogakukan collected its chapters in 26 tankōbon volumes, released from March 16, 2012, to April 18, 2017.

==== Volumes ====
No.	Release date	ISBN
1	March 16, 2012	978-4-09-123570-1
2	June 18, 2012	978-4-09-123699-9
3	September 18, 2012	978-4-09-123817-7
4	November 16, 2012	978-4-09-124008-8
5	February 23, 2013	978-4-09-124180-1
6	April 23, 2013	978-4-09-124283-9
7	July 18, 2013	978-4-09-124352-2
8	August 16, 2013	978-4-09-124401-7
9	November 18, 2013	978-4-09-124498-7
10	February 18, 2014	978-4-09-124564-9
11	May 16, 2014	978-4-09-124644-8
12	August 23, 2014	978-4-09-125079-7
13	October 17, 2014	978-4-09-125372-9
14	January 16, 2015	978-4-09-125449-8
15	March 18, 2015	978-4-09-125697-3
16	May 18, 2015	978-4-09-126025-3
17	July 17, 2015	978-4-09-126185-4
18	September 18, 2015	978-4-09-126248-6
19	November 18, 2015	978-4-09-126500-5
20	February 18, 2016	978-4-09-126780-1
21	May 18, 2016	978-4-09-127139-6
22	June 17, 2016	978-4-09-127268-3
23	September 16, 2016	978-4-09-127335-2
24	November 18, 2016	978-4-09-127413-7
25	February 17, 2017	978-4-09-127498-4
26	April 18, 2017	978-4-09-127555-4

=== Anime ===
Two short anime clips, serving as promotion for the manga have been released, and an anime television series was produced, all of them by A-1 Pictures. Masato Sato directed the series with scripts written by Atsushi Maekawa. Isao Sugimoto designed the characters and Ryuuichi Takada composed the music. The series aired from April 4 to September 26, 2015. From episodes 1 to 12, the first opening theme is "Youthful Dreamer" by TrySail, and the ending theme is "Dreamin'" by Tokyo Performance Doll. From episodes 13 to 24, the second opening theme is "Vivid Brilliant Door" by Sphere, and the ending theme is "My Only One" by 9nine. Funimation has licensed the series in North America.
