= Mai Kanno =

Japanese voice actress (born 1998)

- 菅野 真衣
- Born: 14 August 1998 (age 28)
- Occupations: Voice actress; singer
- Years active: 2014–present
- Employer: Mausu Promotion
- Notable work: Idoly Pride as Sakura Kawasaki; My Isekai Life as Surapacchi; Re:Monster as the Redhead

Mai Kanno (菅野 真衣, Kanno Mai; born 14 August 1998) is a Japanese voice actress from Tokyo, affiliated with Mausu Promotion. She is known for starring as Sakura Kawasaki in Idoly Pride, Surapacchi in My Isekai Life, and the Redhead in Re:Monster.

== Biography ==
Mai Kanno, a native of Tokyo, was born on 14 August 1998. Originally a shy child, she joined a children's theater troupe at about five years old when her parents wanted her to become more energetic, and she decided to do voice acting after doing a Disney Channel dub. She left Gekidan Nihon Jidō in 2014 due to its age limit, but in high school became part of a "famous drama club that even participated in competitions". While in high school, she voiced the character Ai in I Can't Understand What My Husband Is Saying. She graduated from Mausu Promotion's training school in 2017 and joined the agency in 2019.

In December 2019, it was announced that Kanno would be voicing Sakura Kawasaki in the Idoly Pride franchise. She reprised her role in the anime and video game, and she also performed in several music releases as part of the tie-in unit Hoshimi Production, including the theme song of the same name. Mercedez Clewis said that Kanno's voice acting in the series was of note, saying that "the feelings [the anime] evoked during [her] initial watch this winter still resonate within me [...] in large part, due to the voice actresses, who really bring their a-game".

In 2022, Kanno voiced Surapacchi in My Isekai Life. In December 2023, it was announced she would star as the Redhead in Re:Monster.

Kanno is skilled in flick input and the kalimba. She also practices wool felting as a hobby.

On 28 July 2022, it was announced that Kanno had tested positive for COVID-19.

== Filmography ==
=== Animated television ===
Year	Title	Role	Ref.
2014	I Can't Understand What My Husband Is Saying	Ai	
2019	Aikatsu on Parade!	Kokoro Kojima	
2020	Idolish7	Audience	
2020	Sleepy Princess in the Demon Castle	Woman	
2021	Aikatsu Planet!	Audience	
2021	Idoly Pride	Sakura Kawasaki	
2021	Yuki Yuna Is a Hero: The Great Mankai Chapter		
2022	Mobile Suit Gundam: The Witch from Mercury	Student	
2022	My Dress-Up Darling	Nobara	
2022	My Isekai Life	Surapacchi	
2022	Science Fell in Love, So I Tried to Prove It	Girl	
2022	Shadows House	Liz	
2022	The Yakuza's Guide to Babysitting	Sara	
2023	My New Boss Is Goofy	Child	
2023	The Reincarnation of the Strongest Exorcist in Another World	Audience	
2023	World Dai Star	Customer	
2024	Loner Life in Another World	Gal A	
2024	Re:Monster	The Redhead	
2027	Arcanadea	Rin Kirinoue	
TBA	Promise Me the Spotlight	Awayuki Shiroi	

=== Animated film ===
Year	Title	Role	Ref.
2022	Uta no Prince-sama: Maji Love Kingdom		

=== Video games ===
Year	Title	Role	Ref.
2019	Last Period	Typica, Repair	
2020	Sakura Kakumei	Ao Kirigamine	
2021	Idoly Pride	Sakura Kawasaki	
2021	Tenka Hyakken: Zan	Kumano Sansho Gongen Nagamitsu	
2022	eBaseball Powerful Pro Baseball 2022	Ribon Ezora	
2024	SaGa: Emerald Beyond	Dolores, Noriko Midō, Yuzuki Nakato	
	Princess Connect! Re:Dive		
	Touhou LostWord	Hakurei Reimu (Karma Speed), etc.	
	Blue Archive	Motomiya Chiaki	
