= Endro! =

Japanese anime television series

- Promotional art for the series.

えんどろ～！ (Endoro~!)
- Genre: Fantasy, slice of life
- Manga
- Written by: Izumi Minami
- Published by: Hobby Japan
- Imprint: HJ Comics
- Magazine: Comic Fire
- Original run: August 9, 2018 – February 15, 2019
- Volumes: 1
- Anime television series
- Directed by: Kaori
- Produced by: Egg Firm
- Written by: Takashi Aoshima
- Music by: Yoshiaki Fujisawa
- Studio: Studio Gokumi
- Licensed by: Crunchyroll (streaming); SEA: Medialink
- Original network: Tokyo MX, BS11
- Original run: January 12, 2019 – March 30, 2019
- Episodes: 12

Endro! (Japanese: えんどろ～！, Hepburn: Endoro~!; lit. "End Roll~!") is an original Japanese anime television series produced by Studio Gokumi. The series aired in Japan between January and March 2019, and a manga adaptation was serialized from August 9, 2018, to February 15, 2019.

== Plot ==
On Naral Island, a hero named Yulia "Yusha" Chardiet and her party of friends confront the Demon Lord plaguing the Kingdom of Lapanesta. However, their sealing spell goes wrong and the girls inadvertently send the Demon Lord back in time to before Yusha became a hero. Reverted to the size of a small girl, the Demon Lord, now known as Mao, becomes a teacher at Yusha's Adventure School with the aim of expelling Yusha so that she'll never become a hero in the future.

== Characters ==
Yuusha (ユーシャ, Yūsha) / Yulia Chardiet (ユーリア・シャルデット, Yūria Sharudetto)
Voiced by: Hikaru Akao (Japanese); Amanda Lee (English)
An energetic girl who aspires to become a hero. While generally dim-witted, she has an incredible amount of luck and an unpredictable nature.
Seira (セイラ, Seira) / Ellenoar Seiran (エレノワール・セイラン, Erenowāru Seiran)
Voiced by: Shiina Natsukawa (Japanese); Alexis Tipton (English)
An elven priest who is quite knowledgeable.
Fai (ファイ) / Fai Fai (ファイ・ファイ)
Voiced by: Ari Ozawa (Japanese); Dani Chambers (English)
A powerful warrior who loves to eat, occasionally nibbling on Seira's ears when she gets hungry.
Mei (メイ) / Mather Enderstto (メイザ・エンダスト, Meiza Endasuto)
Voiced by: Inori Minase (Japanese); Trina Nishimura (English)
A mage who has an obsession with the magic cards known as Cartado.
Mao (マオ) / Demon Lord (魔王, Maō)
Voiced by: Misaki Kuno (Mao), Tesshō Genda (Demon Lord) (Japanese); Alison Viktorin (Mao), Ray Hurd (Demon Lord) (English)
The Demon Lord who was sent to the past after Yusha's sealing spell went awry. She becomes a teacher at Yusha's school in the hopes of preventing her from ever becoming a hero, but eventually gives up on the idea.
Princess Rona (ローナ姫, Rona Hime) / Rona Pricipa O'Lapanesta (ローナ・プリシパ・オ・ラパネスタ, Rona Purishipa O Rapanesuta)
Voiced by: Momo Asakura (Japanese); Amber Lee Connors (English)
The princess of the Lapanesta kingdom who dreams of marrying a hero and soon develops feelings for Yusha, enrolling in her school. She, with a special Cartado, also chronicles the activities of the 999th Hero and her party.
Chibi Dragon (ちびドラゴン, Chibi Doragon)
Voiced by: Asuka Nishi (Japanese); Lindsay Seidel (English)
A tiny dragon who assists Yusha and the others. But this tiny dragon has a secret voracious appetite--it even swallowed the Undersea Demon Yulia and her party defeated, and even the Demon Lord's Maid Golem.
Female Knight (女騎士, Onna Kishi)
Voiced by: Atsumi Tanezaki (Japanese); Morgan Berry (English)
An unnamed knight who works as a teacher at Yusha's school and gave Mao her job. She is fascinated with young girls, especially Mao.
Meigo (メイゴ) / Maid Golem (メイドゴーレム, Meido Gōremu)
Voiced by: Satomi Satō
A stone golem created specially as the Demon Lord's assistant. She is found later after Chibi Dragon vomited everything it swallowed prior, with no memories of her past. She became Mao's assistant at school and was named "Meigo."

== Media ==
=== Manga ===
A manga adaptation by Izumi Minami began serialization on Hobby Japan's Comic Fire website from August 9, 2018, to February 15, 2019. One volume was published.

=== Anime ===
The anime series is directed by Kaori and written by Takashi Aoshima, with animation by Studio Gokumi. The series' character designs are provided by Namori, and Haruko Iizuka is adapting the designs for animation. Egg Firm is producing the anime. The series aired from January 12 to March 30, 2019, on Tokyo MX and BS11. The opening theme is "End Roll!" (えんどろ〜る！, Endoro~ru!) performed by Hikaru Akao, Shiina Natsukawa, Ari Ozawa, and Inori Minase as their respective characters, and the ending theme is "Wonder Caravan!" performed by Minase. The anime series has been simulcasted by Crunchyroll.

No.	Title (Note: All English titles are taken from Crunchyroll.)	Original release date
1	"It's Still Too Soon for the End Roll!"; Transliteration: "Endorōru ni wa Mada Hayai〜！" (Japanese: エンドロールにはまだ早い〜！)	January 12, 2019
On Naral Island, a wannabe hero named Yulia "Yusha" Chardiet and her friends, priest Ellenoar "Seira" Seiran, warrior Fai Fai, and mage Mather "Mei" Enderstto, are all studying at an adventurer school, where they receive a new teacher named Mao. Unbeknownst to everyone, Mao is actually a Demon Lord from the future who was defeated by Yusha and her friends but was inadvertently sent back in time. Determined to prevent Yusha from ever becoming a hero, Mao manipulates an ancient ruin exploration challenge and sends Yusha's group the wrong way in the hopes of getting them expelled. Yusha ends up in a room where she finds a Hero's sword, only to end up activating a golem. Using the sword and their respective skills, Yusha and her friends manage to get back to their class and avoid expulsion.
2	"Demon Lord, Vanish Into the Sunset!"; Transliteration: "Maō, Yūhi ni Chiru〜！" (Japanese: 魔王、夕陽に散る～！)	January 19, 2019
As Mao prepares to send the class to begin taking quests, Yusha and the others end up unable to decide who should be the group's leader. The girls take turns as the leader, but none of them prove to be fit for the job and decide to all be leaders instead. Fearing that history will just repeat itself, Mao decides to give up on being a Demon Lord and live a normal life.
3	"Quest Practical!"; Transliteration: "Kuesuto Jisshū~!" (Japanese: クエスト実習~!)	January 26, 2019
The girls begin taking quests for their practical, but keep getting the same mundane task of searching for cats. They eventually get an actual quest but end up deciding to search for a young girl's lost cat anyway. Their search brings them to the top floor of a tower, where they fight against a powerful spider monster before finding the lost cat.
4	"Ocean, Swimsuits, and Slaying Evil Gods!"; Transliteration: "Umi to Mizugi to Jashin Tōbatsu~!" (Japanese: 海と水着と邪神討伐~!)	February 2, 2019
During summer break, the gang head to an island to investigate monsters as part of their summer homework while also playing around on the beach. While fishing for food, the girls come across a mackerelman who had accidentally released an evil god that has enslaved his friends. Offering to help, the girls face off against the evil god, who is defeated by Yusha's Hero's Sword before being eaten by their mascot Chibi Dragon.
5	"My Hero!"; Transliteration: "Watakushi no Yūsha-sama~!" (Japanese: 私の勇者様~!)	February 9, 2019
Upon hearing word that a hero has appeared, Rona Pricipa O'Lapanesta, the princess of Lapanesta, comes to adventurer school and uses a cartado that officially recognizes Yusha as a hero. Determined to make everyone appreciate Yusha, Rona holds a festival in her honor with the intention of marrying the hero. After Yusha steps in to save Mao after she inadvertently riles up a monster, Rona starts to develop genuine feelings for Yusha and transfers into her class.
6	"One Room, 100 Square Feet, Demon Lord Included!"; Transliteration: "Rokujō Hitoma, Maō Tsuki~!" (Japanese: 六畳一間, 魔王付き~!)	February 16, 2019
As Mao comes down with a fever, she reflects on how lonely her life as a Demon Lord was before she was sent back in time by Yusha. Yusha and her friends come over and decide to nurse Mao back to health. While being humbled by everyone's support, Mao recalls how she came to meet a knight who gave her a job at adventurer school.
7	"Princess Rona, Fight On!"; Transliteration: "Rōna-hime Faito~!" (Japanese: ローナ姫ファイと~!)	February 23, 2019
Wanting to know more about Yusha's friends, Rona decides to spend some time observing each of them. After witnessing Seira's responsible nature and collecting cartados with Mei, Rona accompanies Fai on a wilderness trip, where they participate in a melon eating contest. When Fai reaches her limit near the end of the final round, Rona manages to eat a melon of her own to bring her team to victory.
8	"My Yusha-sama!"; Transliteration: "Watakushi no Yūsha-sama~!" (Japanese: 私のユーシャ様~!)	March 2, 2019
Wanting to see Yusha do more heroic things, Rona asks Mao to help her put on a fake scenario, in which Rona is kidnapped by the Demon Lord and must be rescued by Yusha's party. As Mao takes on the role of Demon Lord for the final battle, Rona comes to realise that Yusha cares about saving her far more than fulfilling the role of a hero, leading her to confess about her lies and apologize for not seeing her friends for who they really are.
9	"Secret Cartado Festival!"; Transliteration: "Hisai! Karutādo Matsuri〜!" (Japanese: 秘祭！カルタード祭り～！)	March 9, 2019
Mei and the others receive an invitation to the Tarka Village, where creatures known as Tarkas are harvesting Cartado for a secret festival. Everyone then takes part in a Cartado hunt, where whoever harvests the rarest Cartado earns the title of Cartado King. Despite not managing to obtain a legendary rare, Mei manages to find an extra-large common card and becomes Cartado King. However, Mei is shocked to discover that the finale of the festival involves setting all the Cartado they found on fire.
10	"Snowy Mountain Dream!"; Transliteration: "Yukiyama no Yume~!" (Japanese: 雪山の夢~!)	March 16, 2019
Caught in the middle of a blizzard on a snowy mountain, the girls try to keep themselves from falling asleep by talking about their dreams for the future. Upon discovering that a monster known as a carta eater has lulled the others into a deep sleep, Seira dives into their dreams in order to wake them up.
11	"Final Dead End!"; Transliteration: "Fainaru Deddo Endo~!" (Japanese: ファイナルデッドエンド~!)	March 23, 2019
When Mao invites the girls over for dinner, her terrible cooking causes Chibi Dragon to spit out her old maid golem servant from her time as Demon Lord. Discovering that she has lost her memories, Mao takes in the golem, who is given the name Meigo, so she can keep an eye on her. Rona brings a Cartado to restore Meigo's memories but instead restores Yusha and the others' memories of fighting the Demon Lord and getting sent into the past. Learning about Meigo's connection to the Demon Lord, Rona attempts to take Meigo back to Lapanesta Kingdom. However, Mao, getting caught up in the moment, reveals herself as the Demon Lord and kidnaps Rona, challenging Yusha and the others to come fight her at her castle.
12	"After the End Roll..."; Transliteration: "Endorōru no Sono Saki wa..." (Japanese: エンドロールのその先は...)	March 30, 2019
As Yusha's party arrives outside of Mao's castle, Meigo informs them that heroes had a destiny of wearing down the Demon Lord's power over their 998 resurrections, revealing that Mao will cease to exist entirely if Yusha defeats her. Faced with choosing between Mao and Naral Island, Yusha returns to where she first met everyone to reaffirm why she wanted to become a hero. As Mao tries to resign to her fate to be defeated, Yusha feeds her Hero's sword to Chibi Dragon and gives up being a hero. After that, Meigo, having had the golem aspect of her being removed whilst inside Chibi Dragon, has it do the same to Mao, removing the concept of the Demon Lord's destiny from her, allowing her to live as a normal person. Although the concepts of Hero and Demon Lord no longer exists, Yusha still aspires to someday become a hero.

== Reception ==
The anime adaptation's first episode garnered generally positive reviews from Anime News Network's staff during the Winter 2019 season previews. Nick Creamer praised the premiere's flawless understanding of "visual humor and comic timing", highlighting Misaki Kuno's performance as Mao and its delivery of "familiar RPG-riffing jokes", and the production for its expressive character designs, painted backgrounds and fluid animation, concluding that: "All in all, while the "comic riffs on RPG conventions" genre space is pretty crowded, ENDRO! is executed with such consistent excellence that it gets a firm recommendation from me regardless." Paul Jensen was critical of the opening scene being "a little too gimmicky" and not funny enough to justify its screen time, but felt the series settled into its "comfortable comedic groove" by delivering well-timed punchlines without any "overt video game references" and the "reasonably strong" chemistry of its main cast, saying, "It's cute, amusing, and competently produced, so it should work just fine as long as you're in the mood for this style of comedy." Theron Martin praised it for executing "a number of surprises and atypical twists" on a "half-dozen staple fantasy tropes," concluding that "this one looks like it could be a nice little diversion from the season's heavier content." The fourth reviewer, James Beckett, saw potential in the "cute premise" but critiqued that its a "fairly rote" outing with "cliché fantasy shenanigans", concluding with: "I don't think the show is exactly for me, but it could certainly be worth checking out for anyone that needs a bit more candy in their anime diet."
