= Beatless =

Japanese light novel, manga and anime

- Cover of the novel
- Genre: Science fiction
- Serial novel
- Written by: Satoshi Hase
- Illustrated by: Redjuice
- Published by: Kadokawa Shoten
- English publisher: NA: J-Novel Club Tokyo Otaku Mode
- Magazine: Newtype
- Original run: June 10, 2011 – July 10, 2012
- Volumes: 1
- Manga
- Written by: Kila
- Published by: Kadokawa Shoten
- Imprint: Kadokawa Comics Ace Extra
- Original run: June 10, 2011 – July 10, 2012
- Volumes: 1
- Manga

Beatless: Dystopia
- Written by: Kagura Uguisu
- Published by: Kadokawa Shoten
- Magazine: Monthly Shōnen Ace
- Original run: September 22, 2012 – February 21, 2013
- Volumes: 2
- Manga

Ptolemy's Singularity
- Written by: Gun Snark
- Illustrated by: Mitsuru Ohsaki
- Published by: Kadokawa Shoten
- Magazine: Famitsu Comic Clear
- Original run: April 11, 2014 – January 15, 2018
- Volumes: 8
- Anime television series
- Directed by: Seiji Mizushima
- Produced by: Satoshi Tanaka; Hiroshi Kamei; Junichirō Tamura; Gōta Aijima; Daishi Asai; Hiroyuki Sekikawa (#1–13, 21)
- Written by: Tatsuya Takahashi; Gō Zappa; Satoshi Hase (Note: Credited as Story Supervisor (ストーリー監修, Sutōrī Kanshū).)
- Music by: Narasaki; Kz
- Studio: Diomedéa
- Licensed by: Amazon Prime Video (expired)
- Original network: MBS, TBS, BS-TBS (Animeism B2), BSN, AT-X
- Original run: January 13, 2018 – September 28, 2018
- Episodes: 24

Beatless is a Japanese science fiction serial novel written by Satoshi Hase and illustrated by Redjuice. The series has inspired three spin-off manga series and a 24-episode anime television series by Diomedéa, which aired from January to September 2018 in the Animeism programming block on MBS.

== Plot ==
In 2105, with the large scale advancement of technology, hIE's (Humanoid Interface Elements) are human-like-robots invented in the year 2057. hIEs are used as public and personal servants for society. One person, a high school student named Arato Endo, treats hIEs like humans and sees them as equals, and though he wished to buy one, his financial situation hinders him from doing so. In the middle of the night, while returning home from a grocery store run, he is violently attacked by a hIE. Seconds from death, Lacia, an abnormal hIE equipped with a weaponized coffin, comes to his aid and saves his life. In the chaos that follows, a hacked electric car threatens to run them over, and Lacia makes a deal with Arato, to assume ownership of her in exchange for her saving his life. The deal requires him to take full responsibility for her actions, to which he reluctantly agrees. Lacia warns the entranced Arato she, like all hIE's, doesn't have a soul. After owning Lacia, and bringing her home, Lacia enjoys her new, peaceful lifestyle, while Arato is dragged into a series of major events; from being hired by a company that hosts an online fashion modeling audition, to being dragged into the fighting between other escaped hIE's from Memeframe.

== Characters ==
Arato Endo (遠藤 アラト, Endō Arato)
Voiced by: Takuto Yoshinaga
Arato is the main protagonist of Beatless and a high school student, who shows sympathy to hIEs, treating them as humans. He was nearly killed by a hijacked hIE and an electric car while on his way back home from the grocery store and was saved by Lacia, whose deal he later accepted in exchange for her becoming his property.
Lacia (レイシア, Reishia)
Voiced by: Nao Tōyama
Lacia is an android/hIE equipped with a bullet-stopping device and is the main female protagonist of the series. As the Type-005 Lacia-class, she is one of 5 specialized hIEs who escaped the clutches of the Memeframe corporation. She becomes Arato's property after saving his life from a hIE and an electric car.
Kouka (紅霞, Kōka)
Voiced by: Misako Tomioka
She is the main antagonist of the Beatless series, and a supporting character of the anime adaptation. She is the Type-001 of the Lacia series and she is among the 5 Lacia-type hIEs who escaped the Tokyo Research Facility of Memeframe. She is also known as the Crimson Fog.
Snowdrop (スノウドロップ, Sunōdoroppu)
Voiced by: Hiromi Igarashi
The Lacia-series Type-002 hIE and one of the 5 specialized hIEs who escaped the facility, she specializes in creating mini-drones, in the form of flower petals that hack technology. She is one of the secondary antagonists in the series.
Saturnus (サトゥルヌス, Saturunusu) / Mariage (マリアジェ, Mariaje)
Voiced by: Shino Shimoji
Saturnus, a.k.a. Mariage, is the Type-003 Lacia-series hIE, and among the 5 hIEs to escape from the Memeframe corporation. She is one of the female protagonists. She was owned by Erica Burrows after Saturnus destroyed many hIEs, which proved Burrows worthy of her power.
Methode (メトーデ, Metōde)
Voiced by: Sora Amamiya
Methode is another antagonist of the series. As a finished model of the Type 004-Lacia series, her personality is manipulative, and ruthless. Her owner is Ryo Kaidai, and she was previously owned by the late Ginga Waterai, and recently Shiori Kaidai.
Ryo Kaidai (海内 遼, Kaidai Ryō)
Voiced by: Kaito Ishikawa
Ryo Kaidai is Arato's classmate, who follows the "Lacia-class hIE Escape Incident" with keen interest. He is the eldest son of the founder of Memeframe. He has a younger sister named Shiori Kaidai, and he currently owns the Type-004 Lacia-series, Methode.
Kengo Suguri (村主 ケンゴ, Suguri Kengo)
Voiced by: Daiki Yamashita
A classmate of Arato's. He works for the terrorist organization 'Antibody Network', after making first contact with the Lacia-class hIE, Kouka. Because of his gentle soul, he is easily swayed and conflicted on whether he should finish tasks with brutality.
Yuka Endo (遠藤 ユカ, Endō Yuka)
Voiced by: Saki Ono
Yuka is Arato's little sister, and one of the female protagonists of the series. She grows to be fond of Lacia, of whom Arato brought her into his home after his near-death experience.
Shiori Kaidai (海内 紫織, Kaidai Shiori)
Voiced by: Uki Satake
Ryo's younger sister.
Olga Suguri (村主 オーリガ, Suguri Ōriga)
Voiced by: Yuuki Wakai
Kengo's younger sister.
Erica Burrows (エリカ・バロウズ, Erika Barōzu)
Voiced by: Emiri Sumaya
Higgins (ヒギンズ, Higinzu)
Voiced by: Miyu Irino
Eliza (イライザ, Iraiza)
Voiced by: Minako Kotobuki
Astraia (アストライア, Asutoraia)
Voiced by: Ayahi Takagaki
Kirino (キリノ, Kirino)
Voiced by: Madoka Shiga
Ginga Watarai (渡来 銀河, Watarai Ginga)
Voiced by: Hiroshi Kamiya

== Media ==
=== Print ===
Satoshi Hase serialized the novel, with illustrations by Supercell member Redjuice, in Kadokawa Shoten's Newtype magazine in from 2011 to 2012. The novel was compiled and published in book form on October 10, 2012 (ISBN 978-4-04-110290-9). In 2013, Tokyo Otaku Mode began hosting an English translation of the novel, with animated versions of Redjuice's illustrations done by Wit Studio and animator Satoshi Kadowaki. During their panel at Anime Expo 2019, J-Novel Club announced a partnership with Tokyo Otaku Mode to release the novel in North America.

The novel has inspired three separate manga series. Kagura Uguisu published the two-volume manga series Beatless: Dystopia in Kadokawa's shōnen manga magazine Monthly Shōnen Ace between 2012 and 2013. A single-volume four-panel spin-off manga, titled Beatless, was published by Kila. Ptolemy's Singularity (天動のシンギュラリティ), a spin-off manga series written by Gun Snark and illustrated by Mitsuru Ohsaki, was launched on Kadokawa's Famitsu Comic Clear website on April 11, 2014, with a preview chapter having been published on March 14. It has been compiled into eight volumes.

Beatless: Dystopia

No.	Japanese release date	Japanese ISBN
1	September 22, 2012	978-4-04-120399-6
2	February 21, 2013	978-4-04-120605-8

Ptolemy's Singularity

No.	Japanese release date	Japanese ISBN
1	October 14, 2014	978-4-04-729989-4
2	February 14, 2015	978-4-04-730224-2
3	February 15, 2016	978-4-04-730964-7
4	February 15, 2016	978-4-04-730965-4
5	January 15, 2018	978-4-04-734999-5
6	February 15, 2018	978-4-04-735000-7
7	April 13, 2018	978-4-04-735101-1
8	March 30, 2019	978-4-04-735101-1

=== Anime ===
A 24-episode anime television series adaptation aired from January 13 to September 28, 2018. Episodes 21–24 are also referred to as Beatless: Final Stage. The series is directed by Seiji Mizushima at Diomedéa and written by Tatsuya Takahashi and Gō Zappa, with character designs by Hiroko Yaguchi. The first opening theme is "Error" by Garnidelia and the first ending theme is "Primalove" by ClariS. The second opening theme is "Truth." by TrySail, and the second ending theme is "Shapeless" by Tokyo Performance Doll. The series is streaming exclusively on Amazon Video worldwide.

No.	Title (Note: All episode titles taken from Amazon Video.)	Original release date
1	"Contract"	January 13, 2018
2	"Analog Hack"	January 20, 2018
3	"You'll be Mine"	January 27, 2018
4	"Automatic World"	February 3, 2018
5	"Tools for Outsourcers"	February 10, 2018
5.5	"Intermission_01"	February 17, 2018
6	"Higgins Village"	February 24, 2018
7	"Boy meets Pornography"	March 3, 2018
8	"Awakening of Sleeping Beauty"	March 10, 2018
9	"My Whereabouts"	March 17, 2018
9.5	"Intermission_02"	March 24, 2018
10	"Dwellings and Surroundings"	March 31, 2018
11	"Dystopia Game"	April 7, 2018
12	"Slumber of Human"	April 14, 2018
13	"The Prayer Within"	April 28, 2018
14	"An Answer to Survive"	May 5, 2018
14.5	"Intermission_03"	May 12, 2018
15	"Edge Line"	May 19, 2018
16	"Plus One"	May 26, 2018
16.5	"Intermission_04"	June 2, 2018
17	"A Reason of Our Own"	June 9, 2018
18	"Protocol of Love"	June 16, 2018
19	"Paper Tiger"	June 23, 2018
20	"Our Error World"	June 30, 2018
21	"Higgin's Silo"	September 26, 2018
22	"Pygmalion"	September 27, 2018
23	"Beatless"	September 28, 2018
24	"Boy Meets Girl"	September 28, 2018
