= Freedom Wars =

2014 video game

- Developer: Dimps (Note: Additional work by Japan Studio and Shift)
- Publishers: Sony Computer Entertainment; Bandai Namco Entertainment (Remastered)
- Director: Takashi Tsukamoto
- Producer: Junichi Yoshizawa
- Designer: Toshiyuki Yasui
- Composer: Kemmei Adachi
- Platforms: PlayStation Vita; Remastered; PlayStation 4 PlayStation 5 Nintendo Switch; Windows
- Release: JP: June 26, 2014; NA: October 28, 2014; EU: October 29, 2014; Remastered: JP: January 9, 2025; WW: January 10, 2025
- Genre: Action role-playing
- Modes: Single-player, multiplayer

Freedom Wars (Note: Japanese: フリーダムウォーズ, Hepburn: Furīdamu Wōzu) is a 2014 action role-playing video game developed by Dimps and published by Sony Computer Entertainment for the PlayStation Vita. Set in the distant future where the majority of humankind is imprisoned in penal city-states known as Panopticons which wage war against one another, the game involves players cooperating to fight enemies and contribute towards their Panopticon. The game was one of the most successful first-party PlayStation Vita titles in Japan, achieving the second highest all-time opening sales for Vita software sold there.

A remastered port published by Bandai Namco Entertainment, titled Freedom Wars Remastered released on PlayStation 4, PlayStation 5, Nintendo Switch, and Microsoft Windows on January 10, 2025.

== Gameplay ==
In-game screenshot showing the combat interface

The game is a third-person battle action game, and features local and online multiplayer functionality, both co-operative and competitive, for up to eight players. The game features a grappling whip that the player can use to zip across the battlefield and pull giant enemies to the ground. Different classes of thorns also grant various special techniques, such as traps, healing, and shields. Players fight alongside androids known as Accessories which provide combat support during missions; the player gives a set of commands to their Accessory that they execute, which include holding a position, collecting materials, or rescuing civilians.

The game features a system known as the "League of Panopticons", where players are separated into 47 Panopticons within the Japanese version of the game, with each representing one of Japan's 47 prefectures, and 50 Panopticons representing select global cities within the Asian and western localised releases. Each Panopticon competes with the others in development, where players set out to seek natural resources and invade other Panopticons. Developed Panopticons have the capability to place other ones under their control, and leaderboards are used to compare each City-State. Within this mode, criminals fight amongst other criminals from rival Panopticons. At the end of each mission, players can choose to give the materials they collect to the Panopticon as a "contribution" which reduces their sentence and adds points to their Panopticon on the leaderboards, or they can keep the material for personal use later on; however, refusal to hand over certain prohibited material will result in the player being penalized with additional years in their sentence. The top few Panopticons with the highest total score are granted special rewards and bonuses.

Missions involve players fighting against giant mechanized weapons known as Abductors, and rescuing civilians captured by them. Accessories can be abducted by enemy Abductors once they have fallen, and in such cases the player is required to rescue them. There are also item collection and capture the flag missions. In some missions, players will need to fight against other teams from other Panopticons, and attempt to rescue civilians for their own side. Players collect resources known as abductor parts which fall from enemies, which are used for crafting or contributing to the Panopticon; those who contribute to their Panopticon are rewarded with customisation options for their accessory and player appearance. At the beginning of the game, the player has no rights, and is required to "buy" back their privileges to do certain things using points gained from contributions in the form of entitlement requests, such as lying down or walking more than five steps in their prison cell, customising their appearance, or having access to certain weapons; violating any restrictions results in a penalty of years being added to the player's sentence. The Japanese and other Asian versions of the game utilise text-to-speech functionality to generate accessory voices triggered during the game which can be customised by the player.

Weapons are categorised into six groups, namely small swords, large swords, spears, personal firearms, multipurpose firearms, and squad support firearms. Hammer-type weapons and longswords also fall within the large sword category, sniper rifles, submachine guns and shotguns are included amongst personal firearms, whilst the squad support and multipurpose firearm categories include weapons such as gatling guns, laser guns, rocket launchers, flamethrowers and net guns. Weapons feature varying degrees of rarity, attributes and perks, and players are able to equip two simultaneously, whilst Accessories are able to equip one. Weapons can be collected off the field, or they can be crafted and enhanced. Consumable items vary from healing items to combat types such as grenades and land mines, and the player can equip boosters which provide in-combat modifiers. Production, modification and strengthening of weapons and consumable items takes up real-world time determined by the Vita's system clock, gives outcomes that are randomised to some degree, and occurs at the weapons plant, medical supply plant, and auxiliary arms plant; resource accumulation and management is an important aspect of the game.

The game offers a selection of five different control schemes that cater to different players' suitabilities; the default and dash types are suited to general players of third-person action games, the hunter type is suited to players who prefer the control layout of games such as Monster Hunter and Gods Eater Burst on the PlayStation Portable, which allows the player to control the camera via "finger clawing" the directional pad as an alternative to the right analog stick, the shooter type is suited to players of third-person shooting games who prefer shooting firearms via the shoulder keys, and the technical type allows the player to switch between actions that bind to the right shoulder key. All control schemes are compatible with DualShock 3 and DualShock 4 controllers, for players using a PlayStation Vita TV.

== Story ==
=== Setting ===
Freedom Wars takes place on Earth, in the year 102014. (Note: Within the English localisation. The original Japanese version introduces the game as being set in the year 102013.) The world surface lies in ruins and is no longer capable of supporting life. As such, humans live in underground cities called "Panopticons", where they struggle to research how to be able to live on the surface once more. A Panopticon functions as an artificial nation in the form of a city state that provides security for its inhabitants, in exchange for contributions each inhabitant is obligated to make towards the state. This system forms the overall societal structure of each separate Panopticon, which were created following the disintegration and demise of countries. Due to lack of resources, each Panopticon has developed conflicts with others, and large portions of the populace are forced into serving sentences in order for these cities to maintain effective control. All inhabitants of a Panopticon are constantly watched by the state to ensure they abide by the draconian laws put into place, essentially forming a collective of dystopian surveillance societies at war with one another.

Criminals serving sentences are forced into providing labor for the state, in the form of participation in war as "volunteers", in order to regain their freedom. Overpopulation has become such an issue that the Panopticons have implemented a drastic measure: anyone arrested for any crime is found guilty, regardless of whether or not they actually are. Based on the philosophy that newborns waste resources, the very existence of a person is a crime; more than 100 million people serve as criminals throughout the world. Criminals are forced to battle giant monsters called "Abductors" as punishment. Defeating the Abductors, which are known to capture civilians, reduces the Criminals' sentences, which start at 1,000,000 years. Criminals are placed under constant surveillance and have their rights stripped; personal rights can only be gradually regained through labor. Surveillance of criminals occurs in the form of dual-purpose androids known as Accessories, which watch over criminals whilst serving as partners to them during combat.

The player assumes the role of a young male/female customisable protagonist who received a prison sentence of 1,000,000 years for "the crime of living" upon their birth. While in a restricted area deep within the Panopticon, the protagonist stumbles upon and rescues a captive woman named Beatrice Anastasi from a secret facility. She is a human from On High (天獄, tengoku; lit. "sky prison"), a city-state that exists in the sky which has a high degree of civilization and technological prowess that frequently makes incursions and assaults against the humans living on the earth, during events known as "retribution" (天罰, tenbatsu; lit. "divine punishment"). Eventually the protagonist's Panopticon comes under attack from the hostile Hourai Panopticon, home to Abel Balt, one of the world's most powerful criminals.

== Development ==
Demonstration of the game's unique text to voice functionality used for Accessory customisation. This feature was removed in the North American and European releases.

A teaser trailer for the game was released on May 16, 2013, which led to the assumption that the game would be named Panopticon. On May 21, 2013, the game was revealed to actually be named Freedom Wars. Development for the game began in March 2011, two years before it was first announced to the public in 2013. According to Junichi Yoshizawa, development was distributed amongst the various studios involved; Shift was allocated the task of game and character design, in addition to storywriting, whilst Dimps was responsible for programming, graphics and direction. On June 12, 2014, the first playable open beta test of the game was released on the Japanese PlayStation Network.

During the SCE Worldwide Studios keynote speech at the 2014 Taipei Game Show, producer Junichi Yoshizawa announced that the game would have a simultaneous release in Japan and Asia, and would also be localised in both Japanese and Traditional Chinese. Sony Computer Entertainment later announced in April 2014 that the game would be localized for a western release. North America and Europe both have physical retail releases of the game. A Korean language localization was also announced and later released on August 7, 2014. The Chinese-language version of the game released in Taiwan and throughout Southeast Asia was released on the same day. Whilst the Japanese version of the game features a map of Japan's 47 prefectures for its competitive multiplayer mode, the Chinese-localization Asian version was announced to have players select Panopticons from regions such as Taiwan, Malaysia and Singapore. According to Nick Accordino who is in charge of the western localisation, the English release would feature 50 Panopticons based on cities located around the world.

At the Japanese launch, the game features the singleplayer story, free volunteer missions, four-player ad-hoc co-operative play, and Panopticon leaderboard rankings in City-State War mode; later updates after launch introduce new missions and additional features. The 1.04 update patch released on July 11, 2014 adds changes to game difficulty, including enemy spawning times in certain missions and allowing the thorn to be used whilst dashing. In addition, new control schemes are introduced. The 1.10 patch released on August 1, 2014, introduces infrastructure mode online play, voice chat, invasion missions against enemy Panopticons, and the ability to play story missions with other people. On October 16, 2014, the 1.20 patch introduced support for eight players in online player-versus-player mode, and the Ideology War game mode. The 1.20 update for the western localisation of the game was released on day one of the North American release.

Ahead of the 2014 Gamestart Asia convention in Singapore, producer Yoshizawa explained during an interview that the setting of the game is intended to act as a social commentary for modern society, with the game's imprisonment system being used as a comparison with government taxation imposed on a country's citizens, a system that individuals taking part within may often find unreasonable.

=== Server closure ===
On 19 November 2021 it was announced via the Japanese PlayStation Vita Online Service Information website that the servers for Freedom Wars would be terminated on 24 December that year.

== Media ==
CD cover of Super Contribution Propaganda Music Collection, depicting (from left to right) Opti, Connie and Panna

Two music videos were released on Niconico to promote the game prior to its release, featuring the original songs "Let's Contribute: Imprisonment of Love for 1,000,000 years" (Let's貢献 ～恋の懲役は1,000,000年～) performed by Shiina Natsukawa, Sora Amamiya and Momo Asakura, and "Panopticon Songs of Labor No.1" (パノプティコン労働歌 第一) performed by Momo Asakura. The songs are sung by a fictional in-universe Japanese idol girl group known as the "Propaganda Idols", who are tasked with spreading government propaganda to the masses and keeping the population under control. A third promotional song, a cover of the Kagamine Rin song "Nananana" (ナナナナ) performed by Sora Amamiya and arranged by Kemmei Adachi alongside Oppiroge P, surfaced on the day the game was released in Japan. The final in-character solo track by Shiina Natsukawa, titled "Ibara Lullaby" (イバラララバイ), was introduced on August 1, 2014, following the game's first major update.

The original game soundtrack was released in Japan on July 23, 2014, and features three CDs covering 46 music tracks. A music CD titled "Contribution Girls: Super Contribution Propaganda Music Collection" (貢献Girls：『超貢献推進楽曲集』) featuring four promotional songs for the game sung by the fictional propaganda idols Panna, Opti and Connie was sold by Sony Computer Entertainment Japan Asia at Comiket 86 on August 15, 2014.

A spinoff novelisation written by Masachika Kobayashi and illustrated by Kei Watanabe and Erika Ide was announced under the title Freedom Wars: Blue Thorn of Prison (フリーダムウォーズ 牢獄のアオイバラ), and began serialisation on August 28, 2014.

== Reception ==
Reception

Aggregate score
Aggregator	Score
Metacritic	73/100

Review scores
Publication	Score
Destructoid	8/10
Eurogamer	5/10
Famitsu	35/40
GameRevolution	4/5
GameSpot	8/10
Hardcore Gamer	3/5
IGN	8/10

Freedom Wars received "mixed or average" reviews according to aggregator Metacritic, with a score of 73/100. Famitsu gave Freedom Wars a review score of 35/40. 4gamer notes in their play trial that the game provides tightly packed content with plenty of customisation options. A review by Inside from Japan praised the game for its graphical and overall performance, in addition to the amount of detail placed into the game, however did find that enemy infantry often seemed overpowered during higher missions, raising the difficulty level of the game during these later stages.

Destructoid called Freedom Wars the biggest PS Vita release in 2014. IGN's Colin Moriarty writes that the game features plenty of content to keep the player occupied, and never forces them to play alone or online, allowing the player to choose their own pace progressing through the game. Hardcore Gamer rated the game 3.5 out of 5, describing it as a solid action RPG with good premise and deep themes, albeit feeling repetitive at times. PlayStation Universe gave Freedom Wars an 8.5/10 score, noting that the narrative and customization were positive aspects, even though the endgame relies on a large amount of grinding. PS Nation notes that the singleplayer and multiplayer modes are enjoyable overall, and that the game plays well on a PlayStation TV device, giving a score of 9/10.

=== Sales ===
The game sold 188,888 physical retail copies within the first week of release in Japan, taking first place within the Japanese software sales rankings for that particular week, and maintaining the top charting position for the first two weeks in a row due to continued high sales during the following week immediately after. During its opening week, the game sold through approximately 80-100% of its initial shipment. Freedom Wars was also the most purchased digital download game from the Japanese region PlayStation Store within the first two weeks following release. The game sold 35,000 digital copies within the first month in Japan, adding up to a total of approximately 300,000 digital and physical copies. Freedom Wars marks one of the highest openings of a new first-party Sony Computer Entertainment intellectual property in Japan, and is the second highest opening PS Vita title behind God Eater 2 and ahead of both Hatsune Miku: Project DIVA f and Toukiden: The Age of Demons. According to Media Create, Japanese retailers state that the primary demographic of customers purchasing the game were students, and that platform penetration of the Vita slightly increased amongst that particular audience.

== Remaster ==
In September 2024, it was announced that a remastered version of the game called Freedom Wars Remastered would release on January 10, 2025. The game was released by Bandai Namco. Its improvements include 4K resolution support and a 60 frames per second frame rate. However, on Nintendo Switch, the game runs at a maximum resolution of 1080p at 30 frames per second. Other improvements include adjusted game balance, a new "Deadly Sinner" difficulty mode, high-resolution textures, and control customization.

All previously released downloadable content is included, along with the option to choose English or Japanese audio. Freedom Wars Remastered released on PlayStation 5, PlayStation 4, PC, and Nintendo Switch. The Nintendo Switch and PlayStation 5 versions are available both physically and digitally, whereas the PlayStation 4 and PC versions is only available digitally.
