= TrySail =

Japanese girl group

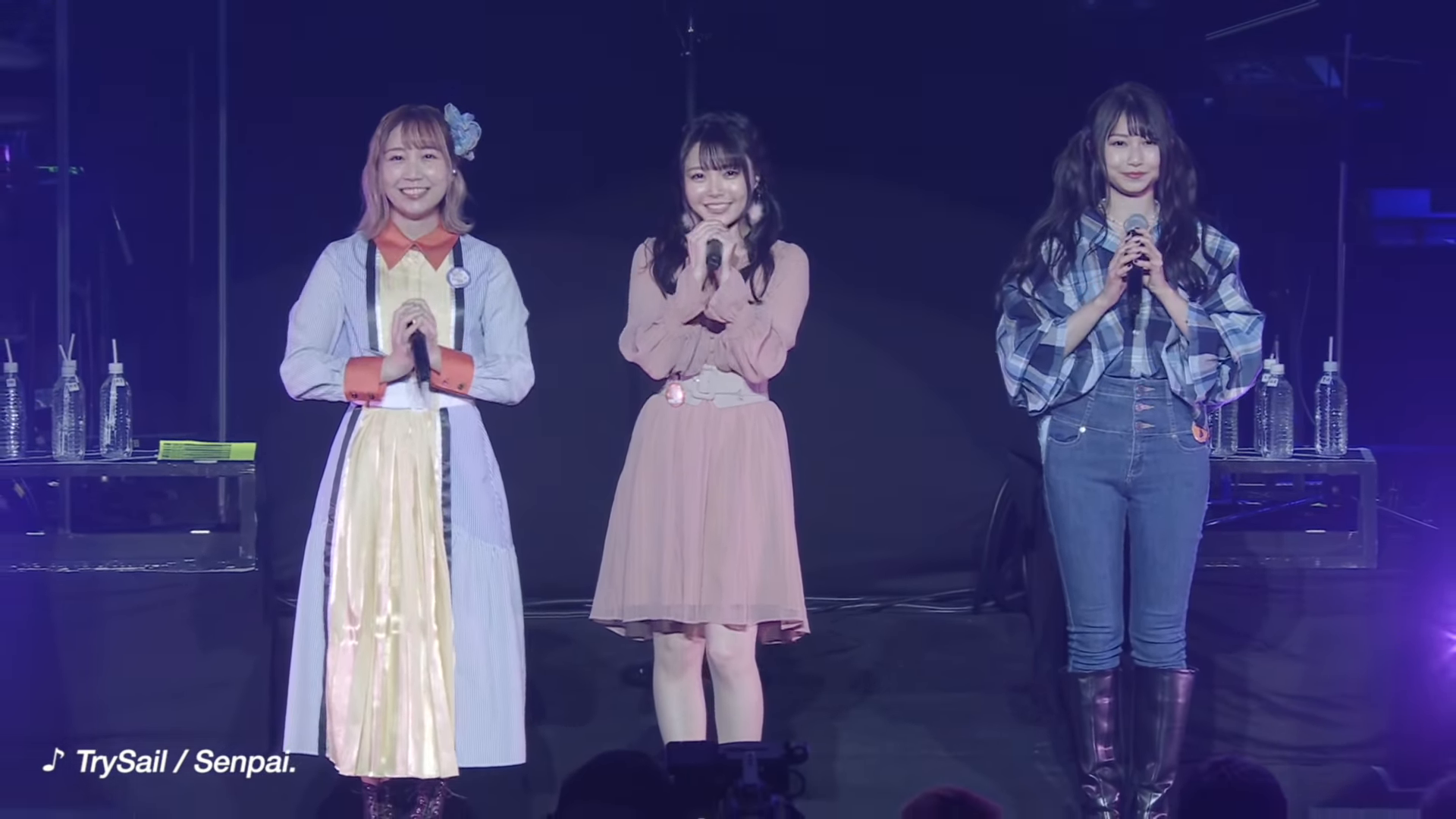

Background information
- Origin: Tokyo, Japan
- Genres: J-pop; anime song
- Years active: 2015–present
- Labels: Aniplex (2015–2017); Sacra Music (2017–present)
- Members: Momo Asakura; Sora Amamiya; Shiina Natsukawa
- Website: trysail.jp

YouTube information
- Channel: TrySail（麻倉もも・雨宮天・夏川椎菜）Official YouTube Channel
- Years active: 2019–present
- Genre: Music
- Subscribers: 103 thousand
- Views: 30 million

TrySail are a Japanese girl group. The members of the group are Momo Asakura, Sora Amamiya and Shiina Natsukawa; all of them are also voice actresses who are all managed by Sony's Music Ray'n subdivision. Their February 2016 single "Whiz" reached the fourth place on the weekly Oricon Singles Chart, and was used as a theme song for the original net animation Koyomimonogatari. Their subsequent single "High Free Spirits" was used as the opening theme to the original anime series High School Fleet, in which all three members have voice roles.

In 2017, the group's single "Original" was used as the opening theme song for the anime Interviews with Monster Girls. TrySail moved from Aniplex to the new record label Sacra Music (both under Sony Music Entertainment Japan) in April 2017. Their single "Adrenaline!!!" is the ending theme of the anime Eromanga Sensei.

On 2018, the group released single "Wanted Girl", and "Truth.". Both songs are used as the second opening theme of Time Bokan 24 second season and the second opening theme of Beatless, respectively. On January 1, 2019, "adrenaline!!!" was selected for the Heisei Anison Grand Prix Voice Actor Song Award (2010 - 2019). In 2020 and 2021, they released the singles "Gomakashi" and "Lapis" which were respectively used as the OP and ED for the Puella Magi Madoka Magica spinoff Magia Record: the group also provided voices for the three main characters. That same year, the group's members also appeared in the mixed-media project Idoly Pride, voicing the in-game group TRINITYAiLE.

== Members ==
- Momo Asakura, nicknamed Mocho (もちょ).
- Sora Amamiya, nicknamed Sora-chan (天ちゃん) and Ten-chan (てんちゃん), since in Japanese, the kanji for her given name can also be read as "Ten".
- Shiina Natsukawa, nickname Nansu (ナンス).

== Discography ==
=== Studio albums ===
Title	Album details	Oricon peak chart
Sail Canvas	Released: May 25, 2016; Label: Aniplex	5
Tailwind	Released: August 23, 2017; Label: Sacra Music	3
TryAgain	Released: February 27, 2019; Label: Sacra Music	8
Re Bon Voyage	Released: September 15, 2021; Label: Sacra Music	5
SuperBloom	Released: July 19, 2023; Label: Sacra Music	13

=== Singles ===
Title	Release date	Oricon
"Youthful Dreamer"	May 13, 2015	12
"Cobalt"	August 19, 2015	15
"Whiz"	February 10, 2016	4
"High Free Spirits"	May 11, 2016	10
"Original."	February 8, 2017	7
"Adrenaline!!!"	May 24, 2017	6
"Wanted Girl"	March 14, 2018	12
"Truth."	June 6, 2018	11
"azure"	November 14, 2018	10
"Utsuroi"	October 2019	
"Free Turn"	January 22, 2020	11
"Gomakashi/Utsuroi"	March 11, 2020	5
"Taga tame ni Ai wa Naru"	June 9, 2021	10
"Lapis"	April 6, 2022	7
"Hanarenai kyori"	June 8, 2022	12
"Karei wantan/Follow You!"	May 31, 2023	13
"Micro Revolution"	August 7, 2024	19
"Sonna Bokura no Boukentan!"	February 19, 2025	7

=== Collaborations singles ===
Title	Collaborations with	Release date	Oricon
"Senpai."	HoneyWorks (under the name "HoneyWorks meets TrySail")	December 14, 2016	8
