= Kaoru Sakura =

Japanese voice actress and singer

- 佐倉薫
- Born: 29 September 1990 (age 35)
- Occupation: Voice actress
- Years active: 2011–present
- Employer: Remax
- Notable work: Witch in Puyo Puyo; Nagi Kobotoke in Chunithm and Irodorimidori; Koharun in The Lost Village; Chitose Kurosaki in The Idolmaster Cinderella Girls

Kaoru Sakura (Japanese: 佐倉 薫, Hepburn: Sakura Kaoru; born 29 September 1990) is a Japanese voice actress from Yamaguchi Prefecture, affiliated with Remax. She is known for voicing Witch in the Puyo Puyo video game series, Nagi Kobotoke in Chunithm and its spinoff Irodorimidori, Koharun in The Lost Village, Chitose Kurosaki in The Idolmaster Cinderella Girls, and Eru Amami in D Cide Traumerei.

== Biography ==
Kaoru Sakura, a native of Shūnan, Yamaguchi Prefecture, was born on 29 September 1990. She was part of a broadcasting club with only two members while in junior high school. She decided to start a voice acting career because after playing the visual novel Kamaitachi no Yoru, she thought it would be interesting if it had dialogue, which the game lacks due to being a Super Nintendo Entertainment System game. She was educated at Remax Attached Training School, and her first starring role was in the 2014 American film Ask Me Anything; she later recalled that she had done the job with Yōko Honna.

In 2011, Sakura began voicing Witch in the Puyo Puyo video game series. The producer of Puyo Puyo, Mizuki Hosoyamada, remarked that she mistook Sakura for Witch the first time he heard her voice, and Sakura herself listened to every other voice of Witch in order to protect the fandom's illusion toward Witch. She also regularly appears on the Puyo Puyo Channel and Puyo Quest Namahōsō Niconico channels, and she often mentions that she is the same age as the Puyo Puyo series.

Sakura voices Chitose Kurosaki in The Idolmaster Cinderella Girls, a sub-franchise in The Idolmaster franchise. Since then, she has performed as a singer on several Idolmaster music releases, including the 2020 single "The Idolmaster Cinderella Starlight Master for the Next! 01: True Colors" and the 2021 single "The Idolmaster Cinderella Girls Starlight Master 38: Fascinate" (which both charted at #7 in the Oricon Singles Chart).

Sakura voices Nagi Kobotoke, the fictional keyboardist for the in-universe band Irodorimidori in Chunithm, and she reprised her role in the 2022 Irodorimidori anime. She also starred as Koharun in The Lost Village (2016), Chiko Sekino in Dropout Idol Fruit Tart (2020), Eru Amami in D Cide Traumerei (2021).

In addition to voice acting, Sakura appears in music videos and works as a parts model. Originally working in video production prior to her voice acting debut, her first job was on TV Asahi's late-night variety show SmaSTATION!!. In November 2017, as part of Moe Summit 7, she was appointed as station master-for-a-day at Tokuyama Station.

One of Sakura's special skills is archery, having been part of an archery club in high school. Another of her special skills is swimming, having practiced the hobby since kindergarten.

== Filmography ==
=== Animated television ===
Year	Title	Role	Ref.
2013	Kurokan	Hitomi Kunieda	
2015	Dance with Devils	female student, etc.	
2015	Durarara!!	female clerk	
2016	The Lost Village	Koharun	
2017	Anonymous Noise	woman 3	
2017	Grimoire of Zero	beautiful woman B, Magic Corps member A	
2017	Hinako Note	woman, clerk	
2017	Scum's Wish	elementary school student A, female student	
2019	Outburst Dreamer Boys	Kujuku Tsukiho, Kujuku Haruka	
2019	Rifle Is Beautiful	Takae Tachibana	
2019	The Quintessential Quintuplets	Otori	
2020	D4DJ First Mix		
2020	Dropout Idol Fruit Tart	Chiko Sekino	
2020	Interspecies Reviewers	Miss Clula	
2021	D Cide Traumerei	Eru Amami	
2022	Irodorimidori	Nagi Kobotoke	
2025	The Mononoke Lecture Logs of Chuzenji-sensei	Yukie	

=== Animated film ===
Year	Title	Role	Ref.
2009	Mai Mai Miracle	high school girl	
2016	Pop in Q	Jerry, etc.	

=== Original video animation ===
Year	Title	Role	Ref.
2012	Saikyō Jump Spy Penguin	lady	
2014	Sakura Cupusule	Mahiru's senpai	

=== Original net animation ===
Year	Title	Role	Ref.
2012	Yahabee	Kagome	
2013	Double Hard	Mai Sugiura	
2013	Tomotoon! Sakura Taisen	female customer	
2016	Jewelpet: Attack Chance?!	Ruri	
2019	The Idolmaster Cinderella Girls 8th Anniversary Special Project: Spin-off!	Chitose Kurosaki	

=== Video games ===
Year	Title	Role	Ref.
2011	Puyo Puyo	Witch, Sylph	
2013	Mugen Souls Z	Sharefull	
2014	Sword Art Online: Code Register	Aya	
2015	Chunithm	Nagi Kotoboke	
2015	Durarara!! Relay	Saika, high school girl, others	
2015	Trillion: God of Destruction	rabbit maid	
2016	Genkai Tokki: Seven Pirates	Neko	
2016	Shadowverse	Isabelle	
2016	Summon Night 6	Claret	
2018	Shōjo Kageki Revue Starlight: Re LIVE	Elle Nishino	
2019	13 Sentinels: Aegis Rim	Natsuno Minami	
2019	The Idolmaster Cinderella Girls	Chitose Kurosaki	
2020	Arknights	Andreana	
2020	Last Period	Teonia, Alicia	
2021	D Cide Traumerei	Eru Amami	
2021	Touhou Danmaku Kagura	Reisen Udongein Inaba	
2025	Blue Archive	Nagusa Goryou	
