= Mayoiga =

In Japanese folklore, a well-kept but abandoned house

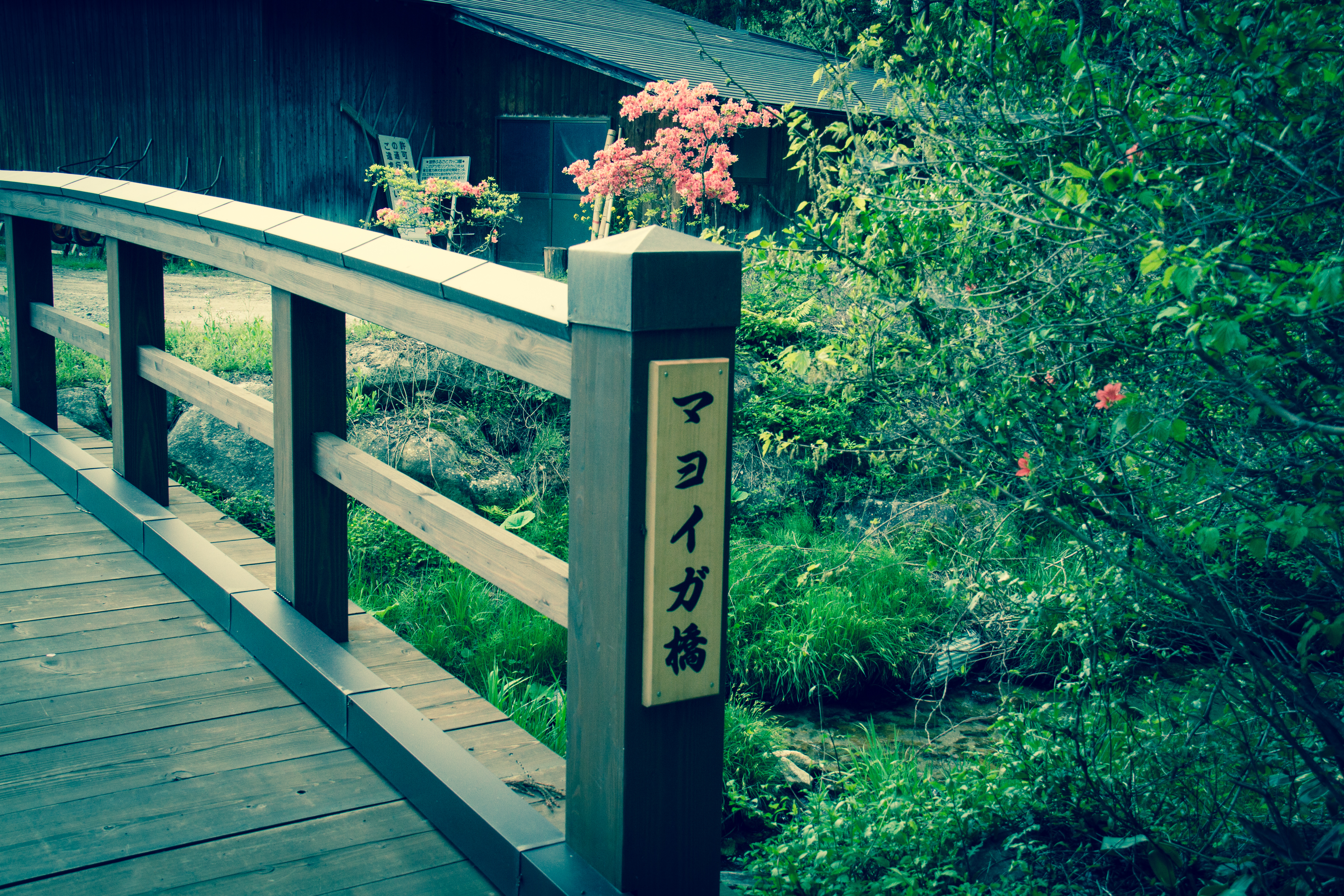
Mayoiga Bridge in Iwate prefecture

Mayoiga (Japanese: 迷い家) in Japanese folklore refers to a "lavish" or "well-kept" but abandoned house found in remote parts of the mountains or similar wilderness.

== Folklore ==
This legend became widely known when the folklorist Kunio Yanagita introduced a story he had heard from Kiyoshi Sasaki, a native of Tsuchibuchi Village, Iwate Prefecture (now Tono City), in chapters 63 and 64 of the Tales of Tono (1910).

According to the Tales of Tono, Mayoi-ya is a mysterious house that bestows wealth and honor to all who visit, and visitors are allowed to take any one item from the house. However, not everyone can enjoy this blessing. "Rokusan" tells the success story of the wife of the Miura family, who was granted wealth because she was selfless, while "Rokushi" tells the failure story of a young man who lost his wealth because he guided a greedy villager.

== Popular culture ==
The titular house in The House of the Lost on the Cape by Sachiko Kashiwaba is named "Mayoiga" after the folklore.

== See also ==
- Japanese haunted towns
- Misaki no Mayoiga
- The Lost Village (TV series)
