= Irodorimidori =

Japanese anime television series

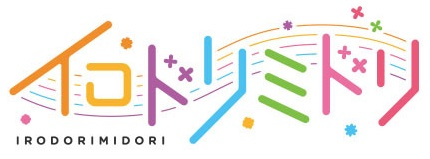

イロドリミドリ
- Genre: Musical; Slice of life
- Created by: Frontwing; Sega
- Anime television series
- Directed by: Chihaya Tanaka
- Written by: Chihaya Tanaka; Rei Ishikura
- Music by: D.watt
- Studio: Akatsuki
- Licensed by: Crunchyroll
- Original network: Tokyo MX, AT-X
- Original run: January 5, 2022 – February 23, 2022
- Episodes: 8

Irodorimidori (イロドリミドリ) is a Japanese anime television series by Akatsuki based on the in-game band of the same name from Sega's Chunithm action-rhythm game. It aired from January to February 2022.

== Characters ==
Serina Akesaka (明坂 芹菜, Akesaka Serina)
Voiced by: Emi Nitta
Aliciana Ogata (御形 アリシアナ, Ogata Arishiana)
Voiced by: Ayaka Fukuhara
Nazuna Tennozu (天王洲 なずな, Tennozu Nazuna)
Voiced by: Ayano Yamamoto
Nagi Kobotoke (小仏 凪, Kobotoke Nagi)
Voiced by: Kaoru Sakura
Naru Hakobe (箱部 なる, Hakobe Naru)
Voiced by: M.A.O

== Production and release ==
In November 2021, it was announced that Frontwing would be producing a short anime series for Irodorimidori, one of the in-game bands from Chunithm. The series' animation was produced by Akatsuki with direction from Chihaya Tanaka, while Tanaka and Rei Ishikura wrote the scripts. D.watt composed the music. It aired for 8 episodes from January 5 to February 23, 2022, on Tokyo MX and AT-X.

=== Episode list ===
No.	Title	Original release date
1	"Get Members!"; Transliteration: "Menbā o Getto!" (Japanese: メンバーをゲット！)	January 5, 2022
2	"Get Words!"; Transliteration: "Tango o Getto!" (Japanese: 単語をゲット！)	January 12, 2022
3	"Get Motivated!"; Transliteration: "Yaruki o Getto!" (Japanese: やる気をゲット！)	January 19, 2022
4	"Get the Title!"; Transliteration: "Taitoru o Getto!" (Japanese: タイトルをゲット！)	January 26, 2022
5	"Get an Unknown Paper!"; Transliteration: "Michi no Kami o Getto!" (Japanese: 未知の紙をゲット！)	February 2, 2022
6	"Get your Pajamas!"; Transliteration: "Pajama o Getto!" (Japanese: パジャマをゲット！)	February 9, 2022
7	"Get the Production!"; Transliteration: "Honban o Getto!" (Japanese: 本番をゲット！)	February 16, 2022
8	"Get Credit!"; Transliteration: "Tan'i o Getto!" (Japanese: 単位をゲット！)	February 23, 2022
