= Dajare =

Japanese form of comic word play

Dajare (駄洒落; "poor humor") is a kind of comic Japanese word play, similar in spirit to a pun that relies on similarities in the pronunciation of words to create a simple joke.

Dajare are popular in advertising. Dajare are also associated with oyaji gags (親父ギャグ, oyaji gyagu), oyaji meaning "old man", as an "old man" would be considered by the younger generation most likely to attempt dajare, making them a near equivalent of what would be called "dad jokes" in English.

== Examples ==
=== With one speaker ===
Example one:

- アルミ缶の上にある蜜柑 (arumi kan no ue ni aru mikan)

Translation:
An orange on an aluminum can.
Explanation:
アルミ (arumi) means "aluminum" and 缶 (kan) means "can"; ある (aru) means "to exist" and 蜜柑 (mikan) refers to mandarin varieties popular in Japan.

Example two:

- ウランは売らん (uran wa uran)

Translation:
I don't sell uranium.
Explanation:
ウラン (uran) means uranium, and the second 売らん (uran) = uranai (negative form of uru (to sell)) means "not sell".

Example three:

- ニューヨークで入浴 (nyūyōku de nyūyoku)

Translation:
Taking a bath in New York.
Explanation:
ニューヨーク (nyūyōku) means New York, 入浴 (nyūyoku) means taking a bath.

Example four:

- レモンの入れもん (remon no iremon)

Translation:
A container for a lemon
Explanation:
レモン (remon) means "a lemon", 入れもん (iremon) = iremono means "a container".

Example five:

- 布団が吹っ飛んだ (futon ga futtonda)

Translation:
Futon was blown away.
Explanation:
布団 (futon) means "Japanese style mattress", 吹っ飛んだ (futtonda) means "to have been blown away".

=== With two speakers ===
Example one:

A: 大食いのたけし君も、宇宙ではあまり物を食べられないよ。 (ōgui no takeshi kun mo, uchū dewa amari mono o taberarenaiyo)
B: なぜ? (naze)
A: 宇宙には空気(食う気)がない。 (uchū niwa kūki ga nai)
Translation:
A: In space, even a glutton like Takeshi can't eat anything.
B: Why's that?
A: In space, there is no air.
Explanation:
Kūki (くうき) can mean either "air" (空気) or "appetite" (食う気), thus the last phrase could be interpreted as "in space, (he has) no appetite".

Example two:

A: 向こうの通りにヘイができたんだってね。(mukou no tōri ni hei ga dekitan datte ne)
B: へぇー。(hee...)
Translation:
A: I hear they finished the wall on the street over there.
B: Well!
Explanation:
The word for "fence" or "wall" here (塀, hei) sounds very similar to the Japanese interjection hee (へえ, similar in usage to the phrases "oh yeah?" and "well!"), thus the answer sounds like a repeat of the information in the initial statement.
Another version of this same joke replaces hei with kakoi (囲い), which sounds similar to a word meaning something like "cool" or "looks good" (かっこいい).

=== Children's dajare (with one speaker) ===
There are also some jokes mostly used by children that resemble dajare. These are also considered jokes that "everybody knows" in most parts of Japan. These are examples of ginatayomi (ぎなた読み), involving ambiguity in where one word ends and another begins, like garden-path sentences in English.

Example one:

「パン作ったことある」(pan tsukutta koto aru; Have you ever made bread before?)
Can also be interpreted as:
「パンツ食ったことある」(pantsu kutta koto aru; Have you ever eaten underpants before?)

Example two:

「ねぇ、ちゃんとお風呂入ってる」(nee, chanto ofuro haitteru; Hey, have you been bathing regularly?)
Can also be interpreted as:
「姉ちゃんとお風呂入ってる」(nee-chan to ofuro haitteru; Do you take baths with your older sister?)

== See also ==
- Owarai
- Homophone
- Japanese superstitions
