= D Cide Traumerei =

Japanese media franchise

- D_Cide Traumerei
- Created by: Sumzap; Drecom; Bushiroad
- Video game
- Developer: Sumzap; Drecom
- Genre: Role-playing game
- Platform: Android, iOS
- Released: JP: September 30, 2021
- Anime television series

D_Cide Traumerei the Animation
- Directed by: Yoshikazu Kon
- Produced by: Masahiro Nakayama; Hayato Saga; Yasuki Tabuchi; Yoshiaki Takagaki
- Written by: Hiroshi Ōnogi
- Music by: Kōhei Tanaka
- Studio: Sanzigen
- Licensed by: Crunchyroll: SEA: Plus Media Networks Asia
- Original network: Tokyo MX, BS NTV, SUN, KBS, TVA, HAB, abn, HTB, SBS, TSC, KHB, AT-X, NCC, UX, RKB, TSS
- English network: SEA: Aniplus Asia
- Original run: July 10, 2021 – October 2, 2021
- Episodes: 13

D_Cide Traumerei (stylized as D_CIDE TRAUMEREI) is a Japanese mixed-media project produced by Bushiroad, Sumzap and Drecom. It is a mobile game that was released on September 30, 2021, and ended on October 28, 2022, and an anime television series by Sanzigen which aired from July to October 2021.

== Summary ==
D_Cide Traumerei takes place in a world populated by ancient eldritch-style entities. The entities can "bleed" into reality, altering it and granting power to people who seek a pact with them. Slayers known as "Knocker Ups" have been tasked to defeat these creatures.

=== Plot ===
==== Video Game ====
Teenager Rando Furukata is pulled into another side of reality and gets involved in a horrific and unnatural murder. He and his friends are chosen to be "Knocker Up" after they encounter a monster. Rando and his friends must investigate the strange incident with their teacher and defend the island from the monster in a dream world.

==== Anime ====
Ryuuhei Oda and Rena Mouri accidentally enter the other side of reality and encounter a grotesque creature. They are rescued by Trish, a creature with knowledge of the other side of reality. Trish grants Ryuuhei and Rena power and they are chosen as Knocker Ups to combat the creatures. Ryuuhei and Rena are joined by more experienced slayers, Aruto Fushibe and Jessica Clayborn, as they fight the creatures and learn more about the other side.

== Characters ==
Ryuuhei Oda (織田龍平, Oda Ryūhei)
Voiced by: Yōhei Azakami
Rena Mouri (毛利玲菜, Mōri Reina)
Voiced by: Ayasa Itō
Eri Ibusaki (伊吹咲愛莉, Ibusaki Eri)
Voiced by: Marika Kōno
Aruto Fushibe (伏辺或斗, Fushibe Aruto)
Voiced by: Shun Horie
Jessica Cleiborn (ジェシカ・クレイボーン, Jeshika Kureibōn)
Voiced by: Aoi Yūki
Rando Furukata (古堅蘭堂, Furukata Randō)
Voiced by: Hisayoshi Suganuma
Eru Amami (天海える, Amami Eru)
Voiced by: Kaoru Sakura
Tris (トリス, Torisu)
Voiced by: Haruna Momono
Yoshichika Murase (村瀬良判, Murase Yoshichika)
Voiced by: Yoshitsugu Matsuoka
Junhei Oda (織田純平, Oda Junhei)
Voiced by: Akio Suyama

== Production and release ==
The project was announced on March 16, 2021, with a mobile game released on September 30, 2021, as well as an anime television series, which aired from July 10 to October 2, 2021, on Tokyo MX and other channels. Yoshikazu Kon is directing the series at Sanzigen, with Hiroshi Ōnogi writing the script, BlasTrain designing the characters, and Kohei Tanaka composing the music. The opening song, "The Reasoning of Beasts" (獣の理, Kemono no Kotowari), is performed by Tokyo Jihen. 4-member unit Rondo from D4DJ performs the ending theme titled "Black Lotus." Plus Media Networks Asia has licensed the series in Southeast Asia and released it on Aniplus Asia. Crunchyroll licensed the series outside of Asia.

== Episode list ==
No.	Title	Directed by (Note: Information is taken from the ending credits of each episode.)	Written by	Storyboarded by	Original release date
1	"Awakening"; Transliteration: "Kakusei" (Japanese: 覚醒)	Yūya Yano	Hiroshi Ōnogi	Yoshikazu Kon	July 10, 2021
2	"Cocoon Thread"; Transliteration: "Kenshi" (Japanese: 繭糸)	Naoya Okugawa	Yōsuke Suzuki	Tatsuya Ishiguro	July 17, 2021
3	"Fake Friend!"; Transliteration: "Feiku Furendo" (Japanese: フェイクフレンド)	Daichi Ōmori	Hiroshi Ōnogi	Toshihiko Masuda	July 24, 2021
4	"Rascal"; Transliteration: "Burai" (Japanese: 無頼)	Kentarō Shiga	Hiroshi Ōnogi	Hiroshi Matsuzono	July 31, 2021
5	"My Own Decision"; Transliteration: "Sendan" (Japanese: 擅断)	Yūya Yano	Shigeru Morita	Shigeru Morikawa	August 7, 2021
6	"Kazuha"; Transliteration: "Kazuha" (Japanese: カズハ)	Naoya Okugawa	Shigeru Morita	Takashi Watanabe	August 14, 2021
7	"Island and City"; Transliteration: "Shima to Miyako" (Japanese: 島と都)	Daichi Ōmori	Hiroshi Ōnogi	Kunihisa Sugishima	August 21, 2021
8	"Inside the Box"; Transliteration: "Hako no Naka" (Japanese: 匣の中)	Kentarō Shiga	Hiroshi Ōnogi	Shigeru Morikawa	August 28, 2021
9	"The Man Who Stops Time"; Transliteration: "Toki o Tomeru Otoko" (Japanese: 時を止める男)	Daisuke Suzuki	Shigeru Morita	Jun'ichi Sakata	September 4, 2021
10	"Let Me Dream"; Transliteration: "Yume o Misasete" (Japanese: 夢を見させて)	Yūya Yano	Midori Gotō	Toshihiko Masuda	September 11, 2021
11	"Recollection"; Transliteration: "Tsuisō" (Japanese: 追想)	Naoya Okugawa	Shigeru Morita	Kunihisa Sugishima	September 18, 2021
12	"Staying True to Your Feelings"; Transliteration: "Tsuranuku Omoi" (Japanese: 貫く想い)	Daichi Ōmori	Hiroshi Ōnogi	Toshihiko Masuda	September 25, 2021
13	"The Light of Dawn"; Transliteration: "Gyōkō" (Japanese: 暁光)	Yūya Yano	Hiroshi Ōnogi	Yoshikazu Kon	October 2, 2021
