= Eri Inagawa =

Japanese voice actress and singer

- 稲川 英里
- Born: 28 October 1993 (age 32)
- Occupations: Voice actress; actress
- Years active: 2012–present
- Agent: Freelance
- Notable work: The Idolmaster Million Live! as Tamaki Ogami; Show by Rock!! as Cyan Hijirikawa; The Lost Village as Nyanta; To Your Eternity as Tonari

Eri Inagawa (稲川 英里, Inagawa Eri; born 28 October 1993) is a Japanese actress and voice actress from Yokohama, currently Freelance as of February 18, 2025 and formerly affiliated with Ken Production. She is known for portraying Tamaki Ogami in The Idolmaster Million Live!, Cyan Hijirikawa in Show by Rock!!, Nyanta in The Lost Village, and Tonari in To Your Eternity.

== Biography ==
Eri Inagawa, a native of Yokohama, was born on 28 October 1993. She started working in stage productions as a young child, with her first role being in a production of Annie, and during then she studied classical ballet and jazz dance. While in junior high school, she was part of the student council, soft tennis club, and tea ceremony club, but during then she considered going into voice acting. She ended her retirement from acting and participated in the 2011 Ken Production National Voice Actor Audition, where she won the grand prize.

Inagawa voices Tamaki Ogami in The Idolmaster Million Live!, a spin-off of The Idolmaster franchise. As part of the franchise, she performed as part of the quartet TIntMe! in the 2021 single "The Idolmaster Million Theater Wave 13: TIntMe!" (which charted at #9 in the Oricon Singles Chart). She reprised the role in Million Live's 2023 anime adaptation.

Inagawa voices Cyan Hijirikawa as part of Plasmagica!!, an in-universe singing unit in Sanrio's Show by Rock!! franchise. She voiced the character in the 2013 video game, the 2015 anime adaptation, and the 2020 game Show by Rock!! Fes A Live, and she performed in several of Plasmagica's singles, two of which reached the Top 20 in the Oricon Singles Chart.

In March 2016, Inagawa was cast as Nyanta in The Lost Village. In July 2021, she was cast as Tonari, a character in the Jananda arc of To Your Eternity.

She has an older sister, who has also been an actress.

== Filmography ==
=== Anime television ===
2012

- Gintama, Kanko
- Little Charo: Tōhoku Edition

2014

- Wolf Girl and Black Prince, student
- Yo-kai Watch, Ai-tan

2015

- Aria the Scarlet Ammo AA, Kira
- Insomniacs After School, student
- Show By Rock!!, Cyan Hijirikawa

2016

- The Lost Village, Nyanta
- Yuri on Ice, female A, etc.

2017

- Altair: A Record of Battles, Olympia
- Hozuki's Coolheadedness, female spirit
- Rage of Bahamut: Virgin Soul, dragon child
- Vatican Miracle Examiner, Marco

2018

- Devilman Crybaby, Tarō Makimura
- Fairy Tail, Rita, baby Makarov
- Record of Grancrest War, child
- Yo-kai Watch Shadowside, Misaki

2019

- Sazae-san, Tsuyoshi
- The Rising of the Shield Hero, assistant

2020

- Fushigi Dagashiya Zenitendō, Akari Akimura

2021

- To Your Eternity, Tonari

2022

- Duel Masters Win, Īyan

2023

- The Idolmaster Million Live!, Tamaki Ōgami

=== Video games ===
2012

- Generation of Chaos 6, Marlene
- Wajin Ibunroku: Asaki, Yumemishi, Tōma

2013

- Lightning Returns: Final Fantasy XIII, Riruka, Tabo
- Show by Rock!!, Cyan Hijirikawa
- Soul Sacrifice (video game), player voice
- The Idolmaster Million Live!, Tamaki Ōgami
- Tokimeki Idol, Nanana Katagiri

2014

- Freedom Wars, player voice
- Senjō no Wedingu, Christa-chan
- Tokyo 7th Sisters, Sawori Yamai
- Uchi no Hime-sama ga Ichiban Kawaii, Liselle Berria

2016

- White Cat Project, Elizabeth, Albrecht

2017

- Fire Emblem Echoes: Shadows of Valentia, Mae
- The Idolmaster Million Live! Theater Days, Tamaki Ōgami

2018

- Gyakuten Othellonia, Shippō
- Mist Chronicle, Choco

2019

- World Flipper, Light

2020

- Show by Rock!! Fes A Live, Cyan Hijirikawa

2025

- Mario Kart World, Wiggler

=== Animated films ===
- When Marnie Was There (2014), Nobuko's friend A
- Shimajirō no Wao! Shimajirō to e Hon'no-kuni! (2016), Shirorin with feathers
- Penguin Highway (2018), 6th-grader, etc.
- L'étranger de la Plage (2020), Mio's mother

=== Original net animation ===
- Hikari: Kariya o Tsunagu Monogatari (2016), Shiho

=== Stage performances ===
- Shishunki Bitter Change (2019), Yui Ōtsuka
