= Japanese superstitions =

Japanese superstitions are rooted in the culture and history of Japan and the Japanese people. Some Japanese superstitions are meant to teach lessons or serve as practical advice.

== Overview ==
Some superstitions that are common in Japan have been imported from other cultures. The Japanese share superstitions with other Asian cultures, particularly the Chinese, with whom they share significant historical and cultural ties. The unluckiness of the number four is one such example, as the Japanese word for "four" 四 romaji: shi is a homophone for "death" kanji: 死. The same is true for Chinese, hanzi: 死 pinyin: sǐ, is also homophonous to "death." However, unlike most other countries, in Japan, a black cat crossing one's path is considered to bring good luck.

A significant portion of Japanese superstition is related to language. Numbers and objects that have names that are homophones (Dōongo / Dōon Igigo (同音語 / 同音異義語), lit. "Like-Sound Utterance" / "Like-Sound Different-Meaning Utterance") for words such as "death" and "suffering" are typically considered unlucky (see also, Imikotoba). Other superstitions relate to the literal meanings of words. Another significant part of Japanese superstition has its roots in Japan's ancient pagan, animist culture and regards certain natural things as having kami. Thus, many Japanese superstitions involve beliefs about animals and depictions of animals bringing about good or bad fortune.

Japanese folk-belief literature includes extensive collections organized by subject and locality. Tōzō Suzuki's Nihon Zokushin Jiten: Dōbutsu-hen, for example, records approximately 2,800 traditions concerning animals, marine life, and insects from across Japan, with entries arranged by subject and the places where individual beliefs were reported. Such collections also demonstrate the regional character of Japanese folk belief, since similar animals or events can acquire different meanings in different parts of the country.

== Folk wisdom ==
- Resting just after eating results in becoming a cow/pig/elephant. (This discourages laziness.)
- If whistling or playing a flute at night, snakes will come out. (This means not to bother the neighbors.) In this context, "snake" means a thief.
- The first dream of a Japanese New Year will come true (hatsuyume).
- Breaking a comb or the cloth strap of a geta wooden sandal is an omen of misfortune.

=== Numbers ===
==== Lucky numbers ====
- 7 is an important number in Buddhism, and is also considered lucky.
- 8 is considered a lucky number due to its shape.

==== Unlucky numbers ====
There are six unlucky numbers in Japanese. Traditionally, 4 is unlucky because it is sometimes pronounced shi, which is the word for death. Sometimes levels or rooms with 4 do not exist in hospitals or hotels. Particularly in the maternity section of a hospital, the room number 43 is avoided because it can literally mean "stillbirth". (死産 - shizan: 死 - death/to die and 産 - childbirth/produce). In cars and racing, number 42 which sounds like shini (死に – "to die") and 49, which sounds like shiku (死苦 - "a painful death") are avoided. When giving gifts such as plates, they are normally in sets of three or five, never four.

Number 9 is sometimes pronounced ku — with the same pronunciation as agony or torture. Combs (kushi) are rarely given as presents as the name is pronounced the same as 94.

Due to these unlucky connotations, the numbers 4 and 9 are often pronounced yon and kyuu instead.

The number 13 is occasionally thought of as unlucky, although this superstition is a recent import from Western culture.

== Death and the supernatural ==
- After a Japanese funeral, the mourners perform a cleansing ritual by throwing salt over themselves or scattering it on walkways leading to the front door.
- If a hearse drives past, One should hide their thumbs by closing their fingers around them, forming a fist. The Japanese word for thumb, oyayubi (親指) literally translates as 'parent-finger', and it is believed that hiding the thumb serves as protection for one's parents from misfortune.
- Sleeping with one's head pointing to the north results in a short life. (This is the way a body is laid out at funeral.)
- Chopsticks should not be stuck upright into food, especially rice. Chopsticks are only stuck upright into rice in the bowl on the altar at a funeral or when paying respects to the deceased. This is called hotokebashi.
- When sharing food, items should never be passed from chopstick-to-chopstick, as this is done only in a ceremony where bone fragments from cremated remains are placed in an urn.
- Cutting fingernails or toenails at night is bad luck. If one does so, it is believed that they will not be with their parents at their deathbed.
- A person's name should not be written in red ink. (This is due to names on grave markers being red.)

== Animals ==
- Use of the Maneki Neko or "lucky cat". Many businesses such as shops or restaurants have figures of such beckoning cats, which are considered to be lucky and to bring in money and fortune.
- A spider seen in the morning means good luck so the spider should not be killed. If a spider is seen at night means bad luck so it should be killed.
- A crow's caw means something bad will happen. This can be anything from illness or accidents to death or natural disasters.
- The green pheasant is said to be able to sense when an earthquake is about to hit, and will 'scream' (crow) shortly before an earthquake occurs.

== See also ==
- Dajare
- Fire Horse
- Japanese Buddhism
- Japanese mythology
- List of haunted locations in Japan
- Sailors' superstitions
- Shinto
