= Dad joke =

Type of short joke

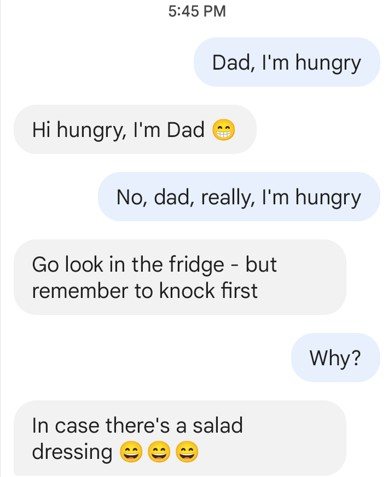
- Dad jokes sent via text message
- Type of joke: Pun
- Language: English

A dad joke is a joke typically involving a pun, often presented as a one-liner or a question and answer. Generally inoffensive, dad jokes are told with sincere humorous intent or to elicit a negative "groaning" reaction to their overly simplistic humor. Dad jokes are so-called because they are stereotypically thought to be those a father figure would tell to a child.

Dad jokes have been published under that name at least as early as 1987, and in 2017, #dadjokes became one of the most popular hashtags on Twitter. The phrase was added to the Merriam-Webster dictionary in 2019, and several major magazines have published compilations, such as Today's list of 330 "corny one-liners, dumb puns and groan-worthy dad jokes" in October 2025.

== Origin ==
While not so-named, the genre was extant in late antiquity. In Philogelos, a father asks his son, "Should I call you my hope or my salvation, Pseudolus?" Upon hearing the reply, "Both!", another father greets Pseudolus by saying, "Hi, Both!"

As we approach Father's Day, I would propose that "Dad" Jokes not be banned. They should be revered, preserved.

— Jim Kalbaugh, The Gettysburg Times columnist in 1987

While the exact origin of the term dad joke is unknown, the term was first published by Jim Kalbaugh, who wrote an impassioned defense of the genre in The Gettysburg Times in June 1987 under the headline "Don't ban the 'Dad' jokes; preserve and revere them".

The term dad jokes received mentions in the American sitcom How I Met Your Mother in 2008 and the Australian quiz show Spicks and Specks in 2009.

According to The Conversation, dad joke compilation books were first published in 2013 in the UK and in 2016 in the U.S.

== Typeology ==
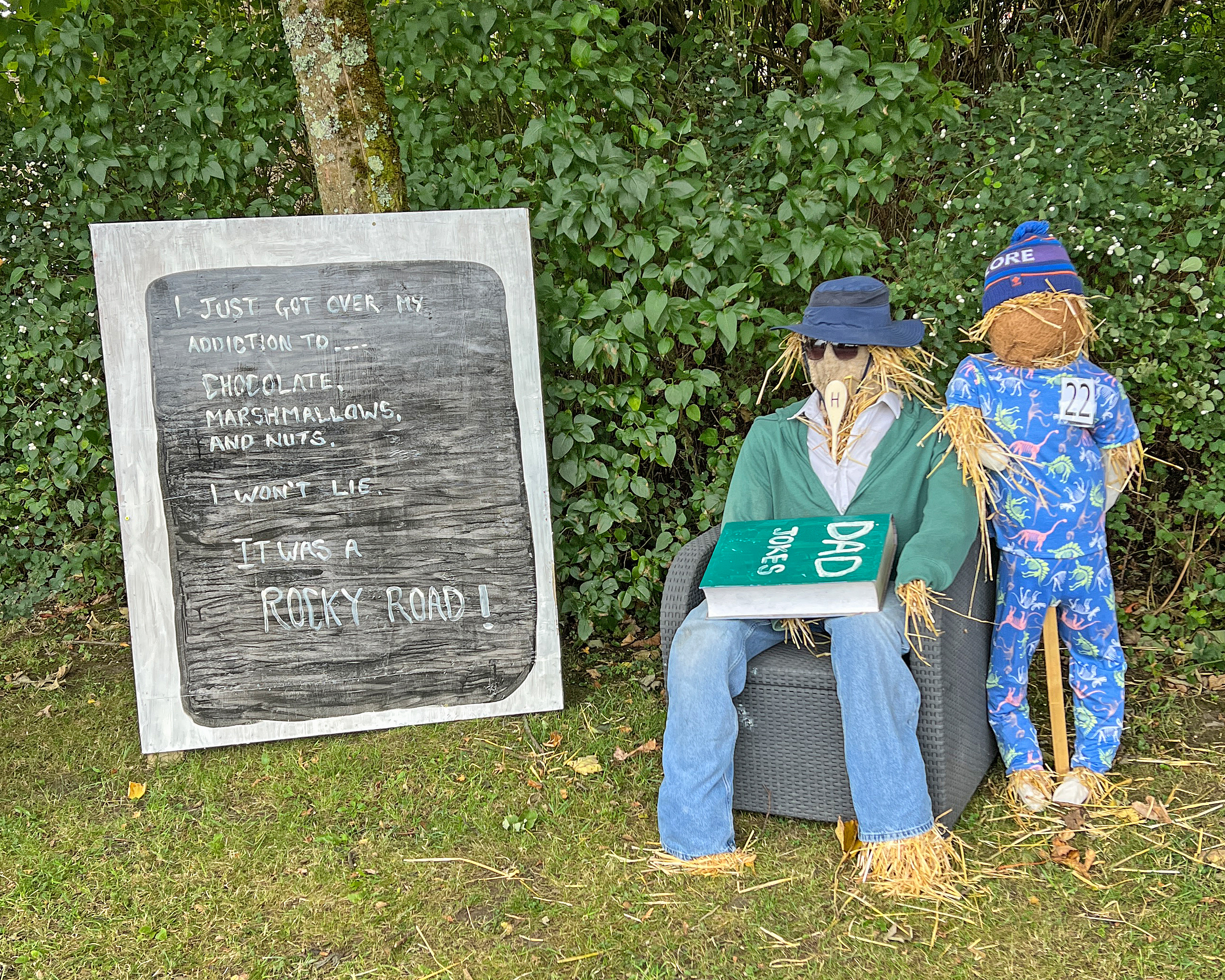
A "Dad Joke" display at the 2024 Norland Scarecrow Festival: "I just got over my addiction to chocolate, marshmallows and nuts. I won't lie, it was a rocky road."

Dad jokes lack a uniform structure like knock-knock jokes or lightbulb jokes, and do not center on parenting or specific topics, nor are they profane or political. They are inoffensive and "safe", but are "generally bad, lame, [and] groan-inducing".

They are often delivered in one-liner or short monologue form, such as "I don't trust stairs. They're always up to something" and "Lance isn't that common a name these days, but in medieval times, they were called Lance-a-lot".

Some dad jokes are anti-jokes, deriving humor from a punchline that is intentionally not funny, such as non sequiturs like: "Q: Why did the plane crash into the mountain? A: Because the pilot was a loaf of bread."

Others are ripostes: when a child tells his father, "I'm hungry," a dad-joker replies with, "Hi, Hungry, I'm Dad." According to a 2023 survey of 1,500 American fathers and their partners, the "Hi, Hungry, I'm Dad" gag was the most heard of the genre in nine U.S. states and was the most common nationwide.

In June 2024, two folklore professors wrote in The Conversation that dad jokes should regarded more of a performance than a joke, as they involve the teller (dad) and the audience (children, children's friends, spouse, and anyone within earshot). Intentionally breaking the taboo against telling a bad joke, the dad wins whether his hearers laugh at the joke or his children groan embarrassingly at their father's lameness. "Dad jokes are comfortable jokes for comfortable situations among friends and family ... They represent a dad at his most annoying, but also at his best: warm, silly and loving."

== Popularity ==
The genre began to thrive on social media platforms; in 2017, #dadjokes was one of the most popular hashtags on Twitter. The U.S. Administration for Children and Families and the Ad Council launched the #dadjokesrule campaign in August 2017 to use the increasing popularity of the humor form to encourage positive father-child communication. Ad Council president and chief executive officer Lisa Sherman said, "Dad jokes represent more than just a trend; these jokes are smiles, moments, and memories made with one of the most important people in a child's life."

In September 2019, Merriam-Webster added the phrase "dad joke" to the dictionary.

Of the U.S. states, Pennsylvania and Delaware reported the highest frequency of dad jokes in 2023.

== Examples in notable publications ==
Men's Health, in October 2021, compiled two hundred of "the best dad jokes of all time", sorting them into topical categories of punny, "groaners", sick, parenting, and "my wife". Respective to category, they included "I only seem to get sick on weekdays. I must have a weekend immune system."; "I use to hate facial hair, but then it grew on me."; "What's worse than biting into an apple and finding a worm? Biting into an apple and finding half a worm."; "When does a joke become a dad joke? When it becomes apparent."; and "I think my wife is putting glue on my antique gun collection. She denies it, but I'm sticking to my guns."

In April 2025, Country Living compiled 300 gags including "all-new dad jokes for 2025", such as "Dogs can't operate MRI machines, but catscan".

Good Housekeeping published a May 2025 list of 315 dad jokes, calling their conveyance "a true art form". The compilation included: "In 2025, I didn't do a marathon. I didn't do one in 2024, 2023 or 2022, either. This is a running joke", "I started a band called 999 Megabytes — we haven't gotten a gig yet", and "I love telling Dad jokes. Sometimes, he even laughs."

In October 2025, Today updated its May 2022 compilation of 225 examples of the humor genre (categorizing some as being better suited for adults than for children) to include 330 "corny one-liners, dumb puns and groan-worthy dad jokes".

== See also ==
- Dajare
- "Yo mama" joke
