= List of reportedly haunted locations in Japan =

This is a list of reportedly haunted locations in Japan.

== Tokyo ==
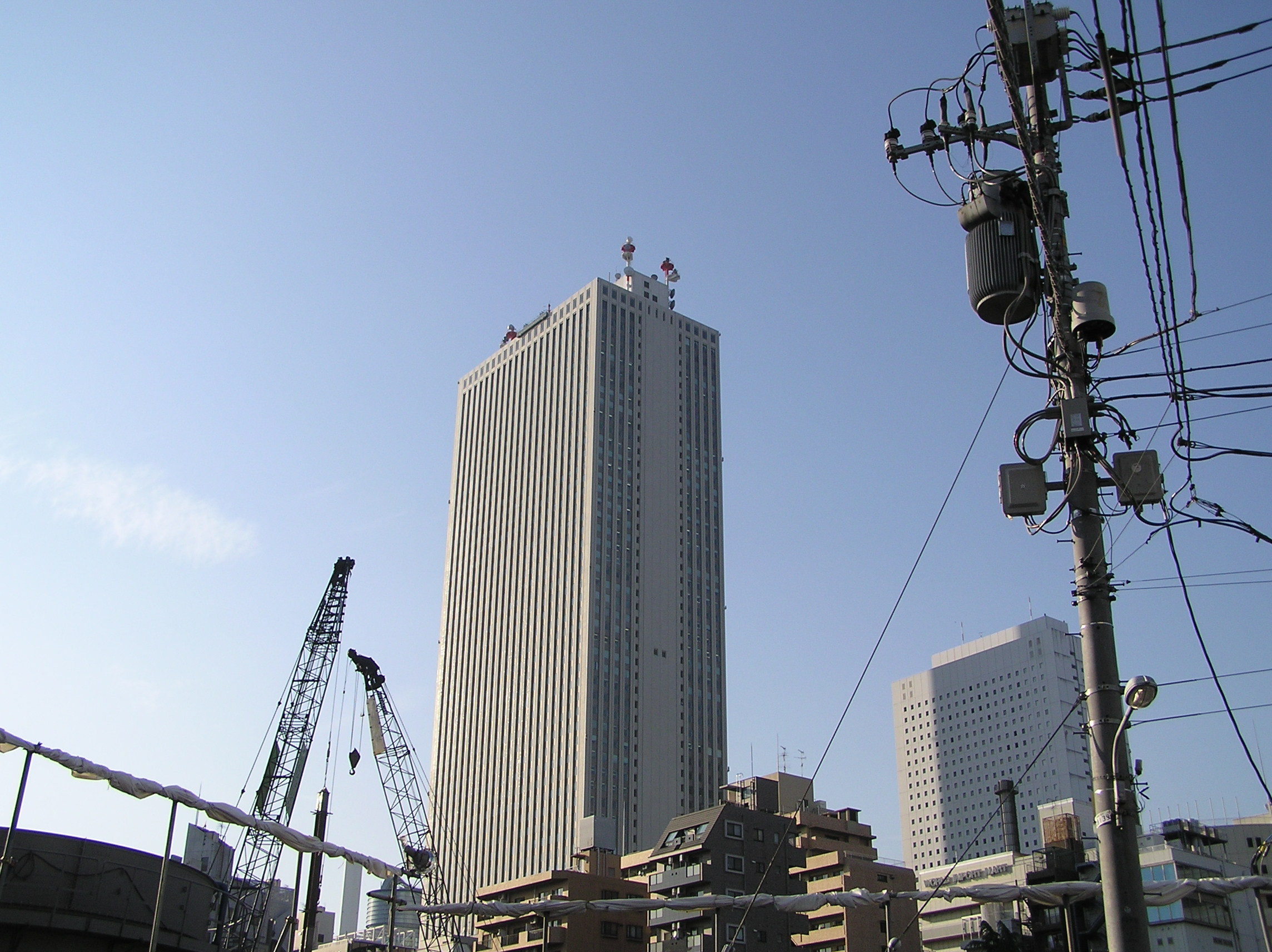
Sunshine 60 in 2004

Sunshine 60
Built on the site of the former Sugamo Prison, where seven Japanese war criminals (including former Prime Minister Hideki Tojo) were hanged in 1948. Soviet spy Richard Sorge was also hanged in the prison in 1944. Since the prison's dismantlement and Sunshine 60's completion, there have been claims of supernatural sightings in and around the building.

Masakado's grave
Purportedly the resting place of Taira no Masakado, a rebellious Heian period warlord. There have been cases where construction workers disturbing the grave had accidents, with some dying as a result.

Oiwa Shrine
Believed to be the former home of a woman who was murdered by her husband.

Hachiōji Castle
An abandoned castle site. Visitors to the ruins claim to hear the screams of women.

Prudential Tower
In 1982, a fire in the building killed 33 people, making people believe it to be haunted.

Akasaka Mansion hotel
A woman claimed she was dragged across her room by an unseen force.

Doryodo Ruins
Two bodies were allegedly found on the site, a body of an elderly woman in 1963 and a young college student in 1973. The temple was demolished in 1985. Visitors have claimed to hear the screams of the two murder victims.

Naikaku Sōri Daijin Kantei
The official residence of the Prime Minister of Japan, it opened in 1929 and is claimed to be haunted by ghosts from the May 15 incident in 1932, in which prime minister Inukai Tsuyoshi was assassinated as part of a coup d'etat, and the February 26 incident in 1936, in which six people were killed in an attack by soldiers seeking to assassinate prime minister Keisuke Okada. In a 1996 memoir, the wife of prime minister Tsutomu Hata wrote that she had seen spirits in old military uniforms in the residence's garden.

Hanayashiki
An amusement park in the Asakusa area has a haunted house that has been around for over 40 years. It is not just an ordinary haunted house in a theme park. Locals say it is truly haunted.

Toshimaen
A former amusement park in the Nerima area, there was a haunted house where, in 2017, a female actress went inside and screamed, saying a mysterious hand had touched her. Footage later showed the hand clearly.

== Kyoto ==
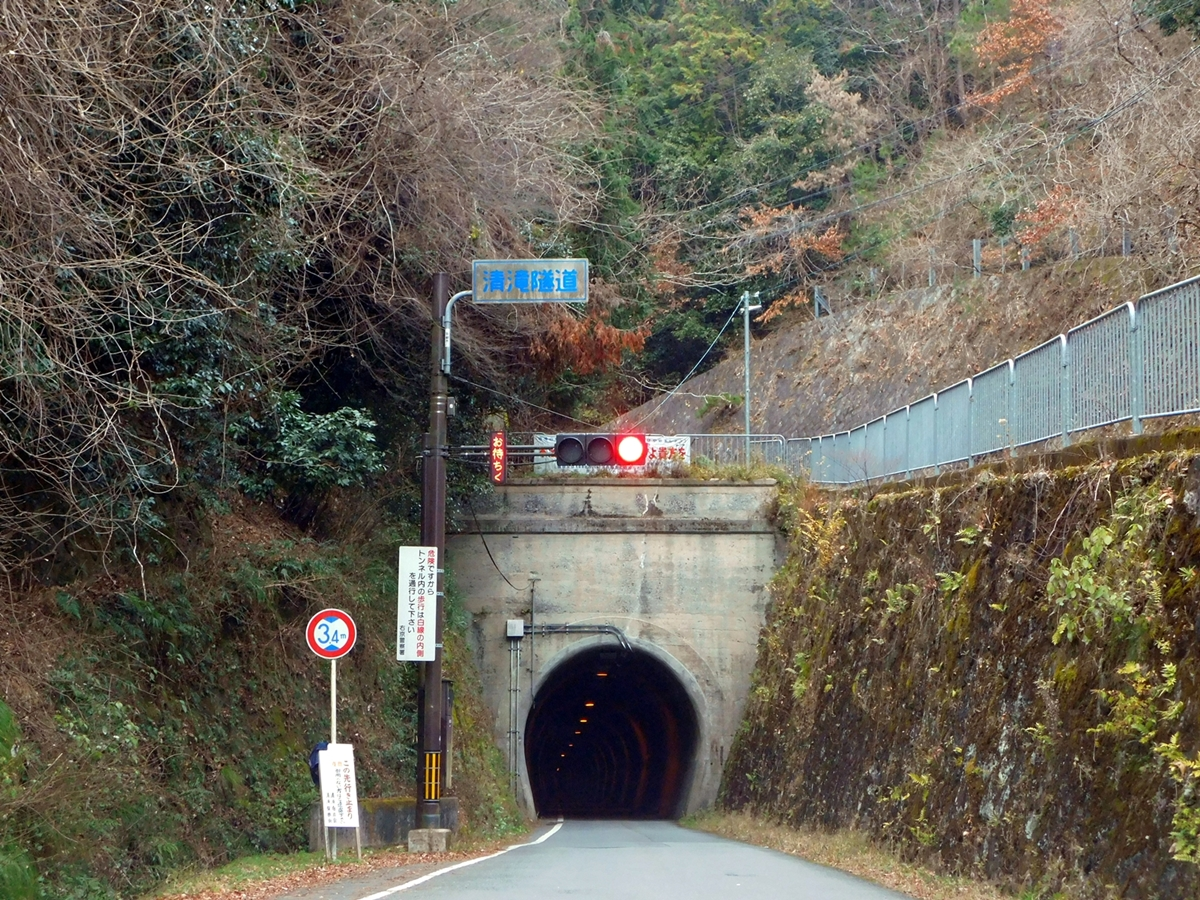
Kiyotaki Tunnel

Kiyotaki Tunnel
One of the most famous haunted locations in Kyoto.

Midoro Pond
A spirit of a young girl is believed to haunt the pond.

== Yamanashi ==
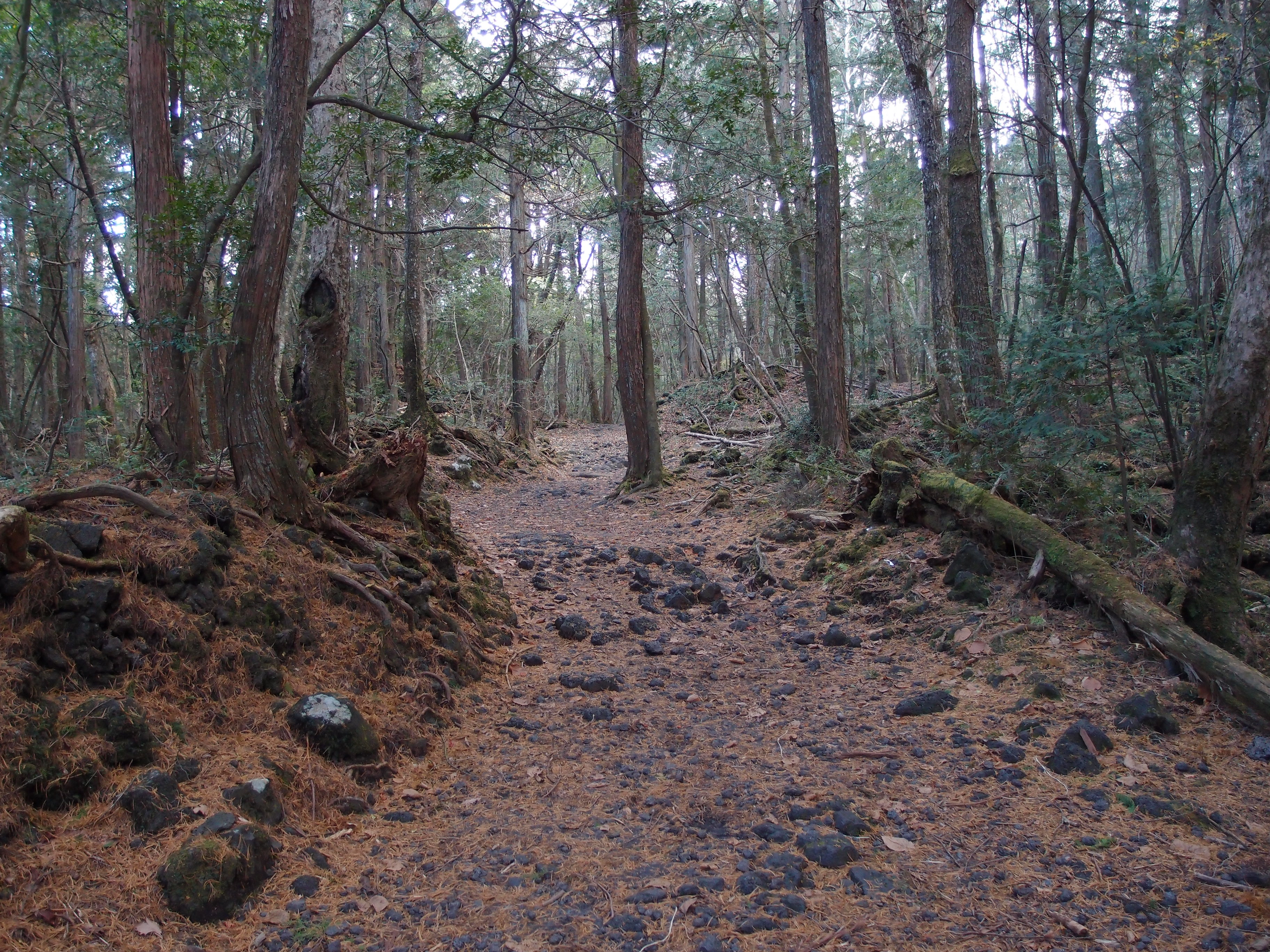
Aokigahara Forest

Aokigahara
One of the most popular suicide sites in Japan, reputed to be haunted by the yūrei of those died there.

Oiran Buchi
According to a legend during the Warring States period, there was a gold mine in the area. The 55 prostitutes working there were killed to prevent them from sharing information about the gold.

== Other ==
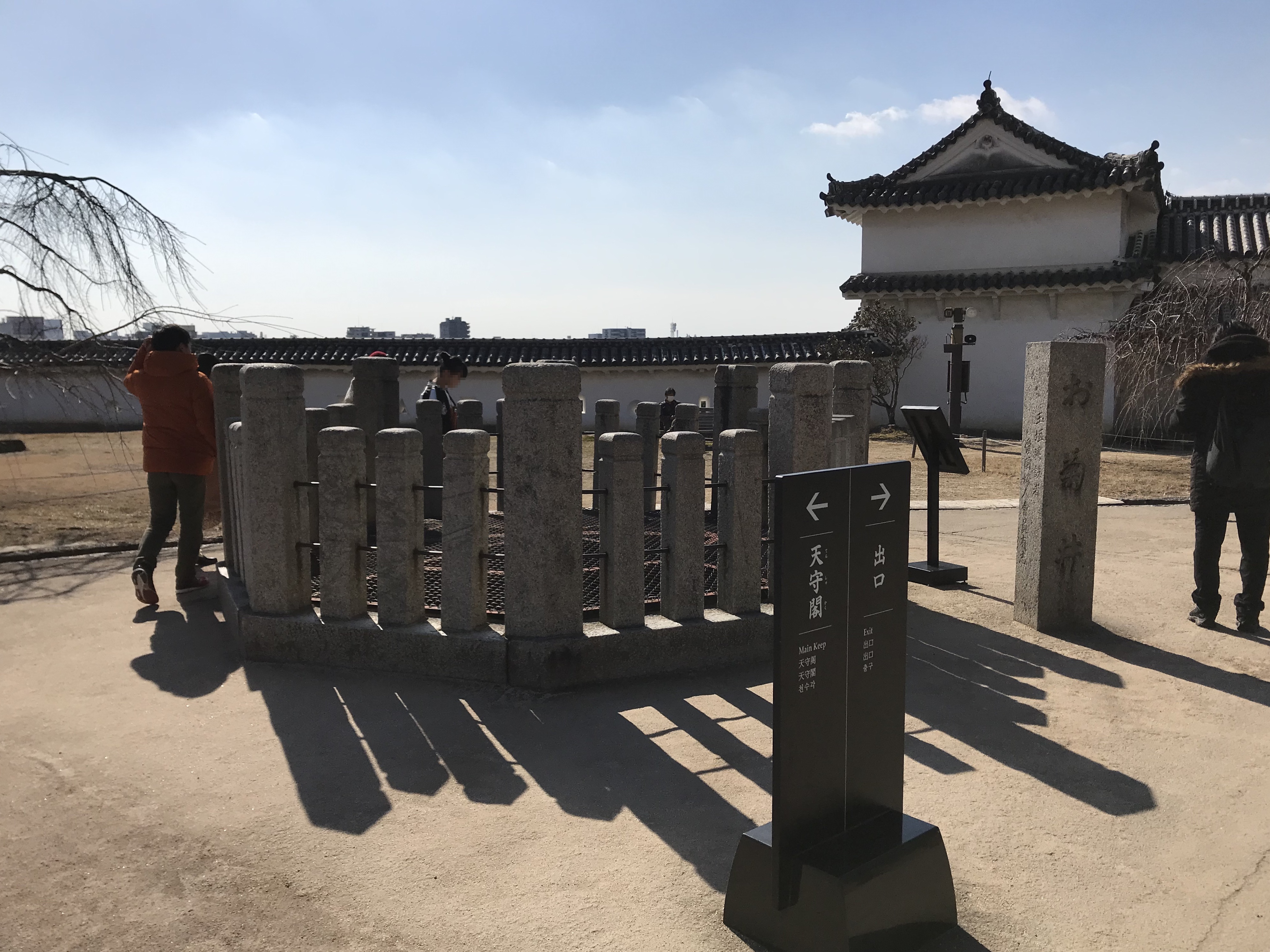
Okiku Well in Himeji Castle

Himeji Castle
Believed to be haunted by Banchō Sarayashiki.

Mount Osore
Believed to be a gateway to the underworld.

Gridley Tunnel
Located on a naval base in Yokosuka, Japan. Between midnight and 1:00 am on rainy nights, a samurai appears to solo explorers.

Maruoka Castle
According to legend, in 1576, a widow named Oshizu agreed to become hitobashira if her son became samurai for the lord. However, the lord was later transferred, and the promise was broken, so Oshizu flooded the castle’s moat every April.

Ryokufuso Inn
Allegedly home to a zashiki-warashi. Some guests have claimed they were touched by invisible fingers as they slept. Others have claimed to have seen ghostly white balls floating in the air.

== See also ==
- Japanese mythology
- List of haunted locations
- Japanese superstitions
- Kimodameshi
- Japanese urban legend
- Hyakumonogatari Kaidankai
- Japanese haunted towns
