= Show by Rock!! =

Japanese rhythm game and its franchise

- Cover of the sixth Blu-ray volume, showing the main cast
- Created by: Sanrio
- Video game
- Developer: Geechs (2013–2017); Edia (2018–2019)
- Publisher: Geechs (2013–2017); Edia (2018–2019)
- Genre: Rhythm
- Platform: iOS; Android
- Released: July 30, 2013 (iOS); June 27, 2014 (Android)
- Anime television series
- Directed by: Takahiro Ikezoe
- Written by: Touko Machida
- Music by: Yasuharu Takanashi; Funta7; Rega Sound
- Studio: Bones
- Licensed by: Crunchyroll: SEA: Medialink
- Original network: Tokyo MX, ytv, BS11
- English network: HK: ViuTV; US: Crunchyroll Channel
- Original run: April 5, 2015 – June 21, 2015
- Episodes: 12
- Anime television series

Show by Rock!! Short!!
- Directed by: Takahiro Ikezoe
- Written by: Touko Machida
- Music by: Yasuharu Takanashi; Funta7
- Studio: Bones
- Licensed by: Crunchyroll: SEA: Medialink
- Original network: Tokyo MX, ytv
- Original run: July 4, 2016 – September 19, 2016
- Episodes: 12
- Anime television series

Show by Rock!!#
- Directed by: Takahiro Ikezoe
- Written by: Touko Machida
- Music by: Yasuharu Takanashi; Funta7; Rega Sound
- Studio: Bones
- Licensed by: Crunchyroll: SEA: Medialink
- Original network: Tokyo MX, TVA, ytv, BS11
- English network: HK: ViuTV
- Original run: October 2, 2016 – December 18, 2016
- Episodes: 12
- Anime television series

Show by Rock!! Mashumairesh!!
- Directed by: Seung Hui Son
- Written by: Daisuke Tazawa
- Music by: Yasuharu Takanashi; Funta7
- Studio: Kinema Citrus
- Licensed by: Crunchyroll
- Original network: Tokyo MX, BS Fuji, UHB, SUN, TV Tokyo
- Original run: January 9, 2020 – March 26, 2020
- Episodes: 12
- Video game

Show by Rock!! Fes A Live
- Developer: Now Production (2020-2022)
- Publisher: Square Enix
- Genre: Rhythm
- Platform: iOS; Android
- Released: March 12, 2020
- Manga
- Written by: Takemaru Yokoshima
- Published by: Kadokawa Shoten
- Magazine: Young Ace
- Original run: July 4, 2020 – May 4, 2022
- Volumes: 1
- Anime television series

Show by Rock!! Stars!!
- Directed by: Takahiro Ikezoe (chief); Daigo Yamagishi
- Written by: Touko Machida
- Music by: Yasuharu Takanashi; Funta7; Akiya Suzuki
- Studio: Kinema Citrus
- Licensed by: Crunchyroll
- Original network: Tokyo MX, BS Fuji, SUN, UHB
- Original run: January 7, 2021 – March 25, 2021
- Episodes: 12

Show by Rock!! (stylized in all caps; also known as Show by Rock!! Gonna be a Music Millionaire!) was a Japanese mobile rhythm video game developed and published by Geechs (later Edia), in conjunction with Sanrio. It was Sanrio's first-ever franchise project aimed for the older demographic and the company's first music-based franchise. The game was released on July 30, 2013 for iOS and on June 27, 2014 for Android devices. In January 2018, development transferred from Geechs to Edia with its service discontinued on December 26, 2019. A successor to the original game was later developed by Now Production and published by Square Enix on March 12, 2020 on all mobile platforms with its service discontinued on November 30, 2022.

Four anime adaptations based on the series were made. The first three animated by Bones and is the first late night anime based on a Sanrio character or franchise. Season 1 aired in Japan between April and June 2015 on Tokyo MX, a short anime aired from July to September 2016 and a second season aired from October to December 2016. The third season of the series was animated by Kinema Citrus and aired from January to March 2020. A fourth season aired from January to March 2021. A manga adaptation of the first series began serialization in Kadokawa Shoten's Young Ace magazine in July 2020.

== Gameplay ==
=== Show by Rock!! ===
Show by Rock!! was a mobile game, combining elements from both rhythm games and raising sim games. Players could choose from 27 different bands, each having their own music style and uses special cards for each gameplay. The player's team could have up to five cards, and choose one support player from a list. The player had a certain amount of "soul" for each element depending on their cards. The player could play whichever song they would like from the band of their choice, as well as the level that worked with their team. Occasionally, a band's members' Melodisian Stones may turn dark, and thus a boss battle appears. For the boss battles, you may only choose a song from the band whose Melodsian Stones turned dark, and the goal for each boss battle is to survive until the end. Players also got to create their own character at the start of the game, and design their own room.

=== Fes A Live ===
Gameplay for Fes A Live was similar to that to the original series that preceded it, but presented it in a landscape format similar to The Idolmaster and BanG Dream!. Unlike the previous game, the game only had a limited amount of bands presented but each are assigned to their musical alignment: Melody, Harmony and Rhythm instead of the traditional elemental attributes of the previous game. Gameplay for the live section mode had the same elements from the original and inherits newer twists such as swipeable notes, the ability to adjust scrolling speed and a more traditional 5-note layout.

A new feature of the game was the town of GURF, which served as a main hub for the player. Players had to customize with specific buildings in order to gain sound dollars, the game's free currency. These could also be earned by obtaining items after each play session specific to each band, which could be sold to the shop and also could level up each band. As the player leveled up, newer slots in the town were added in order to add more buildings. Also, players could also upgrade buildings by buying them through the in-game store using sound dollars as well. The game also had a boss battle mode, which could be accessed through by finding a corrupted myummon in town and defeating it could earn players with more currency. The game's bromide system also returned, allowing players to obtain bromide cards through gacha using Melodisian Stones and each card could be evolved if certain levels are reached, each having various rarity. In addition to a story mode, the game also had a 69 Memorial Mode, which allowed players to read the storyline of the original anime series for new players of the game.

== Plot ==
=== Show by Rock!! ===
Cyan Hijirikawa is a first-year high school student who has a good passion for music. However, she is very shy and doesn't have the courage to join the school's music club. But on one fateful night, she gets sucked into the rhythm game she had been playing on her smartphone after receiving an item called "Strawberry Heart". Cyan ends up in a new world called Midi City, a place where those who command music control everything. There, she sees a concert performed by a kemono band called Trichronika and realizes she had taken on the form of a white kemono cat girl, dressed in a costume resembling Gothic Lolita fashion. However, when a "dark monster" starts to attack the concert and begins to corrupt the Melodisian stones of the Trichronika members, Strawberry Heart materializes in Cyan's hands and tells her to play something with it to defeat the monster. As she saves the band from turning into dark monsters themselves, she returns to her human form, but retaining her cat ears and tail. She is then approached by Maple Arisugawa, the CEO of Banded Rocking Records to join his recording agency. She meets ChuChu, Retoree, and Moa, the guitarist, bassist, and drummer of Plasmagica, one of Banded Rocking Record's bands. Retoree asks Cyan to join, and she accepts. Together, they all tackle and perform together in the music scene, aiming to be the best music band of all Midi City, discovering the secrets surrounding the Dark Monsters and importantly for Cyan, to find a way to get back to her own world.

=== Show by Rock!!# ===
Set after the events of the first season, the intergalactic fleet led by the malevolent Queen of Darkness, Victorious, unleashed a devastating attack on Sound Planet in the future, causing total destruction of Midi City. Upon its destruction, a mysterious band named Bud Virgin Logic appeared and performed a malevolent tune to the surviving denizens while Dagger Morse corrupts all the citizens, draining them of their sound energy and plunging the city into chaos and despair. From the attack, only Ninjinriot survived and feared the worst scenario that would lead to the fall of the Sound Universe. With no choice, the band traveled back in time to prevent it from happening. In present-day Midi City, Maple told the members of Plasmagica, ShinganCrimsonZ, and Criticrista that their recording label is holding a beneficiary concert to the people with somewhat positive reactions. Though at the time of the concert, Plasmagica, despite not having Cyan is eager to perform, until Bud Virgin Logic appeared alongside Dagger Morse, who announced he will destroy the ones who defeated them. But they were thwarted by Ninjinriot, who rescued the trio. After Dagger and his band retreated, Arashi told them that bad things will happen if they don't stop Dagger and Bud Virgin Logic, resulting in the said bad future and got everyone worried that there will be a new battle. At the same time in the Human World, Cyan Hijirikawa was stuck in a writer's block regarding composing a song for her band in the upcoming school festival. Kamui arrived at the Human World and transported Cyan back to the Sound World in order to prevent the dark future from happening. With the entire world in a knife's edge, it's up to Cyan and her friends once again to stop Dagger and Victorious from destroying the Sound Universe.

=== Show by Rock!! Mashumairesh!! ===
Taking place somewhere after the second season, the story focuses on Howan, a Fox Myummon who lives in the countryside on Sound Planet. Though she enjoys her peaceful life in the countryside, Howan dreams of music stardom and gets the chance to achieve her dream when she passes the audition for a music competition in Midi City. Meanwhile, the guitarist Mashima Himeko is equally passionate about music but feels uncomfortable having been placed in a band with two other young artists, the bassist Delmin and the drummer Ruhuyu. Howan loses her audition pass, making her unable to join the audition. Under the glittering lights of Midi City, when Howan is distraught at losing her audition pass, Howan, Himeko, Delmin and Ruhuyu meet each other for the first time and discover together with what they could never reach alone.

=== Show by Rock!! Stars!! ===
Takin place after the third season, bands from previous seasons, including Plasmagica, Criticrista, Mashumairesh!! and Dokonjofinger return to Midi City. The story features an all-star battle of the bands involving performers from across the franchise.

== Characters ==
=== Main bands ===
Plasmagica (プラズマジカ, Purazumajika)
The starter band in the video game's story mode, composed of four members gathered by Maple Arisugawa of Banded Rocking Records. Cyan hopes for her band to be the best, and they aim for the top of the Music Industry. They are also the featured group in the Show By Rock!! anime.
- Cyan Hijirikawa (聖川 詩杏, Hijirikawa Shian) / Cyan (シアン, Shian) (Voiced by: Eri Inagawa (Japanese); Bryn Apprill (English)) – guitar and vocals – The series' protagonist, Cyan is a first-year high school student who is good at music, but is too shy to join her school's music club. When she got sucked into the Sound World, she became a white cat girl Myumon who wears a Gothic Lolita outfit with striped stockings. She dreamed of becoming the best music star in the world until she became involved in the fight against the Dark Monsters, then was scouted by Maple to be part of the band. When performing, she uses the guitar named Strawberry Heart, which is used as a way to communicate with musician Grateful King. In human form, she has black hair, cat ears, and a long cat tail.
- Chuchu (チュチュ, Chuchu) (Voiced by: Sumire Uesaka (Japanese); Alexis Tipton (English)) – guitar and vocals – a purple rabbit girl who dresses in black clothing. An honor student of a school she attended, she is rather strictly mannered but sociable. However, she can be prideful in certain situations and formed the band in order to boost her popularity for her to start her solo career. Eventually, she decided not to leave due to how important they are to her. She wields the Antique Batman guitar, which is her prized instrument. In human form, she has purple hair and white rabbit ears and tail.
- Retoree (レトリー, Retorī) (Voiced by: Eri Kitamura (game, ONA), Manami Numakura (anime, 2018 game update, Fes A Live!) (Japanese); Caitlin Glass (English)) – bass and vocals – a Golden Retriever dog girl who has long blonde ears and ribbons in her hair. She is the smart girl of the group and uses her smartphone frequently, making her shy and unsociable. She uses the Blue Station Electric Bass as her main instrument. In her human form, she has long blonde hair tied in twin-tails and a yellow tail. She appears to have a crush on Cyan.
- Moa (モア, Moa) (Voiced by: Ayane Sakura (Japanese); Monica Rial (English)) – drums and vocals – a pink and black Pyuruian sheep girl with yellow horns, described as an alien who came from the Planet Pyuru. She came to the Sound Planet to research the planet for a new energy source until she is scouted to join the band. She always ends her sentences with "Pyuru~" (ぴゅる〜, Pyuru〜) and plays with the band using the Super Cosmo drums. In her human form, she has pink curly hair, yellow horns, black ears and a short black tail. She is later revealed to be the Crown Princess of Planet Pyuru.

Shingancrimsonz (シンガンクリムゾンズ, Shingankurimuzonzu)
The second main band of the game, classified as a visual kei band. Like Plasmagica, they are also contracted to Banded Rocking Records and also aim to become the best in Midi City.
- Crow (クロウ, Kurō) (Voiced by: Kishō Taniyama (Japanese); Mike McFarland (English)) – guitar and vocals - The leader of Shingan Crimsonz, he is a hedgehog Myumon who aims to be the best rocker in Midi City. Shown to be impulsive and vulgar, he usually boasts his skills in music and tends to disagree with Aion and Yaiba. Being from a family of dairy farmers, he calls his fans “cattle” which they find insulting. However, he is very skilled in music and wields the ax-shaped Red Tomahawk guitar.
- Aion (アイオーン, Aiōn) (Voiced by: Junichi Yanagita (game), Kōki Uchiyama (anime) (Japanese); Jerry Jewell (English)) – guitar - A lion Myumon who is calm yet thinks highly of himself. Usually gets into fights with Crow and Yaiba, he wields the Holy Arc guitar. He is Ailane's older brother.
- Yaiba (ヤイバ, Yaiba) (Voiced by: Mitsuhiro Ichiki (game), Tetsuya Kakihara (anime) (Japanese); Ian Sinclair (English)) – bass - A fox Myumon who follows the way of the samurai, Yaiba is a guy who has great respect towards the way of the Bushido and the Rock Spirit. He is very timid and often gets into fights with both Crow and Aion. He wields the "Ryūkenden (龍剣伝)" guitar.
- Rom (ロム, Romu) (Voiced by: Teruyuki Tanzawa (game), Yoshimasa Hosoya (anime) (Japanese); Christopher R. Sabat (English)) – drums - A leopard Myumon and the de facto leader of the group. Despite having a hot personality and looking tough, he is level headed and usually scolds the other three when they're arguing. He plays the Skull Jacker drums and is the only member of the group who has a full-time job. He was once friends with Shu☆Zo when he was a member of their previous band Amatelast, until they broke up.

Tsurezurenaru Ayatsuri Mugenan (徒然なる操り霧幻庵)
Tsurezurenaru Ayatsuri Mugenan is the game's Enka band, which plays a fusion of both rock and traditional Japanese music. They came to Midi City to spread Far East music. The songs in the game were all performed by Salia of the band Unicorn Table until "Sadame" which was performed by Saori Hayami in Japanese and Dawn M. Bennett in English.
- A (阿) (Voiced by: Saori Hayami (Japanese); Dawn M. Bennett (English)) – guitar shamisen and vocals - A tan Shiba Inu Myumon who wears a bamboo hat over her head.
- Un (吽) (Voiced by: Eriko Matsui (Japanese); Jad Saxton (English)) – bass shamisen and vocals - She is a grey mouse Myumon who wears a brown hat.
- Daru Dayu (ダル太夫, Daru Dayū) (Voiced by: Megumi Han (Japanese); Stephanie Young (English)) – drums and vocal - A cat Myumon and leader of the band. She is seen with a red daruma figure with cat ears that serves as the band's drummer.

Trichronika (トライクロニカ, Toraikuronika)
Trichronika is an all-male idol group and the first band Cyan met in the anime. It is composed of three members, signed to the major idol label Judas.
- Shu☆Zo (シュウ☆ゾー, Shū Zō) (Voiced by: Kasuya Daisuke (game), Mamoru Miyano (anime) (Japanese); Vic Mignogna (2015-2016), Zeno Robinson (2020-2021) (English)) – guitar and vocals - A Myumon of unconfirmed species and the leader of Trichronika, he is considered a galactic prince with a sweet angelic voice. He is very popular with fans in Midi City, especially for his music skills. He is able to sing, play guitar, and play the piano perfectly. However, he shares a dark past with one of the members of Shingancrimsonz, Rom, with whom he was in a visual kei band named Amatelast before they broke up and was later scouted by Judas.
- Riku (リク, Riku) (Voiced by: Ayumu Murase (Japanese); Micah Solusod (English) – bass - A Myumon of unconfirmed species and one of the twins supporting Shu☆Zo. Despite his dedication to performing with Trichronika, his soft-spoken nature and lack of confidence have given him a slight inferiority complex.
- Kai (カイ, Kai) (Voiced by: Ryōta Ōsaka (Japanese); Ricco Fajardo (English) – drums - A Myumon of unconfirmed species and Riku's older twin brother. His two favorite things are Shu☆Zo and dancing. He is a caring big brother to Riku, if a bit eccentric.

Criticrista (クリティクリスタ, Kuritikurisuta)
A new group debuting in the game and anime, they are a four-piece band composed of students from the St. Midi Middle School's Student Council. In the anime, the group is working for Unicorn Virtual Music and is eyeing Cyan after she arrived in the sound world. Because of their defeat through a rematch against Plasmagica, Dagger was able to corrupt their Melodisian Stones and turn them all into dark monsters. After they were purified and returned to their original forms, Criticrista joined Banded Rocking Records after Dagger Morse is defeated.
- Rosia (ロージア, Rōjia) (Voiced by: Rina Hidaka (Japanese); Mikaela Krantz (anime), Trina Nishimura (Short!! episode 8) (English)) – guitar and vocals
- Tsukino (ツキノ, Tsukino) (Voiced by: Ai Kayano (Japanese); Natalie Hoover (English)) – keyboards and vocals
- Holmy (ホルミー, Horumī) (Voiced by: Hiromi Igarashi (Japanese); Apphia Yu (English)) – bass and vocals
- Jacklyn (ジャクリン, Jakurin) (Voiced by: Rie Murakawa (Japanese); Morgan Berry (English)) – drums and vocals

Arcareafact (アルカレアファクト, Arukareafakuto)
Arcareafact is an all-male band composed of four wealthy members, signed to the major idol label Judas. The members are named after chemical elements. Titan=Titanium; Selen=Selenium; Argon=Argon; Orion=Aurum. The band's official abbreviation is Arcare (アルカレ, Arukare).
- Titan (チタン, Chitan) voiced by Yūsuke Kobayashi (Japanese); Jason Liebrecht (English) - keyboard and vocals - A blue unicorn Myumon. His parents are famous musicians. He inherited his talent from his parents, however he's the kind of person who hates losing and always tried exceptionally hard since his childhood. At first glance, he has a poker face and a different attitude compared to his band members, but he secretly hides a burning fighting spirit inside. He seems to take interest in Shingancrimsonz, though he believes more in chivalry. Unbeknownst to his fellow band members, he tries to raise his poor brothers by himself.
- Orion (オリオン, Orion) voiced by Taku Yashiro (Japanese); J. Michael Tatum (English) – violin - A G bison Myumon. The band's leader as well as a descendant from the ancient and honorable ENDENCLOTH and heir of a financially powerful family. Until now he has solved all of his problems with the power of money and his sharp eyes hidden behind his glasses. A competent man who's skilled with his hands. His butler Jii is always by his side.
- Selen (セレン, Seren) voiced by Eishin Fudemura (Japanese); Brandon McInnis – bass - A soft lamb Myumon. He's the son of an outer-space super major label's chairman. Because he spent all his time in his parents' library during his childhood he gained a deep knowledge of music. He also loves rumors of minor bands. In contrary to the young boy's appearance, he utters both malicious and mature remarks.
- Argon (アルゴン, Arugon) voiced by Chiharu Sawashiro (Japanese); Marcus D. Stimac (English)– drums - A sonic gazelle Myumon. Before joining Judas, he founded a company and became No.1 on Midi City's ranking of its most wealthy billionaires. Since his hobbies include dancing, working out his muscles, and expanding his business he earns sound dollars while training. With his bright and light mood he tends to annoy his bandmembers a little.
- Jii (じい, Jī) voiced by Tomohisa Asō (Japanese); Kent Williams (English) - Orion's butler.
- Balt (バルト, Baruto) voiced by Ayane Sakura (Japanese); Alison Viktorin (English) - One of Titan's younger brothers.
- Nickel (ニッケル, Nikkeru) voiced by Manami Numakura (Japanese); Lara Woodhull (English) - One of Titan's younger brothers.

Bud Virgin Logic (バッドヴァージンロジック, Baddo Bājin Rojikku)
A mysterious band that appears in the second season allied with Dagger Morse. They have melodies as sharp as a knife and delicate vocals as transparent as glass. They were once innocent until Dagger corrupted them and their Melodisian Stones, forcing them to work for him.
- Ailane (アイレーン, Airēn) voiced by Ruriko Noguchi (Japanese); Leah Clark (English) – vocals and guitar – A lion Myumon with a haughty, commanding gaze, powerful charisma and mystical speech. Immersion into music had made her a bit of klutz. She likes high places and things smaller than herself. She is Aion's younger sister.
- Peipain (ペイペイン, Peipein) voiced by Aimi Tanaka (Japanese); Amanda Lee (English) – bass – A rare mythical Kirin Myumon. Taken in by a mysterious foundation at an early age to serve as Ailane's maid. Now, she keeps an unfazed, watching expression on her face and many weapons hidden in her skirt. Scary when angry.
- Hundreko (ハンドレッコ, Handorekko) voiced by Ibuki Kido (Japanese); Jeannie Tirado (English) – drums – A white tiger Myumoid developed to be Ailane's childhood playmate. Can play knife-drumsticks at amazing speeds. Generally surly, but smiles and laughs when recollecting fond memories.

Uwasanopetals (ウワサノペタルズ, Uwasanopetaruzu)
A band hailing from the countryside of the Sound World. In the anime, all of the members had a brief cameo, portrayed as high school students in the countryside who held Tsurezurenaru Ayatsuri Mugenan in high regard and wished to go to Midi City to cheer them on in person, then later signed a recording contract with Ogasawara prior to the last episode of season 1. The group returned in the second season alongside their manager and later became contracted to Unicorn Virtual Music prior to the finale. All the songs in the game are performed by Luna, an artist signed to Nippon Columbia.
- Shibarin (しばりん) (Voiced by: Marika Kouno (Japanese); Whitney Rodgers (S1-2) Anne Yacto (Stars!!) (English)) – guitar and vocals
- Kittun (きっつん) (Voiced by: Nozomi Furuki (Japanese); Tia Ballard (English)) – drums
- Hakkun (はっくん) (Voiced by: Tomoya Kōsaka (Japanese); Kyle Phillips (English)) – bass
- Pokoe (ぽこえ) (Voiced by: Marumi Koike (Japanese); Ashleigh Domangue (season 1), Jill Harris (season 2) (English)) – keyboard

Shizuku Secret Mind (雫シークレットマインド, Shizuku Shīkurettomaindo)
A band hailing from the water capital of Venicillin, they came to Midi City to perform for the first time. The songs in the game are sung by artist Chihiro.
- Wendy (ウエンディ, Uendi) (Voiced by: Kiyono Yasuno (Japanese); Michelle Rojas (English)) – vocals
- Corriente (コリエンテ, Koriente) (Voiced by: Saki Ogasawara (Japanese); Megan Shipman (English)) – guitar
- Shabobon (シャボボン, Shabobon) (Voiced by: Nozomi Furuki (Japanese); Sarah Wiedenheft (English)) – drums
- Turtle B.I.G (タートルB・I・G, Tātoru B・I・G) – bass

Shinimonogurui (しにものぐるい)
A band originating from Midi City's Yokai Street, composing of family members based around yokai. All of the songs in the game are performed by J-pop artist Marie Ueda.
- Marimari (まりまり) (Voiced by: China Kitahara (Japanese); Brittney Karbowski (English)) – vocals and guitar
- Tsugihagi (つぎはぎ) (Voiced by: Natsuki Kawasaki (Japanese); Josh Grelle (English)) – keyboard
- Duradura (でゅらでゅら, Dyuradyura) – Voiced by: Ryuichi Kijima – guitar
- Monmon (もんもん, Monmon) – Voiced by: Jun Kasama – bass
- Gashigashi (がしがし, Gashigashi) – Voiced by: Kentaro Kumagai – drums

Dolly Dolci (ドーリィドルチ, Dōryi Doruchi)
A Lolita rock band whose motif are based on sweets that appears in the second season. All of them are fans of other bands while being good at making sweets and desserts.
- Candy Lapin (キャンディラパン, Kyandirapan) Voiced by: Mikoi Sasaki (Japanese); Alex Moore (English) – vocals - Leader of Dolly Dolci and a Holland Lop rabbit Myumon.
- Pig Macaron (ピグマカロン, Pigumakaron) Voiced by: Izumi Chiba (Japanese); Terri Doty (English) – drums - Member of Dolly Dolci and a Pig Myumon. She appeared as one of the spectators in season one until it was revealed she's a member of the band.
- Chokyu-Ruiyu (チョキュルイユ, Chokiyurui) – guitar - Member of Dolly Dolci and a squirrel Myumon.
- Cream Teddy (クリームテディ, Kurimu Tedi) – bass - Member of Dolly Dolci and a bear Myumon.

Ninjinriot (忍迅雷音, Shinobu jinrai-on)
A four piece ninja band that came from the future to prevent the Queen of Darkness from invading Sound World and using its energy to conquer the galaxy. They have no known record label and perform exclusive shows on the streets.
- Oboro (朧, Oboro) – voiced by Oscar Seung (English) guitar - Leader, an Oni Myumon.
- Arashi (嵐, Arashi) – Voiced by: Naoya Hirose (Japanese); Justin Briner (English) - vocals and guitar - A Tan Shiba Inu Myumon who is aware of Victorious‘ planned attack on Sound Planet.
- Rin (燐, Rin) -Voiced by Janelle Lutz (English) – bassist - A light brown fox Myumon.
- Kamui (神威, Kamui) – Voiced by: Tsuguo Mogami (Japanese); Jeremy Inman (English) – drums - A Ninmachine Myumon from the future. Upon learning about Victorious' invasion plan, he traveled back in time to find Cyan in the human world and sends her back to Sound World.

Baiganba V (バイガンバー V, Baiganbā V)
A superhero band with a hot heart and a marketing soul. Normally they are employees for the major musical instrument chain of stores, "Revolution Music Store." Every week on its rooftop they hold a "Superhero Live Show.”
- Bai Red (バイレッド, Baireddo) – Voiced by: Tsuyoshi Takahashi (Japanese); Daman Mills (English) - vocals and guitar - He is a red panda Myumon that dons a Red Ranger Super Sentai costume with red panda-like features.
- Bai Yellow (バイイエロー, Baiierō) – bass
- Bai Blue (バイブルー, Baiburū) – guitar
- Bai Pink (バイピンク, Baipinku) – keyboard
- Bai Green (バイグリーン, Baigurīn) – drums

Gaugastrikes (ガウガストライクス, Gaugasutoraikusu)
A three-piece indie band working in Shibu Valley, now a four-piece band after Uchuura joined the band. They were hired to protect the Gates to the purest Melodisian stone lying in the mountains of Sound World. The band is based on the real-life band KFK.
- Kintaurus (キンタウルス, Kintaurusu) – Voiced by: Hirofumi Nojima (Japanese); Seth Magill (English) - vocals and guitar - He has the appearance of a werewolf. Kintaurus likes cardigans. He has an awkward personality. Likes wearing t-shirts with the Kanji for gold (金) written on them but gets told that he/it's lame by fellow member Deyan.
- Deyan (デーヤン, Dēyan) – Voiced by: Shimotsuki Yukari (Japanese); Todd Haberkorn (English) - bass - He has the appearance of a devil. A bit frivolous. His glowing blond hair is his trademark and he loves dressing up and being fashionable. Always criticizes the members' clothes. His aggressive performance is his strong point.
- Uchura (ウチュウラー, Uchuurā) – Voiced by: Sasaki Yoshihito (Japanese); Derick Snow (English) - guitar - The newest member of Gaugastrikes. He was drawn by the exquisite sound waves emitted by Kintaurus' lame t-shirts and came to Midi City from beyond a faraway galaxy. The inside of the space hat that he's always wearing is apparently connected to black holes.
- Daishizen (ダイシゼン, Daishizen) – Voiced by: Yoshihito Ohtori (Japanese); Tyson Rinehart (English) - drums - He's big and reticent. His spirit reaches higher than the clouds. He rarely gets angry but when he does, apparently he's super scary. With his big body and heart, he watches over the members and the fans, a magnanimous man.

Yokazenohorizon (ヨカゼノホライズン, Yokazenohoraizun)
A band that debuted later in the first game's life and is the last band added in the original game. Yokazenohorizon is a four-piece Electronica rock band that hails from Fourthvalley, an area somewhere in Midi City where they play artistic and atmospheric sounds in the Yokaze Bar. The band will later make their formal anime debut in Stars.
- Rikao (リカオ, Rikao) – Voiced by: Makoto Furukawa (Japanese); Christopher Wehkamp (English) - vocals and bass
- Jyaroppu (ジャロップ, Jaroppu) – Voiced by: Taichi Ichikawa – guitar
- Kusuka (クースカ, Kūsuka) – Voiced by: Ryōta Suzuki – keyboard
- Uraragi (ウララギ, Uragi) – Voiced by: Daiki Hamano – drums

Mashumairesh!! (ましゅまいれっしゅ!!)
Debuting first in the Mashumairesh!! anime before appearing in the successor game Fes A Live, Mashumairesh!! is a four-piece rock band who formed after Howan missed an audition for a music competition in Midi City and met up with Himeko, Delmin and Ruhuyu. They are notable for their "popping and emotional sounds,” which sparkle into everyone's hearts with gorgeous and joyful smiles.
- Howan (ほわん) – Voiced by: Hikaru Tono (Japanese); Macy Anne Johnson (English) - vocals and guitar - an Arctic fox Myumon.
- Mashima Himeko (マシマヒメコ, Mashimahimeko) – Voiced by: Yūko Natsuyoshi (Japanese); Giovannie Cruz (English) - vocals and guitar - a striped cat Myumon.
- Delmin (デルミン) – Voiced by: Misaki Watada (Japanese); Emi Lo (English) - vocals and bass - a Devil Mint Kiryu Myumon.
- Ruhuyu (ルフユ) – Voiced by: Aya Yamane (Japanese); Lindsay Sheppard (English) - vocals and drums - a wolf Myumon.

Dokonjofinger (ドコンジョウフィンガー, Dokonjōfingā)
Debuting first in the Mashumairesh!! anime before appearing in the successor game Fes A Live, Dokonjofinger is a heavy metal high school band hailing from the infamous Dokonjo Kita Academy in Midi City. Known for its unique style of heavy rock, they were formed when the principal summoned the 4 of them into his office, telling them that they were to form a band as community service or otherwise be expelled from the school.
- Yasu (ヤス, Yasu) – Voiced by: Kent Itō (Japanese); Stephen Fu (English) – vocals and guitar - a Yatagarasu Myumon.
- Hachin (ハッチン, Hatchin) – Voiced by: Shohei Komatsu (Japanese); Chris Sykes (English) – guitar - a bumblebee Myumon.
- Joe (ジョウ, Jō) – Voiced by: Yūki Ono (Japanese); Aaron Dismuke (English) – bass - a phoenix Myumon.
- Sojun (双循, Sō Jun) – Voiced by: Yusuke Shirai (Japanese); Jarrod Greene (English) – drums - a Komainu Myumon.

Reijingsignal (レイジングシグナル, Reijingushigunaru)
Debuting first in the Mashumairesh!! anime before appearing in the successor game Fes A Live, Reijingsignal is a 3-piece electronic rock band known for their advanced and high-level sound, vocals, and sense. They are shown to have no leader, as they believe that all 3 members are equals that hone themselves against each other to become better.
- Rararin (ララリン, Rararin) – Voiced by: Lynn (Japanese); Jamie Marchi (English) – vocals and guitar - a caracal Myumon.
- Sumomone (スモモネ, Sumomone) – Voiced by: Yū Serizawa (Japanese); Amber Lee Connors (English) – vocals and guitar - a peach flying squirrel Myumon.
- Uiui (ういうい, Uiui) – Voiced by: Minori Suzuki (Japanese); Suzie Yeung (English) – vocals and bass - an ice rabbit Myumon.

Kuronoatmosphere (クロノアトモスフィア, Kuronoatomosufia)
Debuting in Fes A Live, Kuronoatmosphere is a 5-piece punk rock band whose members are themed after time and numbers. The band has broken up due to unknown reasons and were strangely responsible for the sudden spike in Dark Monster threats in MIDI CITY. They all serve as the main antagonists in the game's story.
- 919 (Nyke) (ナイク, Naiku) – Voiced by: Shouta Aoi – vocals and guitar - A Myummon of unknown species (presumed to be a Shisa Lion), who instigated in several Dark Monster attacks in Midi City. He was formerly the leader of the band Kuronoatmosphere until their sudden breakup. After Rocker and several band members finally spotted him, he and the rest of the band members declare his threat to take over MIDI CITY.
- 661 (Roroy) (ロロイ, Roroi) – Voiced by: Yuki Sakakihara – keyboard - A weasel Myummon and twin brother of 659, who is worried about 919 and his relation to the sudden appearance of the Dark Monsters. He and his brother applied for part-time job at Rocker's Live House. However it turned out they were still working with each other and joined Rocker and the others as a mole for the band to spy on their actions and rejoined 919 to announce their grand plans on taking over MIDI CITY.
- 659 (Rocoku) (ロコク, Rokoku) – Voiced by: Daiki Kobayashi – drums - A weasel Myummon and twin brother of 661, who is also worried about 919 and his relation to the sudden appearance of the Dark Monsters. He and his brother applied for part-time job at Rocker's Live House. Similar to 661, his is also a mole spying for the band and rejoined 919 to announce their grand plans on taking over MIDI CITY.
- 151 (Ecoy) (イコイ, Ikoi) – Voiced by: Shunsuke Takeuchi – bass
- 13 (E-me) (イミ, Imi) – Voiced by: Chiaki Kobayashi – guitar

Zerotickholic (ゼロティックホリック, Zerotikkuhorikku)
Debuting in Fes A Live, Zerotickholic is a female rock band originating in St. Midi Middle School, utilizing tantalizing and angelic voices with special musical instruments.
- Gyaraco (ぎゃらこ) – Voiced by: Fairouz Ai – vocals and bass
- Shimmakk (しまっく, Shimakku) – Voiced by: Misato Matsuoka – vocals and guitar
- Leppanyo (れっぱにょ, Reppanyo) – Voiced by: Kaori Maeda – keyboard
- Gilili (ギリリ) – Voiced by: Minami Tanaka – drums

=== Supporting characters ===
Maple Arisugawa (有栖川 メイプル, Arisugawa Meipuru)
Voiced by: Yūji Ueda (Japanese); Sonny Strait (English)
A former agent of Unicorn Virtual Music and currently the President and CEO of Banded Rocking Records, he's an egg Myumon who manages both Plasmagica and Shingancrimsonz. Both serious and goofy, he seems to have a bondage and pain fetish, as he sometimes enjoys being punished by his secretary. Thought to be goofy due to his antics, he is very caring towards the bands he formed and treats them as his family while knowing that music can't be weighed by money. Maple also knows about the existence of Strawberry Heart and its relations to Grateful King.

Angelica (アンゼリカ, Anzerika)
Voiced by: Risa Shimizu (Japanese); Rachel Robinson (English)
The secretary of Banded Rocking Records, she is a mouse Myumon who also looks after both bands. She tends to be strict to Maple and has a dominatrix-like personality.

Grateful King (グレイトフルキング, Gureitofurukingu) / Strawberry Heart (ストロベリーハート, Sutoroberī Hāto)
Voiced by: Hiroyuki Yoshino (Japanese); Justin Cook (English)
Grateful King is a famous composer and singer, whose skills in composition and music are legendary to everyone in Sound World. However, since he was contracted with Unicorn Virtual Music, Dagger was using him in his plans by making him compose the most powerful song that would make him ruler of Sound World. Due to Dagger's evil ambitions, he decided to possess the legendary instrument Strawberry Heart to rescue Cyan after she was brought to Sound World while using it as a way to communicate with her and the others. Now serving as Cyan's instructor in Midi City, it gives her advice on how to defeat Dark Monsters. It's sometimes called "Mr. Berry" by Cyan due to its long name. Later in the series, the members of BRR became aware of its existence.

Master (マスター, Masutā)
Voiced by: Shigeru Chiba (Japanese); Ben Phillips (English)
Master is a hedgehog cat Myumon and the owner of Studio UNZ, the place where both Mashumairesh!! and Dokonjofinger usually practice. He treats the two bands like part of his family and guides them in various ways through their music.

Rocker (ロッカー, Rokkā)
The main protagonist of Fes A Live and also the main avatar for the player, Rocker is a Myumon of unknown species (appearance is depended on the customization by the player) who once lived in GURF, a town in the outskirts of Midi City which has since declined due to lack of tourism from music bands. One day, he revisited his family's music shop and found an old amplifier, which is possessed by the spirit of Jeepe Parisugawa. Jeepe asked Rocker to help him revitalize tourism in GURF and also solve the mystery behind his death. On his mission, met up his old friend: an amateur photographer and paparazzi named Rameca and told her to join in. As he and Rameca helped each other with their mission, they also investigate strange appearances of Dark Monsters all over Midi City.

Rameca Pashalikowa (ラメカ・パシャリコワ, Rameka Pasharikowa)
Voiced by: Karin Takahashi (Japanese); Risa Mei (English)
Rocker's closer friend, Rameca is a Chinchilla Myumon as well as an amateur photographer and writer for articles on Midi City's best bands. Though a newbie, she aims to be the best reporter in all of Midi City, which also the reason she joined Rocker's cause on boosting music tourism in their town. Her name is a play on the word “camera.”

Jeepe Parisugawa (ジーペ・パリスガワ, Jīpe Parisugawa)
Voiced by: Yasuhiro Takato
A deceased ghost who has possessed an old amplifier inside Rocker's old music store. He was once a famous guitarist in Midi City and appeared in GURF 69 years ago, before his mysterious death after a live show, causing his soul to wander all over Midi City. He asked Rocker to revive the old town back to its former glory.

=== Antagonists ===
Ogasawara (オガサワラ)
Voiced by: Yoshihito Sasaki (Japanese); Brandon Potter (English)
The agent for Criticrista and Dagger's employee. He is fired after Criticrista is defeated by Plasmagica in the battle of the bands, but then became an agent for Uwasanopetals prior to the season 1 finale and resigned as an agent to Dagger Morse. However, he is then reinstated to the company again in the season 2 finale.

Dagger Morse (ダガー・モーリス, Dagā Mōrisu)
Voiced by: Takaya Kuroda (Japanese); Chris Rager (English)
The main antagonist of season 1, he is the president of Unicorn Music and is the one responsible for the appearance of the Dark Monsters. He was defeated by Cyan in the first season finale but it's revealed in the second season that he survived and recruited Bud Virgin Logic to be his new band. He is mistakenly accused of working for the Queen of Darkness Victorious, but it is later revealed he has no allegiance with her whatsoever. In the end, he teamed up with Maple in order to defeat her and change the future.

Victorious (ヴィクトリアス, Vuikutoriasu)
Voiced by: Miyuki Sawashiro (Japanese); Elizabeth Maxwell (English)
The true main antagonist of season 2. A female devil Myumon, she is known as the Queen of Darkness, who rules the planet Ordinis, a harsh world filled only with people desiring results and efficiency. As a child, she and her best friend Astreal both believed in justice and loved to sing together. However, by the end of the exams, she came to believe that only the strong can survive and the weak die when she fell from a cliff after Astreal betrayed her even though she helped Astreal earlier. This caused her Melodisian stone to be corrupted, resulting in her becoming cold, evil and bitter, hating music, and her heart being filled with hatred, rage, and jealousy. When she gained new powers from the darkness, she ended up scaring Astreal into falling off the cliff and claimed the throne as the new ruler of Ordinis. In her later years, she commanded an invasion fleet to commit mass genocide on several planets to extract their Sound Energy. She planned to take over the Sound Universe and create a world of hopelessness, darkness, and despair. She also went undercover as a secretary for Arcareafact, until she revealed she betrayed them and stole their money and belongings.

== Media ==
=== Video games ===
The game was first unveiled by Sanrio on the game's official website and was first released on July 30, 2013, for iOS and later on Android platforms on June 27, 2014. Sanrio's Chief Director of License Business Akito Sasaki said at a licensing expo that the reason for the game's artistic distance from Sanrio's usual style is because it is geared toward young boys (although it ended up appealing older girls around 15–19 years old). Several promotional videos were also released for the game, and were uploaded to Sanrio's official YouTube account. Service for the game was discontinued on December 26, 2019.

A sequel game to the series titled Show by Rock!! Fes A Live was developed by Now Production and published by Square-Enix in both iOS and Android devices on March 12, 2020. On September 29, 2022, it was announced that the game's server will shut down on November 30.

=== Anime ===
A 12-episode anime adaptation of the game animated by Bones aired on Tokyo MX between April 5 and June 21, 2015. The series is directed by Takahiro Ikezoe and written by Touko Machida, with music composed by Yasuharu Takanashi, Funta7 and Rega Sound. The opening theme is "Seishun wa Non-Stop!" (青春はNon-Stop!; lit. "Youth is Non-Stop!") and the ending theme is "Have a Nice Music!!", both performed by Plasmagica (Cyan (Gt. & Vo.) (Eri Inagawa / Bryn Apprill), Chuchu (Gt. & Vo.) (Sumire Uesaka / Alexis Tipton), Retoree (Ba. & Vo.) (Manami Numakura / Caitlin Glass) and Moa (Dr. & Vo.) (Ayane Sakura / Monica Rial)). Shimomura of Sanrio commented that "Sanrio is targeting males who like anime and games, a demographic we haven't targeted up until now, in order to develop cross-media marketing through games, anime, and SNS." Inagawa commented that "This has been a long-awaited anime adaptation. I'm so happy I could cry."

The series is licensed in North America by Funimation, who simulcast the series as it aired and began streaming a dubbed version from June 7, 2015. Funimation released the first season on Blu-ray and DVD on December 6, 2016, in North America and on February 20, 2017, in the United Kingdom.

A short anime series titled Show By Rock!! Short!! aired from July 4 to September 19, 2016, and is also licensed by Funimation. The main theme is "Do-Re-Mi-Fa Party" (ドレミファPARTY) by Plasmagica. A second season, Show By Rock!!#, aired from October 2 to December 18, 2016. The opening theme is "Heart o Rock!!" (ハートをRock!!; lit. "We'll Rock Your Heart!!") while the ending theme is "My Song is YOU!!", both performed by Plasmagica.

A third season, titled Show by Rock!! Mashumairesh!! (SHOW BY ROCK!!ましゅまいれっしゅ!!, Shō Bai Rokku!! Mashiyumairesshu!!), is produced by Kinema Citrus and aired on Tokyo MX, BS Fuji, UNB, SUN, and TV Tokyo on January 9, 2020. Seung Hui Son directs the series, with Daisuke Tazawa as the series's scriptwriter and Nobuyuki Itō as character designer. Polygon Pictures handles the series's 3D animation scenes while both Yasuharu Takanashi and Funta7 returned to compose the series's music in Pony Canyon. Funimation has licensed the third season. The season aired for 12 episodes.

A fourth season titled Show By Rock!! Stars!! aired on Tokyo MX, BS Fuji, SUN, and UHB from January 7 to March 25, 2021. Takahiro Ikezoe and Touko Machida both return to direct and write the series alongside new director Daigo Yamagishi. Yasuharu Takanashi, Funta7, and Akiya Suzuki are returning to compose the series' music. ENGI will handle the series's 3D animation scenes with Hiroki Yoshioka as CG producer. Both Plasmagica and Mashumairesh performed the series's opening theme "Do Re Mi Fa STARS!!" (ドレミファSTARS!!) with Mashumairesh performing the series' ending theme "Hoshisora Light Story" (星空ライトストーリー, Hoshizora Raito Sutōrī; "Starry Sky Light Story"). Funimation licensed the series and will stream it on its website in North America and the British Isles, in Europe through Wakanim, and in Australia and New Zealand through AnimeLab.

As of June 2026, the North American Funimation/Crunchyroll releases of all four seasons of Show by Rock!! on Blu-ray and DVD were out of print.

=== Manga ===
A manga adaptation of the first anime was written and illustrated by Takemaru Yokoshima and was serialized in Kadokawa Shoten's Young Ace magazine from July 4, 2020, to May 4, 2022. The manga's first tankōbon volume was released on December 28, 2020.

== Reception ==
Nick Creamer of Anime News Network gave the first episode a positive rating, stating that the "debut was a wild merry-go-round of delirious nonsense, but most of it was the enjoyable kind of nonsense" and "this was a wild and largely entertaining debut, but it also leaves me with plenty of reservations. Shows that rely on novelty to stay interesting often fizzle out quickly, and Show By Rock!!'s premise doesn't necessarily seem unique or engaging enough to have much staying power once the sparkles fade." However, Amy McNulty gave the first two episodes a B+, saying that "Show By Rock!! is hard to pin down. It's like a pinch of Di Gi Charat, a dash of The Idolmaster and a quart of Sanrio-style magical girls mixed together and thrown into a frenetic cyberpunk setting. It attempts to do too much at once, yet it manages to juggle plot points fairly well so far."

The popularity of the anime is also shown at the 30th Sanrio Character Ranking with Plasmagica ranking at sixth place and Shingan Crimsonz at second place.
