= The Lost Village (TV series) =

Japanese anime television series

- Main key visual

迷家-マヨイガ- (Mayoiga)
- Created by: Diomedéa; Pony Canyon
- Anime television series
- Directed by: Tsutomu Mizushima
- Written by: Mari Okada
- Music by: Masaru Yokoyama
- Studio: Diomedéa
- Licensed by: NA: Ponycan USA
- Original network: WOWOW Prime, TBS, MBS, CBC, BS-TBS
- Original run: April 2, 2016 – June 18, 2016
- Episodes: 12
- Manga

Mayoiga ~Tsumi to Batsu~
- Written by: Subaru Fuji
- Published by: Shogakukan
- Imprint: Ura Shōnen Sunday Comics
- Original run: April 8, 2016 – November 5, 2016
- Volumes: 3
- Novel
- Written by: Tsukasa Tsuchiya
- Illustrated by: Kei
- Imprint: Ponican Books Light Novel Series
- Published: September 17, 2016

The Lost Village (迷家-マヨイガ-, Mayoiga) is a Japanese anime television series produced by Diomedéa, directed by Tsutomu Mizushima and written by Mari Okada, with character designs by Naomi Ide and music by Masaru Yokoyama. The series began airing on April 2, 2016, and finished airing on June 18, 2016. The title, Mayoiga (迷い家; "Illusion House"), originally stands for a Japanese folklore.

== Plot ==
A group of 30 young men and women go on a bus tour to Nanaki Village, a shadowy village with an urban legend of being a utopia. Many seek either to start a new life or escape the troubles of their old one. Upon arrival, they discover the village has no inhabitants, with small signs of life that are slowly deteriorating. The truth of Nanaki Village has yet to be discovered.

== Characters ==
Mitsumune (光宗)
Voiced by: Kōdai Sakai
A seemingly naïve, gullible and optimistic boy who joined the Nanakimura Village tour because he was tired of his overprotective and emotionally abusive mother. Because he attended an all-boys school, he rarely talks to girls and fears that he falls in love and gets manipulated too easily by other people. During his childhood, his twin brother Tokimune was killed in an accident and he had to take his name to help his mentally unstable mother recover. Ever since then, he's felt that his identity has been locked away.
Masaki (真咲)
Voiced by: Yuka Aisaka
A mysterious and emotional girl on the tour whom Mitsumune takes upon himself to defend. When she was young she created an invisible character in her mind named "Reiji" to be her close friend and buddy with whom she could chat and spend time with. However, when she realized that she was the only one who could see and interact with Reiji, she started secluding and doubting herself. When she heard rumors about a village which can make your trauma take form and appear, she visits Nanakimura Village to ascertain herself that Reiji was real and to actually meet him. However, during the last episode Reiji appears as her Nanaki and explains to her that he was nothing more than a figment of her imagination created as a means of filling the loneliness inside her. Unable to accept reality, Masaki flees the area whilst Reiji tells Mitsumune to chase after her. When Mitsumune catches up to Masaki he tells her that he will take Reiji's place in her heart and be with her so she could share all her thoughts and feelings with him. Blushing upon these words she is finally able to accept that Reiji was an illusion, causing him to disappear from Nanakimura Village. Masaki is then finally able to leave alongside Mitsumune. It is implied that after the events of the series, Masaki and Mitsumune started dating.
Hayato (颯人)
Voiced by: Taku Yashiro
Mitsumune's best friend who joined under the handle of Speedstar. He's calm, aloof, and pragmatic. He defended Mitsumune from bullies in school and reminds him to do whatever he tells him to avoid getting into trouble or standing out too much, acting as a defender for Mitsumune in return for his friendship. In actuality, Hayato is deeply possessive of Mitsumune, doing everything in his power to reinforce the idea that Mitsumune needs him due to his own feelings of powerlessness after years of physical and emotional abuse from his parents, who would beat and lock him up in their attic with a picture of his grandmother, who had died there after her senility began hurting the family's public image. He hates Masaki as he believes she is "seducing" Mitsumune away from him and even tries to murder her on one occasion to remove her from Mitsumune's life. He, unlike Mitsumune, joined the tour because he thinks that Nanakimura Village is just a hoax and wanted to prove it.
Koharun (こはるん)
Voiced by: Kaoru Sakura
A woman working for the First Life Do-Over Tour who used much folklore, mythology and a mysterious email to pinpoint the location of the fabled Nanakimura Village.
Valkana (ヴァルカナ, Varukana)
Voiced by: Tatsuhisa Suzuki
An aggressive, determined, and stubborn man who takes it upon himself to keep the others in check. He is trying to escape his life in which he was made a scapegoat by the company he worked for. Despite claiming he intends to never take all the responsibility for a failure again he keeps putting himself into leadership positions in which he very well might.
Lion (リオン, Rion)
Voiced by: Hiromi Igarashi
A quiet and mysterious young girl in a yellow hoodie, she claims to be capable of seeing when people will die. She's very suspicious of Mitsumune, believing him to be a danger, and views everyone on the trip as being psychological powder kegs. Her distrust towards others is a result of the fact her mother abused her power in order to get rich quickly, using her ability to predict if someone is dying and forcing them to buy her expensive charms.
Lovepon (らぶぽん, Rabupon)
Voiced by: Ai Kakuma
A girl obsessed with execution who claims to have joined the tour to protect her identity. Her obsession for execution comes from her traumatic childhood, where she and her mother would often be beaten up by her mother's monk lover, whom her mother only met to pay off the huge debts left behind by Lovepon's father.
Maimai (マイマイ)
Voiced by: Ayaka Shimizu
A girl betrayed by her friends and boyfriend and wanted to go somewhere new to start fresh. She flirts with and teases Mitsumune because he reminds her of her ex-boyfriend, but she is infuriated when he tells her that he's not interested in her.
Nanko (ナンコ)
Voiced by: Konomi Tada
A woman that claims to be a famous private investigator. While in Nanakimura she puts her deductive and detective skills to use.
Jack (ジャック)
Voiced by: Kosuke Miyoshi
A quiet and mysterious boy with a violent past. His actual name is "Sasaki" and he was a childhood friend of Maimai. He was sent to a juvenile detention center after stabbing one of his classmates. The reason he attacked the classmate was because he was suffering from constant bullying and eventually snapped. When Hyōketsu no Judgeness was constantly pestering him about the similar Japanese characters in their names and accusing him of copying his name, he attacks him with a garden hoe. The others subdue him and imprison him within a cell they found in the village. However, he later escapes and is only seen briefly when most of the members of the tour try to leave the village.
Yura Mikage (美影 ユラ, Mikage Yura)
Voiced by: Yoshiaki Hasegawa
A meticulous and calculating man who claims to have worked for a trading company. He admits to being an "elite", having expected to inherit his parents' business, get married and settle down. He claims to have joined the tour because he was tired of treading the beaten path. In actuality, he was an engineer for a toy company who destroyed his career and reputation after a toy train he had staked everything on failed miserably due to a minor oversight on his part. He slowly becomes more and more unhinged over the course of the series, eventually going rogue with Lovepon to murder Masaki.
Hyōketsu no Judgeness (氷結のジャッジネス)
Voiced by: Atsushi Abe
A man who wears an eyepatch and a 20,000 yen suit, he claims to have made peace with the world and warns others not to get too close to him. However, he is just putting on a persona to make him seem tougher than he really is. In English, his name stands for "Judgement of freeze".
Nyanta (ニャンタ)
Voiced by: Eri Inagawa
A gun enthusiast who claims to have joined the tour so she could shoot things and people wouldn't complain as much. Her language is often linked to cats, saying things like "meow" instead of "me" or "now", "purrfect" instead of "perfect", and "furrocious" instead of "ferocious". She became a gun enthusiast when she was a victim of bullying and suddenly found herself in front of a gun shop. She started to build guns and use them to shoot the bullies with Bb bullets from balconies. When the bullies found out they tortured her with wasps, giving her an acute fear of both stinging insects and buzzing noises.
Manbe (まんべ)
Voiced by: Junji Majima
Pii-tan's "fiancée". They left their homes when their parents tried to break them up, which is later revealed to be because Manbe is already married and Pii-tan is just his mistress. Manbe is always offering to take the burden for or to sacrifice himself for Pii-tan. He and Pii-tan are rarely seen without each other.
Yottsun (よっつん)
Voiced by: Junji Majima
A rapper who claims his wife ended their relationship and left him alone. He takes particular interest in the women on the tour. After going after Masaki and pulling her aside. When he goes missing, only Masaki is found, covered in dirt. She claims that he noticed something before running after it and she tripped and fell where they found her. Later Mitsumune claims to see his dead body floating down river, but nothing is found. However, he is later found to be still alive after he was saved by a professor whom he calls "God". He then reveals that his parents were big in classical music but he had neither talent nor interest, and so turned to rap instead; he came to the village out of frustration as he felt he wasn't successful as a rapper, but managed to leave the village after he accepted that, no matter how successful or unsuccessful he was, he was who he wanted to be.
Yamauchi (山内)
Voiced by: Kazuki Narumi
Joined the tour under the handle of "Pink Goddess". He claims he joined the tour because he became a shell of his former self after he stopped taking care of his parents and was looking to lead a carefree life.
Wanko (わんこ)
Voiced by: Kōhei Amasaki
A young boy who claims he has poor health and not long left to live, hoping to do something interesting with his life before he died.
Yūna (ユウナ)
Voiced by: Kaede Yuasa
A feminist who ran into sexual harassment and bullying at work and strives to create a world where women can live truly meaningful lives as human beings.
Yūne (ユウネ)
Voiced by: Konomi Tada
A girl who shared the same online username as Yūna so was given the name Yūne instead.
Yūno (ユウノ)
Voiced by: Sayaka Senbongi
A woman who shared the same online username as Yūna. She didn't want to have to compete over the name, saying that sort of competitiveness is what made people want to leave societies, so she took the name "Yūno" instead.
Pii-tan (ぴーたん)
Voiced by: Lynn
Manbe's "fiancée", they ran away from their homes when their parents tried to break them up. She and Manbe are rarely seen without each other. However, her cute personality is just an act and she actually finds Manbe to be incredibly needy and annoying, as she only decided to start a relationship with him to leech of his family's wealth.
Soy Latte (ソイラテ)
Voiced by: Lynn
A former nurse who claims she's trying to get a fresh start in a new place and find her path.
Nettaiya (熱帯夜)
Voiced by: Sakura Nakamura
A woman who joined the tour to get away from a stubborn stalker. The only shoes she packed for the tour were high heels. She is very flirtatious towards the men on the tour, and acts quite carefree all the time.
Naana (なあな)
Voiced by: Sayaka Nakaya
A girl who claims to be "all dried up" from being in the "Tokyo Desert" and is looking for a better living environment. She only brought vitamins and candy with her.
Dahara (ダーハラ)
Voiced by: Shinya Takahashi
The representative for the "ISG" ("It's Super Genetic!") organization running the "First Life Do-Over Tour". He tries to keep the group motivated and calm the others when they're fighting. However, his role as one of the tour organizers makes him suspicious. He eventually reveals that his perky personality was just a façade, and the entire reason he organized the trip with Koharun was because he believed she'd have sex with him if he did.
Toshi Boy (トシボーイ)
Voiced by: Shinya Takahashi
A boy who claims he never felt like he was who he truly is.
Pūko (プゥ子)
Voiced by: Shiori Sugiura
A girl looking for love on the tour. She uses the biblical reference of Adam and Eve to describe herself and her future partner. She appears to have been friends with Maimai before the tour and tries to get her to pursue Mitsumune.
Jigoku no Gōka (地獄の業火)
Voiced by: Shun Horie
A survivalist who takes survival of the fittest seriously. He travels with a large number of expensive survival gear and approaches all things pragmatically. He once attempted to join the JSDF, but failed after he tried to have silicon injected into his scalp to meet the minimum height requirement. In English, his name means "Fire of Hell".
Dozaemon (ドザえもん)
Voiced by: Tarusuke Shingaki
A big guy who likes eating and claims he joined the tour because he was tired of his hum-drum lifestyle. He uses his name as an adjective when speaking.
Toriyasu (鳥安)
Voiced by: Tarusuke Shingaki
A member of a yakitori business who accrued massive debts. He wanted to join a world with no foreign currency exchanges. He seems to be a laid back individual.

=== Others ===
Driver
Voiced by: Satoshi Mikami
The driver of the tour who initially disapproves of the tour member's plans to run away from their lives' problems and preaches to them about his own rough lifestyle and how he has to carry on regardless. Although he hates the tour and his negligent driving nearly gets them killed, he finds his own reason to stay in Nanakimura village when he sees something in the woods. He later claims he is seeing his dead daughter and desires to be with her. Eventually it is revealed that he blamed himself for his daughter's death and is able to leave the village when he accepts that she is gone.
Reiji
Voiced by: Ryōta Ōsaka
Reiji is Masaki's cousin and the reason why she's coming back to Nanakimura. It is revealed that Reiji is actually Masaki's Nanaki and was a character created by Masaki's imagination when she was small to keep her company as a friend.

== Media ==
=== Anime ===
The opening theme titled "Gensou Drive" (幻想ドライブ, Gensō Doraibu) was sung by Ami Wajima, while the ending theme titled "Ketsuro" (結露) was sung by Rina Katahira.

==== Episode list ====
No.	Official English title Original Japanese title	Original release date
1	"Look Before You Leap" "Tekkyō o Tataite Wataru" (鉄橋を叩いて渡る)	April 2, 2016
30 people using online pseudonyms gather on a single bus to head to the mysterious Nanaki Village to start a new life or escape from their old one. After getting annoyed by Valkana, the bus driver snaps and threatens to crash the bus and commit group suicide until Masaki pukes on his uniform. At a rest stop, a woman named Koharun appears to guide the bus group to a bridge shrouded in fog that supposedly leads to the village.
2	"Blinding Mist" "Issunsaki wa Kiri" (一寸先は霧)	April 9, 2016
Valkana yells at the bus driver to keep moving forward as the path narrows until the bus itself tumbles off a short cliff. The group decides to abandon their wallets to pay the driver for his trouble and continue along until they reach the village. However, the village is completely abandoned, with dust covering everything as if no one had used the houses in a year. While searching through a house, Yottsun decides to try to seduce Masaki, dragging her away from the main group. The bus driver reappears and decides to join the group in the village, as others wonder where Yottsun and Masaki went.
3	"Aloof" "Bōjaku Bujin" (傍若無人)	April 16, 2016
The group forms a search party to find the missing members - Yottsun and Masaki - but find what seems to be a large bear. As Mitsumune runs away, he spots a bruised and cowering Masaki. The group tries to interrogate her on Yottsun's whereabouts, but she provides little information as Mitsumune defends her. Later, Dahara tries to calm down the group by organizing sleeping arrangements and dinner. In one of the rooms, Jack gets angry with Hyoketsu when he accuses him of copying his persona, and attacks him with a hoe. The boys restrain him as Lovepon screams for his execution, but Mitsumune and Maimai plead for mercy, and Valkana defuses the situation by throwing Jack in an underground cell he found. Later, Valkana reveals his backstory to Koharun. That night, Mitsumune runs into Maimai while going to see Jack. Lovepon then reappears, hoping they wish to execute him. When Mitsumune refuses, Lovepon tries to kill him instead. Mitsumune manages to throw her off when he spots Yottsun's body floating down the river in front of him.
4	"Yottsun's Drowning" "Yottsun no Kawanagare" (よっつんの川流れ)	April 23, 2016
The group loses sight of Yottsun's body in the river. After discussing the safety situation, Mikage decides to leave the village and the majority of the group joins him to get back to the bus, while nine members of the group stay behind. After failing to get the bus unstuck, Mikage's group try to navigate through the forest on foot, but find themselves going in circles as the mysterious animal voices continue to frighten them at every turn. Hyoketsu spots an escaped Jack and slips off a cliff. Mikage's group find some old train tracks and try to walk along them until Maimai spots a "giant Mitsumune" in the train tunnel. Meanwhile, back at the village, the bus driver catches a glimpse of what appears to be his long-dead daughter.
5	"Three Yunas Is A Crowd" "Yūna Sannin Iru to Magirawashii" (ユウナ3人いると紛らわしい)	April 30, 2016
As Mikage's group returns to the village sans Hyoketsu, the group discusses the strange sounds they keep hearing, and how each person hears a different sound. Mikage publicly accuses Koharun of being a killer while Lion claims to see ghosts of dead people and claims Mitsumune disappeared in front of her for a second. The group also discover Jack's cell empty with a broken lock, but are unsure of who let him out. Mikage gathers Nyanta, Jigoku and Lovepon to help him interrogate Mitsumune, who he suspects of somehow being involved. That night, Lion tells Mitsumune she can't actually see dead people, but walks away muttering that she can sense when people are about to die. Mitsumune is captured by Mikage's partners and thrown in the cell, but before Lovepon can torture him, Masaki sets a fire to distract Mitsumune's captors before busting him out. As she is about to reveal some information to him, Mitsumune spots a giant beast that he calls "Tokimune."
6	"The Monk's Immorality" "Bōzu no Fudōtoku" (坊主の不道徳)	May 7, 2016
Masaki and Mitsumune flee from the giant monster while Mikage's team confirms the fire was a controlled burn meant to distract them. Suddenly, one by one their fears take on the shape of giant beasts as flashbacks reveal their tragic pasts: Lovepon had a harsh childhood with a corrupt monk who abused her and her mother. Nyanta was relentlessly bullied by other schoolgirls and tied down underneath a beehive after she got back at them. Jigoku trained for months to become a JGSDF Ranger, tried having silicone injected into his head to pass the height requirement, but still failed the initial exam. Mikage was an ambitious manager at a toy train company who made a big mistake that caused his peers to laugh at him. As the group brings Mikage's team back to the village, Koharun talks about an old news article she found, reporting Masaki as missing years ago.
7	"When the Cat's Away, The Mice Will Play Mischief" "Oni no Inu Ma ni Warudakumi" (鬼のいぬ間に悪だくみ)	May 14, 2016
Mitsumune falls off a short cliff, and briefly flashes back to the past where his twin brother Tokimune died trying to show off to him. In the hospital, Mitsumune's mother refused to believe Tokimune was dead, and the family kept using Mitsumune as a stand-in for him. When Mitsumune regains consciousness, Masaki leads him to a train tunnel that she claims will lead him back to his past life, but he must face his own monster first. However, the monster punches him back. Mitsumune then wanders back to the village, where the rest of the group is convinced that Masaki is a ghost. Later, the group captures Masaki and ties her up to a post, thinking her death will stop the monsters. Mitsumune tries to stop Hayato and the others from cutting her when Masaki decides to tell everyone the truth.
8	"Visit Nanaki Before Doubting Masaki" "Nanaki Tazunete Masaki o Utagau" (納鳴訪ねて真咲を疑う)	May 21, 2016
Masaki tells the group a story of how she first found Nanaki Village in the past with her cousin Reiji, who saw a beast that she could not. She claims to have fallen off a cliff and then awoke near a highway, later joining the bus tour to find Reiji again. However, the others interrogate her for the discrepancies between her story and the newspaper article that says she went missing and was never found. The crowd tries to kill her again until the bus breaks through a fence and the driver reappears, taking Masaki and Mitsumune with him, along with Hayato who had gotten stuck in the door as it closed. While the group tries to figure out how to catch the bus, the driver begs Masaki to summon his daughter, convinced she is a ghost. Later that night, Nanko and Lion chat with Maimai by the river about recent events. Valkana and Koharun sneak out to test their own theory when they find themselves under arrow attack by a fearful Hyoketsu.
9	"Hyoketsu in the Moonlight" "Gekka Hyōketsu" (月下氷結)	May 28, 2016
After being stopped by Valkana, Hyoketsu mentions a man who rescued him and told him to attack anyone approaching the tunnel, before being shot by an arrow himself. Meanwhile, the bus driver decides to try driving through the tunnel to find his daughter again, over Masaki's objections. The bus driver abruptly vanishes after seeing what appears to be his daughter on the bus. Masaki, Hayato and Mitsumune all find themselves in a similar but different village as Masaki finds a message that Reiji left awhile ago. After Masaki excuses herself, Hayato tells Mitsumune about his past, how he was abused by his parents for even the slightest deviation from their plans for him. He found escape in transferring his emotional abuse to Mitsumune, and begs him to continue their relationship, but Mitsumune refuses and runs away. Mitsumune runs into Valkana and the two encounter their own monsters, but Mitsumune's monster appears a lot smaller than before as he chases it over a cliff. Nanko tries to have Maimai test her theory about coming to terms with their respective pasts, when Jack appears and attacks the women, only to be blindsided by a different boy. Later, Mitsumune awakens in an unfamiliar room.
10	"Danger Past, God Forgotten" "Kurushii Toki no Kamisama Danomi" (苦しい時の神様頼み)	June 4, 2016
Mitsumune wakes up in a hospital where he is surprised to discover his dad referring to him by his real name. After chatting with his dad, he heads to the roof of the hospital to find Yottsun telling him they were both saved by "God." The God in question turns out to be Professor Kamiyama. Elsewhere, Nanko, Maimai and Lion find they were saved by Masaki's ex-partner, Reiji. Kamiyama and Reiji tell their respective groups about how Nanaki Village preys upon the dark secrets hidden within people's deepest psyches (the "Nanaki"), and only by facing them can they return to the real world, but abruptly cutting off the Nanaki within will lead to problems with their real bodies as well. Meanwhile, the majority of the group starts feeling lethargic and irritable, Valkana and Hayato try to find Masaki, and Hyoketsu and Jack try to apologize to their "boss," who turns out to be Koharun.
11	"Get In the Bus, And It'll Get the Song In You" "Basu ni Noreba Utagokoro" (バスに乗れば唄心)	June 11, 2016
Valkana and Nanko's group return to the village to find most of the group lazing around on the floor for unknown reasons. Nanko talks about the Nanaki affecting everyone when Hyoketsu and Jack start shooting flaming arrows at the building. After taking a couple girls hostage, Jack and Hyoketsu tell them about Koharun and her plans to raise an ultra-powerful Nanaki. Meanwhile, Koharun plays off Hayato's deep insecurities, increasing his own Nanaki. Elsewhere, the bus driver comes to terms with his daughter's death. Mitsumune tries to re-enter the village but finds he cannot, as he had partially dealt with his own issues already. However, the bus driver arrives and takes both Mitsumune and Yottsun back to the village, but not before his own Nanaki tells Mitsumune that Reiji himself is a Nanaki. Suddenly, the driver disappears again, forcing Mitsumune to crash the bus in the forest where Mikage and Lovepon have hunted down Masaki, still seeing her as a witch. As Mitsumune gets off the bus, a giant, scaly Nanaki appears in front of the group.
12	"Nanaki Mirrors Your Soul" "Nanaki wa Kokoro no Kagami" (ナナキは心の鏡)	June 18, 2016
The giant monster turns out to be Hayato's Nanaki, complete with a tiny birdcage on top for entrapping Mitsumune's own Nanaki. Hayato attacks the group and captures Mitsumune, but Mitsumune manages to talk him down. However, Koharun riles Hayato up by playing on his insecurities again, causing his Nanaki to rage out of control. While the group tries to run back to the village, Koharun chats with Kamiyama on a two-way radio. She turns out to be his daughter, looking for a way to revive his Nanaki to stop his rapid aging by creating a super-powerful Nanaki with the bus tour, though Kamiyama asks her to leave him be. Meanwhile, Hayato decides to face his Nanaki head-on and both of them disappear. Reiji appears at the village to fill in the rest of the bus tour group on the truth about Nanaki. Mitsumune goes back to rescue Masaki and both of them come to terms with their respective Nanaki, which also leads to Masaki realizing that Reiji was an imaginary friend she could never let go. With Mitsumune's help, both of their Nanaki disappear inside them. Back at the village, the members of the bus tour decide to split up between those who wish to return, and those who wish to stay in the village. The leaving party finds themselves back on the bus with the bus driver at the wheel, as he drives them back home.

=== Manga ===
A manga adaptation titled Mayoiga ~Tsumi to Batsu~ (迷家～ツミトバツ～) was drawn by Subaru Fuji. It was serialized online on Shogakukan's MangaOne app between April 8, 2016, and November 5, 2016, and has been published by Shogakukan in three tankōbon volumes.

==== Volume list ====
No.	Japanese release date	Japanese ISBN
1	June 10, 2016	978-4-09-127314-7
2	October 12, 2016	978-4-09-127392-5
3	February 10, 2017	978-4-09-127520-2

=== Novel ===
A spin-off novel written by Tsukasa Tsuchiya and illustrated by Kei, titled Mayoiga: Yami yori Idete, Yami yori Kuroshi (迷家-マヨイガ- 闇より出でて、闇より黒し) features an original story that focuses on Lion and was released on September 17, 2016.

== See also ==
- Japanese haunted towns
