= Japanese haunted towns =

Japanese haunted towns are towns legendarily inhabited by ghosts (yōkai). These include Yōkai Street (officially known as Jōkyo Street or Taishōgun shopping street), in Kyoto and the Yōkaichi of Shiga Prefecture.

== Ōbokeyōkai village ==
Ōbokeyōkai Village in the Tokushima Prefecture has developed a yōkai culture. Legend has it that yōkai inhabit the village. Some 15,000 people were identified as residents in the 1950s. However, reports regarding yōkai sightings and yōkai-related phenomena led to a mass exodus. In 2013, the village was home to only 4,000 permanent residents.

This village is said to be a birthplace of konakijijī, and is the source of many yōkai legends. To capitalize upon the interests of Japanese pop culture and as a sign of respect for their fellow yōkai residents, this village erected statues of yōkai and holds various "yōkai events" annually.

=== History ===
In 1998, locals began to investigate the village and uncovered its legend as a birthplace of konakijijī and yōkai. In 2001, they put up a statue of konakijijī and started a yōkai festival. In 2010, a rest area in this village was remade into a yōkai mansion and many statues ofyōkai are displayed there.

=== Events and buildings ===
People in this village have held many events and built many structures. The biggest event is the Yōkai Festival held every year in November. Yokai night walks, a disguise contest, poster exhibitions, and guided tours are also held. In addition, there is a yōkai mansion as a roadside station, where legends about yōkai are displayed. Furthermore, many sculptures of yōkai stand in various places throughout the village.

=== Stories about Yōkai ===
In Ōbokeyokai village, stories about yōkai have been handed down from generation to generation. For example, stories about konakijijī, hitotsumenyūdō, tengu, kappa (folklore), and so on. More than one hundred and fifty stories exist now. Ancient people scared children with stories of yōkai, to prevent them from doing dangerous things.

== Mizuki Shigeru Road, Sakaiminato ==
Mizuki Shigeru road is a street with many statues of yōkai in Sakaiminato, Tottori. Sakaiminato is the birthplace of Shigeru Mizuki, who is the author of GeGeGe no Kitarō, a famous Japanese comic. Mizuki Shigeru road has many statues of yōkai and facilities related to yōkai.

=== Attractions ===
Statues of yōkai, a memorial house, a shrine and many shops are on Mizuki Shigeru road. When the road was first built, 23 statues of yōkai were there, but by 2014, the number had risen to 153. Mizuki Shigeru kinenkan is a memorial house with exhibits of comics drawn by Mizuki, photos of his trips, an account of his history and many articles about yōkai. Yōkai jinja is a shrine founded to accommodate yōkai. The crest for the shrine symbolizes Chinese character ‘kai’.

=== History ===
Mizuki Shigeru road had a history of 21 years as of 2014. Sakaiminato prospered by the marine products industry. To add culture, Mizuki Shigeru road was made in 1993. In 2000, yōkai jinja was founded on the road, and in 2003, Mizuki Shigeru kinenkan was made. In 2008 over 10 million people visited this road .

=== Events ===
Events include Sakaiminato sakana, a yōkai walk. Another event is GeGeGe no getatumi taikai, in which the participants compete by the number of Getas they amass. The higher-ranking prize winners receive a prize.

== Yōkai Street, Kyoto ==
In Yōkai Street, many cute and humorous yōkai appear. Yōkai Street is at Taishōgun in Kyōto. This is a development project. Many yōkai dolls are displayed in storefronts. When events are held, many people participate.

=== History ===
Yōkai Street is the nickname of the Taishōgun Shopping Arcade (in the Taishōgun district, named after Daishōgunhachi Shrine), which began the yōkai theme project in 2005, installing human-sized figures of these apparitions. Yōkai Street pays homage to the olden belief dating back to the Heian period (10–12th cent.) that the “hyakki yagyō” ("nightly parade of a hundred oni", i.e., many yōkai) used to parade through Ichijō Street, which the shopping arcade is a portion of. Legend says the yōkai in the parade were what became of old tools that suffered being discarded. (Note: As depicted in a later picture scroll Hyakki yagyō emaki attributed to Tosa Mitsunobu (16th cent.).) That is to say, a tool used a long time (tsukumo (九十九) or 99 years) were said to evolve into spirits called tsukumogami (付喪神).

=== Yōkai statues and yōkai food ===
Yōkai Street is usually quiet, but many kind of yokai welcome visitors. Various stores and handmade yōkai are placed in front of stores. In front of the bakery is “the old man of bread.” In front of the kimono shop is a bakeneko dressed in a kimono. One local dish is Yōkai Ramen, a Chinese noodle soup. It is the black and powdered in red. In front of this restaurant is a one-eyed goblin. Other food served there is a yōkai croquette. The color is black and the inside is green. These foods are popular despite their strange appearance.

=== Events ===
At the Taishōgunhachi Shrine on Yōkai Street, a Yōkai Free Market is held several times a year. This market is usually well attended and full of people buying and selling yōkai-related goods. Another event is “Ichijō Hyakkiyakō,” a costume parade in which many people wear yōkai costumes and walk along Ichijō Street at night.

== Yōkaichi, Shiga ==
Yōkaichi city, which is in Shiga prefecture, has become prosperous by publicizing yōkai. Honaikai is an attempt to recover local history through events related to yōkai.

=== History ===
Yōkaichi, Shiga city, which is now Higashiōmi, Shiga city, was named in the Asuka period by Prince Shōtoku. The name Yōkaichi derives from the market which was held on days including 8 (8th, 18th, 28th) in Asuka period. Yōkaichi prospered as a market town and in 2005 merged with four other towns to form Higashiōmi, Shiga.

=== Development ===
Honaikai took a leading part in the development of yōkai culture in Yōkaichi city, starting in 1999. In 2002, "Honaikai" made the map of mysterious yōkai places for the first time. In 2007, Honaikai made a map called the "Prince Shōtoku series" which introduced twelve shrines and temples related to Prince Shōtoku. Seven maps related to raccoon dogs, foxes, and the legend of a long-nosed goblin were created. Honaikai especially focuses on Gao, a ghost that eats mischievous children. Members of Honaikai disguise themselves as Gao on February 3 and visit children.

=== Festivals ===
Festivals related to yōkai or the history of Yōkaichi are held there. "Yōkaichi ha Yōkaichi" is held mainly by "Honaikai" to inform people of the history and to advance yōkai culture. A parade with ghosts and a haunted house is held.

The "Yōkaichi Shōtoku Maturi" is a festival during which a night market is held and people enjoy dancing.

== See also ==
- List of reportedly haunted locations in Japan
- Mayoiga
