= Chunithm =

Rhythm game series

CHUNITHM
- Logo of Chunithm
- Developers: Sega (2015-2023); Sega Fave (2023–present)
- Publishers: Sega (2015–2023); Sega Fave (2023–present); Konami Amusement
- Director: Masaru Kohayakawa
- Engine: teaGfx
- Platform: Arcade
- Release: CHUNITHM: JP: July 16, 2015; CHUNITHM PLUS: JP: February 4, 2016; AIR: JP: August 25, 2016; AIR PLUS: JP: February 9, 2017; STAR: JP: August 24, 2017; STAR PLUS: JP: March 8, 2018; SUPERSTAR: WW: November 26, 2020; SUPERSTAR PLUS: WW: September 2, 2021; AMAZON: JP: October 25, 2018; AMAZON PLUS: JP: April 11, 2019; CRYSTAL: JP: October 24, 2019; CRYSTAL PLUS: JP: July 16, 2020; PARADISE: JP: January 21, 2021; PARADISE LOST: JP: May 13, 2021; NEW: JP: November 4, 2021; WW: March 3, 2022; CHN: September 8, 2022; NEW PLUS: JP: April 14, 2022; WW: August 18, 2022; SUN: JP: October 13, 2022; WW: March 2, 2023; SUN PLUS: JP: May 11, 2023; WW: September 28, 2023; LUMINOUS: JP: December 14, 2023; WW: March 21, 2024; LUMINOUS PLUS: JP: June 20, 2024; WW: October 17, 2024; VERSE: JP: December 12, 2024; WW: April 17, 2025; X-VERSE: JP: July 16, 2025; WW: November 20, 2025; X-VERSE-X: JP: December 11, 2025; WW: April 16, 2026; Mate: JP: July 2, 2026; WW: October 22, 2026
- Genre: Rhythm game
- Modes: Single-player, multiplayer (up to 4 players via cabinet-to-cabinet play)
- Arcade system: Nu (original to Paradise Lost, except Superstar and Superstar Plus); ALLS (Superstar, Superstar Plus, NEW & above)

Chunithm (Note: Japanese: チュウニズム, Hepburn: Chūnizumu) (stylized in all caps) is an arcade rhythm game developed and published by Sega. It was first seen in select Japanese arcades in November 2014, as part of a location test and was officially released on July 16, 2015. The game's title of Chunithm is a portmanteau of "chūnibyō" and "rhythm".

== Gameplay ==
Demonstration of the interface and gameplay of Chunithm. Players hit notes that come from the screen, requiring sliding the controller or lifting and lowering their hands to hit notes.

Chunithm's gameplay consists of using the sliding controller to tap, hold, slide and flick notes that scroll down from the top of the screen, and the sensor bars on the sides of the cabinet to hit notes in the air by raising and lowering the arms. Each note is judged separately from highest to lowest accuracy as Justice Critical, Justice, Attack or Miss, and awards the player with corresponding points that accumulate up to 1,010,000 points, the maximum score for a level. Independent from the score, a gauge fills up when player successfully hits notes, and depletes when missing notes. The level is cleared if the gauge is filled up to a specified amount at the end of the song; and the game gives the player respective ranks based on the total score.

Chunithm maintains a catalog of songs ranging from licensed Japanese pop music and Vocaloid music to original music commissioned for the game. Each song contains four difficulties (Basic, Advanced, Expert and Master), with select music receiving an even harder Ultima difficulty. The game also maintains a separate collection of unconventional, gimmicky or meme levels known as World's End levels that feature a new type of note which the player must not hit in order to score. The player may play three tracks per credit, either solo or joining a multiplayer session of up to four players via local network. In the International and Chinese builds of the game, joining a multiplayer session grants the player a fourth track to play.

Players may save their progress using an Aime card, or other cards compatible with the Amusement IC system from other cards like e-amusement. A companion website, Chunithm-Net, allows registered players to track the scores, customize profiles, forming teams and adjust gameplay settings on the website.

== International Releases ==
The first version of Chunithm released outside of Japan, "CHUNITHM SUPERSTAR", was released in November 2020. "CHUNITHM SUPERSTAR" is based on "CHUNITHM STAR" that was released back in 2017.

"CHUNITHM SUPERSTAR PLUS" was released on September 2, 2021, via an online update. This new version added the following to the game:

- Course Mode
- WORLD'S END

CHUNITHM NEW International Version was released in March 2022. Due to differences with the Japanese version, data will still be separated.

The launch dates, its countries/areas, and the version first released in these countries/areas are:

- Singapore: November 26, 2020 (CHUNITHM SUPERSTAR)
- Taiwan: November 27, 2020 (CHUNITHM SUPERSTAR)
- Hong Kong: December 2, 2020 (CHUNITHM SUPERSTAR)
- Macau: December 3, 2020 (CHUNITHM SUPERSTAR)
- Korea: December 9, 2020 (CHUNITHM SUPERSTAR)
- Australia: February 2, 2021 (CHUNITHM SUPERSTAR)
- New Zealand: March 27, 2021 (CHUNITHM SUPERSTAR)
- Thailand: April 3, 2021 (CHUNITHM SUPERSTAR)
- Mainland China: September 8, 2022 (CHUNITHM NEW) (Note: Named 中二节奏NEW in Mainland China.)
- Malaysia: October 12, 2022 (CHUNITHM NEW PLUS)
- Philippines: October 31, 2022 (CHUNITHM NEW PLUS)
- Indonesia: September 16, 2023 (CHUNITHM SUN)

== Gallery ==
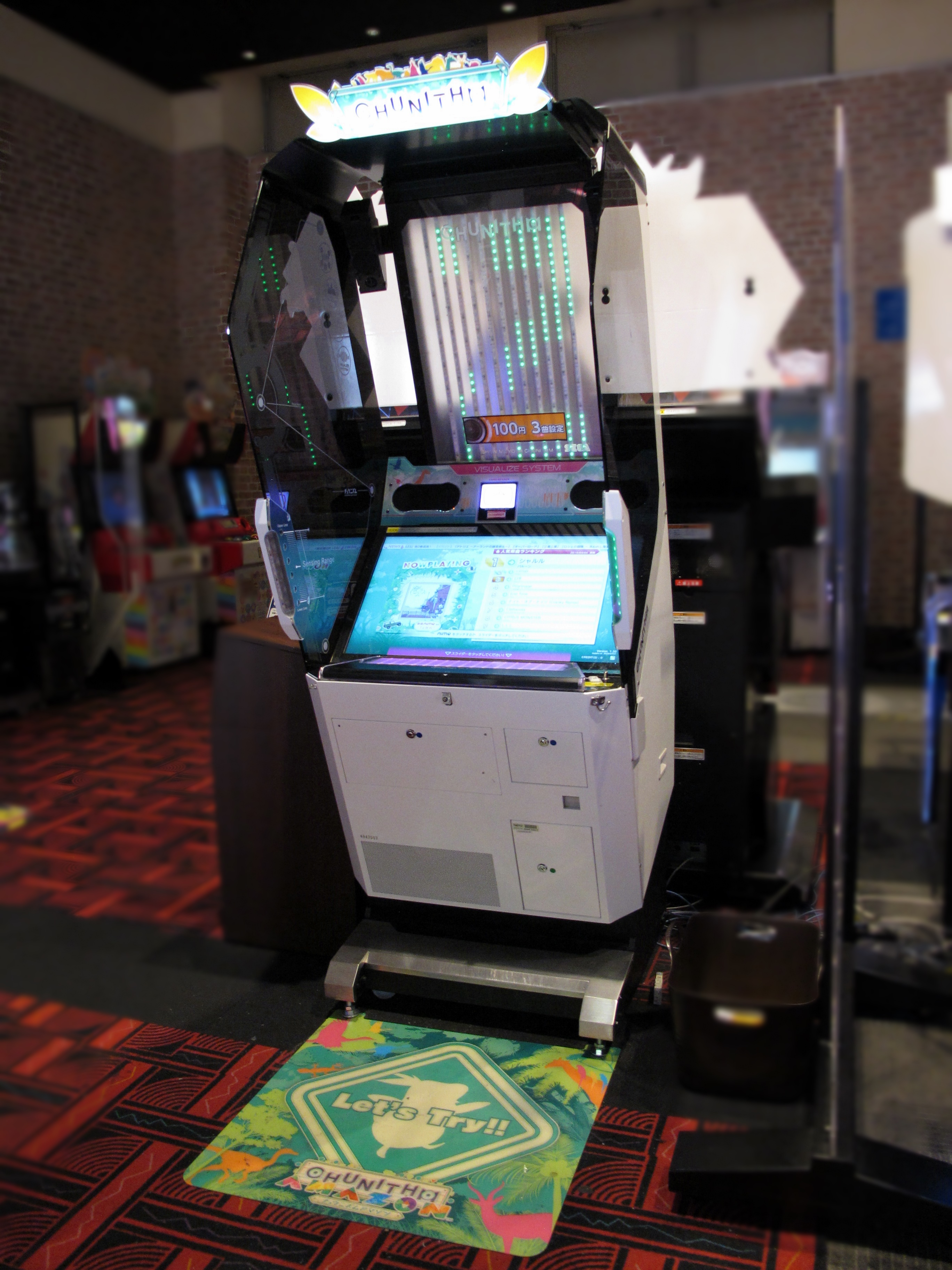
Chunithm Amazon arcade cabinet in Japan, shot in 2019

Decommissioned Chunithm Paradise Lost arcade cabinets from Japan taken offline and exported to the United States

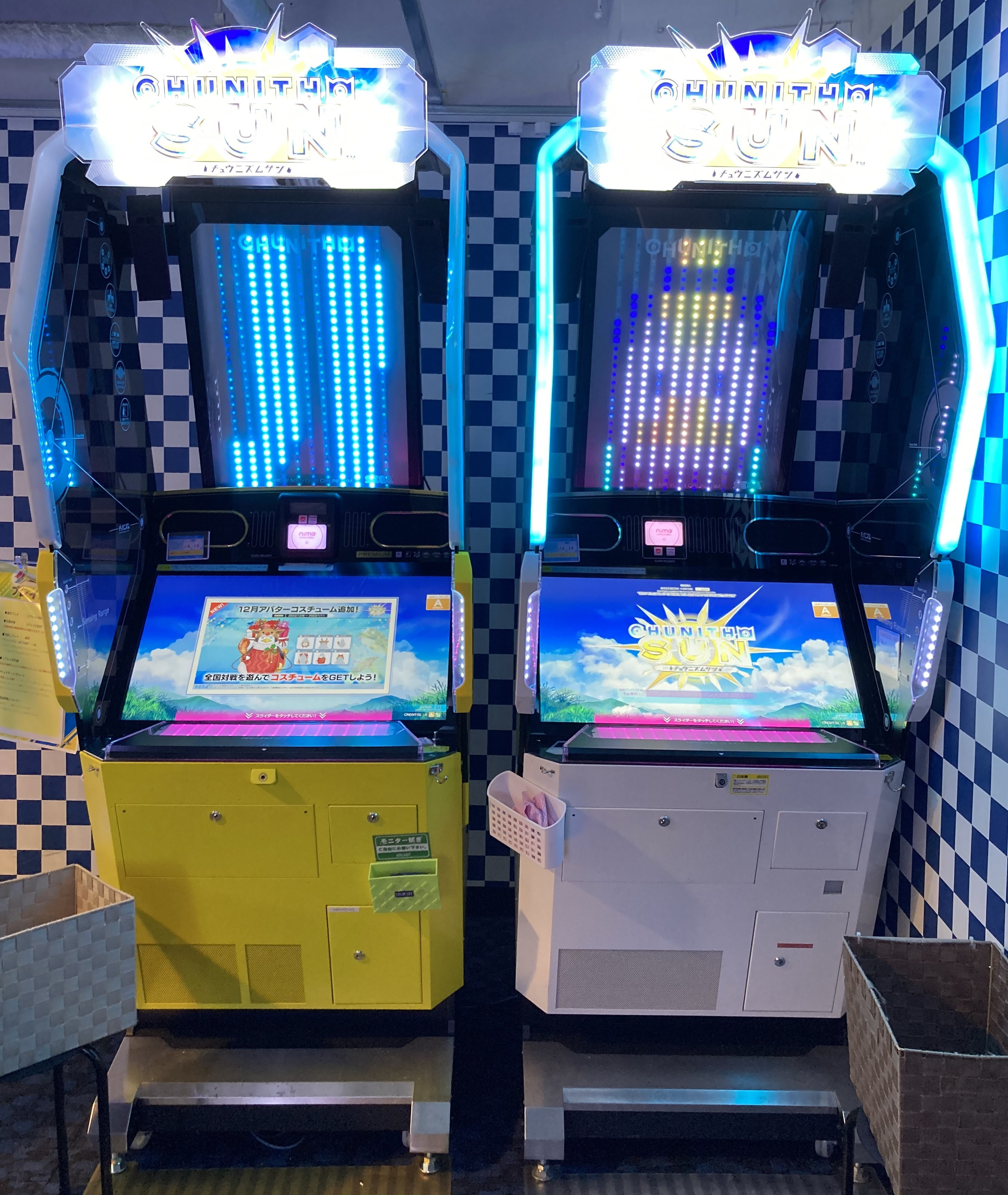
Chunithm Sun arcade game cabinets in Japan (Japan-exclusive new model "gold model" at left, old model "silver model" at right)

Separately named Chunithm 2026 (based on Luminous Plus and Verse) arcade cabinets in China

Chunithm Mate cabinet, the current game version

== Incidents ==
See ALL.Net/Service incidents

== See also ==
- Maimai – another series of arcade rhythm game from the same series.
- Irodorimidori – an in-game band that spawns its own anime adaptation.
