= Sword Art Online: Code Register =

2014 video game

- Developer: Bandai Namco
- Publisher: Kadokawa Corporation
- Series: Sword Art Online
- Platforms: iOS; Android
- Release: JP: November 28, 2014
- Genre: Role-playing
- Mode: Single-player

Sword Art Online: Code Register (ソードアート・オンライン コード・レジスタ), also sometimes known as Sword Art Online: Code Resister, is a 2014 Japanese video game for iOS and Android devices released in Japan only.

== Gameplay ==
Sword Art Online: Code Register is a Japanese role-playing game with a simple tap-and-play battle system. Players can put together groups of characters with different skills and actions to take on opponents and explore different worlds. The game features multiple worlds and characters featured in the franchise, including the eponymous Sword Art Online, ALfheim Online, and Gun Gale Online, as well as original characters.

The game features a "Duel Order System" where players tap characters to make them perform actions against enemies and thus make combos, and utilize the "Switch" system to change the order of attack for better strategies and combos. Similar to the light novel and anime, there exists different kinds of Sword Skills and Unit Skills which players can utilize to deal damage or recover health; with using these different skills and combos is the key to winning the game. There also exists systems to create custom weapons using materials gathered from quests, levelling up skills, and adding abilities.

== Promotion ==
Players who registered early could obtain a special Kirito avatar. A pre-release promotion by Bandai Namco allows registered users to help decide the voice actress for the new original character Sayuki. They are also entered into a lottery where the winner receives a Leafa figure.

Sword Art Online: Code Register featured in a 2015 crossover collaboration with the Tales franchise, with characters from Tales of Link making their way into the game, along with various events and illustrations. "Snow White of Saintly Healing Asuna" and "Gluttonous Reindeer Silica" outfits were available in December 2015 as part of a Christmas promotion, after "Lovely Bride Asuna" and "Pretty Bride Silica" designs in June.

Another 2016 crossover effort features Cross Register and .hack mobile game New World, with Code Register receiving a Black Rose costume and New World receiving Kirito and Asuna costumes and a Yui accessory, amongst other character and equipment cards.

== Reception ==
Geoff Thew of Hardcore Gamer complained about the lack of meaningful user interaction, claiming it "looks as exciting as data entry."
