= List of Kuma Kuma Kuma Bear episodes =

Kuma Kuma Kuma Bear is an anime television series based on the light novel series of the same name written by Kumanano and illustrated by 029. It was announced in the fourteenth volume of the light novel. The series was animated by EMT Squared and directed by Yuu Nobuta, with Takashi Aoshima handling series composition, Yuki Nakano designing the characters, and Shigeo Komori composing the music. Hisashii Ishii served as series director. The series ran for 12 episodes from October 7 to December 23, 2020, on AT-X and other networks. Azumi Waki performed the opening theme "Itsuka no Kioku" (イツカノキオク). Maki Kawase performed the first ending theme "Ano ne." (あのね。; "You Know What.") from Episodes 2–11, while Kawase and Waki also performed the second ending theme "Ano ne. -loved ones ver.-" (あのね。-loved ones ver.-; "You Know What. -loved ones ver.-") for Episode 12.

Funimation acquired the series and streamed it on its website in North America and the British Isles. On January 19, 2021, Funimation announced the series would receive an English dub, which premiered the following day. Following Sony's acquisition of Crunchyroll, the series was moved to Crunchyroll.

On December 23, 2020, when the first season's finale aired, the production of a second season was announced, with the main cast and staff returning from the previous season. Titled Kuma Kuma Kuma Bear Punch!, the season aired from April 3 to June 19, 2023. Azumi Waki performed the opening theme "Kimi to no Mirai" (キミトノミライ), while Maki Kawase performed the ending theme "Zutto" (ずっと).

== Series overview ==
Season	Episodes	Originally released	
Season	Episodes	First released	Last released
1	12	October 7, 2020	December 23, 2020
2	12	April 3, 2023	June 19, 2023

== Episodes ==
=== Season 1: Kuma Kuma Kuma Bear (2020) ===
No.	Title (Note: All English titles are taken from Funimation.)	Directed by	Written by	Original release date
1	"Bear, Appears"; Transliteration: "Kumasan, Tōjō" (Japanese: クマさん、登場)	Futoshi Higashide	Takashi Aoshima	October 7, 2020
A young boy named Kai bursts into the adventurer's guild in the town of Crimonia desperately searching for someone to help his village from a monster known as a black viper. Unfortunately, all the high ranking adventurers are already out doing other quests. When Kai becomes despondent, a girl in a bear outfit named Yuna appears before him and they travel back to Kai's village on her bears. Although, Kai and his father are skeptical of Yuna, she then goes to exterminate the black viper alone and manage to defeat it, revealing that her outfit grants her special powers. The villagers have a party in her honor afterward.
2	"Bear, Meets Little Girl"; Transliteration: "Kumasan, Shōjo to Deau" (Japanese: クマさん、少女と出会う)	Masahiro Takada	Takashi Aoshima	October 14, 2020
Taking place long before the first episode, Yuna enters her favorite game and is asked to choose one treasure box as a gift item based on her total hours of gameplay from the past year and she ends up choosing the Kuma Set. After entering the world of the game, she is shocked to find herself wearing the bear equipment as well as her level going back to level one, which she thinks is a bug until she get a mail from God, stating that she has been sent to another world. After beating the wolf that came to attack her, she ends up saving a girl named Fina. Their story continues until Yuna goes to exterminate a tiger wolf in the forest and ends up saving Fina's life once again from the tiger wolf that came to attack her. Afterwards, Yuna becomes an adventurer in Crimonia after defeating a veteran adventurer named Deborane after he insults her and she and Fina become partners.
3	"Bear, Goes on Rampage"; Transliteration: "Kumasan, Dai Abare Suru" (Japanese: クマさん、大暴れする)	Jun'ichi Kitamura	Takamitsu Kōno	October 21, 2020
At the guild, after Yuna finishes her hunts for Fina, a man named Lanz confronts her for defeating Deborane. Later, together with Lurina, a magician in Deborane's party, Yuna heads off to subdue fifty goblins. However, when they reached the forest, they find out that there are actually a hundred goblins and even a goblin king in the area. Yuna then exterminates both of the goblin horde and the goblin king alone. After finishing the quest, Yuna gains a new skill that allows her to summon her bear familiars with her gloves, which she names Kumakyu and Kumayuru. Afterwards, together with Fina, Yuna rents a plot of land to set up her house that includes a facility for Fina so she can use it for monster harvesting. Meanwhile, it is revealed that a young girl was watching them from behind a tree.
4	"Bear, Meets the Feudal Lord"; Transliteration: "Kumasan, Ryōshu ni Au" (Japanese: クマさん、領主に会う)	Kōki Uchinomiya	Aoi Akashiro	October 28, 2020
Returning to where the first episode left off, Yuna arrives at the guild with the black viper. After the other guild members harvest it, Fina shows up at Yuna's house later that day where she gives her the black viper's mana gem. Yuna then notices that Fina has a cut on her hand and she uses her magic to heal it. The next day, Yuna is summoned to the guild. Receiving a request from Cliff Foschurose, the feudal lord of Crimonia, Yuna reluctantly accepts it due to her perception with nobility. When she arrives at his house, she spends the day hanging out with his young daughter, Noire, and gives Cliff the goblin king's sword. Afterwards, when Yuna heads home, she finds a despondent Fina, who tells her that her mother's illness has gotten worse. At Fina's house, Yuna attempts to heal Telmina with little success. Realizing that she has to use her magic in a different way, Yuna successfully cures Telmina of her illness.
5	"Bear, Raises a Bird (?)"; Transliteration: "Kumasan, Tori (?) o Sodateru" (Japanese: クマさん、鶏（？）を育てる)	Harume Kosaka	Takashi Aoshima	November 4, 2020
After Telmina recovers from her illness, Yuna uses her new Bear Transfer Gate skill to travel to Kai's village in order to get some eggs. The next day, Yuna is out buying lunch when she sees some orphans waiting for leftovers. She then heads to the orphanage where she learns that the feudal lord has stopped supporting them. Yuna decides to help the orphanage by setting up a kokekokko farm so they can sell eggs. She also supplies Telmina with a job as a representative. Sometime later, Yuna calls out Cliff for abandoning the orphanage when he wonders why she will not sell his family any eggs. When Cliff returns home, he finds out that Enz Roland, the administrator of the orphanage, has been embezzling the funds. That night, Cliff confronts and apprehends Enz. At the orphanage, Cliff apologizes for what happened. At her house, Fina comforts Yuna for helping the orphanage when she expresses embarrassment for not trusting Cliff.
6	"Bear, Watches Over the Sisters"; Transliteration: "Kumasan, Shimai o Mimamoru" (Japanese: クマさん、姉妹を見守る)	Natsumi Higashida	Saeka Fujimoto	November 11, 2020
Things appears to be going well after Telmina accepts Gentz's marriage proposal. The next morning, however, Fina tells Yuna that her mother and Gentz had a fight over breakfast. She then asks Yuna if she can take her and Shuri to retrieve the snow crystal flower. The trio heads to the area where the flower is located. During their journey, Shuri is shown to be fearless and highly determined. While they are looking for it, Shuri notices something sparkly. When she discovers that it is a trapped bird, she and Fina rescue it. As the bird flies away, one of its feathers falls into Shuri's hands. When Fina and Shuri show it to their mother and Gentz, they realize that it is the same feather that Roy, the girls' father, had. Fina realizes that Yuna was right when she earlier said that everything would be okay. Later, Fina and Shuri are at Yuna's house where they help her make pudding. The next day, Yuna gives everyone she knows some pudding. While Cliff is enjoying it, he asks Yuna if she can take Noire to the royal capital.
7	"Bear, Goes to Royal Capital"; Transliteration: "Kumasan, Ōto ni Iku" (Japanese: クマさん、王都に行く)	Kōki Uchinomiya	Takamitsu Kōno	November 18, 2020
Yuna and Fina arrive at Cliff's house to escort Noire to the royal capital. As they are traveling, Yuna and Fina reveal to Noire how they met, while Noire reveals that her mother and older sister live in the royal capital. Yuna then decides to stop and rest where she cooks for everyone. The next day, the trio runs into Count Gran Farrengram and his granddaughter Misana. Once everyone arrives at the royal capital, they go their separate ways where Yuna, Fina, and Noire are greeted by Noire's mother, Eleanora. Later that day, Shia arrives at the house. When she becomes skeptical of Yuna, Eleanora proposes that they have a sparring match, which Yuna wins, but this motivates Shia into practicing harder. At dinnertime, Yuna gives Noire, Shia, and Eleanora some pudding. The next morning, Yuna and Fina buy some groceries. That night, Yuna cooks some cheeseburgers and fries for everyone, eventually earning Shia's respect. It is then revealed that some mysterious figures are lurking outside the royal capital.
8	"Bear, Lays to Waste"; Transliteration: "Kumasan, Musō Suru" (Japanese: クマさん、無双する)	Masahiro Takada	Aoi Akashiro	November 25, 2020
In the past, a man swore vengeance against the king. In the present, Yuna gives everyone some pizza. Noire then asks Yuna if she can take Fina and Misana for an errand tomorrow. The next morning, Eleanora shows Yuna around the castle where she meets the princess, Flora. Meanwhile, Noire takes Fina and Misana to pick up some membership cards for the fan club she is creating. That night, a mysterious figure head towards the royal capital. The next day, Yuna, Noire, and Fina find out that people have been attacked in the northern forest. When Noire realizes that her father will arrive in that area, Yuna volunteers to pick him up. Later, the mysterious figure, who is named Gulzam, confronts the king while he is talking to Eleanora. After Gulzam reveals that he has gathered an army of monsters, the king summons Sanya, the master of the adventure's guild. Using her magic, Sanya reports that Yuna has defeated Gulzam and his army. Once Yuna and Cliff reunite, Yuna is summoned by the king. Afterwards, Yuna meets up with Fina and Noire again.
9	"Bear, Opens Shop"; Transliteration: "Kumasan, o Mise o Hiraku" (Japanese: クマさん、お店を開く)	Harume Kosaka	Takamitsu Kōno	December 2, 2020
At the king's birthday celebration, Yuna's pudding is provided to the guests. The next day, Yuna and Fina decide to head to the bakery before they go home. When they arrive there, however, the owners, Morin and Karin, reveal that they are losing it because they borrowed money from a shady place. Later that night, Yuna decides to hire them for a shop she is opening in Crimonia. In Crimonia, Yuna hires Telmina as the manager. Furthermore, when Morin and Karin arrive in town, Yuna reveals that she is turning a noble's mansion into the shop. After employing the orphanage as the staff, Yuna names the shop the Bear Haven, which becomes a huge success. Once the shop closes for the night, Cliff and Noire show up and he reveals that he apprehended the individuals who gave the illegally exorbitant loan for the bakery. When Yuna hands the document to Morin and Karin, they decide to stay in town. This decision puts Yuna in a happy mood.
10	"Bear, Goes to Sea"; Transliteration: "Kumasan, Umi e Iku" (Japanese: クマさん、海へ行く)	Chihiro Kumano	Takashi Aoshima	December 9, 2020
Yuna is heading towards the port town of Millela to eat some seafood when she encounters a couple who has collapsed in the mountains. After she rescues them, Damon and Yuura reveal that they were heading to Crimonia to buy food because the town has been terrorized by a kraken and a band of thieves for a month. Once they arrive in Millela, Yuna decides to help. She then heads to the adventurer's guild where she meets the guildmaster, Atla. While Yuna donates food, Atla reveals that the guild has been busy dealing with all the problems. The next day, the town has plenty of food again thanks to Yuna. Yuna and Atla later have a conversation about the kraken. That night, Yuna deals with two intruders, who are a part of the band of thieves. She then heads to the thieves' hideout to take out the remaining members.
11	"Bear, Fights Squid (?)"; Transliteration: "Kumasan, Ika (?) to Tatakau" (Japanese: クマさん、烏賊（？）と戦う)	Hisashi Imokubo	Aoi Akashiro	December 16, 2020
A tired Yuna brings the thieves to Atla where she questions the leader. Meanwhile, when Zarrad, the guildmaster of the merchant guild and whom the thieves are working for, learns that the thieves have been captured, he attempts to skip town with stolen valuables until he is apprehended by Yuna and Atla. Afterwards, Yuna heads to the restaurant and she cries tears of joy when she eats a Japanese meal. She then decides to take on the kraken when she discovers that the restaurant will get more ingredients from the country of Wa. Yuna struggles to come up with a viable strategy to fight the kraken. Yuura later invites Yuna to her house as thanks for saving her and Damon. While she is eating, Yuna figures out how to deal with the kraken. With Atla's help, Yuna corners the kraken. She then uses her fire magic to finally defeat it. After this happens, Atla carries an exhausted Yuna.
12	"Miss Bear and Fina"; Transliteration: "Kumasan to Fina" (Japanese: クマさんとフィナ)	Jun'ichi Kitamura	Takashi Aoshima	December 23, 2020
As the kraken's dead body is being cooked, Yuna is enjoying the feast Ans has prepared when Atla shows up to ask Yuna to take on a request. Sometime later, Yuna returns to Crimonia where she tells Fina that she has to do something. At Cliff's house, Yuna gives Cliff a letter from Millela asking to be under the wing of Crimonia. When Cliff expresses concern, Yuna reveals she dug a tunnel. The next day, Yuna, Cliff, and Milaine arrive in Millela. Afterwards, Yuna takes Fina and Shuri to see the ocean. However, Fina notices that she and Yuna are slowly drifting apart thanks to Yuna's job and popularity. As such, Fina asks Yuna if she can takes a break from harvesting. The next morning, Yuna hangs out with Noire while Fina is training with Gentz. Thanks to Noire and Gentz, Yuna and Fina realize how much they miss each other. When they meet up, Yuna and Fina vow to be together.

=== Season 2: Kuma Kuma Kuma Bear Punch! (2023) ===
No.	Title (Note: All English titles are taken from Crunchyroll.)	Directed by	Written by	Original release date
1	"Bear Comes Home"; Transliteration: "Kaettekita Kumasan" (Japanese: 帰ってきたクマさん)	Harume Kosaka	Takashi Aoshima	April 3, 2023
Yuna is at the Bear Haven when Telmina tells her there is a problem with the honey supply. According to Helen at the Adventurers' Guild, a horde of orcs have set camp around the source of the honey: the Bee Tree. Yuna goes to see it for herself and sees actual bears being attacked by some orcs. When Kumakyu and Kumayuru plead with Yuna to save them, she intervenes and defeat the orcs, and then heals the injured bears. Yuna asks the two cubs to stay away from humans who have gather the honey, but instead they seemingly allows her to take some honey. Rem, the keeper of the Bee Tree, overhears Yuna and Helen talk, and expresses his concern over the bears. He also mentions Cliff is responsible for the Bee Tree. Yuna tells Rem and Helen to mention her name to Cliff about protecting the bears as a favor. Later, Cliff himself comes to the restaurant with Noire and requests Yuna to visit the royal capital again, not only to visit Princess Flora and help create copies of the picture books that she created, but also listen to Ellalaura's request: escort students from the royal academy on a training mission. While she tries to refuse, she ultimately accepts it after learning that Shia is in the group.
2	"Bear, Watching Over Students"; Transliteration: "Kumasan, Gakusei o Mimamoru" (Japanese: クマさん、学生を見守る)	Hisashi Ishii	Takashi Aoshima	April 10, 2023
Yuna is briefed on her tasks regarding escorting some students from the royal academy. Ellalaura brings Yuna to the academy to meet the students under her care: Marix, Timol, Cattleya, and Shia. The headmaster expresses his doubts, but decides to trust Ellalaura. During the escort, Marix and Timol are condescending towards Yuna; mistaking her for a rich kid pretending to be an adventurer, while Cattleya starts to bond with her. The group experiences trouble during the first rest stop. Yuna is aware of this through Kumakyu and Kumayuru. When Yuna informs Shia about five goblins ahead of the carriage, Shia convinces to inform the others of the danger. While Marix is doubtful, he braces for battle just in case. When the group defeats the goblins easily, Yuna notices that something is wrong. Marix thanks Yuna's bears for their help, but remains skeptical of her. The group reach the village, make their flour deliveries, and rest. Cattleya reveals that she knows Yuna and Shia are friends due to being familiar with each other. As Yuna talks to Fina via the bear phone, they are unaware of the danger that lurks outside the village.
3	"Bear, Surprising All"; Transliteration: "Kumasan, Odorokaseru" (Japanese: クマさん、驚かせる)	Yoshihiko Iwata	Takashi Aoshima	April 17, 2023
While visiting a fabric factory, an employee named Garan informs everyone of a goblin attack, which is threatening a Silkworm nest. Yuna and the students decide to help. The group then rush to defeat the goblins, who are trying to break into a shed that a group of people are hiding in. After defeating them all, a black tiger attacks them, who was also threatening the goblins. Marix and Timol try to hold it back to save the others, but Yuna, realizing of the other black tigers in the area, goes to confront their leader despite Marix's protests. After Yuna easily defeats them all, Marix is left stunned by how powerful she is. Once the black tigers are defeated, they goes to check on the silkworms, which are actually large insects, which scares Yuna. Sometime later, Marix and Timol both apologize to Yuna for their behavior towards her. After the group return to the royal academy, they meet up with three other adventurers: Jiguldo, Jaden, and Mel, the latter two having known Yuna. When Jiguldo is skeptical of Yuna, the others come to her defense. The students then show their newfound respect for Yuna as she returns home to tell her story to Fina.
4	"Bear, Guiding the Young Girl"; Transliteration: "Kumasan, Shōjo o Michibiku" (Japanese: クマさん、少女を導く)	Masateru Nomi	Saeka Fujimoto	April 24, 2023
At the orphanage, a young girl named Sherry is busy making a cushion for Yuna. Meanwhile, Yuna is excited to learn the Anz is on her way to Crimonia to open a restaurant. While visiting the orphanage, Sherry approaches Yuna and gives her the now-finished cushion. After Anz and her friends arrive, they meet Yuna in the orphanage and then go to visit the Bear Restaurant. Yuna then shows them the building that will both serve as their restaurant and home, naming it the Bear Diner. Milaine then arrives and presents them with bear outfits to wear for their jobs, which Anz and most of her friends find embarrassing. Remembering Sherry's cushion, Yuna brings Sherry to a tailor's shop run by Nahru and her husband Temocca to request for aprons based on the designs of Sherry's cushion. Sherry decides to work at the shop, but begins to worry about leaving the orphanage behind. After the Bear Diner opens, Yuna goes to convince Sherry to tell the other children, who respect her decision to work at the tailor's shop. Yuna then visits the Bear Diner, the orphanage, and the tailor's shop and sees that everyone is doing fine.
5	"Bear, Seeking Mithril"; Transliteration: "Kumasan, Misuriru o Motomete" (Japanese: クマさん、ミスリルを求めて)	Seo Hye-Jin	Aoi Akashiro	May 1, 2023
Fina is tasked with harvesting a black tiger, but her iron knife is not sharp enough to pierce its tough skin. Visiting a smithy, they learn from the owners, Gold and his wife Nelt, that a steel or mithril knife is stronger than an iron knife. Although Fina suggests a steel knife, Yuna instead wants a mithril knife, but the smithy doesn't have any mithril. They are advised to go to the royal capital to meet a dwarf named Ghazal. They meet up with Shia and her classmates at one point. Upon meeting Ghazal, they learn that there isn't much mithril now due to the nearby mine being shut down. At the adventurers' guild, they face off against some tough adventurers after they antagonize them, but it is stopped by Sanya (revealed to be the Guild Master), who forbids everyone at the guild from threatening Yuna. Ellalaura also comes to visit to talk about the mine, to which they learn that golems have been blocking off access and that no one has been able to defeat them. Yuna decides to take care of them and sets off to the town near the mines, where she meets Jaden and Mel again, who are accompanied by two other adventurers named Toya and Senia, and are also hunting for golems. While at an inn, Mel wishes for Yuna to sleep with her, making Yuna uncomfortable. A group of five adventurers arrive and insult Yuna, angering her. Meanwhile, Fina is given a new outfit by Shia, Ellalaura, and Surilina.
6	"Bear, Becoming the Hero (?)"; Transliteration: "Kumasan, Yūsha (?) ni Naru" (Japanese: クマさん、勇者（？）になる)	Harume Kosaka	Aoi Akashiro	May 8, 2023
After a nightmare, Yuna prepares to go to the mines with Mel's group. While fighting golems, they encounter the same group from before, who are struggling to defeat a mithril golem. Barbould, their leader, refuses their help, and both groups are forced to retreat. After having a second nightmare, Yuna goes to confront the golem herself and lures it through a bear gate that takes it to a cliffside. She defeats it by throwing it into the air and letting it plummet down. Afterwards, she discovers two strange stones before receiving a message from God stating that it is a gift. She then explains her success to both groups, but Barbould doesn't believe her and she electrocutes him after he insults her. Meanwhile, Ellalaura brings Fina to the castle for a visit, but she does not feel so comfortable about it. Upon meeting Forot and Flora, she learns that Yuna has been spending time with Flora more than Forot. She embarrasses herself after staining her dress, but the royals accept that it was an accident.
7	"Bear, Getting Lectured"; Transliteration: "Kumasan, Shikarareru" (Japanese: クマさん、叱られる)	Naoya Murakawa	Takashi Aoshima	May 15, 2023
After proving that she defeated all the golems, she keeps her message from God a secret from them. Barbould invites her to join his party, but she declines. After delivering her report to Sanya, she heads to the castle to reunite with Fina and is given a knife as a gift from Ellalaura. They deliver the mithril golem to Ghazal so he can make them what they need. Ghazal does not know anything about the stones that Yuna found. They later meet a girl named Nerin waiting outside of the closed bakery that was formerly owned by Morin and Karin, who are revealed to be her relatives; Yuna directs them to where they are now. When Shuri hopes to help Fina with her work, Fina finally unleashes her anger on Yuna for her unwise decisions and not listening to her earlier. To make it up to her, Yuna makes shortcakes before Fina comes to apologize for her outburst. Yuna then shares her shortcake with her and Shuri. As Fina starts harvesting the black tiger at the guild, Shuri also tries to help with a mithril knife that Yuna gave her, leading Telmina to scold her for giving Shuri something that's dangerous and expensive. Yuna pacifies her with shortcake and promises the family more cake later.
8	"Bear, Studying Black Tea"; Transliteration: "Kumasan, Kōcha o Manabu" (Japanese: クマさん、紅茶を学ぶ)	Hisashi Ishii	Saeka Fujimoto	May 22, 2023
Fina and her family travel to the Bear Haven to have more shortcakes, where they meet up with Yuna, Morin, Karin, and Nerin. Yuna agrees to hire Nerin when she offers to help make shortcakes for the restaurant. They then visit Noire to share shortcakes with her and Lala. They decide to make tea for the restaurant as well, but Nerin is not willing to go to the castle so she can learn how to make it. They decide to learn how to make tea from Lala themselves. They eventually succeed and later that evening, Nerin is given a bear outfit to wear for her job. Yuna soon receives her mithril knives from Ghazal and tests them out on a golem dummy. Yuna later goes to visit Flora and her mother Kitia. She also meets the castle's chef Zelef and after becoming interested in the pudding and shortcakes that she made, Yuna agrees to provide him with the recipes and is rewarded with a feast.
9	"Bear, Knowing of Nobles"; Transliteration: "Kumasan, Kizoku o Shiru" (Japanese: クマさん、貴族を知る)	Seo Hye-Jin	Takashi Aoshima	May 29, 2023
While exercising to lose weight from eating shortcakes, Yuna learns from Fina of a letter that they each received from Misa, who is inviting them to a party. Fina is nervous about the idea, so they decide to go ask Noire and Cliff for advice. As Noire goes to prepare a dress for Fina, Cliff advices Yuna to make a gift for Misa and she has Sherry create a stuffed animal based on her bears, but also plans to make more stuffed bears for the orphanage. Next, Yuna and Fina decide to also create a big shortcake for Misa too. Shuri is disappointed that she doesn't get to go to the party, but is convinced not to by Fina for her safety. Using horses, Cliff also goes to attend the party with two guards: Rabon and Gouges, while Noire, Fina, and Yuna travel there on Yuna's bears. They stop in a forest to rest for the night via a Bear House made by Yuna. The next day, Yuna saves a family from a goblin attack. The father reveals that he is a merchant and knows about Yuna. Upon reaching Sheelia, Yuna is stared at by the locals. Once they reach Misa's house, they are greeted by a maid named Meishun. Misa then comes out to greet them.
10	"Bear, Getting Motivated"; Transliteration: "Kumasan, Yaruki ni Naru" (Japanese: クマさん、やる気になる)	Harume Kosaka	Takashi Aoshima	June 5, 2023
As the party begins, Yuna takes Noire, Fran, and Misa out for a walk where they have a nasty encounter with a spoiled noble named Randle, his friends, and his demonic bodyguard Brad, but have to retreat to avoid unwanted attention. Yuna learns from Gran and Cliff that Randle is from the Salbard family, who control half of the city and are fighting for full control of it; the party is meant to help Gran maintain support of the kingdom. After Botts, the head chef, is injured, Cliff sends Rabon and Gouges to get a replacement chef, but are attacked and prevented from going any further, leading Yuna to suspect that the Salbards are responsible for the attack and for Botts' injury. Misa then begins to blame herself for the others getting hurt, but Yuna convinces her otherwise. She then uses a Bear Gate to return to the royal capital to request help from King Forot and his subordinates: the prime minister Zang and his heir Ernat. They decide to send Zelef to help.
11	"Bear, Going Bare"; Transliteration: "Kumasan, Kuma o Nugu" (Japanese: クマさん、クマを脱ぐ)	Naoya Murakawa	Takashi Aoshima	June 12, 2023
Yuna and Zelef arrive just in time to help Botts. Meanwhile, Brad, Randle, and his father Gajurdo attend the party in hopes that it will be a failure, expecting the food to taste bad. To their surprise, the food tastes great, so Gajurdo and his subordinates decide to cause a ruckus by falsely claiming that the food still tastes bad, but Zelef stands up to them and tricks them into revealing their scheme. As a result, Gajurdo and his men are forced to stop their protesting and they leave humiliated. Gajurdo is outraged that his plan failed. When Randle proposes executing their enemies, Gajurdo is against it, forcing Randle to secretly take matters in his own hands. Later, Fina and Misa force Yuna to change into a dress, making everyone see her without her bear suit for the first time, although she still wears her bear gloves and shoes so that she is not completely powerless. The party then continues.
12	"Tale of a Bear"; Transliteration: "Kumasan no Monogatari" (Japanese: クマさんのものがたり)	Hisashi Ishii	Takashi Aoshima	June 19, 2023
While Misa, Noire, and Fina are left alone, they are ambushed by Brad, but not before Fina calls Yuna for help. She returns to find Noire and Fina injured and Misa kidnapped. Misa is then locked in a cell along with other kidnapped children by Randle and Brad, who are using them to blackmail families that oppose them. Gajurdo is outraged by his son's reckless actions, but their mansion is then attacked by Yuna. Randle recognizes her and realizes that Brad didn't completely cover his tracks. Yuna's bears fight Gajurdo's men while Yuna fights Brad one on one. Although Brad proves to be a strong fighter, he is eventually beaten. Randle then tries to force Yuna to surrender by threatening Misa, but fails when Yuna pummels him by surprise. Ellalaura arrives and has Gajurdo, Randle, and Brad arrested for their crimes and orders the guards to search the house for evidence of their guilt and rescue the other captured children. With that, Gajurdo gets the death penalty, while Randle is stripped of all his titles and banished, putting the Salbard family out of power. The group then head back to the castle, where everyone is grateful for Yuna's heroics. Afterwards, Misa's father becomes the new feudal lord ruling all of Sheelia after Gran retires. Yuna and her friends then return to Crimonia. The end credits then reveal the fate of all the characters that Yuna befriended, followed by Yuna and Fina returning to the Bear House.
