= Hitomi Kikuchi =

Japanese voice actress

- 菊地 瞳
- Born: June 13, 1987 (age 39); Shizuoka Prefecture, Japan
- Education: Ritsumeikan University
- Occupation: Voice actress
- Years active: 2011–present
- Agent: Aksent
- Known for: High School Fleet as Michiru Takeda; Pokémon the Series: Sun & Moon as Lana

Hitomi Kikuchi (菊地 瞳, Kikuchi Hitomi; born June 13, 1987) is a Japanese voice actress from Shizuoka Prefecture who is affiliated with Aksent. She is known for her roles as Michiru Takeda in High School Fleet and Lana in Pokémon the Series: Sun & Moon.

== Filmography ==
=== Anime ===
2013

- Concrete Revolutio as Chinatsu (episodes 1–2, 11–2), Saki (episode 8)

2016

- Show by Rock!! as Maid (episode 2)
- High School Fleet as Michiru Takeda
- Pokémon the Series: Sun & Moon as Lana
- Macross Delta as Lydie LeGrand

2019

- Why the Hell Are You Here, Teacher!? as Rei Suzuki

2020

- Pokémon Journeys: The Series as Lana (Episodes 37 and 112)

=== Films ===
2020

- High School Fleet: The Movie as Michiru Takeda
