= Chiisai Oyaji Nikki =

Japanese manga and television series

- Cover of the first manga volume

ちいさいおやじ日記
- Manga
- Written by: Noi Asano
- Published by: Ohzora Shuppan
- Original run: 19 March 2008 – 23 July 2008
- Volumes: 2
- Anime television series

Chiisana Ojisan
- Directed by: Noi Asano
- Studio: Kachidoki Studio
- Original network: Chiba TV
- Original run: October 1, 2012 – 2013
- Episodes: 30

Chiisai Oyaji Nikki (ちいさいおやじ日記; "Little Old Man Diary") is a Japanese manga series written and illustrated by Noi Asano. It has been adapted into an anime television series. Directed by Asano himself, it consisted of thirty 30-second episodes that were compiled into a DVD released on April 25, 2014. The animated series was a jury selection during the 17th Japan Media Arts Festival Awards.

== Characters ==
- Chiisana Ojisan

Voiced by: Chō

- "Watashi"

Voiced by: Nozomi Furuki
