= Jinsei =

Japanese light novel series

- First light novel volume cover, featuring Rino Endō

人生
- Genre: Comedy, slice of life
- Light novel
- Written by: Ougyo Kawagishi
- Illustrated by: Meruchi Nanase
- Published by: Shogakukan
- Imprint: Gagaga Bunko
- Original run: January 18, 2012 – March 18, 2015
- Volumes: 10
- Manga
- Written by: Ougyo Kawagishi
- Illustrated by: Seiji Matsuyama
- Published by: Shogakukan
- Imprint: Sunday GX Comics
- Magazine: Monthly Sunday Gene-X
- Original run: February 19, 2014 – March 19, 2015
- Volumes: 3
- Anime television series
- Directed by: Keiichiro Kawaguchi
- Written by: Naruhisa Arakawa
- Studio: Feel (Note: Production assistance (制作協力) for all episodes provided by Millepensee.)
- Licensed by: NA: Crunchyroll
- Original network: Tokyo MX, ytv, CTV, BS11, AT-X
- Original run: July 6, 2014 – September 28, 2014
- Episodes: 13

Jinsei (人生; literally "(Human) Life"), subtitled La Bonne Vie (The Good Life in French), is a Japanese light novel series written by Ougyo Kawagishi and illustrated by Meruchi Nanase. Ten volumes were published by Shogakukan from January 2012 to March 2015 under their Gagaga Bunko imprint. A manga adaptation was serialized in Shogakukan's Monthly Sunday Gene-X magazine from February 2014 to March 2015, and was collected into three tankōbon volumes. An anime television series adaptation by Feel aired from July to September 2014 under the title Life Counselling TV Animation "Jinsei" (人生相談テレビアニメーション「人生」, Jinsei Sōdan Terebi Animēshon "Jinsei"). Funimation licensed the series under the English title Jinsei - Life Consulting.

== Characters ==
=== 2nd Journalism Club ===
Yūki Akamatsu (赤松 勇樹, Akamatsu Yūki)
Voiced by: Yasuaki Takumi
The main character. A boy with glasses that usually ends up as the straight man when dealing with his club mates at the Life counseling section. He got involved with the club when the president of the journalism club, Ayaka Nikaido, convinced him to join as a way of improving his social interactions.
Rino Endō (遠藤 梨乃, Endō Rino)
Voiced by: Hiyori Nitta
A girl with glasses and member of the science club. She is very proud of her scientific knowledge, doesn't like irrational behaviors and tends to give her opinions based on science. She frequently ends up in awkward situations with Yūki (mostly thanks to Ikumi) and seems to have feelings for him, but refuses to acknowledge it. Yūki is not completely unaware of her feelings, and seems to reciprocate them in secret.
Fumi Kujō (九条 ふみ, Kujō Fumi)
Voiced by: Moe Toyota
A member of the literature club, she is a sweet and cultured girl, but tends to over think when giving her opinions at counseling. Ikumi usually tries to grope her large bust. She comes from a wealthy and distinguished family. She has trouble speaking to her old fashioned and strict grandfather.
Ikumi Suzuki (鈴木 いくみ, Suzuki Ikumi)
Voiced by: Ayaka Suwa
A very energetic girl coming from the sports club. She gives the most physical and less deeply thought counseling of the club, but sometimes her counseling complements the other's. She usually tries to pair Rino with Yuki, but frequently ends up causing awkward situations between the two. She seems to be a bit perverted, as she has groped Fumi's large bust on one occasion. She always wears spats under her skirt.
Ayaka Nikaidō (二階堂 彩香, Nikaidō Ayaka)
Voiced by: Rena Maeda
The president of the journalism club and a relative of Yūki. She convinced Yūki of directing the Life counseling section as thanks for helping her keeping her club open. She also seems aware of Rino's feelings towards Yuki.
Emi Murakami (村上 絵美, Murakami Emi)
Voiced by: Saori Ōnishi
A girl with pink hair that is the Arts club president. After her club is cancelled because of the lack of members and bonding with Ikumi, she decides to join the Life counseling section as a consultant. She tends to get overly excited when asked to paint something.

=== Other ===
Kouta Asano (浅野 浩太, Asano Kōta)
Voiced by: Showtaro Morikubo
The President of the 1st Division newspaper who creates his own life counseling section in order to force Ayaka join his club. A very narcissistic person who hired students that have similar personalities (but not the same knowledges) as counterparts of the members of the 2nd Division club. After being defeated in a counseling contest with the 2nd Division, he agrees on shutting down his counseling section, but his perversion remains.
Kumi (くみ)
Voiced by: Hitomi Harada
Fumi's counterpart who, just like her has large breasts.
Shino (志乃)
Voiced by: Mai Fuchigami
Rino's counterpart who is also sharp-tonged.
Yoshitaka (よしたか)
Voiced by: Hisayoshi Suganuma
Ikumi's counterpart (and only male counterpart) who is also hyperactive and short.

== Media ==
=== Light novels ===
The first light novel volume was published on January 18, 2012, by Shogakukan under their Gagaga Bunko imprint. The tenth and final volume was published on March 18, 2015.

No.	Japanese release date	Japanese ISBN
1	January 18, 2012	978-4-09-451318-9
2	April 18, 2012	978-4-09-451335-6
3	August 21, 2012	978-4-09-451359-2
4	December 18, 2012	978-4-09-451382-0
5	May 17, 2013	978-4-09-451412-4
6	November 19, 2013	978-4-09-451449-0
7	February 18, 2014	978-4-09-451467-4
8	June 18, 2014	978-4-09-451493-3
9	October 17, 2014	978-4-09-451516-9
10	March 18, 2015	978-4-09-451541-1

=== Anime ===
A 13-episode anime television series adaptation by Feel aired from July 6 to September 28, 2014.

==== Episodes ====
No.	Title	Original release date
1	"Counseling"; Transliteration: "Sōdan" (Japanese: 相談)	July 6, 2014
2	"Reflections"; Transliteration: "Hansei" (Japanese: 反省)	July 13, 2014
3	"Capital"; Transliteration: "Shihon" (Japanese: 資本)	July 20, 2014
4	"Summer Things"; Transliteration: "Natsumono" (Japanese: 夏物)	July 27, 2014
5	"Short"; Transliteration: "Tanjaku" (Japanese: 短尺)	August 3, 2014
6	"Iida"; Transliteration: "Īda" (Japanese: 飯田)	August 10, 2014
7	"Beautiful Voice"; Transliteration: "Bisei" (Japanese: 美声)	August 17, 2014
8	"Word Chain"; Transliteration: "Shiritori" (Japanese: 尻取)	August 24, 2014
9	"Rejected"; Transliteration: "Kyakka" (Japanese: 却下)	August 31, 2014
10	"Negative"; Transliteration: "Insei" (Japanese: 陰性)	September 7, 2014
11	"Application"; Transliteration: "Ōbo" (Japanese: 応募)	September 14, 2014
12	"Infiltration"; Transliteration: "Sen'nyū" (Japanese: 潜入)	September 21, 2014
13	"Komohatake"; Transliteration: "Komo hata" (Japanese: 隠畑)	September 28, 2014
