= Chinami Hashimoto =

Japanese voice actress

- 橋本 ちなみ
- Born: July 17, 1992 (age 34); Nagano Prefecture, Japan
- Occupation: Voice actress
- Years active: 2014–present
- Agent: VIMS
- Notable credits: Recently, My Sister Is Unusual as Mitsuki Kanzaki; Prison School as Chiyo Kurihara

Chinami Hashimoto (橋本 ちなみ, Hashimoto Chinami; born July 17, 1992) is a Japanese voice actress from Nagano Prefecture affiliated with VIMS.

== Biography ==
Hashimoto became interested in acting, while watching a concert held by the cast for the anime series Di Gi Charat. Although her parents were disapproved of her plans, partly as a joke, she enrolled at a voice acting school operated by the agency VIMS. She made her voice acting debut as Mitsuki Kanzaki, the lead character of the 2014 anime television series Recently, My Sister Is Unusual.

== Filmography ==
=== Anime ===
==== 2014 ====
- Recently, My Sister Is Unusual as Mitsuki Kanzaki
- Argevollen as Shion Kaoru

==== 2015 ====
- Aria the Scarlet Ammo Double A as Yaya Aizawa
- Prison School as Chiyo Kurihara

==== 2016 ====
- Lostorage incited WIXOSS as Suzuko Homura

==== 2018 ====
- The Ryuo's Work Is Never Done! as Ayano Sadatō

==== 2019 ====
- Magical Girl Spec-Ops Asuka as Sayako Hata
- High School Prodigies Have It Easy Even In Another World as Rue

==== 2021 ====
- Cute Executive Officer as Riya Motohashi

==== 2022 ====
- Love After World Domination as Urami Magahara
- Princess Connect! Re:Dive Season 2 as Eriko / Eriko Kuraishi
- Extreme Hearts as QON-N4CX Nono

==== 2023 ====
- Cute Executive Officer R as Riya Motohashi

=== Video games ===
- Monster Strike as Torin Dead Rabbits Ltd. (2016)
- Umamusume: Pretty Derby as Fine Motion (2021)
- Grim Guardians: Demon Purge as Maya Kamizono (2022)
- Trickcal: Chibi Go as Barong (2026)

=== Web series ===
- Umayon as Fine Motion (2020)
- Umayuru as Fine Motion (2022)
