= Hiyori Nitta =

Japanese voice actress

- 新田 ひより
- Born: July 1, 1997 (age 29); Tokyo, Japan
- Occupation: Voice actress
- Years active: 2014–present
- Agent: Arts Vision
- Notable work: Jinsei as Rino Endō; Märchen Mädchen as Mai Sadohara; Umamusume: Pretty Derby as Matikanefukukitaru; Pastel Memories as Izumi Asagi; Dropout Idol Fruit Tart as Ino Sakura

Hiyori Nitta (新田 ひより, Nitta Hiyori; born July 1, 1997) is a Japanese voice actress from Tokyo, Japan. She began her career in 2014, playing a role in the anime television series Nobunagun; later that year, she played her first main role as Rino Endō in the anime series Jinsei. She is known for her roles as Mai Sadohara in Märchen Mädchen, Matikanefukukitaru in Umamusume: Pretty Derby, Izumi Asagi in Pastel Memories, and Ino Sakura in Dropout Idol Fruit Tart.

== Biography ==
Nitta was born in Tokyo on July 1, 1997. She first became interested in anime during her sixth year of elementary school, when she began watching the series HeartCatch PreCure!. At the time, the series was the only anime that she was allowed to watch while studying for her examinations. After becoming a fan, she aspired to become part of the cast of a PreCure series within ten years.

Nitta began her voice acting training during her third year of junior high school, enrolling at the Japan Narration Acting Institute. She would later become affiliated with the voice acting agency Arts Vision. Her first role in an anime series was in the 2014 anime series Nobunagun. That same year, she would play her first main role as Rino Endō in the anime series Jinsei; she, together with fellow cast members Moe Toyota and Ayaka Suwa, performed the series's ending theme "Jinsei Kimi-Iro" (人生☆キミ色). In 2016, she played the role of Hime Wazumi in High School Fleet.

In 2018, Nitta played the roles of Mai Sadohara in Märchen Mädchen, Gabriel in Seven Mortal Sins, and Karin Domyoji in The Idolmaster Cinderella Girls. She also played Izumi Asagi in the mobile game Pastel Memories, later reprising the role for the game's 2019 anime series adaptation. She has also been cast as Ino Sakura, the protagonist of the anime series Ochikobore Fruit Tart.

== Filmography ==
=== Anime ===
2014

- Nobunagun
- Jinsei as Rino Endō

2015

- Uta no Prince-sama as Passerby
- Aria the Scarlet Ammo AA as Konayuki Hitogi
- Magical Girl Lyrical Nanoha ViVid as 1084
- Lance N' Masques as Shaolon

2016

- Monster Strike as Sexy Roller Player (episode 8)
- Prince of Stride as Schoolgirl (episode 1)
- Active Raid as Girl (episode 10)
- Snow White with the Red Hair as Female officer
- Undefeated Bahamut Chronicle as Schoolgirl
- High School Fleet as Hime Wazumi
- Prince of Stride: Alternative as Schoolgirl (episode 1)
- Momokuri as Class student (episode 2)
- Mob Psycho 100 as Female student (episode 2)
- Magical Girl Raising Project as Natsumi (episode 7)

2017

- Keijo as Sayuri Uotani (episode 1)

2018

- Märchen Mädchen as Mai Sadohara
- Umamusume: Pretty Derby as Matikanefukukitaru
- Alice or Alice as Alpaca-san, Kabi Usagi

2019

- Pastel Memories as Izumi Asagi
- Why the Hell are You Here, Teacher!? as Satou Shio
- Val × Love as Sue

2020

- Dropout Idol Fruit Tart as Ino Sakura

2021

- Seirei Gensouki: Spirit Chronicles as Sara

2023

- The Ice Guy and His Cool Female Colleague as Yukimin

=== Anime film ===
2020

- High School Fleet: The Movie as Hime Wazumi

=== Games ===
2018

- Girls' Frontline as LWMMG

2020

- Azur Lane as Prinz Heinrich

2021

- Umamusume: Pretty Derby as Matikanefukukitaru

2023

- Disgaea 7 as Piririka
- Fuga: Melodies of Steel 2 as Wappa Charlott
- Goddess of Victory: Nikke as Anchor

2024

- Blue Archive as Umika Satohama
