= Cute Executive Officer =

Japanese comedy manga series

- Cover of the first tankōbon volume, featuring Mayu Warito (left) and Najimu Mujina (right)

幼女社長 (Yōjo Shachō)
- Genre: Comedy
- Manga
- Written by: Odeko Fujii
- Published by: Kadokawa Shoten
- Magazine: Curazy Manga; ComicWalker
- Original run: January 2018 – present
- Volumes: 3
- Original net animation
- Directed by: Kazuya Iwata
- Written by: Satoru Sugizawa
- Music by: H Zett M
- Studio: Project No.9
- Licensed by: Sentai Filmworks
- Released: January 1, 2021
- Episodes: 13
- Original net animation

Cute Executive Officer R
- Directed by: Kazuya Iwata
- Written by: Satoru Sugizawa
- Music by: Soshina
- Studio: Project No.9
- Released: July 1, 2023 – September 23, 2023
- Episodes: 13

Cute Executive Officer (Japanese: 幼女社長, Hepburn: Yōjo Shachō; lit. "Little Girl President") is a Japanese comedy manga series by Odeko Fujii. It has been serialized online via the website Curazy Manga since January 2018 and has been collected in three tankōbon volumes by Kadokawa Shoten. It is also available on Kadokawa Shoten's ComicWalker website. An original net animation (ONA) anime adaptation by Project No.9 premiered in January 2021, with a second season airing from July to September 2023.

== Characters ==
Najimu Mujina (六科なじむ, Mujina Najimu)
Voiced by: Rina Hidaka
Yuki Karuizawa (軽井沢ユキ, Karuizawa Yuki)
Voiced by: Sumire Uesaka
Mayu Warito (割戸真友, Warito Mayu)
Voiced by: Hisako Kanemoto
Garcia Dekasegi (出稼ぎガルシア, Dekasegi Garushia)
Voiced by: Sayaka Kaneko
Riya Motohashi (元橋リヤ, Motohashi Riya)
Voiced by: Chinami Hashimoto
Nowani (野ワニ, Nowani)
Voiced by: Aoi Koga
Complaining Customer (クレーマー, Kurēmā)
Voiced by: Tomokazu Sugita
Mr. Corn Potage (コンポタおじさん, Konpota oji san)
Voiced by: Chō
Bakery Manager (パン屋の店主, Panya no tenshu)
Voiced by: Hōchū Ōtsuka
Garcia's Mother (ガルシアの母, Garushia no haha)
Voiced by: Aya Hisakawa
Fat Salaryman (太リーマン, Futoriiman)
Voiced by: Kazuyuki Okitsu
Tanryūsai Suda (須田丹龍斎)
Voiced by: Tesshō Genda
TV Director (テレビD, Terebi D)
Voiced by: Jun Fukuyama
Designer (デザイナー, Dezainā)
Voiced by: Kotori Koiwai
Najimu's Mother (なじむの母, Najimu no haha)
Voiced by: Yukari Tamura
Yoshine Fudō
Voiced by: Ikumi Hasegawa
Ray Okano
Voiced by: Yui Ogura
Mugaku Hamaoka
Voiced by: Akio Otsuka
Yamada-san
Dokudakomaru

== Media ==
=== Manga ===
No.	Release date	ISBN
1	April 26, 2019	978-4-04-065688-5
2	November 15, 2019	978-4-04-064103-4
3	January 14, 2021	978-4-04-680221-7

=== Anime ===
An anime adaptation was announced by Odeko Fujii on September 30, 2020. It was later revealed to be an original net animation (ONA) in December 2020. The series was animated by Project No.9 and directed by Kazuya Iwata, with Satoru Sugizawa handling series' composition, Susumu Watanabe designing the characters, and H Zett M composing the series' music. It began streaming online on January 1, 2021, via the anime's official website and Twitter account. The opening theme song is "March Onward! Mujina Company" (進め！むじなカンパニー; "Susume! Mujina Kanpanī") performed by Neko Hacker, featuring Najimu Mujina (Rina Hidaka), Mayu Warito (Hisako Kanemoto), Yuki Karuizawa (Sumire Uesaka) and Garcia Dekasegi (Sayaka Kaneko), while the ending theme song is "Let's Go Back to Work!" (会社に帰ろう！; "Kaisha ni Kaerō!") performed by Mayu Warito (Hisako Kanemoto), featuring Kotori Koiwai. Sentai Filmworks licensed the anime. They released it by editing all the episodes into one full-length episode.

On September 18, 2022, a second season titled Cute Executive Officer R was announced and the staff and cast reprised their roles from the previous season. It aired from July 1 to September 23, 2023. The season's opening theme song is "Sound Off! Mujina Symphony" (鳴らせ！むじなシンフォニー; "Narase! Mujina Shinfonī") performed by Arisa Sonohara, while the ending theme song is "Y-O-U-R R-O-Y-A-L H-I-G-H-N-E-S-S!" (オ・ヒ・メ・サ・マ！; "O-Hi-Me-Sa-Ma!!") performed by Neko Hacker.

No.	Title (Note: All English titles are taken from HIDIVE.)	Original release date
1	"Contract"; Transliteration: "Keiyakusho" (Japanese: けいやくしょ)	January 1, 2021
2	"Complaint"; Transliteration: "Kurēmu" (Japanese: くれーむ)	January 1, 2021
3	"Overtime"; Transliteration: "Zangyō" (Japanese: ざんぎょう)	January 1, 2021
3	"Corporate Drone"; Transliteration: "Shachiku" (Japanese: しゃちく)	January 1, 2021
4	"Bankruptcy"; Transliteration: "Tōsan" (Japanese: とうさん)	January 1, 2021
5	"Office Cleaning"; Transliteration: "Kaisha no Sōji" (Japanese: かいしゃのそうじ)	January 1, 2021
5	"Hometown"; Transliteration: "Jikka" (Japanese: じっか)	January 1, 2021
6	"My First Errand"; Transliteration: "Hajimete no Otsukai" (Japanese: はじめてのおつかい)	January 1, 2021
7	"Interview"; Transliteration: "Mensetsu" (Japanese: めんせつ)	January 1, 2021
8	"Cholesterol"; Transliteration: "Koresuterōru" (Japanese: これすてろーる)	January 1, 2021
8	"Annual Physical"; Transliteration: "Ningen Dokku" (Japanese: にんげんどっく)	January 1, 2021
9	"TV Shoot"; Transliteration: "Terebi Shuzai" (Japanese: てれびしゅざい)	January 1, 2021
10	"Presents"; Transliteration: "Temiyage" (Japanese: てみやげ)	January 1, 2021
11	"Design"; Transliteration: "Dezain" (Japanese: でざいん)	January 1, 2021
12	"Kidnapping Part 1"; Transliteration: "Yūkai Sono Ichi" (Japanese: ゆうかい その1)	January 1, 2021
12	"Kidnapping Part 2"; Transliteration: "Yūkai Sono Ni" (Japanese: ゆうかい その2)	January 1, 2021
13	"Slogan"; Transliteration: "Surōgan" (Japanese: すろーがん)	January 1, 2021
13	"Morning Meeting (Ending)"; Transliteration: "Chōrei (Endingu)" (Japanese: ちょうれい（エンディング）)	January 1, 2021

== Reception ==
In 2019, Cute Executive Officer was nominated for the 5th Next Manga Awards in the digital category and placed 20th out of 50 nominees.
