= Satomi Amano =

Japanese voice actress

- 天野 聡美
- Born: November 29; Kanagawa Prefecture, Japan
- Occupation: Voice actress
- Years active: 2018–present
- Agent: VIMS
- Notable work: The Idolmaster Cinderella Girls as Hotaru Shiragiku; Tamayomi as Tamaki Yamazaki

Satomi Amano (天野 聡美, Amano Satomi; born November 29) is a Japanese voice actress from Kanagawa Prefecture who is affiliated with VIMS. She is known for her roles as Hotaru Shiragiku in The Idolmaster Cinderella Girls, Tamaki Yamazaki in Tamayomi, Rena Kitayama in World's End Harem, and Yutori Kokorogi in Tomodachi Game.

On July 18, 2022, Amano tested positive for COVID-19.

== Filmography ==
=== TV series ===
2019

- The Idolmaster Cinderella Girls Theater as Hotaru Shiragiku

2020

- Tamayomi as Tamaki Yamazaki
- Kuma Kuma Kuma Bear as Misana Farrengram

2021

- Tropical-Rouge! Pretty Cure as Shiori Nakagawa

2022

- Miss Kuroitsu from the Monster Development Department as Wolf Bate
- World's End Harem as Rena Kitayama
- Tomodachi Game as Yutori Kokorogi

2023

- Summoned to Another World for a Second Time as Yūhi
- FLCL Shoegaze as Harumi Oraisho
- The 100 Girlfriends Who Really, Really, Really, Really, Really Love You as Asakawa

2024

- Wistoria: Wand and Sword as Colette Loire
- A Journey Through Another World as Luna
- Let This Grieving Soul Retire! as Chloe Welter

=== ONAs ===
2026

- Devils' Crest as Minagi Sano

=== Films ===
2020

- High School Fleet: The Movie as Tsubame Kawano

=== Video games ===
2021

- Arknights as Scene
- A Certain Magical Index: Imaginary Fest as Patricia Birdway
