= Yuuko Kurose =

Japanese voice actress

- Born: May 7 Hiroshima Prefecture, Japan
- Education: Kwansei Gakuin University
- Occupation: Voice actress
- Agent: VIMS
- Notable work: Tokyo 7th Sisters as Qruit Kotobuki; High School Fleet as Kouko Nosa

Yuuko Kurose (黒瀬 ゆうこ, Kurose Yūko; born May 7) is a Japanese voice actress affiliated with the talent agency VIMS.

== Biography ==
Kurose was born on May 7 in Hiroshima Prefecture. She graduated from Hiroshima Jogakuin Junior & Senior High School, and Kwansei Gakuin University. While in college, she attended the Osaka branch of Japan Narration Actor Institute and transferred to the Tokyo branch after graduating. In 2014, she played her first major role as Qruit Kotobuki in the video game Tokyo 7th Sisters. While working as a voice actress, she also worked at a toy company, but left the company after she got to perform in a Tokyo 7th Sisters' live concert because she wanted to focus on her voice acting career. She was cast in another main role as Kouko Nosa in the 2016 anime television series High School Fleet.

She was aspired to become a voice actress after listening to a Hoshin Engi's drama CD and due to her activities in the broadcasting club at her school. When she was in high school, she went to one of the CD release events in Hiroshima and met Sakura Nogawa, who complimented her voice, which made Kurose became aware of her talent. She cited that having Miyu Matsuki as a senior at her school had also encouraged her to become a voice actress.

In October 2022, Kurose announced her marriage and the birth of her child.

== Filmography ==
=== Anime ===
List of voice performances in anime
Year	Title	Role	Notes	Source
2013	No Matter How I Look at It, It's You Guys' Fault I'm Not Popular!	Hina Nemoto		
2014	Hetalia The Beautiful World Extra Disc	England	OVA	
2014	Baby Steps	Girl	Ep.10-11, 23	
2014	Selector infected WIXOSS	Girl	Ep.12	
2016–2020	High School Fleet	Kouko Nosa	also OVA and High School Fleet: The Movie	
2017	PriPri Chi-chan!!	Ucchan		
2019	Hitori Bocchi no Marumaru Seikatsu	Sotoka Rakita	also performed the opening theme	
2020	Kuma Kuma Kuma Bear	Kumakyuu		

=== Video games ===
List of voice performances in video games
Year	Title	Role	Notes	Source
2011	Waguruma!	Kyonshii		
2012	Ren'ai Banchou 2: Midnight Lesson!!!			
2014	Tokyo 7th Sisters	Qruit Kotobuki, Oto Shishigome		
2016	Blazing Odyssey	Liesel		
2016	Puzzle of Empire	Chouhi, Suleiman		
2018	Lost Trigger	Tapi		
2019	High School Fleet: Kantai Battle de Pinch!	Kouko Nosa		
2019	Destiny Child	Annie		
2020	Nekotsuku, Sakura.	Ayano Hotaka	Eroge; credited as Popuri Gou	
2020	Arknights	Click		
2022	Heaven Burns Red	Maki Kurosawa		
