= Pastel Memories =

Japanese video game and anime series

- Promotional image for the anime

ぱすてるメモリーズ (Pasuteru Memorīzu)
- Video game
- Developer: FuRyu
- Publisher: FuRyu
- Platform: Android, iOS
- Released: JP: October 23, 2017
- Manga
- Written by: Kairaku Kano
- Published by: Media Factory
- Magazine: Monthly Comic Alive
- Original run: December 27, 2018 – March 27, 2019
- Volumes: 1
- Anime television series
- Directed by: Yasuyuki Shinozaki
- Written by: Gō Tamai
- Music by: Akiyuki Tateyama
- Studio: Project No.9
- Licensed by: NA: Sentai Filmworks
- Original network: Tokyo MX, SUN, KBS, BS Fuji
- Original run: January 8, 2019 – March 26, 2019
- Episodes: 12

Pastel Memories (ぱすてるメモリーズ, Pasuteru Memorīzu) was a Japanese role-playing video game developed by FuRyu. It was released in Japan on October 23, 2017, for Android and iOS devices. The game's service ended on August 6, 2019. An anime television series adaptation by Project No.9 aired from January 8 to March 26, 2019.

== Plot ==
In the year 20XX, manga and anime culture has been gradually disappearing from Akihabara. This is the result of a mysterious malicious virus that infects the worlds of various fictional works and destroys them, along with anyone's memories of them. Standing against this are the members of the Rabbit Shed Shop café, who possess the ability to travel into these worlds in order to stop the virus.

== Characters ==
Izumi Asagi (浅木 泉水, Asagi Izumi)
Voiced by: Hiyori Nitta
An energetic and positive high school girl who is childhood friends with the manager of The Rabbit Hut Headquarters and a self-proclaimed "in-training." She's inquisitive about anything and everything, and is able to be friends with just about anybody.
Ayaka Sakaki (榊 亜矢香, Sakaki Ayaka)
Voiced by: Mariko Toribe
She's very smart and full of knowledge, but a bit shy. She's a first-rate cosplayer, and really likes mushrooms for some reason.
Irina Leskova (イリーナ・レスコヴァ, Irīna Resukova)
Voiced by: Yumi Uchiyama
A girl from Russia who can speak fluent Japanese. She's very strict and stubborn, and likes Japan and military paraphernalia.
Kaoruko Nijouin (二条院 薫子, Nijōin Kaoruko)
Voiced by: Yukiyo Fujii
The daughter of a rich family who is skilled in her studies, as well as martial arts and the fine arts. She is somewhat of an elitist anime fan, but is very kind to her friends.
Yuina Machiya (町屋 結衣奈, Machiya Yuina)
Voiced by: Rie Murakawa
A girl who loves pity and is lovable, emotional, cat-like. Maid clothes have a strong commitment and have the ability to become friends with anyone immediately.
Michi Edogawabashi (江戸川橋 美智, Edogawabashi Michi)
Voiced by: Naomi Ōzora
A mysterious and mature girl who likes making clothes for her dolls. Her behavior can't be read ahead because her emotions aren't exposed.
Minami Senju (千住 南海, Senju Minami)
Voiced by: Ai Yamamoto
The fostering game that has a very kind and homely atmosphere is a hobbyist, big character, and everyone's mother role 520 which is not often serious or angry.
Chimari Maiko (舞子 ちまり, Maiko Chimari)
Voiced by: Yui Ogura
A serious, polite, and historical nerd girl who speaks in honor of anyone. Some cowards can starve when fear reach her limits.
Nao Mejiro (目白 渚央, Mejiro Nao)
Voiced by: Hisako Kanemoto (game), Yumiri Hanamori (anime)
A hot-blooded girl who loves boy cartoons and tackles everything with full power. It has a very high physical ability, but it has a hot but contagious and weak side.
Rei Kurushima (来島 怜, Kurushima Rei)
Voiced by: Yurika Kubo
A girl with a cool character who usually likes to make Kubo lily coupler model and is usually slammed. There are many things to hide her true spirit, there is also a shy side.
Komachi Satonaka (里中 小町, Satonaka Komachi)
Voiced by: Megumi Toda
It's kind of stupid, but always a smile and everyone's mood maker. Whose hobbies are taking pictures with her camera.
Saori Rokugou (六郷 沙織, Rokugō Saori)
Voiced by: Kotori Koiwai
An optimistic, natural and tender girl. Who is an inventor and a young genius doctor who produces an invention that surpasses wisdom.
Nejire Usagi (ねじれウサギ; lit. 'Screw Rabbit')
Voiced by: Chitose Morinaga
A talking rabbit with a screw in his head, nicknamed "NejiUsa" for short.
Maya (摩耶)
Voiced by: Chiaki Takahashi
The main antagonist of the series, who travels to the worlds of various series in order to spread viruses and destroy them.

== Anime ==
An anime television series adaptation by Project No.9 was announced, and it aired from January 8 to March 26, 2019, on Tokyo MX, (Note: Tokyo MX lists the show at 24:30 on January 7, which is at 12:30 a.m. on January 8, 2019.) Sun TV, KBS, and BS Fuji. Asami Imai performed the series' opening theme, "Believe in Sky," and Iketeru Hearts performed the series' ending theme, "Sparkle☆Power." The series is licensed by Sentai Filmworks and is simulcast on its Hidive streaming service. The series ran for 12 episodes. Following decisions by the production committee, speculated to be related to the show's parody of Is the Order a Rabbit? in the first two episodes, the first episode was replaced with a revised version on March 26, 2019, while the second episode was removed from streaming services on the same day. A Blu-ray disc boxset, containing all episodes except the second, was released on June 5, 2019.

No.	Title (Note: All English titles are taken from Hidive.)	Original air date
1	"Welcome To The Rabbit Shed Shop"; Transliteration: "Usagi Koya Honpo e Yōkoso, desu" (Japanese: うさぎ小屋本舗へようこそ、です)	January 8, 2019
In the year 20XX, where manga and anime culture has all but disappeared from Akihabara, Izumi Asagi and her fellow members of the Rabbit Shed Shop café take on a customer's request to assemble the complete set of volumes to the manga they based their store on, Welcome to the Rabbit Café. Before the set can be complete, however, the girls discover the manga has become infected with a virus that will cause it to eventually disappear from everyone's memories. In order to prevent that, Izumi, along with Ayaka Sakaki and Irina Leskova and their mascot Nejiusa, venture into the world of Welcome to the Rabbit Café in order to exterminate the virus.
2	"What to say to "May I Take Your Order?""; Transliteration: "Gochūmon wa? to Iwarete mo..." (Japanese: ご注文は？と言われても……)	January 15, 2019
Upon arriving in the world of Welcome to the Rabbit Café, the girls discover that the virus has turned everything related to rabbits into eels. The girls soon face up against the one behind the chaos, Maya of the Black Elites, who sets the mother virus loose to speed up the infection. Despite some setbacks, the girls succeed in destroying the mother virus and restoring the world to normal. Upon returning home, the girls manage to complete the manga's collection and use what they learned to improve their own coffee.
3	"We're the Rosy Maidens"; Transliteration: "Barairo no Otome, na no" (Japanese: 薔薇色の乙女、なの)	January 22, 2019
Michi Edogawabashi, who loves making clothes for dolls, becomes downhearted when her friends Kaoruko Nijouin and Yuina Machiya forget about her favorite anime, The Rosy Maidens. Discovering the series has been infected, Michi, Kaoruko, and Yuina venture into The Rosy Maidens's, discovering that the doll character's cute clothes have been replaced with tracksuits. When Michi dresses up as one of the characters to show them what it is really like, the other doll takes her away into her dream world to try and get Michi to dress up as her, only for both of them to get attacked by Maya. Upon venturing into the dream world to rescue Michi, Kaoruko and Yuina manage to remember how The Rosy Maidens was an important part of how they became friends and soon come to Michi's aid. After defeating the mother virus and returning the characters to normal, the girls hold a The Rosy Maidens themed event at a café.
4	"Elementary School Kids Are The Best!"; Transliteration: "Shōgaku-sei wa Saikō -poyo!" (Japanese: 小学生は最高ぽよ！)	January 29, 2019
After meeting a young girl playing basketball in the park, Komachi Satonaka looks into the girl's favorite light novel, Mini Basket!, which her friends are slowly forgetting about due to the virus. Komachi goes with Saori Rokugou and Rei Kurushima into the world of Mini Basket!, where Maya, who wants to get rid of all the young girls in the series, challenges them to a game of basketball. Receiving coaching from the novel's protagonist, the girls face off Maya's team of viruses. After Maya's attempt at cheating at the last minute results in the game being rendered void, the girls defeat the virus normally.
5	"Here, Here, Here, Like That?"; Transliteration: "Kō kō kō, desu ka?" (Japanese: こうこうこう、ですか？)	February 5, 2019
Minami Senju, Chimari Maiko, and Nao Mejiro venture inside the light novel Shogi King's Big Job!, coming up against turtle viruses that can only be defeated by clearing tsume shogi problems. Aided by the novel's heroine, Mai Tsurumizu, the girls learn that Maya has captured her master, along with other strong shogi players, and trapped them inside the shogi hall. Helping the girls get past all the shogi problems, Mai soon faces up against the Mother Virus in a shogi battle while Maya dispatches viruses to try and distract her. Despite drawing close to her limit, Mai manages to give and receive encouragement from Chimari, allowing her to beat the Mother Virus.
6	"It's Not That I Like Hamsters..."; Transliteration: "Be, Betsu ni Hamusutā ga Sukitte Wake ja..." (Japanese: べ、別にハムスターが好きってわけじゃ……)	February 12, 2019
As Rei Kurushima tries to hide her secret obsession with cute things, the world of The Unimpressive Chutaro is infected by the virus. Venturing inside Chutaro's world with Izumi and Minami, Rei discovers that the virus has turned all the cute animals hostile and becomes separated from the others. Rei soon comes across Chutaro himself and becomes unable to contain her fondness for cute things, which Izumi soon discovers. Maya attempts to take advantage of this knowledge to overwhelm Rei with shame, but Rei soon realises the importance of protecting what you love and overcomes her embarrassment to defeat Maya and return everything to normal.
7	"Can Fighters Make Lots of Money?"; Transliteration: "Yūsha tte Mōkaru nya?" (Japanese: 勇者ってもうかるにゃ？)	February 19, 2019
Irina, Yuina, and Saori venture inside the role-playing game Quest of Phantasia to fight against the game's devil boss. After facing constant restarts from dying repeatedly, Saori suddenly starts acting negatively for a day, which leads to Irina and Yuina being captured by the devil. The next morning, Saori returns to normal, allowing her to rescue the others and defeat both the devil and Maya.
8	"A Showdown! It's a Food Battle!"; Transliteration: "Taiketsu! Oryōri Batoru ya!" (Japanese: 対決！お料理バトルや！)	February 26, 2019
The girls find that Nao, who is normally bad at cooking, vastly improves when she enters a girly mode upon being praised. When the gourmet manga The FoodMaster becomes infected with the virus, Nao goes with Ayaka and Minami into the world, where the titular FoodMaster is struggling to get customers after Maya attacked the shopping district. Maya challenges Nao to a cooking battle, distracting her with viruses that cause her to lose her girly mode. Despite using a mind-controlling potion to win over the judge, Nao manages to win with her curry, unaware it was her virus affecting everyone's tastes.
9	"Let's Become the Masters of Romance"; Transliteration: "Mezase Ren'ai no Tatsujin, desu wa" (Japanese: 目指せ恋愛の達人、ですわ)	March 5, 2019
When Kaoru struggles with getting a good ending in a dating sim game, she buys up a whole bunch of dating sims and spends all night playing them. As Kaoruko tries to show one of the older games, Love Love Legend, to Irina and Chimari, they find it has been infected with the virus, discovering that Maya has turned all the heroines against boys out of spite due to her own romantic failures. After her knowledge of dating sims fail to woo Maya, Kaoruko is encouraged by her friends to be herself and win Maya's heart. Just before the happy ending, however, the virus, going against Maya's orders, turns all the other heroines into yandere girls seeking revenge. After Kaoruko manages to defeat the Mother Virus, Maya gives her thanks to her for showing her a day of romance.
10	"Goodbye, Nejiusa..."; Transliteration: "Sayonara, Nejiusa..." (Japanese: さよなら、ねじウサ……)	March 12, 2019
Ayaka, Nao, and Michi head inside the world of Kontoshi Toya, where they take the place of protagonist Toya and fight their way through an academy to save the student council president Akina. While the others stay behind to fight tough opponents, Ayaka confronts Maya and overpowers her with her intense manga knowledge. When the mother virus goes berserk, Toya, the girls, and the opponents they defeated and befriended along the way give Ayaka the power to defeat it.
11	"Is it True?! Final Battle in Akihabara!"; Transliteration: "Kessen, Akihabara! tte honto!?" (Japanese: 決戦、アキハバラ！ってホント!?)	March 19, 2019
When the virus targets the worldwide popular mecha anime, Neon Nova Exceed, Izumi, Komachi, and Kaoruko head inside its world, which resembles what Akihabara looked like before it lost its anime culture. As the girls struggle against the more powerful viruses, the mother virus once again begins acting against Maya's orders due to the show's increased fanbase. Calling a temporary truce with Maya, the girls attempt to use the titular Exceed mech, only to discover the scientists lack the manpower to build it. Needing Saori's help to complete Exceed, Kaoruko and the others stay behind so that Irina can return to the real world and recruit everyone's help.
12	"Pastel Memories"; Transliteration: "Pasuteru Memorīzu" (Japanese: ぱすてるメモリーズ)	March 26, 2019
After finding video proof that Komachi and Kaoruko, the girls build their own mechs to confront the mother virus. However, the mother virus powers itself up with the surrounding viruses and overpowering them. Just then, Kaoruko, Komachi, and Maya arrive with Exceed, helping the girls to defeat the mother virus and restore the manga's world to normal.
