= Tokyo 7th Sisters =

2014 video game

- Developer: Donuts Co. Ltd
- Publisher: Donuts Co. Ltd
- Director: Shintaro Motegi
- Producers: Shintaro Motegi; Taka Maekawa; Masaru Yoshioka; Yoshiaki Iwasawa
- Writer: Shintaro Motegi
- Composers: Shintaro Motegi; kz (Livetune)
- Platforms: iOS; Android
- Release: February 2014
- Genre: Rhythm game
- Mode: Single-player

Tokyo 7th Sisters (Japanese: 東京 7th シスターズ) is a Japanese idol raising simulation and rhythm game released for iOS and Android in February 2014, developed and published by Donuts Co. Ltd. with music produced and published under record label Victor Entertainment. The game has a story mode (called Scout in-game) in which players search for idol cards while progressing through the story, and a battle mode in which players battle other players or certain in-game characters using their idol cards.

A 77-minute anime film adaptation by LandQ Studios titled Tokyo 7th Sisters: Bokura wa Aozora ni Naru was scheduled to air in summer 2020, but has been delayed to February 26, 2021, due to the COVID-19 pandemic.

On May 7, 2026, the game was announced to end service on August 12, 2026. An offline version would be available later.

== Story ==
The story centers on new generation idols from the studio 777, referred to as Nanastar, which suddenly disbanded in 2032. Two years later, in 2034, the player is appointed head of Tokyo's new idol studio Nanastar, recruiting different girls to be trainees by collecting and leveling collectible cards. The cast of characters includes more than 50 fully-voiced, unique idols from different backgrounds. Nonetheless, the city persists in thinking that idols belong to a bygone era, and Nanastar is not an exception.

== Characters ==
=== Nanastar Managers ===
- Coney Rokusaki (六咲コニー, Rokusaki Konī) is Coney is an 19-year-old girl who suddenly introduces herself as the "Talent reganaM" from the first generation of idols. She is co-manager of Nanastar alongside the player. Coney is high-spirited, but is also very considerate and acts as a good counselor for the recruited girls. She is a big troublemaker and seems to be hiding a secret.
- Manager (支配人, Shihainin) is the playable character whose name can be changed, and has been chosen as the second manager of Nanastar. Their new enthusiastic manager, Coney Rokusaki, sends them out to the city to scout for idols.
- The First Manager (Voiced by: Keiji Fujiwara) is player's predecessor who was in charge of 7th Sisters prior to their disbandment.

=== Seventh Sisters ===
- Nicole Nanasaki (七咲ニコル, Nanasaki Nikoru) (Voiced by: Inori Minase) is a relentless idol terrorist, the chaotic leader of the legendary Seventh Sisters. A kind yet lazy hard worker, she attracts attention from all over the world. Two years after the sudden dissolution, no one has any news of her.
- Mito Hanyuda (羽生田ミト, Hanyuda Mito) (Voiced by: Mai Fuchigami) is a member of the Seventh Sisters known for her world-class beautiful voice. She is usually emotionless and does not want to waste her energy while singing.
- Mana Misono (御園尾マナ, Misonoō Mana) (Voiced by: Rena Maeda) is the daughter of Misono Zaibatsu. She is a gentle mood-maker who supports the Seventh Sisters from behind the scenes. Mana is shy about her dynamite body, but sometimes shows a dignified adult side that surprises the members.
- Qruit Kotobuki (寿クルト, Kotobuki Kuruto) (Voiced by: Yuuko Kurose) is an orphan who grew up in the circus. She is always hungry and often bites the head of the members of the Seventh Sisters and gets scolded.
- Rui Wakaoji (若王子ルイ, Wakaōji Rui) (Voiced by: Meiko Kawasaki) is the calm, oldest member of the Seventh Sisters with an invincible demeanor.
- Memoru Yusa (遊佐メモル, Yusa Memoru) (Voiced by: Ayumi Tsuji) is a girl known for her devilish persona.

=== 777 Sisters ===
- 春日部ハル (Kusakabe Haru) (Voiced by: Minami Shimoda) is the first idol to be recruited into Nanastar. She is an energetic 16-year-old girl who loves to sing despite her initial hatred towards idols. After joining Nanastar, Haru acts as the mediator for everyone. Her interests are cleaning and collecting keychains.
- Musubi Tendōji (天堂寺ムスビ, Tendōji Musubi) (Voiced by: Yūki Takada) is a 16-year-old first year high school student and part of the student council. She is excellent in studies but worries easily and may have many weakness.
- Rona Tsunomori (角森ロナ, Tsunomori Rona) (Voiced by: Ai Kakuma) is the third idol to be recruited into Nanastar. She is a 16-year-old girl who works part-time at the doughnut chain Viva Donuts. A timid worrywart, Rona initially thought poorly of herself until she discovered 7th Sisters' music, encouraging her to become an idol.
- Hime Nonohara (野ノ原ヒメ, Nonohara Hime) (Voiced by: Yui Nakajima) is the fourth idol to be recruited into Nanastar. She is the tomboyish 16-year-old daughter of a family that worked at Nonohara Tofu Shop. Hime lives with her father, younger sister, and younger brother; her mother died when she was young.
- Momoka Serizawa (芹沢モモカ, Serizawa Momoka) (Voiced by: Shiori Izawa) is the fifth idol to be recruited into Nanastar. A 15-year-old first year high school student, Momoka was spoiled as a child, leading her to live a lazy and selfish life. Despite this, she is a very passionate otaku.
- Sumire Usuta (臼田スミレ, Usuta Sumire) (Voiced by: Ayaka Shimizu) is the sixth idol to be recruited into Nanastar. She is a 17-year-old girl who grew up in an ordinary family, leading her to a glamorous lifestyle. Sumire is talented at cooking and has a crush on the player in-game.
- Sui Kamishiro (神城スイ, Kamishiro Sui) (Voiced by: Haruka Michii) is the seventh idol to be recruited into Nanastar. She is a regular tomboy with a talent for swimming, but does not get along well with boys.
- Shizuka Kuonji (久遠寺シズカ, Kuonji Shizuka) (Voiced by: Asaka Imai) is the eighth idol to be recruited into Nanastar. She is the youngest daughter of the Kuonji family, which owns a large estate. Shizuka is gifted in both literary and military arts, but knows nothing about the real world.
- Alessandra Susu (Voiced by: Saori Ōnishi) is the ninth idol to be recruited into Nanastar. Susu is one of the ten foreign idols in the game; she is fluent in Japanese, but likes to occasionally use English. Susu is a 14-year-old girl who likes to act older than she is and has the style of a model, which gets her mistaken as a foreign celebrity.
- Sawara Harumi (晴海サワラ, Harumi Sawara) (Voiced by: Sakura Nakamura) is the tenth idol to be recruited into Nanastar. The eldest daughter of the Harumi family at 19 years old, she helps manage their fish market Uoharu with her sisters. Lazy and strange, Sawara does not pay attention to others' gossip about her personality. Deep down, she can be very trustworthy and loves her sisters more than anything.
- Kajika Harumi (晴海カジカ, Harumi Kajika) (Voiced by: Maika Takai) is the eleventh idol to be recruited into Nanastar. The second daughter of the Harumi family at 14 years old, she helps manage their fish market with her sisters. Kajika thinks of herself as helpful and polite, but can often be quite careless.
- Shinju Harumi (晴海シンジュ, Harumi Shinju) (Voiced by: Yūki Kuwahara) is the twelfth and final idol of 777 Sisters to be recruited into Nanastar. The youngest daughter of the Harumi family at ten years old, Shinju helps with the family-run fish market Uoharu with her sisters. Despite her age, she is mature and realistic for her age.

=== Casquettes ===
- Sisala Kasumi (川澄シサラ, Kawasumi Shisarā) (Voiced by: Rie Suegara) is an 18-year-old girl who was selected as Tokyo 7th Cinderella Girl 2033 out of a super fierce battle with a total of 200,000 entries.
- Mimi Futagawa (ニ川ミミ, Futagawa Mimi) (Voiced by: Aya Saitō) is a 20-year-old girl with a complex of being an adult, which is rare in Nanastar. She has a lively personality that challenges things with a straight ball. Despite having a driving license, Mimi is bad at driving.
- Chacha Ōtori (鳳チャチャ, Ōtori Chacha) (Voiced by: Yō Taichi) is a young lady with the voice of a samurai. Her family owns an old bookstore.
- Miwako Azami (浅見ミワコ, Azami Miwako) (Voiced by: Kana Yūki) is a 22-year-old young lady who works part-time as a private tutor to be an English teacher.

=== Le-S-Ca ===
- Kyōko Uesugi (上杉・ウエバス・キョーコ, Uesugi Uebasu Kyōko) is a mixed-race child who acts confident in her proportions, but shy when people look closely at her.
- Rena Araki (荒木レナ, Araki Rena)
- Honoka Nishizono (西園ホノカ, Nishizono Honoka)

=== Ci+Lus ===
- Makoto Tamasaka (玉坂マコト, Tamasaka Makoto) (Voiced by: Erii Yamazaki
- Ayumu Orikasa (折笠アユム, Orikasa Ayumu) (Voiced by: Minami Tanaka)

=== The Queen of Purple ===
- Murasaki Echizen (越前ムラサキ, Echīzen Murasaki) (Voiced by: Maiko Nomura)
- Ferb Seto (瀬戸ファーブ, Seto Fābu) (Voiced by: Yuuki Hirose)
- Yumeno Sakaiya (堺屋ユメノ, Sakaiya Yumeno) (Voiced by: Ayano Yamamoto)
- Matsuri Mimori (三森マツリ, Mimori Matsuri) (Voiced by: Yuiko Tatsumi)

=== Nanabana Otome ===
- Tomoe Shiratori (白鳥トモエ, Shiratori Tomoe) (Voiced by: Kumi Takaragi)
- Madoka Enami (榎並マドカ, Enami Madoka) (Voiced by: Maiko Nomura)
- Risyuri Maizono (前園リシュリ, Maezono Risyuri) (Voiced by: Ru Thing)
- Xiao Feihung (シャオ・ヘイフォン, Shao Feifon) (Voiced by: Chisato Mori)
- Miu Aihara (逢原ミウ, Aihara Miu) (Voiced by: Marika Kōno)
- Kumomaki Monaka (雲巻モナカ, Kumomaki Monaka) (Voiced by: Amisa Sakuragi)
- Sawori Yamai (夜舞サヲリ, Yamai Sawori) (Voiced by: Eri Inagawa)

=== Kodomo Rengo ===
- Tasha Romanovsky (ターシャ・ロマノフスキー, Tasha Romanofusukī) (Voiced by: Maria Takakishi)
- Manon Hoshigaki (星柿マノン, Hoshigaki Manon) (Voiced by: Yuri Yamaoka)
- Shirayuki Alice (有栖シラユキ, Arisu Shirayuki) (Voiced by: Natsuki Kita)

=== Others ===
- Kazumi Katsuragi (桂木カヅミ, Katsuragi Kazumi) (Voiced by: Rika Tachibana)
- Jedah Diamond (ジェダ・ダイヤモンド, Jeda Daiyamondo) (Voiced by: Anju Inami)
- Ei Yukuhashi (逝橋エイ, Yukuhashi Ei) (Voiced by: Mao Ichimichi)

=== 4U ===
- Ume Kujō (九条ウメ, Kujō Ume) (Voiced by: Mami Yamashita)
- Emoko Wanibuchi (鰐淵エモコ, Wanibuchi Emoko) (Voiced by: Mayu Yoshioka)
- Hina Saeki (佐伯ヒナ, Saeki Hina) (Voiced by: Maria Naganawa)

=== Karakuri ===
Karakuri is a group consisting of twins Futaba (唐栗フタバ, Karakuri Futaba) and Hitoha Karakuri (唐栗ヒトハ, Karakuri Hitoha) (Voiced by: Akina).

== Film ==
The film is directed by Takayuki Kitagawa, with Masakazu Sunagawa serving as assistant director, Yosuke Kikuchi designing the characters, and Yoshiaki Dewa composing the film's music. The film was originally scheduled to air in summer 2020, but was delayed to Winter 2021 due to the COVID-19 pandemic.
