= Nozomi Furuki =

Japanese voice actress

- 古木 のぞみ
- Born: January 12, 1988 (age 37); Gotō Islands, Nagasaki Prefecture, Japan
- Occupation: Voice actress
- Years active: 2010–present
- Agent: Mausu Promotion

Nozomi Furuki (古木 のぞみ, Furuki Nozomi; born January 12, 1988) is a Japanese voice actress from Gotō Islands, Nagasaki Prefecture. She is a member of the idol voice acting unit One Little Kiss.

== Career ==
Her major voice roles include Chiisana Ojisan as Watashi and Barakamon as Miwa Yamamura. Aside from being a voice performer in the TV anime series Barakamon, she is also the dialect supervisor of the said anime. She is a member of the idol voice acting unit One Little Kiss along with fellow voice actresses Konomi Fujimura, Haruka Mikami, and Chisato Mori. From April 2014, she is affiliated with Mausu Promotion.

== Filmography ==
=== Television animation ===
- Kids on the Slope (2012), Kaoru Nishimi (young), Tokie
- Chiisana Ojisan (2012), Watashi (me)
- Chanpon (2014), Nyamen
- Barakamon (2014), Miwa Yamamura
- Saki: The Nationals (2014), Okisuke Mikuni
- The Seven Deadly Sins (2014), Ellen
- Chaos Dragon (2015), Mashiro Sagura
- Rolling Girls (2015), Yukari Otonashi
- Seiyu's Life! (2015), Aoi Konno
- Seraph of the End (2015), Chess Belle
- Seraph of the End: Battle in Nagoya (2015), Chess Belle
- Show By Rock!! (2015), Kittsun
- Grimgar of Fantasy and Ash (2016), Sassa
- High School Fleet (2016) as Shima Tateishi
- Ojisan to Marshmallow (2016), Junior at Marshmallow Factory
- Scorching Ping Pong Girls (2016), Zakuro Zashikiwarashi
- Princess Principal (2017), Chise (ep. 1, 4 - )
- Trickster (2017), Yuuko Nagashima
- School Babysitters (2018), Kotarō Kashima
- Why the Hell Are You Here, Teacher!? (2019), Takahashi Takashi
- Maesetsu! (2020), Kanae Kanenari
- Loner Life in Another World (2024), Shield Girl

=== Film animation ===
- High School Fleet: The Movie (2020) as Shima Tateishi
- Princess Principal: Crown Handler (2021) as Chise

=== Games ===
- Totemo E Mahjong (2012), Asagiri Mashiro
- Blue Sky Galleon (2013), Heru
- Totemo E Mahjong Plus (2014), Asagiri Mashiro
- Apprentice Witch and Fluffy Friends (2015), Kaede
- Idol Incidents (2015), Viramain Kosasa
- Rainbow Run Girls (2015), Kanna Tachibana
- Sid Story (2016), Brahe
- King's Raid (2018), Rephy

=== Dubbing ===
- Sinister (2013), Ashley Oswalt - film
- Transformers: Prime, Miko Nakadai, Dago R, Dago F - American cartoon series
