= Sayaka Kaneko =

Japanese voice actress and singer

- 金子 彩花
- Born: 13 April
- Occupation: Voice actress
- Years active: 2016–present
- Employer: Office Osawa
- Notable work: Nene in Kakuriyo: Bed & Breakfast for Spirits; Aoi Ichijō in High School Prodigies Have It Easy Even in Another World

Sayaka Kaneko (Japanese: 金子 彩花, Hepburn: Kaneko Sayaka; born 13 April) is a Japanese voice actress from Saitama Prefecture, affiliated with Office Osawa. While a nutrition college student, she attended Sogo Gakuen Human Academy and debuted as a voice actress in 2016, voicing Ilmeria Von Leinweber in Atelier Firis: The Alchemist and the Mysterious Journey and Sora Hirota in High School Fleet. Since then, she has starred as Nene in Kakuriyo: Bed & Breakfast for Spirits and Aoi Ichijō in High School Prodigies Have It Easy Even in Another World.

== Biography ==
Sayaka Kaneko, a native of Saitama Prefecture, was born on 13 April. She attended nighttime and weekend classes at Sogo Gakuen Human Academy's Shibuya campus during her second year as a nutrition college student. She was later admitted into Office Osawa through an internal audition held with their school.

In 2016, Kaneko voiced Ilmeria Von Leinweber in Atelier Firis: The Alchemist and the Mysterious Journey and Sora Hirota in High School Fleet, reprising the latter role in the 2020 film High School Fleet: The Movie. She later starred as Nene in Kakuriyo: Bed & Breakfast for Spirits and Aoi Ichijō in High School Prodigies Have It Easy Even in Another World. In 2021, she voiced Garcia Dekasegi in Cute Executive Officer, Mia in Loopers, Roanna Fontaine in Seirei Gensouki: Spirit Chronicles, and her Cute Executive Officer character song single, Kore ga Koi ne, was released from Fabtone Records on 14 April.

== Filmography ==
=== Animated television ===
Year	Title	Role(s)	Ref
2016	Erased	Aya Nakanishi	
2016	High School Fleet	Sora Hirota	
2017	Idol Time PriPara	Aiko	
2018	Kakuriyo: Bed & Breakfast for Spirits	Nene	
2019	High School Prodigies Have It Easy Even in Another World	Aoi Ichijō	
2021	Bottom-tier Character Tomozaki	Erika Konno	
2021	Cute Executive Officer	Garcia Dekasegi	
2021	Seirei Gensouki: Spirit Chronicles	Roanna Fontaine	
2022	Miss Shachiku and the Little Baby Ghost	Kon	

=== Animated film ===
Year	Title	Role(s)	Ref
2020	High School Fleet: The Movie	Sora Hirota	

=== Video games ===
Year	Title	Role(s)	Ref
2016	Atelier Firis: The Alchemist and the Mysterious Journey	Ilmeria Von Leinweber	
2021	Loopers	Mia	
