= High School Fleet =

2016 Japanese original anime television series

- Promotional poster featuring the character Akeno Misaki and Moeka China

ハイスクール・フリート (Hai Sukūru Furīto)
- Genre: Action
- Created by: Takaaki Suzuki
- Manga

Haifuri
- Illustrated by: Kanari Abe
- Published by: Media Factory
- Magazine: Monthly Comic Alive
- Original run: October 27, 2015 – present
- Volumes: 12
- Manga

High School Fleet: Maidens of Loreley
- Illustrated by: Kanari Abe
- Published by: Media Factory
- Magazine: Monthly Comic Alive
- Original run: June 27, 2016 – August 26, 2017
- Volumes: 3
- Anime television series
- Directed by: Yuu Nobuta
- Produced by: Shinichirou Kashiwada; Tomoyuki Oowada; Jiyuu Ougi; Hiroaki Murakami; Taiki Akasaka; Junichi Kubota; Norikazu Ootsuka; Manabu Jinguuji (OVA)
- Written by: Reiko Yoshida
- Music by: Shigeo Komori
- Studio: Production IMS
- Licensed by: NA: Aniplex of America; UK: Anime Limited
- Original network: Tokyo MX, BS11, GTV, GYT, TVA, KBS, Sun TV, TVh, TVQ, AT-X
- Original run: April 9, 2016 – June 25, 2016
- Episodes: 12 + 2 OVA
- Anime film
- High School Fleet: The Movie (2020)

High School Fleet (ハイスクール・フリート, Hai Sukūru Furīto), also known as Haifuri (はいふり), is a Japanese anime produced by Production IMS. Yuu Nobuta directed the anime and Reiko Yoshida handled the series composition, with character designs by Naoto Nakamura and original character designs by Atto. The series aired in Japan from April to June 2016. A manga adaptation illustrated by Kanari Abe began serialization in Media Factory's seinen manga magazine Monthly Comic Alive's December 2015 issue released the same year on October 27. An anime film produced by A-1 Pictures premiered on January 18, 2020.

== Plot ==
The anime follows a girl named Akeno Misaki who enrolls into Yokosuka Girls' Marine High School (横須賀女子海洋学校, Yokosuka Joshi Kaiyō Gakkō) in Yokosuka, Kanagawa, to become one of the highly regarded Blue Mermaids. As she and her classmates set off aboard the fictional Kagerō-class destroyer Harekaze (晴風), an incident with their instructor suddenly leads them to be accused of mutiny. Therefore, Akeno must lead her crewmates in sailing the Harekaze as they try to find the truth about what is happening while also avoiding pursuit.

== Characters ==
=== Bridge ===
Akeno Misaki (岬 明乃, Misaki Akeno) / Mike (ミケちゃん, Mike-chan)
Voiced by: Shiina Natsukawa
Captain of the destroyer Harekaze, and the series protagonist. Despite not being particularly bright or talented at naval warfare and tactics, Akeno is an effective leader, demonstrating good judgement under pressure. She is especially close with her crew, taking the time to remember all of their names and their roles on their ship. Akeno is afraid of thunder and lightning, stemming from a childhood incident in which she was orphaned after the cruise ship she and her family were on capsized during a storm.
Mashiro Munetani (宗谷 ましろ, Munetani Mashiro) / Shiro (シロちゃん, Shiro-chan)
Voiced by: Lynn
The executive officer and second-in-command of the Harekaze, also known as "Shiro". Mashiro is the daughter of the principal of Yokosuka Marine Girls' High School, and comes from a family with a long history of sailors and naval officers. Mashiro's goal is to become a Blue Mermaid, a member of an international naval peacekeeping force headquartered in Japan. Cool-headed, mature, and perpetually unlucky, Mashiro serves as the perfect foil to her captain. She is ailurophobic, and keeps a large collection of stuffed animals in her cabin.
Shima Tateishi (立石 志摩, Tateishi Shima) / Tama (タマちゃん, Tama-chan)
Voiced by: Nozomi Furuki
The artillery officer of the Harekaze. She is usually quiet, speaks in bursts and likes curry, but her gunnery skills are to a extent where her shots that she calculates are mostly accurate and spot on.
Mei Irizaki (西崎 芽依, Irizaki Mei) / Mei (メイちゃん, Mei-chan)
Voiced by: Atsumi Tanezaki
Mei is the torpedo officer of the Harekaze. She enjoys battle where she is eager to fire the weapons onboard at enemy vessels.
Kōko Nosa (納沙 幸子, Nosa Kōko) / Coco (ココちゃん, Koko-chan)
Voiced by: Yuuko Kurose
Kōko is the secretary of the Harekaze who tends to speak her mind in a dramatic way, including theories and what others may be thinking. She feels that fiction is more real than non-fiction and often lets her tongue and imagination get out of hand. She always gets information out of the tablet she carries whenever they are in a battle and relays it to the bridge crew.
Rin Shiretoko (知床 鈴, Shiretoko Rin) / Rin (リンちゃん, Rin-chan)
Voiced by: Yurika Kubo
Rin is the Chief Navigator of the Harekaze. She is easily scared and always wanting to run away whenever battle draws near, but never does so and uses her abilities to steer the ship to an extent where the crew recognizes her own efforts.

=== Combat ===
Hikari Ogasawara (小笠原 光, Ogasawara Hikari) / Hikari (ヒカリちゃん, Hikari-chan)
Voiced by: Miharu Sawada
Hikari is an artillery officer assigned to the firing command post of the ship.
Michiru Takeda (武田 美千留, Takeda Michiru) / Mitchin (みっちん)
Voiced by: Hitomi Kikuchi
Michiru is an artillery officer assigned to the firing command post of the ship.
Junko Heki (日置 順子, Heki Junko) / Jun (じゅんちゃん, Jun-chan)
Voiced by: Minami Tanaka
Junko is an artillery officer assigned to the firing command post of the ship.
Ritsuko Matsunaga (松永 理都子, Matsunaga Ritsuko) / Ritchan (りっちゃん)
Voiced by: Yuka Maruyama
Ritsuko is an artillery officer assigned to one of the Harekaze's torpedo tubes.
Kayoko Himeji (姫路 果代子, Himeji Kayoko) / Kayo (かよちゃん, Kayo-chan)
Voiced by: Rui Tanabe
Kayoko is an artillery officer assigned to one of the Harekaze's torpedo tubes.
Kaede Marikōji (万里小路 楓, Marikōji Kaede) / Marikōji (まりこうじさん, Marikōji-san)
Voiced by: Sakura Nakamura
Sonar Personnel as well as the Bugler of the ship, Marikōji is surprisingly skilled with naginata techniques.

=== Navigation ===
Satoko Katsuta (勝田 聡子, Katsuta Satoko) / Sato (サトちゃん, Sato-chan)
Voiced by: Chisato Satsuki
Satoko is a navigation officer and the interim helmsman of the Harekaze. She is often candid and unafraid to be straightforward, and tends to end her sentences with "zona".
Hideko Yamashita (山下 秀子, Yamashita Hideko) / Shū (しゅうちゃん, Shū-chan)
Voiced by: Yō Taichi
Hideko is a navigation officer assigned to the port-side of the ship. She's always seen with her eyes closed.
Mayumi Uchida (内田 まゆみ, Uchida Mayumi) / Mayu (まゆちゃん, Mayu-chan)
Voiced by: Emi Miyajima
Mayumi is a navigation officer assigned to the Starboard-side of the ship.
Tsugumi Yagi (八木 鶫, Yagi Tsugumi) / Tsugu (つぐちゃん, Tsugu-chan)
Voiced by: Nanami Yamashita
Sonar technician of the ship, Tsugumi is quite skilled in communication.
Megumi Uda (宇田 慧, Uda Megumi) / Meg (めぐちゃん, Megu-chan)
Voiced by: Akane Fujita
Machiko Noma (野間 マチコ, Noma Machiko) / Matchy (マッチ, Matchi)
Voiced by: Yū Kobayashi
Machiko is the look-out of the Harekaze with hyperopia, thus wears glasses. She is quite skilled at shooting squirt guns.

=== Engineering ===
Maron Yanagiwara (柳原 麻侖, Yanagiwara Maron) / Maron (マロンちゃん, Maron-chan)
Voiced by: Natsumi Takamori
Chief of engineering of the Harekaze, Maron the shortest among her staff.
Hiromi Kuroki (黒木 洋美, Kuroki Hiromi) / Kuro (クロちゃん, Kuro-chan)
Voiced by: Natsuki Aikawa
Hiromi is the assistant engineer of the Harekaze and Maron's best friend. She is one of the more mature-looking members of the crew. Hiromi is quite skilled in sumo wrestling.
Reo Wakasa (若狭 麗緒, Wakasa Reo) / Reo (レオちゃん, Reo-chan)
Voiced by: Ayaka Shimizu
Reo is one of the Harekaze's engineer who likes to play cards and gossiping.
Sakura Ise (伊勢 桜良, Ise Sakura) / Sakura (サクラちゃん, Sakura-chan)
Voiced by: Sanae Fuku
Sakura is one of the Harekaze's engineer who likes to play cards and talk rumors.
Runa Suruga (駿河 留奈, Suruga Runa) / Luna (ルナちゃん, Runa-chan)
Voiced by: Ari Ozawa
Runa is of the Harekaze's engineer who likes to play cards and gossiping.
Sora Hirota (広田 空, Hirota Sora) / Sora (ソラちゃん, Sora-chan)
Voiced by: Sayaka Kaneko
Sora is of the Harekaze's engineer who likes to play cards and spread rumors.
Hime Wazumi (和住 媛萌, Wazumi Hime) / Hime (ひめちゃん, Hime-chan)
Voiced by: Hiyori Nitta
Hime is an engineering officer assigned to check for ship damage and supplies.
Momo Aoki (青木 百々, Aoki Momo) / Momo (モモちゃん, Momo-chan)
Voiced by: Ayuru Ōhashi
Momo is an engineering officer assigned to check for ship damage and supplies.

=== Logistics ===
Mimi Tōmatsu (等松 美海, Tōmatsu Mimi) / Mimi (ミミちゃん, Mimi-chan)
Voiced by: Airi Ōtsu
Mimi is head of Logistics with an affection for the ship's look-out Matchy.
Mikan Irako (伊良子 美甘, Irako Mikan) / Mikan (ミカンちゃん, Mikan-chan)
Voiced by: Momo Asakura
Mikan is the head cook of the Harekaze.
Homare Kinesaki (杵崎 ほまれ, Kinesaki Homare) / Hotchan (ほっちゃん)
Voiced by: Kanae Itō
Homare is one of the Harekaze's chefs and Akane's twin sister.
Akane Kinesaki (杵崎 あかね, Kinesaki Akane) / Atchan (あっちゃん)
Voiced by: Kanae Itō
Akane is one of the Harekaze's chefs and Homare's twin sister.
Minami Kaburagi (鏑木 美波, Kaburagi Minami) / Kaburagi (鏑木さん, Kaburagi-san)
Voiced by: Kana Asumi
Kaburagi is the medic of the Harekaze. Known as the first genius graduating from the Marine medical university, she is on board to complete her sea training. Her investigation on the virus-carrying creature that infected the Chief artillery officer and causing the other ships to go astray led her to develop an antibody to solve the virus problem. She usually gives Akeno advice and likes to say Chinese proverbs and idioms.

=== Others ===
Moeka China (知名 もえか, China Moeka) / Moka (もかちゃん, Moka-chan)
Voiced by: Sora Amamiya
Akeno's childhood friend and captain of the Musashi.
Wilhelmina Braunschweig Ingenohl Friedeburg (ヴィルヘルミーナ・ブラウンシュヴァイク・インゲノール・フリーデブルク, Viruherumīna Buraunshuvaiku Ingenōru Furīdeburuku) / Mi (ミーちゃん, Mī-chan)
Voiced by: Hiromi Igarashi
Wilhelmina is a student of Wilhelmshaven Maritime High School and deputy captain of the German cruiser Admiral Graf Spee. She is rescued by Akeno after she fled from her ship and joins her on the Harekaze but the real reason was that her captain ordered her to escape in order not to fall victim to the virus infection that spread to the whole ship. An expert on anti-submarine warfare, she later becomes Mashiro's roommate and an assistant to the bridge crew in their journey.
Kaoru Furushō (古庄 薫, Furushō Kaoru)
Voiced by: Megumi Toyoguchi
Kaoru is captain of the Sarushima who teaches the students of the Harekaze. At the start of sea training, she attacked them but is unable to remember why after coming to her senses. It was later found out that it was due to a virus-infected rodent-like creature.
Mayuki Munetani (宗谷 真雪, Munetani Mayuki)
Voiced by: Yūko Kaida
The principal of Naval Academy and Mashiro's mother.
Mashimo Munetani (宗谷 真霜, Munetani Mashimo)
Voiced by: Mai Nakahara
Mashiro's older sister and a member of the Blue Mermaids.
Mafuyu Munetani (宗谷 真冬, Munetani Mafuyu)
Voiced by: Chisa Yuuki
Mashiro's older sister and a member of the Blue Mermaids.
Isoroku (五十六)
Voiced by: Satoshi Tsuruoka
Isoroku is a cat who lives on the Harekaze's bridge. He is seemingly immune to the effects of the virus, therefore handling infected rodent-like creatures without problems.

== Media ==
=== Anime ===
The anime series, produced by Production IMS, was broadcast in Japan from April 9 to June 25, 2016, and was simulcast by Crunchyroll, Daisuki, and Funimation. The series was directed by Yuu Nobuta and written by Reiko Yoshida, with original character designs by Atto and character designs by Naoto Nakamura. The opening theme is "High Free Spirits" by TrySail while the ending theme is "Ripple Effect" by Luna Haruna. A character song single titled "Watashi-tachi Kinenbi" (わたしたち記念日; "Our Anniversary") performed by Shiina Natsukawa and Sora Amamiya was released on April 6, 2016. The series is licensed in North America by Aniplex of America. The anime has been licensed in the UK by Anime Limited. A two-part original video animation project was released between March 31 and May 24, 2017. In 2017, scholar Takayoshi Yamamura noted that the series was produced in the collaboration with the JMSDF. Yamamura further explained that the series worked with the Kanagawa Provincial Cooperation Office to make a recruiting poster for JSDF members and noted that the JMSDF used their official Twitter account to emphasize their active collaboration, with criticism of them for being "too outspoken."

==== Episode list ====
No.	Title	Original release date
1	"In a Pinch on Our Maiden Voyage!"; Transliteration: "Hatsu Kōkai de Pinchi!" (Japanese: 初航海でピンチ！)	April 9, 2016
Admiring female Marines known as the Blue Mermaids since childhood, Akeno Misaki enrolls at Yokosuka Girls' Marine High School in order to become one herself. After briefly reuniting with her childhood friend Moeka China, who is assigned as captain on the ship Musashi, Akeno is assigned as captain on the destroyer ship Harekaze, much to the ire of Deputy Captain Mashiro Munetani. As the ships head off towards nautical lessons, the Harekaze, which is running late due to engine troubles, suddenly comes under attack from the instructor's ship, the Sarushima. After narrowly evading attacks with no response from the instructor, Akeno makes the decision to launch a dummy torpedo at the Sarushima so they can safely retreat. However, this leads to the Sarushima reporting that the Harekaze has mutinied.
2	"In a Pinch During the Pursuit!"; Transliteration: "Tsuigekisarete Pinchi!" (Japanese: 追撃されてピンチ！)	April 16, 2016
After looking over the damage done during their encounter with the Sarushima, the Harekaze starts making its way to the nearest port in the hopes of explaining themselves to the authorities. Along the way, however, they come under pursuit from the German pocket battleship Admiral Graf Spee. Faced with unfavorable battle odds, Akeno comes up with the idea to use the smoke from the ship's funnel as a smokescreen in order to get a shot in. During this, a small craft leaving the Graf Spee gets hit in the crossfire, prompting Akeno to set out and rescue its pilot. After the Harekaze gets to safety with the pilot in tow, Akeno receives a distress call from Moeka, telling her that the Musashi is in danger.
3	"In a Pinch in Pajamas!"; Transliteration: "Pajama de Pinchi!" (Japanese: パジャマでピンチ！)	April 23, 2016
As Akeno becomes worried about Moeka's distress call, the Harekaze intercepts a message reporting the ship's alleged mutiny. Later that night, the ship comes across the I-201, a submarine from Toumai marine boys' high school and attempts to send a message to them, only to once again come under attack. As the girls try to evade the submarine's torpedoes, the rescued German pilot, Wilhelmina Braunschweig Ingelner Friedeburg, wakes up and helps the crew fight off the submarine. After managing to escape, Wilhelmina informs Akeno that something on the Spee caused her crew to stop obeying orders. As the ship receives orders from Yokosuka's principal to return to school, Wilhelmina moves into Mashiro's room.
4	"Maidens in a Pinch!"; Transliteration: "Otome no Pinchi!" (Japanese: 乙女のピンチ！)	April 30, 2016
Needing more supplies for the ship, particularly toilet paper, Akeno and a few others make an excursion to a nearby ocean shopping mall. Meanwhile, as Mashiro has worries about being compared to her mother, the principal, a peculiar rodent is picked up on the ship. Just as the girls get their supplies, they are confronted by some Blue Mermaids who capture Akeno. As ships surround the Harekaze, Shima Tateishi suddenly becomes possessed by something and starts shooting at the other ships until Wilhelmina stops her. Afterwards, it is revealed the ships are those of the Safety Oversight Office, who believe in the Harekaze's innocence and give them some supplies. Meanwhile, the rodent that was found in the box picked up earlier is sent to the medical room, where Minami decides to investigate it, believing it to be not a hamster or a rat.
5	"Pinched by the Musashi!"; Transliteration: "Musashi de Pinchi!" (Japanese: 武蔵でピンチ！)	May 7, 2016
As the Harekaze takes a well-earned break, the Blue Mermaids interview the instructor who attacked the Harekaze, Kaoru Furushou, who can't remember what drove her to do so, while Akeno talks with Rin, who is worried about her cowardly personality. Meanwhile, a group of instructor ships from Toumai Marine boys high school go to investigate the Musashi, only to suddenly come under attack from it. Back at the Harekaze, as the girls hold a welcoming party for Wilhelmina, they are requested to investigate the situation with the Musashi. Despite Mashiro's warning, Akeno goes off on her own to rescue Moeka, but crashes her skipper just as she gets near.
6	"In a Mined Pinch!"; Transliteration: "Kirai de Pinchi!" (Japanese: 機雷でピンチ！)	May 14, 2016
Upon returning to the Harekaze, Akeno takes a bath with the engineers, sharing her worries about Moeka with Wilhelmina and Rin. Later, Minami discovers that the cause of their electrical equipment malfunctioning was the rodent, which was carrying a virus that caused Shima to act the way she did earlier. The Harekaze soon finds itself surrounded by mines, prompting the crew to do some minesweeping. When the two skipper crew, Kayoko Himeji and Ritsuko Matsunaga, get caught up in an underwater explosion, Rin manages to convince Mashiro to let her and Akeno set out to safely rescue them. Meanwhile, Minami decides to try an antibody she created for the virus on herself.
7	"In a Stormy Pinch!"; Transliteration: "Arashi de Pinchi!" (Japanese: 嵐でピンチ！)	May 21, 2016
Due to a shortage, the crew has to conserve water by drinking ramune and using seawater for showers and cleaning until they can replenish supplies. They soon run into some luck when they come across some rain, only for it to suddenly turn into a storm. This leads Akeno to reveal that she has a fear of lightning, as it reminds her of the day she became separated from her parents during a shipwreck, whose whereabouts are still unknown. The Harekaze soon learns of a stranded mall ship and are sent to help evacuate its passengers. As Mashiro and Wilhelmina lead a rescue party, Mashiro gets caught up in a flood while rescuing a cat named Tamonmaru. Just as Mashiro laments her bad luck, she is rescued by the Blue Mermaids, who take Minami's antibody with them, while Tamonmaru's owners deciding to let him stay with Mashiro aboard the Harekaze. After the rescue mission, the Harekaze sails through a fog not knowing another ship was just near them.
8	"In a Pinch with the Hiei!"; Transliteration: "Hiei de Pinchi!" (Japanese: 比叡でピンチ！)	May 28, 2016
While sailing out of the fog, the Harekaze encounters another ship of their school. Initially assuming to be the Musashi, it turns out to be the Hiei. The school orders the ship to monitor the Hiei while avoiding being hit as reinforcements from the Blue Mermaids were deployed, arriving in four hours. The crew realizes that their course was leading to a residential area and worries that the infection will spread from the Hiei to the residents. Meanwhile, Mashimo visits her mother, the principal at the school explaining the source of the infection and how it began. Meanwhile, Akeno devises a strategy and receives permission from the principal to execute it in order to stop the Hiei. The plan was successful with the Hiei running aground and the Blue Mermaids arrive, led by Mashiro's other elder sister, Mafuyu.
9	"Mina in a Pinch!"; Transliteration: "Mīna de Pinchi!" (Japanese: ミーナでピンチ！)	June 4, 2016
Upon splitting up with the Blue Mermaids to investigate two large ships headed in different locations, the Harekaze come across the Admiral Spee, Wilhelmina's ship. The Harekaze launches an attack on the Spee in an attempt to stop it, only to find it is not trying to evade their torpedoes, keeping them from targeting their weak point. Remember her last encounter with the Spee, Akeno, Wilhelmina, and some others take skippers to sneak aboard while the Harekaze distracts it. As Akeno's group make their way past the infected Spee crew, Wilhelmina faces off against her captain, Thea Kreutzer, and Kaburagi manages to administer with the vaccine, stopping the Spee's attack. As Wilhelmina returns to Spee, she has a tearful farewell with Coco.
10	"Happy at the Equator Festival!"; Transliteration: "Sekidōsai de Happī!" (Japanese: 赤道祭でハッピー！)	June 11, 2016
Since Harekaze reached the equator, engineer Maron Yanagiwara decides to organize an Equator Festival on the Harekaze. Meanwhile, the Blue Mermaids prepare an operation to distribute the antibody to the other infected ships, requesting help from the other students. As the day approaches, Maron becomes upset when she finds that no one seems to be excited for the festival. She soon cheers up when Hime Wazumi builds a palanquin for the event, and the other girls soon start getting into it. The festivities soon get underway with various performances and attractions, including a play, a sumo tournament, and finally a sing-along.
11	"In a Pinch with a Battleship's Big Cannon!"; Transliteration: "Daikan Kyohō de Pinchi!" (Japanese: 大艦巨砲でピンチ！)	June 18, 2016
Akeno becomes anxious over putting her crewmates in danger again as the Harekaze is sent to pursue the Musashi. While the Blue Mermaids try to rescue and stop the Musashi, Moeka, who has been trapped on the bridge with a few crewmates, recalls how the rest of her crew became infected and took control over the ship. As the Blue Mermaids ships begin to diminish under the Musashi's firepower, Akeno expresses her fears about letting her crewmates get hurt. Receiving some advice from Maron, Mashiro and the rest of the crew give Akeno their support, encouraging her to take action and head off to rescue the Musashi.
12	"In a Pinch with the Last Battle!"; Transliteration: "Rasuto Batoru de Pinchi!" (Japanese: ラストバトルでピンチ！)	June 25, 2016
The Harekaze begin their approach towards the Musashi, launching all of its torpedoes at the stern to slow it down. As the Harekaze take heavy damage from the Musashi's heavy firepower, they are aided by the arrival of their school's ships including Hiei, Maikaze, Hamakaze, Graf Spee (Wilhelmina's ship), and Tenjin (instructor Furushou's ship). With everyone's support, the Harekaze launches a rocket to create a smoke screen over the Musashi, allowing them to board the ship, leading to a long-awaited reunion between Akeno and Moeka. After returning everyone safely home, the Harekaze sinks at dockside as a result of all the damage it took, earning everyone's respect and honor for the journey it went through.
OVA–1	"Kōko Nosa in a Pinch!"; Transliteration: "Kōko Nosa de Pinchi!" (Japanese: 納沙幸子がピンチ！)	March 31, 2017
Following the incident, Coco, concerned over rumors that the Harekaze class may be dissolved due to lacking a ship, is tasked with delivering sealed orders from the principal to all of her classmates during their time off from school. As Coco's unease causes the rumor to spread further, many of the Harekaze students start getting scouted by the other ships. Convinced that the sealed orders are transfer notices, Coco confides in Wilhelmina, who offers to let her transfer to her ship in such an event.
OVA–2	"Kōko Nosa Still in a Pinch!?"; Transliteration: "Kōko Nosa mo Pinchi!?" (Japanese: 納沙幸子もピンチ！？)	May 24, 2017
Worried that the sealed orders dissolves the Harekaze class, Coco launches a petition to prevent it. Coco goes around asking for signatures with little success. After asking Minami, she decides to hold a special event to draw in people to sign it. Coco and her classmates set up a festival and the event is successful. At the designated time, the class assembles to open the sealed envelope, and the orders state that the class has been reassigned to a new ship, the Y469. The ship is equipped and furnished with items from their old ship that was lifted out of the sea. While the ship was going to be named the Okikaze, Akeno is given the right to name the ship and calls it the Harekaze II. The class heads out to sea for their next adventure while paying their respects to their old ship as they pass by.

=== Video game ===
A smartphone game for iOS and Android devices titled High School Fleet: Kantai Battle de Pinch! (ハイスクール・フリート 艦隊バトルでピンチ！, Hai Sukūru Furīto: Kantai Batoru de Pinchi!) has been announced for release in 2018. It was later pushed back to Spring 2019 due to the need for refinement. Pre-registration began at the same time as the initial announcement. The video game was officially released on March 27, 2019. An announcement was made on February 26, 2020, that the game would be ending service on March 25 at 2:00 pm JST.

Aniplex partnered with Wargaming to bring the world and characters of High School Fleet to the online video game World of Warships

=== Film ===
The official website announced the production of an anime film on April 7, 2018. The film is produced by A-1 Pictures and directed by Jun Nakagawa, with Yuu Nobuta serving as chief director. Takaaki Suzuki and Kunihiko Okada are credited as the film's scriptwriters. The rest of the main staff and cast from the anime series are returning to reprise their roles. It was released in Japan on January 18, 2020.
