= High School Fleet: The Movie =

2020 Japanese animated film by Jun Nakagawa

- Theatrical release poster
- Kanji: 劇場版 ハイスクール・フリート
- Revised Hepburn: Gekijōban Hai Sukūru Furīto
- Directed by: Jun Nakagawa; Yuu Nobuta (Note: Credited as Chief director (総監督, Sō kantoku).)
- Screenplay by: Takaaki Suzuki; Kunihiko Okada
- Story by: Takaaki Suzuki
- Produced by: Manabu Jinguuji; Gorou Ishida; Taiki Akasaka; Junichi Kubota; Tomoyuki Ōwada
- Starring: Shiina Natsukawa; Lynn; Nozomi Furuki; Atsumi Tanezaki; Yuuko Kurose; Yurika Kubo; Sora Amamiya; Naomi Ōzora; Minami Takahashi; Maria Naganawa; Tomori Kusunoki; Satomi Amano; Miyu Tomita; Sayumi Suzushiro
- Cinematography: Hayashi Koujirou
- Edited by: Yoshitake Masato
- Music by: Komori Shigeo
- Production company: A-1 Pictures
- Distributed by: Aniplex
- Release dates: January 12, 2020 (Tokyo); January 18, 2020 (Japan)
- Running time: 105 minutes
- Country: Japan
- Language: Japanese
- Box office: ¥67 million (US$628,552)

High School Fleet: The Movie (Japanese: 劇場版 ハイスクール・フリート, Hepburn: Gekijōban Hai Sukūru Furīto) is a 2020 Japanese animated film and sequel to High School Fleet (2016) and its 2017 original video animation (OVA). Produced by A-1 Pictures and distributed by Aniplex, the film is directed by Jun Nakagawa from a script written by Takaaki Suzuki and Kunihiko Okada, and features an ensemble cast that includes Shiina Natsukawa, Lynn, Nozomi Furuki, Atsumi Tanezaki, Yuuko Kurose, Yurika Kubo, Sora Amamiya, Naomi Ōzora, Minami Takahashi, Maria Naganawa, Tomori Kusunoki, Satomi Amano, Miyu Tomita, and Sayumi Suzushiro. Set three months after the events of the OVA, the film follows the crew of Harekaze II ship during a festival participated by various girls' maritime schools when a ship hijacking takes place.

An anime film based on the High School Fleet franchise was announced in April 2018. A-1 Pictures took over the animation production of the film from Production IMS in April 2019. That month, the cast and staff of the franchise's 2016 anime television series were announced to be returning for the film.

High School Fleet: The Movie premiered in Tokyo on January 12, 2020, and was released in Japan on January 18. The film grossed ¥67 million at the box office.

== Plot ==
The ship crew of Harekaze II welcomes the students of Kure, Maizuru, and Sasebo maritime high schools for the upcoming inter-high tournament in Yokosuka. (Note: Set three months after the events of the two-episode original video animation of High School Fleet.) After visiting different stalls set up by their classmates for the welcome festival, Akeno Misaki and Mashiro Munetani befriend a foreigner named Susan Reyes. Later, school instructor Kaoru Furushou, having received a recommendation from the crew of Hiei to promote Mashiro as their captain, discusses the matter with Akeno and Mashiro, leading to tension and uneasiness between the two. The following day, Blue Mermaids receive a report about the floating water purification plant and sea fortress being hijacked by pirates to set up their mobile sea base, while Susan infiltrates a massive float that is scheduled for scrapping to block the Blue Mermaids from leaving the city's harbor.

In a hospital, Susan admits to being coerced by the pirates in exchange for their help in looking for her father in Japan. Akeno, Mashiro, and Moeka China join the Blue Mermaids and other girls' maritime high schools in a mission to stop the two floating facilities from rendezvousing. Benten and Admiral Graf Spee successfully rescue the hostages of the plant and capture the pirates. Blue Mermaids and the high school fleet join the all-male White Dolphins in their assault on the fortress. As the fortress fires back, Akeno decides to infiltrate it due to Harekaze II's size to fit through the small hole opened from the bombardment of the high school fleet's four Yamato-class flagships. With Susan's knowledge of the fortress' interior, Harekaze II successfully disables the fortress. After the mission, Mashiro tells Akeno her desire to stay with the crew to earn more experience while still aiming to become a captain.

== Voice cast ==
- Shiina Natsukawa as Akeno Misaki
- Lynn as Mashiro Munetani
- Nozomi Furuki as Shima Tateishi
- Atsumi Tanezaki as Mei Irizaki
- Yuuko Kurose as Kouko Nosa
- Yurika Kubo as Rin Shiretoko
- Miharu Sawada as Hikari Ogasawara
- Hitomi Kikuchi as Michiru Takeda
- Minami Tanaka as Junko Heki
- Yuka Maruyama as Ritsuko Matsunaga
- Rui Tanabe as Kayoko Himeji
- Sakura Nakamura as Kaede Marikouji
- Chisato Satsuki as Satoko Katsuta
- Yō Taichi as Hideko Yamashita
- Emi Miyajima as Mayumi Uchida
- Nanami Yamashita as Tsugumi Yagi
- Akane Fujita as Megumi Uda
- Yū Kobayashi as Machiko Noma
- Natsumi Takamori as Maron Yanagiwara
- Natsuki Aikawa as Hiromi Kuroki
- Ayaka Shimizu as Reo Wakasa
  - Shimizu also voiced Yui Fujita
- Sanae Fuku as Sakura Ise
  - Fuku also voiced Sango Sugimoto
- Ari Ozawa as Runa Suruga
- Sayaka Kaneko as Sora Hirota
- Hiyori Nitta as Hime Wazumi
- Ayuru Ōhashi as Momo Aoki
- Momo Asakura as Mikan Irako
- Kanae Itō as the Kinesaki twin sisters Akane and Homare
- Airi Ōtsu as Mimi Toumatsu
- Kana Asumi as Minami Kaburagi
- Sora Amamiya as Moeka China
- Naomi Ōzora as Susan Reyes
- Satoshi Tsuruoka as Isoroku
- Hiromi Igarashi as Wilhelmina Braunschweig Ingenohl Friedeburg
- Chitose Morinaga as Thea Kreutzer
- Minami Takahashi as Tōmi Miyazato
- Maria Naganawa as Shia Nomura
- Tomori Kusunoki as Azumi Abe
- Satomi Amano as Tsubame Kawano
- Miyu Tomita as Sachiho Chiba
- Sayumi Suzushiro as Keiko Nogiwa

== Production ==
The official Twitter account of High School Fleet announced various projects and programs in the works in February 2017, but the staff did not specify their types. The franchise's official website announced the production of an anime film in April 2018. Production IMS, the franchise's animation studio, filed for bankruptcy with the Tokyo District Court in September 2018. Despite the studio's closure the following month, the production of the film was not yet canceled, with the franchise's official website remaining active. The film's title and logo were revealed in March 2019. In April 2019, A-1 Pictures was announced as the new animation studio for the film that was set to release the following year.

In April 2019, Jun Nakagawa was revealed to be directing the film with screenwriters Kunihiko Okada and Takaaki Suzuki, who was credited for the original concept, while Yuu Nobuta, director of the franchise's 2016 anime series, returned as the chief director. In the same month, the cast of the anime series were revealed to be returning for the film. Additional cast for the film were announced in October 2019, including Minami Takahashi as Tōmi Miyazato, Maria Naganawa as Shia Nomura, Tomori Kusunoki as Azumi Abe, Satomi Amano as Tsubame Kawano, Miyu Tomita as Sachiho Chiba, and Sayumi Suzushiro as Keiko Nogiwa. Naomi Ōzora was also revealed as part of the cast to voice the new character Susan Reyes in December 2019.

== Music ==
Shigeo Komori was announced to be composing High School Fleet: The Movie in April 2019, after previously doing so for High School Fleet (2016) and its two-episode OVA released in 2017. In October 2019, TrySail was announced to be performing the theme song of the film titled "Free Turn".

High School Fleet: The Movie – Original Soundtrack track listing
No.	Title	Length
1.	"Welcome! To Yokosuka!"	0:36
2.	"Inspection"	1:12
3.	"Wild Match"	1:15
4.	"Great Heroic Story"	1:28
5.	"Synchro"	0:36
6.	"Sue-chan"	0:57
7.	"Obstacle Navigation"	2:57
8.	"Indiscriminate Water Battle"	2:21
9.	"Exercise Caution Overhead"	1:08
10.	"Disquieting Movement"	0:36
11.	"Secret Strategy"	1:15
12.	"Ready for Departure"	1:55
13.	"All Ships Depart!"	6:02
14.	"Infiltration Strategy!"	2:34
15.	"Counterattack!"	3:57
16.	"Rushed Strategy"	0:58
17.	"Harekaze Charge"	2:25
18.	"Harekaze Pinch"	2:38
19.	"Hyper Drift Turn"	0:57
Total length:		35:47

== Marketing ==
A trailer announcing the production of High School Fleet: The Movie was released in April 2018. A teaser key visual and trailer for the film were released in April 2019. The film received a new trailer in June 2019, followed by its second key visual in August. In October 2019, another trailer and the third key visual for the film were released. The final key visual and trailer for the film were released in December 2019.

The film was scheduled to hold a collaboration event with the dolphinarium Keikyu Aburatsubo Marine Park in October 2019, but it was later moved to December due to Typhoon Hagibis. Other promotional partners for the film included Yokohama Hakkeijima Sea Paradise, Aomi Coffee, Disk City Entertainment (DiCE) Internet cafe, and Lawson.

== Release ==
=== Theatrical ===
High School Fleet: The Movie held its premiere at the United Cinemas Toyosu theater in Tokyo on January 12, 2020, and was released in 96 theaters in Japan on January 18. It was reported that the second part of the film had uncorrected parts from the original key animation due to tight deadlines following A-1 Pictures' take over. A new version of the film, with 400 cuts fixed, was released in 2D and 4DX on February 14, 2020.

=== Home media ===
High School Fleet: The Movie was released on Blu-ray and DVD in Japan on October 28, 2020. They include a special booklet supervised by Suzuki, the film's original soundtrack, and a newly-recorded drama CD. The film was broadcast in Japan on BS11 on January 1, 2022.

== Reception ==
High School Fleet: The Movie grossed ¥67 million (US$628,552) in Japan. The film ranked tenth in its opening weekend, placing behind Made in Abyss: Dawn of the Deep Soul (2020).
