= Kuma Kuma Kuma Bear =

Japanese light novel series

- First light novel volume cover of Kuma Kuma Kuma Bear, featuring Yuna

くまクマ熊ベアー (Kuma Kuma Kuma Beā)
- Genre: Fantasy comedy; Isekai; Iyashikei
- Novel series
- Written by: Kumanano
- Published by: Shōsetsuka ni Narō
- Original run: October 13, 2014 – present
- Light novel
- Written by: Kumanano
- Illustrated by: 029
- Published by: Shufu to Seikatsu Sha
- English publisher: NA: Seven Seas Entertainment
- Imprint: PASH! Books
- Original run: May 29, 2015 – present
- Volumes: 21
- Manga
- Written by: Kumanano
- Illustrated by: Sergei
- Published by: Shufu to Seikatsu Sha
- English publisher: NA: Seven Seas Entertainment
- Magazine: Comic PASH!
- Original run: March 28, 2018 – present
- Volumes: 14
- Manga

Kuma Kuma Kuma Beā 〜 Kyō mo Kuma Kuma Biyori 〜
- Written by: Kumanano
- Illustrated by: Yukinori Satō
- Published by: Shufu to Seikatsu Sha
- Magazine: PASH UP!
- Original run: September 16, 2020 – August 10, 2022
- Volumes: 2
- Manga

Kuma Kuma Kuma Beā Gaiden 〜 Yuna no Yorimichi Techō 〜
- Written by: Kumanano
- Illustrated by: Rinen Takizawa
- Published by: Shufu to Seikatsu Sha
- Magazine: PASH UP!
- Original run: December 28, 2022 – present
- Volumes: 5
- Anime television series
- Directed by: Hisashi Ishii; Yuu Nobuta
- Written by: Takashi Aoshima
- Music by: Shigeo Komori
- Studio: EMT Squared
- Licensed by: Crunchyroll (Note: In North America through Crunchyroll, LLC (formerly known as Funimation).); SA/SEA: Muse Communication
- Original network: AT-X, Tokyo MX, BS11, SUN, KBS
- Original run: October 7, 2020 – June 19, 2023
- Episodes: 24
- icon

Kuma Kuma Kuma Bear (くまクマ熊ベアー, Kuma Kuma Kuma Beā) (Note: The Japanese title consists of kuma–the native Japanese word for "bear"—written three ways, followed by "bear" loaned from English.) is a Japanese light novel series written by Kumanano and illustrated by 029. It began serialization online in 2014 on the user-generated novel publishing website Shōsetsuka ni Narō. It was later acquired by Shufu to Seikatsu Sha, who have published twenty-one volumes since May 2015 under their PASH! Books imprint.

A manga adaptation with art by Sergei has been serialized online via Shufu to Seikatsu Sha's Comic PASH! website since 2018 and has been collected in fourteen tankōbon volumes. Both the light novel and manga are licensed in North America by Seven Seas Entertainment. An anime television series adaptation produced by EMT Squared aired from October to December 2020. A second season aired from April to June 2023.

== Premise ==
Yuna is a bored teenage girl who spends her time as a NEET and living off money she makes in the stock market, being mooched off by her parents. While playing her favorite FPV online game World Fantasy Online, Yuna receives an embarrassing bear suit as a gift for playing so long. The administrator of the game turns out to be a God, who based the game on her world. She then transports Yuna into said world without a real warning with the bear suit, which she is powerless without as it grants her special powers. Despite her initial anger at being teleported without consent, and that there is no way back to her old world, Yuna quickly adapts and finds her new life more fulfilling than the empty one back on Earth as her actions cause her to rise in fame.

== Characters ==
Yuna (ユナ)
Voiced by: Maki Kawase (Japanese); Marissa Lenti (English)
Yuna is a 15-year-old girl who lives by herself. Given her finances, she chose to become socially withdrawn at age twelve to play World Fantasy Online as much as possible, and was eventually transported to an alternate world that is identical to the game itself. She decides to enjoy her new life in the new world since she did not have any reason to go back to her original world (as there is no way back), though she loathes the fact God made all her powers be linked to an embarrassing bear suit, which also comes with bear-like gloves and shoes that resemble bear feet. Underneath her bear suit is bear underwear that never gets dirty. She has to use bear imagery with her magic to make it stronger. To her frustrated resignation, Yuna finds everyone uses the motif of her suit for things associated with her. She soon becomes famous for her heroics and is adored by many young women and royals. She is good friends with Fina, Noa, Shuri, Misa, Flora, and Shia.
Yuna had her fortune transported with her, leaving her very rich; though she's frugal enough to not spend unless she needs to.
Fina (フィナ)
Voiced by: Azumi Waki (Japanese); Xanthe Huynh (English)
Fina is a 10-year-old girl and a resident of the town of Crimonia. Having been forced to care for the family at a very young age, she is very responsible and mature. As noted by her mother and Yuna, Fina has an unusual mentality for a 10-year-old. She met Yuna after she rescued her from wolves and later became her work partner. Thanks to Yuna having a ridiculously amount of monsters for her to harvest, courtesy of her item bag, Fina is no longer hurting for money; getting 50% of all harvested material sales. Her closeness to Yuna shows that Fina thinks of her as family as she likes being around her. She has also formed good friendships with Noa and Misa.
Noire Foschurose (ノアール・フォシュローゼ, Noāru Foshurōze)
Voiced by: Rina Hidaka (Japanese); AmaLee (English)
Noire is a 10-year-old girl and noble who resides in the town of Crimonia; she met Yuna after hearing reports of her from the adventurers guild. She has an older sister named Shia Foschurose. She loves Yuna's bears more than anything; having founded the Miss Bear Fan Club in appreciation. Her nickname is "Noa".
She appreciates Fina being her friend despite social differences. She is also good friends with Misa.
Shuri (シュリ)
Voiced by: Miyu Tomita (Japanese); Jalitza Delgado (English)
Shuri is Fina's younger sister and daughter of Telmina. Shuri is often makes silly assumptions and is known for being fearless. She is also a good friend to Yuna.
Misana Farrengram (ミサーナ・ファーレングラム, Misāna Fārenguramu)
Voiced by: Satomi Amano (Japanese); Felecia Angelle (English)
Misana is Gran Farrengram's granddaughter. Her nickname is "Misa". She is good friends with Yuna, Fina, and Noa. Like Noa, she adores Yuna's bears.
Shia Foschurose (シア・フォシュローゼ, Shia Foshurōze)
Voiced by: Inori Minase (Japanese); Megan Shipman (English)
Shia is a 15-year-old girl who is Noire's elder sister and the daughter of Cliff and Eleanora Foschurose. She currently lives together with her mother in the Royal Capital and attends the Royal Academy, while her sister and father live together in Crimonia. Shia takes after her father most; being able to mask her emotions. When she met Yuna, she finds it hard to believe how powerful she is, but after Yuna proves her strength, she warms up to her and becomes more supportive of her in the future.
Cliff Foschurose (クリフ・フォシュローゼ, Kurifu Foshurōze)
Voiced by: Kōji Yusa (Japanese); Y. Chang (English)
Cliff is the feudal lord of Crimonia. He is, according to Yuna, a lord who takes good care of everyone in his domain, including the orphanage. In fact, he is swift with cutting the corruption out of his territory; having been angered at the news a subordinate embezzled funds, and quickly tried to make amends to the victims.
He also knows better than to incur Yuna's wrath; knowing she could destroy Crimonia if she wanted.
Gentz (ゲンツ, Gentsu)
Voiced by: Satoshi Tsuruoka
Gentz is a Guild staff member and a resident of Crimonia. He later becomes Fina and Shuri's stepfather. In his adventuring days, he belonged to Telmina and Roy's party.
Kumakyū (くまきゅう)
Voiced by: Yuuko Kurose (Japanese); Lindsay Seidel (English)
Yuna's summoned Beast along with Kumayuru. It is the white one out of the two bears she summons. The name means "Hugging Bear". They are fast, can sense danger in the area, and are skilled fighters. They later gain the ability to transform into bear cubs.
Kumayuru (くまゆる)
Voiced by: Emi Miyajima (Japanese); Lindsay Seidel (English)
Yuna's summoned Beast along with Kumakyū. It is the black one out of the two bears she summons. The name means "Spinning Bear". They are fast, can sense danger in the area, and are skilled fighters. They later gain the ability to transform into bear cubs.
Telmina (ティルミナ, Tirumina)
Voiced by: Yume Miyamoto^{Ep. 4 credits} (Japanese); Molly Searcy (English)
Telmina is the mother of Fina and Shuri and a resident of Crimonia. She is a former adventurer, but wasn't allowed to resume her old job by her daughters. She is a caring and motherly figure and has lived in poverty for many years. She holds a great love for her family and her benefactor Yuna and feels forever grateful towards her. She later becomes the orphanage's business representative.
Lala (ララ, Rara)
Voiced by: Saki Ichimura^{Ep. 4 credits}
Lala is a maid at the Foschurose residence.
Ellelaura Foschurose (エレローラ・フォシュローゼ, Ererōra Foshurōze)
Voiced by: Yuiko Tatsumi (Japanese); Morgan Garrett (English)
Eleanora Foschurose is a 33-year-old noble residing in the Royal Capital, and the mother of Noire and Shia and the wife of Cliff Foschurose. She currently lives together in the Royal Capital with Shia, working as the King's adviser; while Noire and Cliff live together in Crimonia. Yuna notes Eleanora basically runs the kingdom, as the king relies on her so much. Even though she is in her early thirties, Yuna describes her as someone who only looks like she is in her twenties. Aside from that, Eleanora is famous for her beauty.
Roy (ロイ, Roi)
Roy is Telmina's deceased husband. Gentz, Telmina and he were in the same adventurer party before he and Telmina got married.
Sanya (サーニャ, Sānya)
Voiced by: Lynn
Sanya is the guildmaster of adventurer's guild residing in the royal capital. She is an elf and has a little sister named Ruimin and a little brother named Luca.
Gran Farrengram (グラン・ファーレングラム, Guran Fārenguramu)
Gran is the grandfather of Misana Farrengram. He is the feudal lord of the eastern part of the town of Sheelin. Later, he governs all of Sheelin after the Salbert family, who formerly governed the western part of Sheelin, were stripped of their noble status after becoming involved in a kidnapping incident among other crimes.
Atla (アトラ, Atora)
Voiced by: Kana Asumi (Japanese); Amber Lee Connors (English)
Atla is the guildmaster of the adventurer's guild in Millela. Because Atla dresses in a short skirt and top that exposes her garments underneath, Yuna mistook her for an exhibitionist and the Guild for an adult business.
Atla is quite serious and devoted to her town; though sleep deprivation can make her manic.
Flora (フローラ, Furōra)
Voiced by: Hina Kino (Japanese); Brittany Lauda (English)
Flora is the princess of the kingdom. She is very fond of Yuna, whom created a storybook for Flora that actually was age appropriate.
Bō (ボー)
Bō is the headmistress for the orphanage in Crimonia.
Liz (リズ, Rizu)
Voiced by: Sora Tokui
Liz is the staff and instructor for the children at the orphanage in Crimonia.
Rondo (ロンド, Rondo)
Voiced by: Hiromichi Tezuka
Rondo is the butler at the Foschurose residence.
Kuma Kami
A bear-obsessed deity who sent Yuna to the alternate world based on the game that she plays and provided her with a bear suit. She usually contacts Yuna via virtual messages.
Kai
A young boy who once requested for Yuna's help in defeating a Black Viper threatening his town.
Deborane, Lanz, and Lurina
A group of adventurers who antagonized Yuna during their first meeting, except for Lurina, who is instead supportive towards her.
Enz Roland
The administrator of the orphanage, who has been secretly embezzling its funds. Once Cliff found out about this, he had Enz arrested.
Gulzam
A vengeful mage who swore revenge on the king. In the present, he returned with an army of monsters, but was defeated by Yuna.
Morin
A chef who runs the Bear Haven, a restaurant that is owned by Yuna. She previously ran a bakery.
Karin
Morin's daughter, who works at the Bear Haven. She is made to wear a bear costume, which she at first considers embarrassing.
Damon and Yuura
A couple from Millela that Yuna rescued in the mountains.
Zarrad
Millela's greedy guildmaster who hired thieves to steal for him. His crimes are later exposed by Yuna and Atla, leading to his arrest.
Ans
A talented chef whom Yuna met in Millela. She later moves to Crimonia to open a restaurant with her friends. Like the Bear Haven, their restaurant is owned by Yuna.
Rem
The keeper of Crimonia's Bee Tree.
Helen
A receptionist who works at Crimonia's Adventurers' Guild.
Marix, Timol, and Cattleya
Shia's classmates, who are doubtful of Yuna until seeing her true strength. They become more supportive of her from then on. Compared to the others, Cattleya is the first to warm up to her due to her growing attached to Yuna's bears.
Garan
An employee who works at a fabric factory.
Jiguldo
An adventurer who is also at first doubtful of Yuna when they met.
Jaden and Mel
Two adventurers who grow attached to Yuna.
Sherry
An orphan girl who later moves to a tailor's shop with Yuna's help. She is very good at sewing.
Gold and Nelt
A couple who own a smithy.
Ghazal
A dwarf who made mithril knives for Yuna.
Surilina
A maid who works for the Foschuroses.
Barbould
An adventurer that Yuna has personal issues towards.
Nerin
Morina and Karin's relative. She later starts working in the Bear Haven.
Zelef
A chef who enjoys the food that Yuna provides.
Botts
A chef who works in Sheelia.
Rabon and Gouges
Two guards who accompany Cliff to Sheelia.
Meishun
A maid who works for Misa's family.
Gajurdo
Randle's father, who seeks to rule all of Sheelia; however, he is against doing violent acts and blackmailing unlike his son.
Randle
Gajurdo's spoiled son who is willing to resort to harming or blackmailing innocents to get what he wants unlike his father.
Brad
Randle's cynical bodyguard and former adventurer. He is powerful enough to fight back against Yuna, though she was still stronger than him.

== Media ==
=== Light novels ===
The series was first published online on the Shōsetsuka ni Narō website in October 2014 by Kumanano. It was later acquired by Shufu to Seikatsu Sha, who published the first volume as a light novel under their PASH! Books imprint in May 2015. The series is licensed in North America by Seven Seas Entertainment.

==== Volumes ====
| No. | Original release date | Original ISBN | English release date | English ISBN |
|---|---|---|---|---|
| 1 | May 29, 2015 | 978-4-391-14691-2 | May 7, 2020 (digital); July 7, 2020 (print) | 978-1-64505-443-6 |
| 2 | November 27, 2015 | 978-4-391-14755-1 | June 18, 2020 (digital); September 22, 2020 (print) | 978-1-64505-528-0 |
| 3 | March 25, 2016 | 978-4-391-14810-7 | August 13, 2020 (digital); October 27, 2020 (print) | 978-1-64505-752-9 |
| 4 | July 29, 2016 | 978-4-391-14811-4 | December 17, 2020 (digital); January 26, 2021 (print) | 978-1-64505-794-9 |
| 5 | November 25, 2016 | 978-4-391-14812-1 | February 18, 2021 (digital); March 16, 2021 (print) | 978-1-64505-976-9 |
| 6 | March 31, 2017 | 978-4-391-14947-0 | May 20, 2021 (digital); June 22, 2021 (print) | 978-1-64827-198-4 |
| 7 | July 28, 2017 | 978-4-391-14948-7 | July 22, 2021 (digital); August 31, 2021 (print) | 978-1-64827-239-4 |
| 8 | December 22, 2017 | 978-4-391-14949-4 | December 30, 2021 (digital); January 25, 2022 (print) | 978-1-64827-297-4 |
| 9 | March 30, 2018 | 978-4-391-15144-2 | March 17, 2022 (digital); April 19, 2022 (print) | 978-1-64827-364-3 |
| 10 | July 27, 2018 | 978-4-391-15145-9 | April 28, 2022 (digital); May 17, 2022 (print) | 978-1-63858-154-3 |
| 11 | November 30, 2018 | 978-4-391-15146-6 | May 26, 2022 (digital); July 12, 2022 (print) | 978-1-63858-313-4 |
| 11.5 | January 25, 2019 | 978-4-391-15278-4 | August 25, 2022 (digital); October 11, 2022 (print) | 978-1-63858-594-7 |
| 12 | April 26, 2019 | 978-4-391-15291-3 | October 13, 2022 (digital); December 6, 2022 (print) | 978-1-63858-702-6 |
| 13 | August 30, 2019 | 978-4-391-15292-0 | January 25, 2023 (digital); February 28, 2023 (print) | 978-1-63858-819-1 |
| 14 | January 7, 2020 | 978-4-391-15293-7 | July 20, 2023 (digital); August 8, 2023 (print) | 978-1-63858-960-0 |
| 15 | May 22, 2020 | 978-4-391-15438-2 | August 17, 2023 (digital); September 12, 2023 (print) | 978-1-68579-649-5 |
| 16 | September 25, 2020 | 978-4-391-15437-5 | November 2, 2023 (digital); December 5, 2023 (print) | 979-8-88843-070-5 |
| 17 | April 16, 2021 | 978-4-391-15436-8 | February 8, 2024 (digital); March 12, 2024 (print) | 979-8-88843-433-8 |
| 18 | December 25, 2021 | 978-4-391-15701-7 | April 11, 2024 (digital); June 4, 2024 (print) | 979-8-88843-641-7 |
| 19 | October 7, 2022 | 978-4-391-15785-7 | August 22, 2024 (digital); September 24, 2024 (print) | 979-8-89160-242-7 |
| 20 | August 4, 2023 | 978-4-391-15978-3 | December 12, 2024 (digital); January 7, 2025 (print) | 979-8-89160-243-4 |
| 20.5 | April 30, 2024 | 978-4-391-16208-0 | April 3, 2025 (digital); May 6, 2025 (print) | 979-8-89373-157-6 |
| 21 | February 7, 2025 | 978-4-391-16328-5 | October 9, 2025 (digital); November 4, 2025 (print) | 979-8-89561-686-4 |

=== Manga ===
A manga adaptation with art by Sergei began serialization online via Shufu to Seikatsu Sha's Comic PASH! website on March 28, 2018. It has been collected in fourteen tankōbon volumes as of June 2026. The manga is also licensed in North America by Seven Seas Entertainment.

A spinoff manga series by Yukinori Satō, titled Kuma Kuma Kuma Beā 〜 Kyō mo Kuma Kuma Biyori 〜 (くまクマ熊ベアー 〜今日もくまクマ日和〜), was serialized online via Shufu to Seikatsu Sha's PASH UP! website on September 16, 2020, to August 10, 2022.

A second spinoff manga by Rinen Takizawa, titled Kuma Kuma Kuma Beā Gaiden 〜 Yuna no Yorimichi Techō 〜 (くまクマ熊ベアー外伝 〜ユナのよりみち手帖〜), began serialization online via Shufu to Seikatsu Sha's PASH UP! website on December 28, 2022.

==== Volumes ====
===== Kuma Kuma Kuma Bear =====
| No. | Original release date | Original ISBN | English release date | English ISBN |
|---|---|---|---|---|
| 1 | July 27, 2018 | 978-4-391-15218-0 | May 12, 2020 (digital); June 16, 2020 (print) | 978-1-64505-444-3 |
| 2 | February 22, 2019 | 978-4-391-15289-0 | September 8, 2020 | 978-1-64505-529-7 |
| 3 | August 30, 2019 | 978-4-391-15290-6 | November 10, 2020 | 978-1-64505-778-9 |
| 4 | March 27, 2020 | 978-4-391-15435-1 | January 19, 2021 | 978-1-64505-992-9 |
| 5 | September 25, 2020 | 978-4-391-15434-4 | August 24, 2021 | 978-1-64827-288-2 |
| 6 | May 7, 2021 | 978-4-39-115611-9 | January 11, 2022 | 978-1-64827-478-7 |
| 7 | November 5, 2021 | 978-4-391-15613-3 | October 31, 2023 | 978-1-63858-660-9 |
| 8 | June 17, 2022 | 978-4-391-15776-5 | March 12, 2024 | 978-1-68579-505-4 |
| 9 | November 4, 2022 | 978-4-391-15892-2 | July 23, 2024 | 979-8-88843-669-1 |
| 10 | May 2, 2023 | 978-4-391-15979-0 | December 10, 2024 | 979-8-89160-244-1 |
| 11 | December 1, 2023 | 978-4-391-16131-1 | April 1, 2025 | 979-8-89160-928-0 |
| 12 | August 2, 2024 | 978-4-391-16329-2 | September 2, 2025 | 979-8-89373-654-0 |
| 13 | June 6, 2025 | 978-4-391-16474-9 | April 14, 2026 | 979-8-89561-687-1 |
| 14 | June 5, 2026 | 978-4-391-16716-0 | — | — |

===== Kuma Kuma Kuma Beā 〜 Kyō mo Kuma Kuma Biyori 〜 =====
| No. | Release date | ISBN |
|---|---|---|
| 1 | May 7, 2021 | 978-4-39-115610-2 |
| 2 | September 2, 2022 | 978-4-39-115774-1 |

===== Kuma Kuma Kuma Beā Gaiden 〜 Yuna no Yorimichi Techō 〜 =====
| No. | Release date | ISBN |
|---|---|---|
| 1 | June 2, 2023 | 978-4-39-116028-4 |
| 2 | March 1, 2024 | 978-4-39-116185-4 |
| 3 | December 20, 2024 | 978-4-39-116418-3 |
| 4 | August 1, 2025 | 978-4-391-16582-1 |
| 5 | July 3, 2026 | 978-4-391-16857-0 |

=== Anime ===
In January 2020, an anime television series adaptation was announced in the fourteenth volume of the light novel. The series was animated by EMT Squared and directed by Yuu Nobuta, with Takashi Aoshima handling series composition, Yuki Nakano designing the characters, and Shigeo Komori composing the music. Hisashii Ishii served as series director. The series ran for 12 episodes from October 7 to December 23, 2020, on AT-X and other networks. Azumi Waki performed the opening theme "Itsuka no Kioku" (イツカノキオク). Maki Kawase performed the first ending theme "Ano ne." (あのね。; "You Know What.") from Episodes 2–11, while Kawase and Waki also performed the second ending theme "Ano ne. -loved ones ver.-" (あのね。-loved ones ver.-; "You Know What. -loved ones ver.-") for Episode 12.

Funimation acquired the series and streamed it on its website in North America and the British Isles. On January 19, 2021, Funimation announced the series would receive an English dub, which premiered the following day. Following Sony's acquisition of Crunchyroll, the series was moved to Crunchyroll.

On December 23, 2020, when the first season's finale aired, the production of a second season was announced. The main cast and staff returned from the first season. Titled Kuma Kuma Kuma Bear Punch!, the season aired from April 3 to June 19, 2023. Azumi Waki performed the opening theme "Kimi to no Mirai" (キミトノミライ), while Maki Kawase performed the ending theme "Zutto" (ずっと).

== Reception ==
The series has 3 million copies in circulation by July 2023.

== See also ==
- The Devil Is a Part-Timer! - another light novel series illustrated by the same artist.
