= Monster Musume =

Japanese manga series

- First tankōbon volume cover, featuring Miia (left) and Kimihito Kurusu (right)

モンスター娘のいる日常 (Monsutā Musume no Iru Nichijō)
- Genre: Fantasy comedy; Harem; Romantic comedy
- Manga
- Written by: Okayado
- Published by: Tokuma Shoten
- English publisher: NA: Seven Seas Entertainment
- Magazine: Monthly Comic Ryū
- Original run: 19 March 2012 – present
- Volumes: 21
- Anime television series
- Directed by: Tatsuya Yoshihara
- Written by: Kazuyuki Fudeyasu
- Music by: Hiroaki Tsutsumi; manzo
- Studio: Lerche
- Licensed by: AUS: Hanabee; NA: Sentai Filmworks; UK: MVM Films
- Original network: AT-X, Tokyo MX, Sun TV, KBS, BS11
- Original run: 7 July 2015 – 22 September 2015
- Episodes: 12
- Manga

Monster Musume: I ♥ Monster Girls
- Written by: Various (see text)
- Published by: Tokuma Shoten
- English publisher: NA: Seven Seas Entertainment
- Original run: 12 August 2015 – present
- Volumes: 6
- Original animation DVD
- Directed by: Tatsuya Yoshihara
- Written by: Kazuyuki Fudeyasu
- Studio: Lerche
- Licensed by: AUS: Hanabee; NA: Sentai Filmworks; UK: MVM Films
- Released: 11 November 2016 – 13 April 2017
- Episodes: 2
- icon

Monster Musume (Japanese: モンスター娘のいる日常, Hepburn: Monsutā Musume no Iru Nichijō; "Everyday Life with Monster Girls") is a Japanese manga series written and illustrated by Okayado. (Note: "Okayado" is the pen name of Takemaru Inui.) The series is published in Japan by Tokuma Shoten in their Monthly Comic Ryū magazine and by Seven Seas Entertainment in the United States, with the chapters collected and reprinted into twenty-one tankōbon volumes to date. Monster Musume revolves around Kimihito Kurusu, a Japanese student whose life is thrown into turmoil after accidentally becoming involved with the "Interspecies Cultural Exchange" program.

An anime adaptation aired from July to September 2015, and is licensed by Sentai Filmworks under the title Monster Musume: Everyday Life with Monster Girls.

A light novel based on the series, titled Monster Musume – Monster Girls on the Job!, with Yoshino Origuchi, author of Monster Girl Doctor, as the writer, was published by Seven Seas Entertainment on August 29, 2020.

== Synopsis ==
=== Setting ===
For years, the Japanese government had kept a secret: mythical creatures such as centaurs, mermaids, harpies, and lamias are real. Three years before the start of the story, the government revealed the existence of these creatures and passed the "Interspecies Cultural Exchange Act". Since then, these creatures, known as "liminals", have become a part of human society, living with ordinary families as foreign exchange students and au-pair visitors, but with other duties and restrictions (the primary restrictions being that liminals and humans are forbidden from harming each other or procreating).

=== Plot ===
In Asaka, Saitama, Kimihito Kurusu is a normal student who initially has no connection to the exchange program. However, when coordinator Kuroko Smith delivers the very scared and embarrassed Miia to his door by mistake, he cannot bring himself to send her away and allows her to live at his home, taking advantage of his parents' extended absence. As the story continues, Kimihito meets and gives shelter to other female liminals, each of a different species. Some arrive more or less by accident, while others are forced upon him by Smith or simply force themselves into the house. Before long, Kimihito finds himself in a hectic environment, struggling to live in harmony with his new housemates while dealing with both their constant affectionate/romantic advances and the dramas of helping them get along in the human world. The situation takes on a new twist after he is told that because of expected changes in the law dealing with human-liminal relationships, he is expected to marry one of the girls as a test case, thus increasing their competition for his attention. However, as time passes, other liminal girls become attracted to him and begin to vie for his attention, much to Kimihito's embarrassment and the annoyance of his housemates.

== Media ==
=== Manga ===
Okayado, a pen name of Takemaru Inui, published the prototype for Monster Musume in Comic Ryu's Anthology Comic Kemomo 02, published by Tokuma Shoten, in 2011. He then reworked the story into a serialized publication, and the first chapter was published in Tokuma Shoten's seinen manga magazine Monthly Comic Ryū on 19 March 2012. The first collected tankōbon volume was released on 13 September 2012. The series moved to online-only serialization when Comic Ryū changed formats on 19 June 2018. The series has been licensed in English by Seven Seas Entertainment and in German by Kazé.

A four volume anthology of four-panel spin-offs with stories by Shake-O (Nurse Hitomi's Monster Infirmary), SaQ Tottori (Kyōkai Senjō no Limbo), and Cool-Kyou-Sinnjya (I Can't Understand What My Husband Is Saying, Komori-san Can't Decline), titled Monster Musume: I ♥ Monster Girls (モンスター娘のいる日常 4コマアンソロジー, Monsutā Musume no Iru Nichijō 4 Koma Ansorojī; lit. Everyday Life with Monster Girls 4-Koma Anthology) was published by Tokuma Shoten between 12 August 2015 and February 2016. Seven Seas Entertainment also licensed the spinoff.

==== Volume list ====
The series has been collected into twenty-one volumes, all but the most recent of which have been republished in English.

No.	Original release date	Original ISBN	English release date	English ISBN
1	13 September 2012	978-4-19-950306-1	15 October 2013	978-1-937867-90-4
2	13 February 2013	978-4-19-950324-5	7 January 2014	978-1-626920-03-3
3	13 July 2013	978-4-19-950347-4	6 May 2014	978-1-626920-31-6
4	13 November 2013	978-4-19-950362-7	19 August 2014	978-1-626920-46-0
5	13 March 2014	978-4-19-950386-3	18 November 2014	978-1-626921-06-1
6	13 September 2014	978-4-19-950412-9	3 March 2015	978-1-626921-20-7
7	13 March 2015	978-4-19-950441-9	11 August 2015	978-1-626921-60-3
8	12 August 2015	978-4-19-950465-5	2 February 2016	978-1-626922-13-6
9	13 February 2016	978-4-19-950492-1	30 August 2016	978-1-626922-78-5
10	13 June 2016	978-4-19-950513-3	6 December 2016	978-1-626924-39-0
11	12 November 2016	978-4-19-950535-5	25 April 2017	978-1-626924-66-6
12	13 April 2017	978-4-19-950560-7	29 August 2017	978-1-626925-17-5
13	13 October 2017	978-4-19-950590-4	13 March 2018	978-1-626927-04-9
14	13 June 2018	978-4-19-950630-7	18 December 2018	978-1-626928-31-2
15	13 June 2019	978-4-19-9506-56-7	17 December 2019	978-1-626929-63-0
16	12 June 2020	978-4-19-950708-3	22 December 2020	978-1-645052-37-1
17	11 June 2021	978-4-19-950742-7	10 September 2024	978-1-648279-28-7
18	13 February 2023	978-4-19-950802-8	17 December 2024	978-1-64827-387-2
19	13 March 2024	978-4-19-950848-6	6 May 2025	979-8-89373-161-3
20	13 March 2025	978-4-19-950899-8	16 December 2025	979-8-89561-694-9
21	13 March 2026	978-4-19-950960-5	—	—

Monster Musume: I ♥ Monster Girls

No.	Original release date	Original ISBN	English release date	English ISBN
1	12 August 2015	978-4-19-950467-9	17 May 2016	978-1-626924-01-7
2	12 September 2015	978-4-19-950469-3	12 July 2016	978-1-626923-23-2
3	13 February 2016	978-4-19-950494-5	3 January 2017	978-1-626924-64-2
4	13 February 2016	978-4-19-950495-2	28 March 2017	978-1-626924-65-9
5	13 February 2020	978-4-19-950697-0	10 February 2026	979-8-89561-935-3
6	13 February 2020	978-4-19-950698-7	April 28, 2026	979-8-89561-936-0

=== Anime ===
In September 2014, the Monster Musume website ran a series of polls asking what readers would want to see in an anime adaptation. This was followed in March by the announcement that a television series would begin airing in July 2015. The series, directed by Tatsuya Yoshihara and scripted by Kazuyuki Fudeyasu, was animated by the animation studio Lerche. It stars Junji Majima as the voice of Kurusu Kimihito, Sora Amamiya as Miia, Ari Ozawa as Papi, Natsuki Aikawa as Centorea, Mayuka Nomura as Suu, Haruka Yamazaki as Mero, Sakura Nakamura as Rachnera, Ai Kakuma as Lala, Yū Kobayashi as Ms. Smith, Momo Asakura as Manako, Rei Mochizuki as Zombina, Yurika Kubo as Tionisia, and Saori Ōnishi as Doppel. The opening theme song, titled "Saikōsoku Fall in Love" (最高速 Fall in Love; lit. "Highest Speed Fall in Love"), is performed by the voice actresses for Miia, Papi, Centorea, Suu, Mero, and Rachnera; and the closing song, "Hey! Smith!!" (Hey!スミス!!, Hey! Sumisu!!), is performed by the voice actresses for Ms. Smith, Manako, Tionishia, Zombina, and Doppel.

The series aired in Japan on Tokyo MX, Sun TV, KBS, BS11, and AT-X. It is accompanied by a series of anime shorts, titled Hobo Mainichi OO! Namappoi Dōga (Almost Daily __! Sort of Live Video), which were streamed semi-daily on the Japanese video sharing site Niconico, the service that also streamed the series regular. The shorts were available for a period of 24 hours, with compilation episodes being streamed on the weekends. The series was streamed by Daisuki in Central and Latin America, Indonesia, Singapore, Thailand, and the Philippines. The series is also streamed by Crunchyroll in the United States, Canada, the United Kingdom, Ireland, South Africa, Australia, New Zealand, Latin America, the Netherlands, Scandinavia, and Turkey. The series is licensed by Sentai Filmworks in North America.

An original anime DVD was released with the manga's eleventh volume on 11 November 2016. It was directed by Tatsuya Yoshihara and written by Kazuyuki Fudeyasu, with animation by Lerche. The OAD adapts chapter 17 of the manga, which was included in the fourth tankōbon volume. A second original anime DVD was released with the manga's twelfth volume on 13 April 2017. An English version was released on 25 July 2017.

No.	Title	Original release date
1	"Everyday Life with a Lamia" "Ramia no Iru Nichijō" (ラミアのいる日常)	7 July 2015
Kimihito Kurusu wakes up to find a Lamia named Miia crushing him in her sleep. After escaping, he draws a bath for her to warm up and goes to make breakfast. In the kitchen, he is surprised by Smith, who has come to make sure he is not engaging in any prohibited activities with Miia, such as sex. After Smith leaves, Miia tries to seduce him, only to accidentally dislocate his shoulder. The two go on a field trip, including a visit to an all-species lingerie shop. Afterwards, they run into a racist couple who harass Miia, and Kimihito has to jump in the way when she tries to strike them with her tail, to keep her from breaking the law. Trying to escape from a curious crowd, they hide in a love hotel, where the Interspecies Exchange Security Squad ambushes them. However, Smith recognizes the issue and fixes it. Leaving the hotel, they again encounter the racist couple, and when they begin harassing Miia again, Kimihito punches them. At home, Miia resumes her advances on Kimihito, only for them to be interrupted by Smith.
2	"Everyday Life with a Harpy and Centaur" "Hāpī to Kentaurosu no Iru Nichijō" (ハーピーとケンタウロスのいる日常)	14 July 2015
Kimihito is kidnapped by Papi, who brings him to a park, where he buys her ice cream. Papi then takes a bath in a public fountain, where Miia finds them. Despite various mishaps, the three work together to save a girl stuck in a tree. When a policeman arrives, Kimihito claims to be Papi's host family to keep her from being deported. The officer is skeptical, but Smith arrives with Papi's papers just in time and tells Kimihito that she was on her way to make the harpy live with him, and Papi joins the household. While out grocery shopping, Kimihito collides with Centorea, who becomes convinced that Kimihito is her destined master. Encountering a motorcycle-riding purse-snatcher, the two pursue him. They eventually catch him, despite various embarrassing accidents. When the thief tries to attack Centorea with her dropped sword, Kimihito leaps in front of her and takes the blow, but survives because the sword is a replica. Later, Smith explains that Kimihito riding Centorea could be viewed as akin to rape, since only a centaur's chosen master may ride them. Centorea chooses him as her master, and she joins his household.
3	"Everyday Life Under Dangerous Circumstances" "Abunai Jijō na Nichijō" (アブない事情な日常)	21 July 2015
When Papi tries to seduce Kimihito during their bath, Centorea rescues him, and they flee to the park, where they share a tender moment. They are then interrupted by Miia and Papi, who begin fighting over Kimihito's affection. Smith arrives with a tranquilizer gun to stop them, but accidentally shoots Kimihito instead. When he wakes up at home, the three are apologetic for the harm they have caused him, but he dismisses their worries. Smith then announces that proposed changes to the Interspecies Exchange Bill have been made, and she wants him to marry one of the girls as a test case. That night, Miia arrives in Kimihito's room and tries to seduce him, only to be interrupted by Papi, who crashes through the window. Centorea arrives to rescue Kimihito from Papi and explains that the full moon is to blame for their abnormal behavior, as it heightens liminal emotions; however, it soon becomes clear that she is affected as well. Kimihito realizes that they are not in control of themselves, and he is in serious danger of being injured or killed through their amorous advances. Waking up the next morning, none of the three girls remembers the events of the previous night. An injured Kimihito announces his plans to begin dating all three of them before collapsing unconscious on the floor.
4	"Everyday Life with a Slime" "Suraimu no Iru Nichijō" (スライムのいる日常)	28 July 2015
While waiting for dinner, Miia opens a pot on the stove and is attacked by a slime. Centorea explains that slimes are among many species yet unrecognized by human society; the slime attacks again, and when Centorea's sword has no effect, both she and Kimihito end up covered in slime. When he goes to take a bath, Centorea joins him after being unable to get clean. As she conjectures that the slime was attacking them to get water, it attacks them again in the bath. When Centorea slips and is knocked unconscious, the slime takes the form of a woman and begins imitating Kimihito's washing of Cerea by washing him; however, because her body is liquid, she absorbs and almost drowns him before he escapes by diluting her in the tub. They debate what to do with her, and Papi (who seems to have immediately taken to the newcomer) reveals that she has named her Suu. The girls point out that she is likely an illegal immigrant; Papi overhears this and, thinking they mean to turn Suu in, flees with her. When Kimihito catches up with them, they meet a group of children who often play with Papi. When one of the children is almost hit by a truck driven by the racist couple from the first episode, Suu saves her but falls off a bridge. Luckily, Kimihito gets under her with the crashed truck before she falls into the water. After that, he decides to let her stay at his house. They go home, only to find Smith there.
5	"Everyday Life with a Mermaid" "Ningyo no Iru Nichijō" (人魚のいる日常)	4 August 2015
A construction crew from the Interspecies Exchange Security Squad arrives while the girls are making a plan to hide Suu from Smith. The girls sneak out with Suu, only to realize that they have left Kimihito behind. They are forced to hide when security forces appear, seemingly pursuing them. Each of the three girls somehow get wet, causing them all to be assaulted by a dehydrated Suu. Meanwhile, Kimihito is searching for them when he is hit by a girl in a runaway wheelchair, who introduces herself as Mero. When they arrive at the park, Mero is almost assaulted by Suu, but Kimihito catches her in a plastic bag. Arriving home, they thank Smith for building a room for Suu; however, she reveals that the room is not for Suu but for Mero, who is revealed to be a mermaid. After accidentally breaking Mero's wheelchair, which forces Kimihito to carry the mermaid around the house, Miia becomes intensely jealous and unsuccessfully attempts to enlist Centorea and Papi's help in foiling the mermaid. When Kimihito knocks Mero into the pool to save her from a once-again dehydrated Suu, Miia thinks Mero is making a romantic advance and dives in after them, almost drowning when the cold water makes her sluggish. Later, as Miia and Mero take a bath together, the mermaid reveals that she has no intention of wooing Kimihito away from Miia; all mermaids want to experience a tragic love like "The Little Mermaid". Centorea and Papi overhear this and believe that the two are plotting.
6	"Everyday Life with Shedding and Egg Laying" "Dappi to Sanran Suru Nichijō" (脱皮と産卵する日常)	11 August 2015
While trying to learn to cook, Miia accidentally burns her hands on a hot pot. Attempting to console her, Kimihito learns that she is shedding and can not do so properly with her hands bandaged. He agrees to help her shed; however, while attempting to shed her Lamia belly, he accidentally touches a sensitive spot, and she reflexively knocks him unconscious. To apologize, she makes him dinner, which turns out inedible because she didn't use a cookbook. Later, when Kimihito comes home from shopping, Papi announces that she is going to lay an egg, causing the other girls to leap to conclusions before being told that it is unfertilized. A director named Kasegi then arrives at the house, claiming to be shooting a documentary on interspecies exchange. While touring the house, he causes various incidents such as filming Mero when her swimsuit slips, groping Centorea when she says she does not wear a bra, and taking Miia's shed skin. Mero then arrives to announce that Papi is about to lay her egg. While Kasegi is filming Kimihito helping Papi, Suu reads his mind, revealing his true intent of profiteering from the egg and the footage. Kimihito distracts him with a store egg that he pretends is Papi's and uses the opportunity to punch him unconscious. Papi then lays her egg, which Miia accidentally cooks later after Papi stores it in the refrigerator. At the end of the episode, Kasegi is seen berating an Arachne for building webs everywhere. She then wraps him in thread and says she is interested in his story about Kimihito.
7	"Everyday Life with MON and an Arachne" "MON to Arakune no Iru Nichijō" (MONとアラクネのいる日常)	18 August 2015
The Orc Pioneer Foundation performs an armed takeover of a dōjinshi store. After taking human hostages, they demand an increase in the amount of orc-related content appearing in erotic manga titles. Because of provisional gaps in the Interspecies Exchange Bill, the police are unable to act. Smith claims that she can resolve the situation. Using their sense of smell, the orcs detect a female agent attempting to infiltrate the building and shoot her. The chief of police admits that he needs Smith's help. Meanwhile, the orcs find another girl hiding inside the store. While they struggle with her, the blinds are ripped from the store windows, allowing long-range sniper Manako to shoot the orcs' guns from a distant rooftop. Tionishia then breaks in to release the hostages. The agent who was shot earlier then reveals herself to be a zombie, Zombina. At the same time, the other hostage turns out to be Doppel, a shape-shifter. They subdue and arrest the orcs. Later, MON responds to an emergency call from the wrapped-up Kasegi, but the Arachne escapes. Smith and the girls soon realize that the same Arachne has kidnapped Kimihito. In a deserted warehouse, Kimihito wakes up bound and hanging upside-down. The Arachne introduces herself as Rachnera Arachnera and begins tormenting him. She is surprised when he shows no signs of being repulsed by her spider-like lower half. When Smith, the MON Squad, and the police arrive to arrest her, Kimihito mistakenly thinks they are there to arrest him for assaulting Kasegi, and Rachnera realizes that she likes him. With the situation resolved, Smith, with some subtle prodding from Rachnera, decides to transfer Rachnera into Kimihito's household.
8	"Everyday Life in Poor Health" "Taichō Furyō na Nichijō" (体調不良な日常)	25 August 2015
Rachnera settles in as a member of the Kurusu household; however, Miia and Cerea, who do not trust her, are not as enthusiastic as Papi, Suu, and Mero. Cerea begins to stick very close to Kimihito, ostensibly protecting him from potentially embarrassing situations created by Rachnera. When Rachnera tries to seduce Kimihito in his bedroom, Cerea rescues him and flees with him into the city streets. The male from the racist couple and his gang begin harassing Kimihito and Cerea, but Rachnera makes a timely appearance and rescues the two when they attempt to rape the latter. She then comes to an understanding with Cerea, and Cerea realizes that Rachnera can be trusted. Later, Kimihito comes down with a bad cold, and Ms. Smith immediately puts him in quarantine in his bedroom, ordering the other girls to keep away from him, fearing a possible pandemic. She states that she will care for Kimihito (an obvious ploy to ditch her mountain of paperwork), but almost immediately conks out, forcing the girls decide to take matters into their own hands. Realizing that Suu is the only one who can come into contact with Kimihito without becoming sick, since she's a slime, Miia, Papi, Cerea, and Mero coach her on different ways to take care of him. With her telepathic ability, Suu learns that Kimihito caught a cold during a rainstorm while out looking for her. Suu then proceeds to breastfeed Kimihito, which ultimately proves successful in curing Kimihito, but Ms. Smith winds up catching his cold. Smith calls up the MON for help; unwilling to help her after leaving them to do her paperwork from earlier, they use the same pandemic excuse she made.
9	"Everyday Life with Threatening Letters" "Kyōhakujō ga Kita Nichijō" (脅迫状が来た日常)	1 September 2015
Discovering that Kimihito is going on a date with Ms. Smith, Miia, Papi, Cerea, Mero and Suu immediately begin tailing them, first to a maid cafe (where Mero disguises herself as one of the maids, using Suu as a uniform), then to an arcade (where Papi is disguised as a cosplayer with Suu's help), then to an ice cream truck (where Miia and Cerea impersonate servers, also with Suu's help), but they fail each time. Finally, Miia follows Kimihito and Ms. Smith to a love hotel, where she meets Rachnera. They try sneaking into Ms. Smith and Kimihito's room, but are hindered by Miia, causing them to be grabbed by the MON Squad. Ms. Smith explains that Kimihito had received a threatening letter from someone named "D", and their "date" was actually a ploy to lure the culprit out. Since they failed to do so, Ms. Smith asks all the girls to go on dates with Kimihito. Kimihito's first date is with Miia (with Mero in tow and Tionishia as a bodyguard); they go to an aquarium where Mero is treated like royalty. Upset that Kimihito seems to be paying more attention to Mero, Miia storms off, only to bump into a reptilian liminal, a Dragonewt named Draco, who takes her out on a boat where he attempts to sexually assault her. Kimihito, with some help from Mero, rescues Miia and inadvertently exposes Draco as actually being a female. While Draco did not write the letter, Ms. Smith arrests her anyway for being out without her host family.
10	"Everyday Life with D" "Dī no Iru Nichijō" (Dのいる日常)	8 September 2015
Kimihito's second "date" involves an outdoor barbecue in a wooded area where industrial nutrient waste was once dumped with Papi and Suu (along with Zombina for the food). However, the barbecue is interrupted by a giant tree kaiju that seems to know Papi, who grabs both her and Kimihito. Papi recognizes her as Kii, a dryad she had once rescued, but completely forgotten about. Kii, who the illegally dumped waste had poisoned, is on a rampage with a grudge against all humans for the pollution. Suu, who fell into industrial waste earlier, grows to a giant size and battles Kii to save Kimihito and Papi; she tells them that the only way to stop Kii may be to extract the waste from her body, which Papi and Kimihito do by sucking on her breasts. With Kii calmed and restored to her normal size, and cleared of being the mysterious "D" because she cannot write, she is offered a new host family, but decides to remain in the forest, on the condition that Papi and Suu can visit her. The third "date" is with Cerea, clad in full armor to protect Kimihito. Manako, the MON member shadowing this "date," is completely blindsided by Lilith, a devil, who looks like a child but is actually an adult who enjoys pulling pranks on people. Lilith turns her hypnotic tricks on Cerea, who, because of earlier incidents, is feeling inadequate as Kimihito's "servant". The prank is interrupted by a large and angry wild boar that attacks her. Kimihito manages to distract it while Cerea subdues it, and Kimihito reassures Cerea that he has trusted her from the beginning. Cerea's confidence is restored, and she is put in charge of salad-making. Lilith, meanwhile, who tried her tricks on Rachnera (who had been following Kimihito and Cerea), is caught and severely "punished" by the Arachne, who learns that Lilith is not "D" either.
11	"Everyday Life with Dullahan" "Durahan no Iru Nichijō" (デュラハンのいる日常)	15 September 2015
Frustrated by their repeated failure to uncover the mysterious "D", who has sent a second, more threatening letter, the MON members (minus Doppel) decide to take matters into their own hands and have Kimihito date each of them in one day. First, Tionishia nearly kills Kimihito by literally dragging him to different shops, including a dress shop where even the largest size proves too small for her. Kimihito reveals that he can expertly alter normal clothing to fit liminals, since he's done so many times with Miia's clothing. Next, Zombina drags Kimihito off to a zombie film; later, when her hand comes off, he uses his sewing skills to reattach it, and she is impressed but teases him by deliberately detaching a breast and getting him to sew it back on as well. The last "date" is with a very self-conscious Manako, who becomes flustered by his being able to look her straight in the eye. The "date" is interrupted when Manako spots a shadowy figure following them, and all three MON girls team up to apprehend the stalker, who turns out to be Doppel, who sent the first letter as a joke. Kimihito soon learns that someone else sent the second letter when a mysterious girl with blue skin, dressed in black, presses a scythe against his throat. Later that evening, the girls are shocked when Kimihito brings home a headless girl, disturbing Miia. Kimihito, Cerea, Papi, Mero, and a reluctant Miia search the nearby park where the head rolled into. They locate the head, which starts talking to Kimihito, admitting that she sent the second letter and also asks him to restore her to her body. The conversation is interrupted by the policeman, who freaks out upon seeing Kimihito holding the head. Thanks to some unexpected and unintentional help from Papi, the gang gets away and returns home with the head. Once the body and head are restored to each other, the girl reveals herself as a dullahan and that she has come to claim Kimihito, who is allegedly on the verge of death.
12	"Everyday Life with Monster Girls" "Monsutā Musume-tachi no Iru Nichijō" (モンスター娘たちのいる日常)	22 September 2015
To prevent the dullahan from collecting Kimihito's soul, the girls decide to take him away from her as far as possible, but their attempts only cause him more injuries. Rachnera appears with the dullahan, claiming that if she is really a reaper of souls, then there is nothing they can do to prevent Kimihito's death. When Miia decides to die along with Kimihito, claiming that she cannot bear losing him, Kimihito decides to stop running away and face his imminent death. To everybody's surprise, however, nothing happens. Back at home, Kimihito and the girls discover from Ms. Smith that the dullahan's name is Lala. She is not a real reaper of souls at all; she ran away from several host families where she had previously lived because no one there was dying. Ms. Smith allows Lala to live with Kimihito and the others at her request. When questioned about how he saw through Lala's lies, Kimihito answers that he realized she had a late case of eighth-grader syndrome because he had the same when he was younger. Sometime later, Kimihito realizes that, due to the massive food bill caused by his liminal guests, he is in major financial trouble, and, after Miia's latest cooking attempt ends in disaster, there is no more food in the house. He then sets out grocery shopping with Cerea, Papi, Mero, and Suu, and the monster girls' sympathy with the local vendors earns them plenty of merchandise at special discounts. To obtain some extra vegetables, Kimihito and Suu visit Kii, who guides them to an area with edible plants, and Kimihito learns that Suu can tell the difference between edible and poisonous plants just by tasting them. On the way back home, Draco attacks Kimihito, but Suu defends him with the poison she absorbed from the plant tasting. Once home, Kimihito prepares dinner for the girls, but Ms. Smith and the girls from MON suddenly appear to dine with them as well, completely wiping out the house's food supply once again. Kimihito is in despair, but Smith explains that the Interspecies Program will reimburse him for all the girls' food expenses. Kimihito asks Smith why she had not told him this sooner, and she replies that she forgot.
OVA	"Everyday Life at the Pool" "Jimu de Pūru na Nichijō" (ジムでプールな日常)	11 November 2016
While undergoing physical examinations, which include bust-waist-hip measurements, most of the girls find out they have been gaining weight, but they can not go out to exercise without Kimihito. Smith sends Kimihito and the girls to a gym suited for liminals, owned and run by a very enthusiastic kobold named Polt. She takes everyone on a tour of the brand-new facility but learns that not everyone is suited to or able to use the exercise equipment. A visit to the gym's oversized pool leads to a race between Miia and Mero, with Kimihito as the Grand Prize.
OVA–2	"Everyday Life when Rachnera Disappears" "Rakunera ga Inaku Naru Nichijō" (ラクネラがいなくなる日常)	13 April 2017
One morning, Ren Kunanzuki, the daughter of Rachnera's previous host family, shows up with a petition for Rachnera to return to them. Unfortunately, Ren is quite obsessed with her stubborn attitude that taking in Rachnera constitutes a trial for her patience and capability, and her encounters with Kimihito's other housemates only serve to strengthen her opinion until Kimihito finally returns home. In a post-credit skit, Miia persuades her fellow housemates and the girls of MON to try on new bras and pantyhose she has purchased for them all.

=== Video games ===
Coinciding with the release of the first anime episode, it was announced that an online PC game adapted from the series would be released by DMM Games in 2015. The game was released on 21 December 2015. At the height of its popularity, it had around 200,000 players. The game was shut down on 22 November 2016. In May 2024 an HTML5 browser game titled "Monster Musume Fantastic Life" was launched on the platform G123.

== Reception ==
As of 1 September 2014, over a million copies of the tankōbon volumes had been sold. The series reached 2.3 million copies in print on 13 February 2016.

The first ten volumes of the English translation have appeared on the New York Times Manga Best Sellers list, prior to the list's discontinuation:

- Volume 1 stayed on the list for six weeks; for the first two weeks it ranked at number 1.
- Volume 2 stayed on the list for seven weeks (ranking among the top 10 for five nonconsecutive); the first two weeks as number 2.
- Volume 3 stayed for five weeks, ranking at number 1 for the first three weeks.
- Volume 4 stayed for five nonconsecutive weeks, debuting at number 1.
- Volume 5 stayed for three weeks, ranking at number 1 for the first two.
- Volume 6 stayed for four weeks, beginning at number 2 on the first week, and peaking at number 1 on the second week.
- Volume 7 stayed for seven weeks, debuting at number 1.
- Volume 8 stayed for five nonconsecutive weeks, debuting at number 1.
- Volume 9 stayed for four weeks, debuting at number 1.
- Volume 10 stayed for two weeks, ranking at number 3 for the first.

Two volumes of the English translation of Monster Musume: I Heart Monster Girls have appeared on the New York Times Manga Best Sellers list:

- Volume 1 stayed for three weeks, debuting at number 1.
- Volume 2 stayed for two weeks, ranking at number 8 for the first.

== See also ==
- Rosario + Vampire, a monster manga series predating Monster Musume's debut
- 12 Beast, another manga series by the same author
- Monster Girl Doctor, a light novel series by Yoshino Origuchi and Z-Ton
- Lycoris Recoil, an anime series with background art provided by Hotaka Okamoto
