= List of Miss Kobayashi's Dragon Maid chapters =

Miss Kobayashi's Dragon Maid is a Japanese manga series written and illustrated by Coolkyousinnjya. It began publishing in the first issue of Futabasha's Monthly Action magazine on 25 May 2013. Seven Seas Entertainment licensed the series in North America, and they released the first volume in October 2016.

== Volume list ==
=== Miss Kobayashi's Dragon Maid ===
| No. | Original release date | Original ISBN | English release date | English ISBN |
|---|---|---|---|---|
| 1 | 10 May 2014 | 978-4-575-84405-4 | 18 October 2016 | 978-1-626923-48-5 |
| 2 | 10 February 2015 | 978-4-575-84570-9 | 21 February 2017 | 978-1-626924-31-4 |
| 3 | 10 September 2015 | 978-4-575-84679-9 | 9 May 2017 | 978-1-626924-85-7 |
| 4 | 12 May 2016 | 978-4-575-84796-3 | 26 September 2017 | 978-1-626925-46-5 |
| 5 | 12 December 2016 | 978-4-575-84894-6 | 14 November 2017 | 978-1-626926-74-5 |
| 6 | 12 July 2017 | 978-4-575-85002-4 | 22 May 2018 | 978-1-626927-84-1 |
| 7 | 12 April 2018 | 978-4-575-85134-2 | 6 November 2018 | 978-1-626928-98-5 |
| 8 | 12 February 2019 | 978-4-575-85267-7 | 30 July 2019 | 978-1-626929-94-4 |
| 9 | 12 November 2019 | 978-4-575-85374-2 | 2 June 2020 | 978-1-642751-18-5 |
| 10 | 11 August 2020 | 978-4-575-85476-3 | 30 March 2021 | 978-1-645057-84-0 |
| 11 | 10 June 2021 | 978-4-575-85589-0 | 14 December 2021 | 978-1-648274-63-3 |
| 12 | 12 January 2022 | 978-4-575-85679-8 | 2 August 2022 | 978-1-638586-07-4 |
| 13 | 10 November 2022 | 978-4-575-85777-1 | 19 December 2023 | 978-1-685794-71-2 |
| 14 | 12 September 2023 | 978-4-575-85887-7 | 26 March 2024 | 979-8-888433-70-6 |
| 15 | 11 April 2024 | 978-4-575-85958-4 | 17 December 2024 | 979-8-89160-643-2 |
| 16 | 13 February 2025 | 978-4-575-86053-5 | 25 November 2025 | 979-8-89561-689-5 |
| 17 | 12 June 2025 | 978-4-575-86100-6 | 25 August 2026 | 979-8-89765-547-2 |
| 18 | 13 November 2025 | 978-4-575-86152-5 | 15 December 2026 | 979-8-89863-203-8 |
| 19 | 9 April 2026 | 978-4-575-86206-5 | — | — |
| 20 | 10 September 2026 | 978-4-575-86264-5 | — | — |

=== Miss Kobayashi's Dragon Maid: Kanna's Daily Life ===
| No. | Original release date | Original ISBN | English release date | English ISBN |
|---|---|---|---|---|
| 1 | 28 March 2017 | 978-4-575-84948-6 | 2 January 2018 | 978-1-626927-51-3 |
| 2 | 12 July 2017 | 978-4-575-85003-1 | 5 June 2018 | 978-1-626927-93-3 |
| 3 | 12 October 2017 | 978-4-575-85044-4 | 16 October 2018 | 978-1-626928-99-2 |
| 4 | 10 February 2018 | 978-4-575-85105-2 | 5 February 2019 | 978-1-626929-96-8 |
| 5 | 10 June 2018 | 978-4-575-85105-2 | 11 June 2019 | 978-1-642751-06-2 |
| 6 | 12 February 2019 | 978-4-575-85268-4 | 17 December 2019 | 978-1-642757-49-1 |
| 7 | 12 December 2019 | 978-4-575-85389-6 | 21 July 2020 | 978-1-645054-97-9 |
| 8 | 11 August 2020 | 978-4-575-85477-0 | 27 April 2021 | 978-1-645057-85-7 |
| 9 | 12 July 2021 | 978-4-575-85600-2 | 18 January 2022 | 978-1-64827-345-2 |
| 10 | 12 February 2022 | 978-4-575-85692-7 | 8 November 2022 | 978-1-63858-661-6 |
| 11 | 12 December 2022 | 978-4-575-85788-7 | 19 December 2023 | 978-1-68579-493-4 |
| 12 | 12 October 2023 | 978-4-575-85900-3 | 24 September 2024 | 979-8-89160-498-8 |
| 13 | 10 May 2024 | 978-4-575-85968-3 | 12 August 2025 | 979-8-89373-683-0 |
| 14 | 13 February 2025 | 978-4-575-86054-2 | 31 March 2026 | 979-8-89561-866-0 |
| 15 | 11 December 2025 | 978-4-575-86165-5 | — | — |
| 16 | 6 August 2026 | 978-4-575-86256-0 | — | — |

=== Miss Kobayashi's Dragon Maid: Elma's Office Lady Diary ===
| No. | Original release date | Original ISBN | English release date | English ISBN |
|---|---|---|---|---|
| 1 | 11 May 2018 | 978-4-575-85151-9 | 26 February 2019 | 978-1-642750-34-8 |
| 2 | 12 February 2019 | 978-4-575-85269-1 | 20 August 2019 | 978-1-642751-43-7 |
| 3 | 12 December 2019 | 978-4-575-85390-2 | 4 August 2020 | 978-1-64505-218-0 |
| 4 | 11 August 2020 | 978-4-575-85478-7 | 25 May 2021 | 978-1-64505-810-6 |
| 5 | 11 August 2021 | 978-4-575-85619-4 | 3 May 2022 | 978-1-64827-232-5 |
| 6 | 12 February 2022 | 978-4-575-85691-0 | 6 December 2022 | 978-1-64827-388-9 |
| 7 | 12 January 2023 | 978-4-575-85802-0 | 12 December 2023 | 978-1-68579-517-7 |
| 8 | 12 October 2023 | 978-4-575-85899-0 | 11 June 2024 | 979-8-88843-780-3 |
| 9 | 10 May 2024 | 978-4-575-85967-6 | 15 April 2025 | 979-8-89160-644-9 |
| 10 | 10 April 2025 | 978-4-575-86075-7 | 31 March 2026 | 979-8-89561-690-1 |
| 11 | 13 November 2025 | 978-4-575-86154-9 | — | — |
| 12 | 10 September 2026 | 978-4-575-86266-9 | — | — |

=== Miss Kobayashi's Dragon Maid: Lucoa is my xx ===
| No. | Japanese release date | Japanese ISBN |
|---|---|---|
| 1 | 12 November 2019 | 978-4-575-85373-5 |
| 2 | 11 August 2020 | 978-4-575-85479-4 |
| 3 | 11 August 2021 | 978-4-575-85618-7 |
| 4 | 12 January 2022 | 978-4-575-85680-4 |
| 5 | 9 February 2023 | 978-4-575-85813-6 |
| 6 | 12 September 2023 | 978-4-575-85888-4 |
| 7 | 11 April 2024 | 978-4-575-85957-7 |
| 8 | 15 May 2025 | 978-4-575-86089-4 |
| 9 | 11 December 2025 | 978-4-575-86164-8 |
| 10 | 6 August 2026 | 978-4-575-86255-3 |

=== Miss Kobayashi's Dragon Maid: Fafnir the Recluse ===
| No. | Original release date | Original ISBN | English release date | English ISBN |
|---|---|---|---|---|
| 1 | 12 July 2021 | 978-4-575-85599-9 | 17 January 2023 | 978-1-63858-951-8 |
| 2 | 10 March 2022 | 978-4-575-85699-6 | 2 May 2023 | 978-1-68579-518-4 |
| 3 | 9 March 2023 | 978-4-575-85819-8 | 7 November 2023 | 979-8-88843-042-2 |
| 4 | 11 April 2024 | 978-4-575-85956-0 | 31 December 2024 | 979-8-88843-767-4 |
| 5 | 13 March 2025 | 978-4-575-86067-2 | 13 January 2026 | 979-8-89561-691-8 |
| 6 | 13 November 2025 | 978-4-575-86153-2 | — | — |
| 7 | 10 September 2026 | 978-4-575-86265-2 | — | — |

=== Miss Kobayashi's Dragon Maid: Ilulu Doesn't Understand Love ===
| No. | Original release date | Original ISBN | English release date | English ISBN |
|---|---|---|---|---|
| 1 | 10 July 2025 | 978-4-575-86111-2 | 3 November 2026 | 979-8-89863-475-9 |
| 2 | 6 August 2026 | 978-4-575-86254-6 | — | — |
