= List of Monster Musume characters =

Character descriptions

This is a list of fictional characters appearing in the Japanese manga series Monster Musume, which is serialized in the magazine Monthly Comic Ryū, published by Tokuma Shoten.

== Main characters ==
=== Kimihito Kurusu ===
Voiced by: Junji Majima (Japanese); Bryson Baugus (English)

Kimihito Kurusu (来留主 公人, Kurusu Kimihito) is a typical Japanese student living in Asaka, Saitama at his parents' home while they are temporarily working abroad, with a part-time job and all the dreams and feelings of young people. However, through no fault of his own, he is literally thrown into the world of the Interspecies Cultural Exchange Accord, becoming a "host family" to a group of liminals, or "monster girls". He can only watch helplessly as Ms. Smith has his house remodeled repeatedly to accommodate each newcomer. Kimihito seems to excel at certain household chores and activities, such as cooking and sewing. Another talent (instinctively but unwillingly acquired and later eagerly demanded) is his skill at and technique of milking Minotaurs and Pans by hand.^{[ch. 56]}^{[ch. 58]}

Almost none of the other characters call Kimihito by his actual name, except for Ms. Smith in the first chapter and Manako as of Chapter 42, the girls seem to fall in love with him simply because he is nice, friendly, and modest, and because he treats the "monster" girls as ordinary, real people — not as exotic or dangerous creatures. He is so unconsciously adept at this that he seems to become friends with other liminals with astonishing ease. He is also not afraid to unhesitatingly put himself in physical danger to protect or save his liminal houseguests, whom he thinks of as family, as demonstrated on several occasions such as bodily shielding Centorea from a sword attack^{[ch. 4]}, trying to save an injured Mero,^{[ch. 38]} or nearly being absorbed by a giant-sized slime liminal while attempting to save Suu.^{[ch. 55]}

Considering everything happening to him and going on around him, he has a very patient but long-suffering nature, and he accepts being put upon by Ms. Smith (and later the girls of the MON squad) with good grace. Still, he cares deeply about his houseguests' well-being. He rarely shows any anger towards anyone, especially the girls, but when he does he demonstrates a surprisingly strong assertiveness, two of the most notorious examples occurring first because a racist couple insulted Miia^{[ch. 2]} and second because Lala was playing with her food instead of eating it — which prompted all the others to ensure that they clean their plates from then on.^{[vol. 6: before "Secrets of Lala"]}

In Yoshino Origuchi's light novel "Monster Girls on the Job" (2020, Seven Seas Entertainment, ISBN 978-1-64827-559-3), he accompanies all of his homestay girls and the MON members on their various jobs as part of the new Interspecies Cultural Exchange Work Program.

=== Miia ===
Voiced by: Sora Amamiya (Japanese); Allison Sumrall (English)

Miia (ミーア, Mīa) is a lamia (part woman, part snake),^{[ch. 1]} the first liminal to live with Kimihito. She is about 8 meters (26 ft) long, but she always keeps her front upright, so she appears of normal human height. She has red hair, golden eyes with vertical slit pupils, and pale human skin, and her snake part has copper scales with a pinkish-cream underbelly. Her standard accessory is a pair of D-shaped hair clips, a common fashion statement among her people. Unlike snakes, which lack external ears, Miia has large, triangular, scaly ears. She is a poikilotherm, which makes her drowsy in the mornings or in cold weather, and can be dangerous if she enters cold water.

She has a pleasant personality and harbors an extreme crush (both figuratively and literally) on Kimihito, whom she always refers to as Darling (だぁりん, Dārin), on the brink of the obsessive. Since all lamia are female, they need a human male for procreation and are very passionate about their partners. In Chapter 27, it is revealed that Miia's original reason for studying abroad was to find a "tribal husband" for her home village: the lamiai custom was that a human male would be "coerced" (taken against his will) and brought back to be shared among all the lamiais, but when the Interspecies Exchange Accord was enacted and laws were passed protecting humans from liminals, that method had to be abandoned. However, after getting to know Kimihito, Miia fell madly in love with him.^{[ch. 27]} It's also revealed by Miia's mother that Miia's father once escaped from the lamiai tribe.^{[vol. 7: "Meeting of the Mothers"]}

Because she sees herself as Kimihito's primary marriage candidate, she often finds herself in conflict with the other girls. She is not a good housekeeper and an abysmal cook, as proven when she accidentally gives the other household members food poisoning on several occasions because her sense of taste is far weaker than a human's, and she frequently uses "alternative" ingredients.

In Chapter 43, thanks to a recommendation from the priest for whom Ils Nineta works, she gets a part-time job as a shrine maiden at a shrine near Kimihito's home, where she is an instant success, thanks to snakes being considered extremely lucky in Japan.^{[ch. 43]}

In Yoshino Origuchi's light novel "Monster Girls on the Job" (2020, Seven Seas Entertainment, ISBN 978-1-64827-559-3), she works as a waitress at Bar Zerro N as part of the new Interspecies Cultural Exchange Work Program.

=== Papi ===
Voiced by: Ari Ozawa (Japanese); Brittney Karbowski (English)

Papi (パピ, Papi) is a harpy and the second housemate. She is petite and physically appears much younger than the other girls, even though she is the same age as them, since harpies have evolved smaller, slimmer bodies to enable flight and generally have a much less mature manner than other races.

She has a human body, but halfway down her upper arms, they turn into feather-covered wings. Her wings and hair are light blue, and her eyes are brown. Like a bat, she has a free thumb with a claw, so she can, to some extent, use the wing as a hand, but she always has trouble maintaining a secure grip. However, she has gained considerable skill with the controller for Kimihito's Nintendo Wii;^{[ch. 8]} sometimes she gives up and uses the controller with her feet. Her legs start to get covered with light brown scales by mid-thigh, and her elongated feet have only three toes that end in rather impressive talons, like a bird's.

She is good-natured, happy, and playful, but unfortunately, she is quite unintelligent and has a very short attention span. She sometimes forgets what she was doing after taking only three steps, and her long-term memory is even worse. However, in Chapter 28, after being carried by Kimihito for a distance, she was able to remember a great deal about her past,^{[ch. 28]} so she has trouble learning and remembering any kind of rules.^{[ch. 3]} This gives her quite a childlike personality, and she actually enjoys playing with the local children. Despite her petite frame, she can get considerable loads airborne and can carry Kimihito for a decent distance^{[ch. 24]}, and even Miia for a short trip.^{[ch. 5]} Throughout the manga, Papi has also shown to have very strong maternal instincts, be it caring for Suu, the local children she interacts with, or a batch of chicks at a farm outside of Onsen Town.^{[ch. 33]}

In Chapter 28, it is revealed that harpies are a migratory species that do not remain in one place or, in the case of personal relationships, with one person for very long, so in the case of finding a human male to mate with, they "mate with lots of human males. That way, [they] bring all kinds of new blood into [their] tribe." ^{[ch. 28]} In the Volume 7 Epilogue, Papi's mother's husband is revealed to be the local chief of police, but whether he is Papi's actual father is unknown at this time. Initially, the harpies were reluctant to take part in the Interspecies Cultural Exchange Accord program; however, Papi ran away from home "to give it a try" and seems to be the first of her species to want to remain permanently in one place with one human male.^{[ch. 28]} However, at the end of Chapter 28, Papi's mother revealed that she's always been faithful to her husband because firstly, as a "birdbrain" like Papi, she immediately forgot the rule not to stay with the same man for too much time, but especially because harpies don't follow any rules, so there isn't any problem for Papi in staying with Kurusu.^{[ch. 28]}

In Yoshino Origuchi's light novel "Monster Girls on the Job" (2020, Seven Seas Entertainment, ISBN 978-1-64827-559-3), she works as a "pop idol" along with Mero and Tionishia at the Tomas Theater as a warm-up act for the liminal music group ANM48 as part of the new Interspecies Cultural Exchange Work Program. At the climax of her act, while she is flying around the theater, she becomes blinded by the stage lights and loses her sense of direction, but thanks to a bird-call-like homing whistle from Kimihito, she is able to return to the stage safely, demonstrating that possibly harpies, like birds, have a special sense of directional awareness.

She refers to Kimihito as Boss (ご主人, Goshujin) (due to Ms. Smith's telling her that Kimihito was "the boss") in the official English translation of the manga and "'Master'" in the English dub of the anime.

=== Centorea "Cerea" Shianus ===
Voiced by: Natsuki Aikawa (Japanese); Molly Searcy (English)

Centorea Shianus (セントレア・シアヌス, Sentorea Shianusu) is a centaur and the third girl to join the household, and allows only those people closest to her to call her by the nickname "Cerea" (セレア, Serea). Her name comes from the cornflower ("Centaurea cyanus"). She is the stereotype of a Nordic person: she has yellow-blonde hair, pale blue eyes, and a massive bust, which is a complete norm among females of her species, as centaurs have large bodies from infancy and therefore require a lot of milk while growing up.^{[vol. 1: "Monster Musume Extra"]} Her "horse part" appears to be the size of a miniature horse or a large pony, with an even, light chestnut coat, no mane and small hooves and she seems to have two "sensitive" areas: the area around her tail^{[ch. 8]} and the tips of her ears.^{[ch. 36]} She is a herbivore, with a special fondness for carrots.

Like all centaurs, Centorea is a warrior, living in a nearly bare, authentic Japanese room; her Western-style armor and weapons arranged in a samurai style.^{[ch. 26]}^{[ch. 60]} Her usual style of clothing is a sleeveless white blouse and a full-length black skirt, though she has occasionally worn a skirt with a hem just above the knee.^{[vol. 9: "Monster Musume Technicolor' Kemomo' Side Story"]} Her demeanor and language are those of a medieval knight, and has sworn herself to be Kimihito's servant through a series of misunderstandings after they crashed into each other by accident and later chased a motorcycle-riding purse snatcher together.^{[ch. 4]} Although she is haughty and aloof, when she perceives a threat to Kimihito, she instantly becomes his ferocious defender. She has secret dreams of absconding with him and bearing his child, showing she has feelings for Kimihito; however, she can at times be somewhat insecure and sometimes feels unworthy of being Kimihito's "servant", but Kimihito assures her that he does trust and rely on her and has so from the beginning.^{[ch. 21]} The only other girls that manage to shake Cerea are Rachnera, whom she hates and fears yet she ultimately trusts, and Mero who gives off an aura that makes Cerea believe she stands before royalty; when she finds out that Mero "is" royalty, she is completely floored.^{[ch. 35]}

In Chapter 29, during her mother's visit, it was revealed that, since male Centaurs aren't exactly "likable" or even remotely attractive in modern times, even female Centaurs have come to dislike and be repelled by male Centaurs utterly and have recently become more interested in human males. Female Centaurs have a tradition of finding male humans to use as "teasers" so they can breed;^{[ch. 29]} "teasers" are selected from human exchange students, emphasizing that the more attractive they are the better so that the female centaurs would become "warmed up."^{[vol. 7: "Meeting of the Mothers"]} However, her mother defied this tradition and bred with her "teaser" instead, making Cerea a centaur-human cross-breed.

In Yoshino Origuchi's light novel "Monster Girls on the Job" (2020, Seven Seas Entertainment, ISBN 978-1-64827-559-3), she works as a "maid" at Café Marsha, a Maid café in Akihabara, along with Manako under Ren Kunanzuki's supervision as part of the new Interspecies Cultural Exchange Work Program.

She refers to Kimihito as Master or Milord (主殿, Aruji-dono).

=== Suu ===
Voiced by: Mayuka Nomura (Japanese); Monica Rial (English)

Suu (スー, Sū) is a Slime, an amoeba-like creature that can change shape and color without effort, and the fourth to join the group. Her basic shape is a glob with two dark eyespots that tend to glow like cat's eyes when backlit, and with a single pseudopod on top, which she can use to read people's thoughts and feelings on contact.^{[ch. 13]}

As Suu's race is currently not fully classified under the Accord, she enters Kimihito's home without permission or Ms. Smith's knowledge; the rest of the household takes pity on her and wants her to stay. Ms. Smith rejects any connection with her, yet still leaves her in the house, reasoning that dealing with Suu will not add to her salary and is therefore a pointless endeavour.

It is impossible to determine her age or whether gender actually applies to her. In her first appearance, she took the appearance of a young woman and mimicked the other girls' behavior in a successful attempt to show friendliness. Her size varies with her water content: when holding only a small amount of water, Suu will appear to be a young teenager, and will become taller and more mature-looking as she takes in more water. However, contact with too much water can result in the dissolution of her body's cohesion and possible death. Different types of water affect Suu differently: Hard water makes her super-intelligent^{[ch. 31]}, and seawater makes her super-maternal.^{[ch. 361]} If Suu wears a special waterproof full-body suit, she can enter water.^{[ch. 35]} On two occasions she has grown to giant-size, with a corresponding increase in her intelligence, by accidentally ingesting certain chemicals: first when she was knocked into some illegally dumped nutrients by a rampaging Kii,^{[ch. 20]}, then after she was injected with liminal Royal Jelly while being trying to protect Kimihito from another giant-sized slime liminal.^{[ch. 54]}

Suu usually wears a yellow rubberized raincoat and boots out of necessity, as any other clothes will get soaked in slime, and all small objects will pass through her membrane skin and stay suspended in her body fluid.^{[ch. 9]} The only time when Suu can be dangerous is when she is severely dehydrated—then she will attack anybody to gather their sweat and other fluids; this will usually end up as sexual assault on the other girls.^{[ch. 10]} She later learns to use these assaults for her own advantage, and her favorite assault target is Rachnera. Any "attacks" on Kimihito seem to be more affectionate rather than out of actual need for water, and ever since she nursed him when he caught a cold, Kimihito has become very fond of Suu as well.

At first, she didn't speak; she usually used her top tentacle to gauge feelings, and there was some confusion about her ability to understand spoken language. Still, later she speaks coherently, and under the influence of toxins gets downright chatty.^{[ch. 25]} While Suu remains silent or speaks on monosyllables most of the time, she has, on occasion, had quite lengthy and intelligent conversations with Kimihito.

Suu often plays with Papi, and their combined energy can leave the others completely out of breath. She and Papi are schooled by the others daily, with a different household member teaching each day. They rank Rachnera first, as she not only teaches well and knows a lot, but she is easy and fun to interact with; Kimihito and Mero rank second, as they are simply counted as 'nice'; Centorea is ranked third due to her strict nature; and Miia falls dead last due to her inept teaching methods and lack of enthusiasm combined with her own lack of knowledge.

In Chapter 54, the President of Black Lily Innovations states that slimes "are a species that split up over and over...Apparently [dividing] into nutrient and gathering individual slimes. Then their strengths and experiences are mixed to produce further offspring. They keep dividing to produce stronger individual slimes "[and that]" even amongst other slimes...Suu has gained an extraordinary amount of experience."^{[ch. 54]} He goes on to say that if Suu were ever to be absorbed by another slime, "Most likely...Suu would be broken down...Everything unique about Suu will be absorbed, and she'll be gone."

Suu proves her devotion to Kimihito when she battles a giant-sized slime that had escaped from Black Lily's custody and taken on a humanoid form similar to hers.^{[ch. 54]} After absorbing another liminal's royal jelly, Suu herself grows to giant size and wins the battle with some help from Kimihito and Rachnera. Still, when the other slime absorbs Kimihito, Suu sacrifices herself to save him. However, before she can be completely absorbed, Kimihito saves and rescues her core, which contains everything that makes Suu herself, including her consciousness and personality.^{[ch. 55]} Since then, she has returned to her usual size.

In Yoshino Origuchi's light novel "Monster Girls on the Job" (2020, Seven Seas Entertainment, ISBN 978-1-64827-559-3), Suu gets a job as a nurse along with Lala and Doppel at a liminal-specific hospital as part of the new Interspecies Cultural Exchange Work Program. She proves surprisingly adept at massage and chiropractic therapy.

She refers to Kimihito as Master (マスター, Masutā).

=== Meroune "Mero" Lorelei du Neptune ===
Voiced by: Haruka Yamazaki (Japanese); Maggie Flecknoe (English)

Meroune Lorelei (メロウヌ・ローレライ, Merounu Rōrerai) or simply Mero (メロ) is a mermaid and the fifth girl. She has pale human skin and blue eyes; her hair and tail are pink, with yellow fins, and in private, she tends to wear a skimpy two-piece bathing suit made of fabric specially treated so it won't slide off her slippery skin.^{[ch. 17]} She's always polite and friendly, but sometimes can be unknowingly insensitive. To move around on dry land, she needs a wheelchair. In public, she wears a long dress, a hat, and frilly cuffs to hide her tail, webbed hands, and spiny ears, giving her a Gothic Lolita appearance. She can effortlessly blend in with the crew of a maid café, with a little help from Suu.^{[ch. 18]}

She initially meets Kimihito when he prevents her runaway wheelchair from crashing; later, Ms. Smith forces her into the household without asking Kimihito first. Mero projects an aura that causes people to treat her with great respect and deference, and has been treated like royalty at the local aquarium where she performed with the dolphins,^{[ch. 19]} by the staff of an airline^{[ch. 60]} and by Cerea because of it, who believes her to be of actual royalty. It is later revealed in Chapter 34 that Mero is indeed royalty, specifically a princess, as her mother is the queen of the merfolk.

She seems to have a masochistic side, as she enjoyed Miia's cooking (despite foaming from the mouth) and doesn't mind being tied up by Rachnera. She is a great fan of Hans Christian Andersen's story "The Little Mermaid" and dreams about falling in all kinds of tragic love, earning her the title of "Tragedy freak" from Miia; however, when she actually falls in love with Kimihito and sees him with Miia, she realizes that tragic love actually hurts, and in Chapter 30 the hope and possibility of becoming Kimihito's bride makes her so happy that she seems to have abandoned the dream of being his mistress (although remaining in "tragic heroine mode").^{[ch. 30]}

In Chapter 43, it is revealed that she helps defray the Kurusu family's expenses by receiving money from her mother. She would like to get a part-time job, but her mother has forbidden it, so she helps Papi and Suu with their home study as a teacher.^{[ch. 43]} In Yoshino Origuchi's light novel "Monster Girls on the Job" (2020, Seven Seas Entertainment, ISBN 978-1-64827-559-3), she works as a "pop idol" along with Papi and Tionishia at the Tomas Theater as a warm-up act for the liminal music group ANM48 as part of the new Interspecies Cultural Exchange Work Program.

She refers to Kimihito as Beloved (だんな様, Danna-sama) in the official English translation of the manga and Master in the English dub of the anime.

=== Rachnera "Rachnee" Arachnera ===
Voiced by: Sakura Nakamura (Japanese); Courtney Lomelo (English)

Rachnera "Rachnee" Arachnera (ラクネラ・アラクネラ, Rakunera Arakunera) is an Arachne and the sixth girl: her top half is human, while her bottom half is that of a gigantic spider minus the head. She has lavender hair and six red monochromatic eyes. Her spider parts, forearms, and hands are black, covered in a chitinous exoskeleton, with a pale skull pattern on her secondary abdomen. She was nicknamed "Rachnee" (ラク姉, Rakunee; lit. Big sis Rach) by Papi, and has also picked up the nickname "Spidey".

When Rachnera was introduced, she had been abandoned by her first host family and abused by the second. As a result of her prior treatment, she became embittered and mistrustful of humans, and when she heard about Kimihito, she abducted him to disprove his kindness. The plan failed, as Kimihito unwittingly managed to charm her: first by not being freaked out by her spider body by telling her that he thought her spider legs were "sexy," and then by intending to surrender to the MON team sent to arrest Rachnera while she was quietly planning to escape using him as a hostage.^{[ch. 15]}

Rachnera is clever and streetwise, thinks that it is alright to break rules as long as nobody finds out, and manipulates Ms. Smith into assigning her to Kimihito's household, much to the discomfort of Miia and Cerea, who are especially wary as Rachnera is a fearsome-looking predator.^{[ch. 16]} Rachnera enjoys annoying most of the household and hones her web-making skills by setting traps for everyone, which typically result in them being unwillingly tied up in bondage positions.^{[ch. 23]} The only one she can't ensnare is Suu, as the webs pass through her and will usually respond by launching sexual counter-assaults on her, much to the amusement of the other homestays. However, Rachera's skills as a trapper also make her an expert fisherwoman^{[ch. 35]}, and her thread-spinning skills are not only helpful in creating her own clothes from her own silk but also prove invaluable in taking down a giant-sized slime liminal trying to absorb Kimihito.^{[ch. 55]}

Coffee affects Rachnera like alcohol since Arachnes, like regular spiders, become intoxicated from caffeine.

There is no doubt that Rachnera has strong feelings for Kimihito, but she has a strange way of showing them, including tying him up in strange bondage positions; she may use this method to cover up her embarrassment at her own feelings. However, Kimihito can see past her tough exterior and understand her true feelings, which makes her even more embarrassed.^{[ch. 30]} When Lala announces that she has come for Kimihito, she initially defends him, but despite her affection for him believes Lala to be a "Grim Reaper" and quickly gives up, wanting Lala to "put him out of his misery" and "end [his] suffering", radiating utter hopelessness.^{[ch. 24]}

She helps supplement the Kurusu household finances by supplying laboratories and businesses with her silk for study, for which she charges a hefty fee.^{[ch. 43]} When she finds out that the President has sent Kimihito to work off the girls' debts at the dairy farm, she totally and completely loses her temper and punishes him in her own inimitable style.^{[ch. 57]} However, she agrees to work for him by temporarily interviewing potential homestay Hosts to help pay off the debt,^{[ch. 58]} but her wrath at learning the circumstances and Kimihito's situation at the dairy farm is terrible to behold, and she comes to get him when his farm-stay is concluded.^{[ch. 59]}

In Yoshino Origuchi's light novel "Monster Girls on the Job" (2020, Seven Seas Entertainment, ISBN 978-1-64827-559-3), she works as a bartender at Bar Zerro N along with Miia and Zombina as part of the new Interspecies Cultural Exchange Work Program.

She refers to Kimihito as Honey (ハニー, Hanī).

=== Lala ===
Voiced by: Ai Kakuma (Japanese); Carli Mosier (English)

Lala (ララ, Rara) is a Dullahan and the seventh housemate. She speaks with an Irish accent (in the anime's English dub, the accent is missing). As a Dullahan, her head is detachable from her body and can act independently, suggesting a symbiotic relationship, though it is quite upsetting for others when it accidentally falls off. She has long pale blue/gray (almost light purple) hair, skin the same color as her hair (in emotionally stressful situations, such as embarrassment, her skin turns black),^{[ch. 38]} and yellow eyes with black sclera. She carries a large, blunt scythe with a half-circle cutout^{[vol. 6: "Secrets of Lala the Dullahan"]} and wears gauntlets and a mixture of schoolgirl clothes combined with a long dustcoat of the type used in Sergio Leone's spaghetti westerns.

When she first appears, she pretends to be a "shinigami" (the near-equivalent of the Grim Reaper), and the girls actually believe the story, as she initially enters the house without her head — it had fallen off and rolled down a hill into a park.^{[ch. 23]} She declares Kimihito to be "[trembling] on the verge of Death"; in the ensuing chaos, the girls' desperate attempts to save him from her prove considerably more dangerous than her threats.

Despite her frightening demeanor, metaphor-laden language, and air of grandeur, Lala is very sociophobic and struggles to interact with strangers or to talk about her true feelings in public.^{[ch. 38]}^{[ch. 39]} Kimihito realizes that she is having a "middle school syndrome" in which she acts as if she has supernatural powers,^{[ch. 51]} and Ms. Smith has to remind Lala that bad things will happen to her if she really manages to hurt somebody, causing Lala to hide behind Kimihito. She then demands to stay at Kimihito's to "watch over him"; Ms. Smith and the other girls agree, and she becomes part of the household.^{[ch. 24]}

It is eventually revealed that she is a genuine Psychopomp,^{[ch. 30]}, and so far, Kimihito is the only one aware of this fact. However, her presence is not the reason why Kimihito hasn't yet died from his repeated injuries; she tells him that it's his own inner strength and feelings that keep him alive. Coupled with his genuine kindness towards the girls, it causes Lala to fall for him as well, though she refuses to fight over him: by her reasoning, as a dullahan, she will take possession of his soul once he finally dies, and they will be together then.^{[ch. 30]} She has also developed the habit of nearly killing Kimihito to send him to the edge of the afterlife whenever she has something serious to discuss with him, though Kimihito has no memory of these encounters when he recovers. Her powers are demonstrated when she consigns the evil spirit of Curie's father to the afterlife, but she is careful to quickly disappear before the others see that it was her.^{[ch. 51]}

In Yoshino Origuchi's light novel "Monster Girls on the Job" (2020, Seven Seas Entertainment, ISBN 978-1-64827-559-3), she works(?) as a nurse along with Suu and Doppel at the liminal-specific hospital (the same hospital where her friend Yuuhi Hajime [see "Supporting Characters" below] now goes) as part of the new Interspecies Cultural Exchange Work Program.

She generally calls other people Mortal (人間, Ningen) and to date has no nickname for Kimihito.

=== Kuroko Smith ===
Voiced by: Yū Kobayashi (Japanese); Shelley Calene-Black (English)

Kuroko Smith (墨須黒子, Sumisu Kuroko), commonly known as "Ms. Smith" or simply "Smith", is one of the coordinators of the exchange program. She is a caricature of a civil servant: lazy and goofing off whenever possible, pushing her work/responsibilities onto others, making errors she never admits to, neglecting to inform people about important information, like how liminals are affected by a full moon^{[ch. 6]} or how a host family can be reimbursed for food/grocery costs^{[ch. 25]}. Considering herself severely overworked and underpaid, she drinks vast amounts of coffee, being especially fond of Kimihito's coffee, even though he tells her it's not homemade, as well as sponging meals.

She is also apparently able to command a small army of "Men in Black" and the "MON" (Monster Ops: Neutralization) liminal SWAT team, and is backed by large financial assets. She also demonstrates a powerful presence when angry, proving capable of getting unruly individuals back in line.

She tends to behave in a friendly yet somewhat mocking manner towards Kimihito, but seems to have a great deal of respect for him because of his ability to survive day to day with his liminal houseguests. However, that hasn't stopped her from either assigning liminals to live with him or having his parents' house remodeled several times to accommodate the liminal girls living there without his consent.^{[ch. 1]} She also never hesitates to freeload off him and the MON girls for meals. In Yoshino Origuchi's light novel "Monster Girls on the Job" (2020, Seven Seas Entertainment, ISBN 978-1-64827-559-3), she maneuvers him, his homestay girls, and the MON members into participating in the new Interspecies Cultural Exchange Work Program.

She calls Kimihito Darling (だぁりんクン, Dārin-kun), sarcastically mocking Miia's pet term for him.

== The MON (Monster Ops: Neutralization) team ==
The MON (Monster Ops: Neutralization, in the Japanese version: Monsters of a New Law (モンスターズ・オブ・ア・ニューロゥ)) team is commanded by Ms. Smith.

=== Zombina ===
Voiced by: Rei Mochizuki (Japanese); Kira Vincent-Davis (English)

Zombina (ゾンビーナ) is a zombie and the field leader of MON. She is dead, but has become zombified due to being infected with an unspecified disease. She acts and moves like a normal person, except for when she remains immobile for a long time (including sleeping). Her body stiffens into a rigor mortis-like state when this happens, which she is supposed to do tai chi-similar exercises to prevent, but frequently forgets. She cannot feel physical pain and is seemingly indestructible: she has been riddled with bullets, stepped on during Kii's rampage, crushed under Tio, etc., and always appears fine afterward. Some parts of her body drop off every now and then and have to be stitched back on. At one time she deliberately detaches a body part to make Kimihito freak out, but against her will she is impressed by how calmly he takes it and that he is able to sew it back on, considering that the body part in question was her breast—and that he treats her like a normal girl; both these skills/traits, plus his courage and self-sacrifice, not only come in useful but also completely flummox her when Shiishii is pursuing her and Kimihito.^{[ch. 39]}

She likes horror films, particularly zombie films (especially with Romero-type zombies), has a well-developed, but somewhat morbid, sense of humor, which causes her to spring Doppel's pranks prematurely when helping with them^{[ch. 40]}, and a rather shrill and loud laugh. It's not certain that she can get drunk, but she can get tipsy, claiming that "Hard liquor sterilizes [her] tissues."

In Yoshino Origuchi's light novel Monster Girls on the Job (2020, Seven Seas Entertainment, ISBN 978-1-64827-559-3), she works as a bartender (although she drinks much more than she sells) at Bar Zerro N, working there with Miia and Rachnera as part of the new Interspecies Cultural Exchange Work Program.

She refers to Kimihito as Loverboy (彼氏クン, Kareshi-kun).

=== Manako ===
Voiced by: Momo Asakura (Japanese); Jad Saxton (English)

Manako, a cyclops (called "Monoeye" in the English dubbing of the anime), is a petite and polite woman with straight dark purple hair in a bob cut who suffers from very low self-esteem. She is shy, feels intensely that she is different from "ordinary" people, and sees herself as a "monster"; because of this insecurity, mischievous characters like Lilith and Doppel are easily able to toy with her. She cannot comprehend that Kimihito treats her as an ordinary girl, and his ability to literally look her in the eye without looking away leaves her totally flustered. In Chapter 42, with Kimihito's help, she begins working on overcoming her self-esteem problems, which may lead her to become infatuated with Kimihito, too.^{[ch. 42]}

Manako's personality issues stand in sharp contrast to her job: due to her extraordinarily high-resolution vision, she is a keen observer and the sniper of the MON team. Her abilities enable her to reliably, precisely, and accurately hit 5x5cm (2x2 inches) targets at a distance of 2 km in rapid fire under windy conditions,^{[ch. 11]}, making her one of the world's best snipers.

In Yoshino Origuchi's light novel Monster Girls on the Job (2020, Seven Seas Entertainment, ISBN 978-1-64827-559-3), she works as a "maid" at Café Marsha, a Maid café in Akihabara, along with Centorea under Ren Kunanzuki's supervision as part of the new Interspecies Cultural Exchange Work Program.

To date, Manako does not have a nickname for Kimihito; in the official English translation of the manga, she is currently the only liminal to address him by his actual first name;^{[ch. 42]} in the Japanese version, she refers to Kimihito as 彼氏さん (Kareshi-san), which in this case translates as "Mr. Boyfriend".

=== Tionishia ===
Voiced by: Yurika Kubo (Japanese); Christina Stroup (English)

Tionishia (ティオニシア), or Tio, is an ogre, but contrary to traditional and popular conceptualization of ogres, she is very attractive, with long blonde hair and darkly tanned skin. At approximately 2.26 meters (7'5"), she is unnaturally tall and has a short, sharp horn with a square cross-section on her forehead.^{[ch. 11]} She is relatively well-proportioned, except for a large bust that makes Centorea's look average, even though she seems to be eating snacks most of the time. While on duty with MON, she wears heavy-duty ballistic armor, is resourceful and determined, and serves as a living tank to protect and liberate hostages. Off work, she's into all sorts of girlish clothing, pop music, and cute things.

Despite her size and strength, Tio manages to act non-threatening, capable of easing those around her with her warm embrace and kind demeanor;^{[ch. 22]} the warm, calming, and soothing aura she exudes affects anyone, human or liminal, who comes within her embrace.^{[ch. 41]} She is delighted that Kimihito is a skillful tailor and can alter human clothing to fit her, as due to her size, most of her outfits must be custom made.

In Yoshino Origuchi's light novel Monster Girls on the Job (2020, Seven Seas Entertainment, ISBN 978-1-64827-559-3), she works as a "pop idol" along with Papi and Mero at the Tomas Theater as a warm-up act for the liminal music group ANM48 as part of the new Interspecies Cultural Exchange Work Program.

She refers to Kimihito as Snookums (彼氏ちゃん, Kareshi-chan).

=== Doppel ===
Voiced by: Saori Ōnishi (Japanese); Emily Neves (English)

Doppel (ドッペル, Dopperu) calls herself a doppelgänger (and "The Faceless One")^{[vol. 10: Technicolor "Watching the MON Girls Wake Up" Side Story]}, but is actually a shapeshifter.^{[vol. 3: "Doppelganger: Doppel's Delights"]} Her usual form is that of a 14 to 18-year-old girl with grey-brown skin, clad only in a whirl of her own ankle-long white hair, and her sclera are black, although her genuine form is hinted to be very Lovecraftian^{[ch. 40]}. In MON, Doppel usually uses her abilities for infiltration; in one case, when Ms. Smith is not allowed to harm a liminal criminal under the Interspecies Accord, she impersonates Ms. Smith and completes the job to perfection.^{[ch. 11]}

Doppel is mischievous and easily bored, and doesn't mind messing with people just for fun and excitement.^{[ch. 22]}^{[ch. 40]} It is later revealed that she was the one who sent a threatening note to Kimihito, promising him death if he ever got married, with the hopes that it would force him to choose one of the girls to marry rather than keep amassing a "harem."^{[ch. 22]} When a second threatening letter arrives, she is suspected of writing it too, until it is revealed that Lala was the actual sender.

To date, Doppel is the only MON member who doesn't seem to feel any romantic attraction to Kimihito, but she convinces (i.e., blackmails) him into helping her with some of her pranks, and he gets her to wear clothes, much to the shock of the other MON members.^{[ch. 40]}

In Yoshino Origuchi's light novel Monster Girls on the Job (2020, Seven Seas Entertainment, ISBN 978-1-64827-559-3), she works as a nurse along with Suu and Lala at the liminal-specific hospital as part of the new Interspecies Cultural Exchange Work Program.

She refers to Kimihito as Buddy (彼氏ィ, Kareshii).^{[ch. 40]}

== Supporting characters ==
=== The Couple ===
Man Voiced by: Daiki Hamano
Woman Voiced by: Ayaka Shimizu

A human man and woman who occasionally appear as minor antagonists. They are irresponsible, vulgar, obnoxious, and virulently xenophobic towards liminals, viciously deriding them whenever they see one.^{[ch. 2]}^{[ch. 9]} The man is even more malevolent than his girlfriend, with him and his gang once attempting to rape Centorea. However, with each encounter, they tend to get their comeuppance, usually at the hands of Kimihito or Rachnera. The woman is known to be a follower of the ganguro fashion trend.

=== Policeman ===
An average and unnamed police officer who has had quite a few run-ins with Kimihito and the gang. First introduced when arriving late on the scene after Kimihito, Papi, and Miia have rescued a little girl from a tree (a call he was originally supposed to handle).^{[ch. 2]} He doesn't seem to handle frightening situations very well, often inspecting a certain location and wanting to leave because he finds the place too unnerving, or totally freaking out upon seeing Kimihito holding Lala's detached head to the point of actually pointing a gun at him.^{[ch. 25]} He also consistently tends to be late in responding to important calls.

In the anime, his appearances are much more frequent than in the manga. Okayado revealed on Twitter that without his hat, the Policeman bears a strong resemblance to the Eight Brothers from the original Monster Musume no Iru Nichijou series.

=== JK Mako-chan ===
"Mako-chan" (魔女っ子JK魔子ちゃん, Majokko JK Mako-chan; Magic Girl JK Mako-chan) is the titular character of a fictional magical girl/erotic manga series appearing in Monster Musume. Doppel often uses her likeness as a disguise.^{[ch. 11]}^{[ch. 40]}

=== Kasegi aka "The Director" ===
Voiced by: Keiji Fujiwara (Japanese); Steven Finley (English)

A human and a con artist who claims to be associated with the exchange project and bullies his way into Kimihito's house on the pretext of making a documentary while using the alias "Kasegi". Using his ability to manipulate people, he attempts to create an exploitation film about the girls to steal Papi's egg and Miia's cast-off skin,^{[ch. 14]} but is ultimately foiled by Suu and Kimihito. It is later revealed that he has kept Rachnee in his house under near-prison conditions for financial gain by selling her silk. After Rachnee has had enough of him, she wraps him up with her web and leaves him to be arrested by the police. His current fate and whereabouts are unknown.

In Chapter 55, it is revealed that he is the older, but worthless, brother of the President of the as-yet-unnamed corporation, and that before he kidnapped Kimihito, Rachnera tried to bargain with the President: her safety in return for keeping the brothers' relationship secret.^{[ch. 55]}

=== Polt ===
Voiced by: Shiina Natsukawa (Japanese); Christina Kelly (English)

Polt (ポルト, Poruto) is a kobold. She is the leader of the local gym, the "Sports Club Kobold", and seems to be rather hyperactive.^{[ch. 17]} Sport is her life, and she strives to provide the best possible experience for her customers. She is depicted as a fur-clad humanoid with a dog-like tail and ears—she even wears a leather collar—but with a flatter, human-like face. She usually wears shorts, a T-shirt, and track shoes. Polt seems to be trusted more than other liminals: she has her own business and is allowed to go out on her own.^{[ch. 25]} When Draco and Lilith are placed on parole for being out without host family supervision, Polt is placed in charge of them.^{[ch. 25]} She also provides a full-sized stadium as the venue for the duel between Cerea and her mother. She appears at the Inter-Species Cultural Exchange Exposition, running a booth showcasing exercise machines, but her demonstration of one of them leaves the male human viewers a little overstimulated.^{[ch. 48]} In Yoshino Origuchi's light novel Monster Girls on the Job (2020, Seven Seas Entertainment, ISBN 978-1-64827-559-3), she comes up with the idea of starting up a casino and convinces Kimihito to help her test out the beta version; however, her client eventually rejects her proposal and she abandons the idea.

=== Kii ===
Voiced by: Asami Seto (Japanese); Tiffany Terrell (English)

Kii (キー, Kī) is a dryad. She is neither human nor plant but a forest spirit, and was kidnapped at a young age by human criminals who Ms. Smith arrested after their car crashed while trying to escape. On one of her illegal non-supervised flights, Papi rescued her from the crash and planted her out in the forest; unfortunately, Papi forgot about her, and Kii was poisoned by illegally dumped chemical waste.^{[ch. 20]} After Kii has grown to a gigantic size and become deeply resentful of humans, Papi, Suu, and Kimihito manage to detoxify her, albeit in an embarrassing manner, so she becomes normal again. Later, while still wary of humans, she lets Kimihito and Suu collect edible plants from the forest she protects, as long as they do no harm.^{[ch. 25]} She now regards Papi and Suu as her friends, but barely tolerates others. She originally appeared to have a slight crush on Kimihito, but now regards him as "completely useless".^{[ch. 41]} In Yoshino Origuchi's light novel Monster Girls on the Job (2020, Seven Seas Entertainment, ISBN 978-1-64827-559-3), Polt convinces her to act as a poker dealer at Polt's casino, where she cleans Kimihto out.

Depending on available nutrients, Kii's size can vary a lot. She appears as half-human, half-tree, with leaves for hair and her clothes. The discovery and use of a natural hot spring in her forest have led to speculation that Kii comes from a much warmer climate than Japan's, with the colder weather causing depression.^{[ch. 41]}

=== Draco ===
Voiced by: Airi Ootsu (Japanese); Rachel Landon (English)

Draco (ドラコ, Dorako) is a Dragonewt, a lizard-like creature with dragon wings (which are not strong enough to allow her to fly) and a powerful tail. Draco dresses in style with elegant pants, a shirt, and a heavy trench coat. Draco attempts to chat up Miia when she and Kimihito (with Mero in tow) visit the local aquarium, but quickly starts bad-mouthing Kimihito and actually ends up groping Miia. After Kimihito rescues Miia, it is discovered that "he" is actually female and a lesbian.^{[ch. 19]}

Draco is blind to her own failings — she boasts about herself either out of narcissism or attempting to cover a bad case of self-doubt — and attempts to attack Kimihito, seeing him as an obstacle to Miia's heart, only to be thwarted by Suu.^{[ch. 25]} After her first encounter with Miia and Kimihito, she is taken into custody by Ms. Smith and MON for being out without her host family and punished by being made to run a 40-kilometer marathon supervised by Polt; later, she is made to join Polt on a fishing expedition. Later, she turns her attention to Liz, but her brash advances don't work, and her attempts to apologize to Miia for her previous behavior end up in a muddle of misunderstandings with both Miia and Liz.^{[ch. 40]} She appears at the Inter-species Cultural Exchange Exposition as the tester for a home heating system, but is totally ignored by Miia and almost immediately suffers even more embarrassment when the swimsuit she is supposed to wear turns out to be for the wrong gender, as her employers didn't realize she was female.^{[ch. 48]} She follows Miia to her homeland, only to be ambushed and "molested" by the overly passionate Lamias, who, while discovering their mistake in assigning Draco's gender, apparently don't care.^{[ch. 63]} In Yoshino Origuchi's light novel Monster Girls on the Job (2020, Seven Seas Entertainment, ISBN 978-1-64827-559-3), Polt convinces Draco at act as a "doggy-girl" (as opposed to "bunny-girl") waitress at Polt's casino; Draco agrees only because she thought Miia was going to be there.

=== Lilith ===
Voiced by: Atsumi Tanezaki (Japanese); Hilary Haag (English)

Lilith (リリス, Ririsu) is a Lesser Devil or Imp. Although an adult, she is petite, the size of a child, and usually wears a hoodie to hide her horns, bat wings, and tail. A generally unpleasant person, she derives great joy from provoking people and sowing discord, and is not above using her appearance to make people believe she is merely an innocent child. She easily blindsides both Manako and Centorea, but is caught in the act by Rachnera; after Lilith makes the mistake of mocking Rachnera's insecurity about her spider body, Rachnera abducts and turns Lilith into her personal "toy," which she enjoys, revealing that she's a masochist.^{[ch. 21]}

After her encounter with Kimihito and Centorea, she is taken into custody for being out without her host family and punished by being made to run a 40-kilometer marathon supervised by Polt. On another occasion, she tries her hypnotic tricks on Kimihito, but her hypnosis doesn't work on him. She tries to physically molest him and use the evidence to blackmail him into making Rachnera leave his house and be with her, but is caught and "punished" Rachnera-style by Doppel, disguised as Rachnera.^{[ch. 40]} In Yoshino Origuchi's light novel Monster Girls on the Job (2020, Seven Seas Entertainment, ISBN 978-1-64827-559-3-shows up at the Bar Zerro N (where she seems to be a regular customer) and a few nights later at Polt's casino as a roulette croupier.

=== The Orcs ===
The Orcs are humanoid, talking pigs.^{[ch. 11]} They have a keen sense of smell—they can detect things up to a kilometer away. Apart from that, there is minimal improvement over their four-legged family members, especially in intelligence. The only seen Orcs were part of a small terrorist group demanding an increase in Orc content in mainstream erotic manga until they were apprehended by MON.^{[ch. 11]} The head orc returns illegally and tries to molest both Draco and Lilith (both Doppel in disguise and the real one), but is apprehended by Doppel with some help from Kimihito.^{[ch. 40]}

=== Ren Kunanzuki ===
Voiced by: Akane Fujita (Japanese); Juliet Simmons (English)

Ren Kunanzuki (九菜月 レン, Kunanzuki Ren) is the daughter of Rachnera's first host family, who "sold" Rachnera to Kasegi because she accidentally slashed Ren with her claws when Ren startled her. Ren wants to convince Rachnera to come back to her house, that she and her parents are genuinely sorry for what happened, and that things will be different, but Rachnera doesn't believe her. She spends an entire day with the girls, believing their behavior is a series of tests to see if she's capable of handling Rachnee;^{[ch. 26]} among the many things she ends up doing include: trying to eat Miia's cooking, allowing herself to be molested by Suu and wearing one of Mero's Gothic Lolita outfits.

Ren is so determined to prove she can overcome any trial or challenge that she does not hesitate to trash-talk the girls. Kimihito hears her out, but, to both Ren and Rachnera's amazement, denies her request because he thinks she only sees Rachnera living with her and her family as a challenge rather than as a family member. While she accepts his reasoning, it seems she still believes it is some test; she leaves vowing to return when she has "turned over a new leaf" and proven "that [she] can overcome this trial too!"

In Yoshino Origuchi's light novel Monster Girls on the Job (2020, Seven Seas Entertainment, ISBN 978-1-64827-559-3), Ren has taken a job as a "maid" at Café Marsha, a Maid café in Akihabara, to "get some practice at being polite" as a way of making up for her previous behavior, and acts as supervisor/mentor to Centorea and Manako when they come to work there as part of the new Interspecies Cultural Exchange Work Program.

=== Miia's Mother ===
Her name is not currently known. Like Miia, she is a Lamiai, and she appears, on the surface, relatively young, though her actual age is unknown. She is extremely forward, with her intentions to find a "Tribal Husband," going so far as poisoning all the girls of the Kurusu household with a paralytic toxin to force Kimihito and Miia into a shotgun wedding. While she puts the needs of the Tribe before herself, she cares deeply about Miia and eventually consents to leaving Kimihito alone with Miia after seeing his determination and kind nature. However, this does not stop her from trying to sleep with him herself in competition with Miia, only for both of them to be captured and stopped by a hungover and irritated Rachnera.^{[ch. 27]}

She appears to be a leader among her people, and when it appears that there is a danger that the serpentine races will withdraw from the Interspecies Cultural Exchange Accord she summons Miia home to take part, along with Kimihito, in a "tournament" to determine which of the four serpentine species will dominate the others, with the hope that the Lamias (who were in favor of being part of the Accord) will win, and she is totally stunned when she learns that Miia and Kimihito have lived together for so long without engaging in sexual relations;^{[ch. 61]} it is later revealed that her motives in having Kimihito take part were not completely altruistic.^{[ch. 63]}

=== Papi's Mother ===
Like Miia's mother, she is very young, but she is visually identical to Papi, except for her long, bleached hair and tanned skin. She sent a letter to Papi, but accidentally enclosed a picture of herself with her husband to Papi with the letter, resulting in a mix-up in which Kimihito and the others assumed that Papi was the harpy in the picture and in which Papi assumed that her mother had come to take her home, as Harpies do not stay in one place for too long due to their free nature as a species.

She eventually cleared up the entire situation by revealing the truth of the photo: it had been taken before Papi was born, and she had only changed her appearance later to match her husband's taste. With Papi and Kimihito confused about why Papi's mother was still staying with her husband, she revealed that harpies don't follow any rules, so there's no problem with Papi staying with Kimihito.

=== Centorea's Mother ===
She came to see Centorea under the pretext of meeting her daughter's 'teaser'. When Centorea revealed that Kimihito was not a "teaser" and that she intended to disobey the custom by serving him as her master, her mother refused to accept it, leading to a duel between them. When the duel ended in a draw, Centorea's mother accepted Cerea's choice and then revealed her true intention: to prove Centorea's strength as one of half-human descent, at the same time revealing Cerea as a centaur-human cross-breed. She raised Cerea with strict ideas of Knighthood and the necessities of being a knight and serving one's master, which often manifest in Cerea's personality and ideals.

=== Yukio ===
A Yuki-onna or "Snow-Woman" who works as the proprietor of the Sno-Ball Hot Springs Inn, a mixed-gender onsen or hot springs resort catering to both liminals and humans; however, her cold, rather intimidating demeanor drives away human customers. She is a tall, elegant woman with pale blue skin and no pupils, with the power to control ice. To withstand the heat in some regions of the resort, she wears a special environmental suit. She told Kimihito that she chose to work as a proprietor after her home stay, when she fell in love with the young owner of the resort, and now she trains herself to withstand the heat better. Thanks to Cerea's advice, she now organizes dating events at the mixed baths for both humans and liminals to attract customers. She also eventually learns to smile.^{[ch. 31]} Thanks to the help and some ideas from Kimihito and the girls, the Sno-Ball Inn becomes a highly successful venue for humans and liminals to meet and interact, especially for "Mix 'n' Match" couples events.^{[ch. 64]}

=== Ils Nineta ===
Ils Nineta (ルズ・ナインティ, Ruzu Nainti) is a Nine-tailed fox (九尾の狐, Kyūbi no Kitsune) who's having her home stay at a shrine in the same area as Yukio's resort. In her default form, she looks like a girl with the fur, ears, nose, and teeth of a fox, as well as nine fox tails. Like Doppel, she can transform into nearly anything, but that only applies to herself, not her clothes. Since her shrine is having some financial issues, Kimihito, Miia, and Rachnee help her stage a Magical Girl show to attract visitors. She transforms into an older version of herself while Rachnera weaves clothes for her during the act. The show is successful, and a group of guys ask to work with her in future shows. The shrine priest eventually finds out, and she's punished by being denied her favorite Inari sushi;^{[ch. 32]} however, this does not stop her from trying to start the show up again.^{[ch. 43]}

=== Cathyl ===
A Minotaur that is having her home stay at a dairy farm alongside Merino, Ton, and Cott. She's a very tall and muscular woman, with a statuesque height of 2.31 meters (7'6"),^{[vol. 8: "The Secrets of Cathyl, Merino, Ton & Cott"]} with bull horns, a long black and white ponytail, hoofed feet, and a cow-tail and ears. As a "milk minotaur", Cathyl also possesses Q-cup-sized breasts that require frequent milking and ends up insisting that Kimihito do it. However, although milk minotaurs as a whole tend to be calm and reserved, Cathyl is unusually emotional,^{[vol. 8: "The Secrets of Cathyl, Merino, Ton & Cott"]} and due to her short temper her relationship with the ranch's owner was in trouble when she thought he was having affairs with other women.^{[ch. 33]} She appears at the Interspecies Cultural Exchange Exposition with Merino running a Milking Experience booth, milking cows and sheep, to Kimihito's relief.^{[ch. 48]} When Kimihito starts working at the Black Lily Innovations dairy farm she is helping run for the President, despite uncompromising attitude she seems to have pleasant memories of Kimihito's previous interaction with her^{[ch. 43]} and asks him to help relieve her backed-up milk problem, since she hates using the milking machines.^{[ch. 56]} When the other Minotaur girls find out that Kimihito is helping her "express" by hand, they all start demanding "personal service", which, for some personal reason, makes her even more bad-tempered.^{[ch. 57]}

=== Merino ===
A Pan who is having her home stay at a dairy farm alongside Cathyl, Ton, and Cott. She's a young woman with ram-like horns and rectangular pupils, whose body is covered in wool that needs to be sheared periodically.^{[vol. 8: "The Secrets of Cathyl, Merino, Ton & Cott"]} She asks Kimihito to shear her, but after the ranch's owner brings in new helpers later on, she no longer has to worry about getting sheared.^{[ch. 33]} She appears at the Inter-species Cultural Exchange Exposition with Cathyl running the Milking Experience booth.^{[ch. 48]} She is next seen helping to run the Black Lily Innovations dairy farm with Cathyl.^{[ch. 56]} She tries to protect Kimihito when the Satyr girls start coming onto him by offering herself as a "test subject" to teach proper milking techniques.^{[ch. 58]}

=== Cott & Ton ===
A pair of Vegetable Lamb of Tartary twins who are having their home stay at a dairy farm alongside Cathyl and Merino. They're twins with tanned skin, small goat horns, and somewhat mischievous dispositions. Similar to Merino, they have fleece-like cotton on their bodies that also needs to be sheared on occasion, and no longer have to worry about the problem after the ranch owner brings in new helpers.^{[ch. 33]}

=== Liz and Kinu ===
A pair of rather dim-witted agents from a private security company in charge of protecting V.I.P. liminals. Liz is a Lizard and, like Draco, has scales and a lizard tail, while Kinu is an Oni: tall with reddish skin and two short horns. While Liz chides Kinu for being foolish, she's no better herself since she's a terrible driver. They were hired to guard someone classified as "X.O." and believed that person was Suu, so they carried her around throughout the day. When they believed Lala was following them, they hid with Kimihito inside a locker and later confronted Draco and Lilith, only to be stopped by Ms. Smith. It turns out that the person they were actually hired to protect was Mero (メロ), and she motivates them not to give up on their jobs.^{[ch. 34]} They also enjoy playing role-playing games.^{[ch. 40]}

=== Sebasstian and Flounnder ===
Sebasstian (サバスチャン, Sabasuchan) and Flounnder (ポチョムキンメ, Pochomukinme) are a pair of Fishfolk and butlers sent to bring Mero home under orders from Mero's Mother, the Mermaid Queen. Both look like humanoid fish with arms and legs, and with webbing between their fingers. Fishfolk are capable of breathing air and, ironically enough, are more capable on land than the far more humanoid Mermaids thanks to their functioning legs.^{[ch. 35]} They are totally terrified of being blamed for anything, and when Mero went missing, they stayed back while Kimihito and the girls did all the work, since they didn't want to lose their jobs for bargaining with Octo on a previous occasion.^{[ch. 36]} Their names are based on the secondary characters from Disney'sThe Little Mermaid franchise.

=== Octo ===
A Scylla that apparently kidnapped Mero. She looks like a young woman with octopus tentacles instead of legs, octopus pupils, and tentacles for hair. After Miia and Cerea were incapacitated by the giant anemones guarding her cave, and after she tried to seduce Kimihito, she and Rachnera ended up in a standoff. The standoff was broken by Suu, who proceeded to molest both of them. Once everyone calms down, she and Rachnera develop a mutual respect for each other and their techniques. It turns out that she hadn't kidnapped Mero, she simply wanted her help in dealing with a bothering situation: Octo has no magic abilities whatsoever, but people seeking magical solutions to their problems keep on bothering her, so she wanted Mero to use her authority as a princess to clear the misunderstanding; her reputed "evil magical powers" are also being blamed for the rise in merpeople elopement with humans. Unfortunately, Mero has no real authority, but Kimihito's idea to clear up the misunderstandings about Octo leads Mero to suggest they address the problem to her mother, the Mermaid Queen.^{[ch. 36]} Eventually, the misunderstanding is cleared up. Octo later takes a side job at Yukio's Sno-Ball Hot Springs Inn, dispensing advice to the love-lorn liminals and humans staying there.

=== The Mermaid Queen (aka: Mero's Mother) ===
Mero's mother and the ruler of the Mermaid Kingdom, whose husband, the King (a human), eloped with a mermaid. She orders Mero to end her homestay with Kimihito and has been deceiving her people into believing that human-merfolk relations are collapsing because of elopements between them and that Octo is both responsible for this and trying to harm Mero.^{[ch. 36]} It turns out that she is even more of a "tragedy freak" than her daughter, that she is secretly involved with a human male, and that she has done all this to create a gigantic tragedy.

She tries to kill Kimihito to make Mero remember "how sweet Tragic Romance can taste!",^{[ch. 37]} but she ends up putting Mero and herself in peril as well when her trap devices go haywire. Mero's willingness, even though she is injured by the Queen's actions, to sacrifice herself to save Kimihito makes the Queen change her mind, and she informs her people about her human lover (without revealing her deception) and that relationships between merfolk and humans are allowed. She continues to make her presence felt in her daughter's life by introducing certain innovations to Kimihito's house without his approval or even his knowledge^{[ch. 45]} and buying her daughter a brand-new (and motorized) wheelchair.^{[ch. 51]}

=== Yuuhi Hajime ===
Yuuhi Hajime (一 夕日, Hajime Yūhi)^{[vol. 10: "The Secrets of Shiishii"]} is a young, terminally ill girl that Lala befriends while visiting Kimihito in the hospital. To save Yuuhi's life without breaking the rules she as a "guide of lost souls" must follow, Lala turns a willing Yuuhi into a Zombie using one of Zombina's teeth, which she stole from her,^{[ch. 38]} an action for which it is later learned her parents are extremely grateful, although the MON girls have to be suspended from duty (a move to appease the press; it actually amounts to less than a slap on the wrist).^{[ch. 39]}

=== Shiishii ===
A Jiangshi from Taiwan and an old acquaintance of Zombina who is apparently desperate to get herself a Japanese marriage partner to attend fujoshi/yaoi events more easily; hence, she would frequently smuggle herself into Japan despite strict supervision by the Cultural Exchange Bureau. She is a regular practitioner of Tai Chi, which helps her in overcoming her rigor mortis, making her unusually agile for her kind, who generally move about in short hops due to the aforementioned rigor mortis. Very skilled with throwing weapons, she managed to dismember Zombina but, thanks to Kimihito's assistance, was defeated by Zombina's special rock salt bullets. After admitting defeat, she becomes curious about Kimihito and Zombina's relationship. She and Zombina end up dragging Kimihito to a doujinshi event as their "date".^{[ch. 39]}

=== Kiira the Killer Bee ===
An insect-type liminal derived from the Japanese giant hornet, she is described by Ms. Smith as one of three dangerous illegal or "rogue" liminals who have entered Japan. She has two compound eyes and three "simple" or "Non-compound eyes", two antennae on her head, teeth powerful enough to bite through Rachnera's thread, four insectoid wings (two fore wings and two hind wings), four black-striped arms ending in three-fingered claws, a striped abdomen protruding from the middle of her back ending in a venom-bearing stinger, and two black-striped humanoid legs ending in elongated two-toed feet.^{[vol. 11: "The Buzz on Kiira the Killer Bee"]} She also can control bees and hornets.

While Kimihito and Centorea (with Rachnera lurking close by) are camping in Kii's forest, Kiira attacks Kimihito but is temporarily driven off by Centorea.^{[ch. 44]} Kimihito and Centorea trick Kiira into pursuing them and trap her inside a sauna built by Polt, where the heat overcomes her. After she recovers, Kiira reveals that she was not after Kimihito but rather Rachnera, since the Arachne was indirectly responsible for Kiira's original deportation and directly responsible for Kiira's humiliation while they were both waiting for one-on-one study-abroad eligibility interviews.^{[vol. 11: "Origin Story"]} After apologizing to Kimihito for trying to use him as a proxy, Kiira warns him that the other two illegal liminals that entered alongside her are truly dangerous.^{[ch. 45]}

=== Kino ===
A young Matango, she is described by Ms. Smith as one of three "rogue" liminals who have entered Japan illegally. She has two arms and legs, a large mushroom cap on her head, dreadlock-type head tentacles which look like hair, volva-like toe-less feet, frills on her body which might be mistaken for clothing but which in fact are part of her own body, and a rather shy personality. Her four-fingered hands are large compared to her body, and she has cross-shaped pupils.^{[vol. 11: "Mysteries of Kino the Matango"]}

As a fungus-like creature, Kino constantly releases a certain amount of highly hallucinogenic spores; when she gets nervous, scared, or flustered, she unconsciously releases far more. As a result, her entire species was classified as "dangerous" and prohibited from entering Japan. Despite this, and because she wanted to make friends, Kino contacted an underworld broker who illegally smuggled her into the country alongside Kiira and a third liminal. However, much to Kino's confusion, instead of accepting money, the broker demanded that she wander around the Kurusu house, which she did until Papi found her and brought her into the house. After her spores are neutralized thanks to one of the modifications made by Mero's mother, Kino apologizes for the trouble she caused and warns Kimihito that the last illegal liminal scares even her.^{[ch. 46]}

=== Curie Drakulya ===
A vampire and the third of the three "rogue" liminals who have entered Japan illegally. She is of medium height, with A-cup breasts, long straight silver-colored hair and pointed ears, and wears a floor-length caped robe with a blue-and-gold ornate collar,^{[vol. 12: "Secrets of Curie the Vampire"]} a headband with the same design as her robe's collar, and thick-soled boots that conceal her four-toed talon-like feet. Like Papi, she has wings with a talon-like thumb, but wears artificial hands specially designed for winged liminal species, which make her appear more human.^{[ch. 50]} Her most treasured possession is a locket with an upside-down crucifix on its surface containing a photograph of her and her deceased father, Wladislaus. She appears to have a rather retiring personality, but after sundown, she assumes a very menacing persona, which is actually the spirit of her father residing in her locket, compelling her to commit evil acts.^{[ch. 51]} Curie seems to be the least vampiric vampire ever: she's terrified of dark enclosed spaces, flying and bats, and even the sight of non-artificial blood makes her nauseous.^{[ch. 50]} It's revealed that she is actually one of the few surviving vampires left, as much of her kind has died off, since they have a very weak constitution and have been unable to turn others into vampires over the past centuries, as there is a low chance of the vampire virus taking effect. Because of this, her species is on the verge of extinction.

She is introduced at the end of Chapter 46 when she attacks Zombina, but fails because Zombina has no blood to drink — only a formaldehyde-based fluid. Curie retreats to the Inter-species Cultural Exchange Exposition, where she is found in a specially darkened room for nocturnal liminals by Papi.^{[ch. 48]} While Papi befriends Curie, calling her "Kyuuri", which is Japanese for "cucumber",^{[ch. 49]} Ms. Smith uses Kimihito's blood as bait to draw Curie out. However, things go horribly wrong when Curie attacks and kidnaps Kimihito while Ms. Smith is otherwise "occupied" via drinking and having a good time.^{[ch. 49]} Because Kimihito is covered in bite marks and looked to be dying from blood loss, Curie assumed that she had turned him into a vampire slave; however, he turns out to be unharmed and makes an iron-rich lunch for her "since [she] was so pale [he] thought she looked anemic".^{[ch. 51]}

In Chapter 59.5, it is learned that she had been given a house with a pool to live in by Black Lily Innovations, but found it too big to live in by herself; fortunately, Leechi, Moskii and Yatsume, who hadn't been able to find a host family at the Matching Party at the Interspecies Expo and who been trying to find a place to share, overheard her and immediately proposed themselves as housemates. She has her own room, but sleeps in a closet, hanging upside down from the clothing bar. Thanks to her housemates' encouragement, she is now able to drink blood and has become more energetic at night.^{[ch. 59.5]}

=== The President ===
Currently known as "Mr. President", he is formally introduced in the manga in Chapter 53 as the head of Black Lily Innovations, a corporation which he calls "a perfectly legal Extra-species immigration intermediary".^{[ch. 53]}. However, unlike the official government Interspecies Cultural Exchange, Black Lily Innovations charges liminals a considerable fee for bringing them into the country; to cover that fee, the liminals work for him, "providing" (as in making) products that only liminals can produce, such as killer bee venom, matango spores, and lamia skin shella. He is revealed as the person responsible for bringing Kiira, Kino, and Curie into the country, and at one time, tried unsuccessfully to get Rachnera to sell him her silk. It is also revealed that Rachnera had seriously considered calling The President for help when she was about to be arrested for assaulting Kasegi, but Kimihito's winning her over prevented that.

It is rather difficult to define his personality, as he alternates between seeming genuinely to care about the liminals who work for his corporation and seeming more concerned with the profits the liminal products bring. He comes across as rather "smarmy" and doesn't really fool anyone who really knows him; in fact, Rachnera states that he likes "to pose like everything is 'for someone else's benefit'" when he and/or his company will really be the ones to gain^{[ch. 56]}; when he tries to convince Kimihito's girls to work for him, Ms. Smith firmly intervenes^{[ch. 53]} and Rachnera firmly refuses his offer of a major position in Black Lily Innovations.^{[ch. 56]} However, he is more than able to hold his own against Ms. Smith in an argument over liminals and the ethics involved between how the Interspecies Cultural Exchange program supposedly helps liminals and how his business supposedly helps them. He is very skilled at exploiting loopholes in the Interspecies Cultural Exchange Act, such as a dairy farm owned by his company, run by female Minotaurs and Pans, that secretly and illegally sells Minotaur and Pan milk.^{[ch. 55]}

Employees of Black Lily Innovations kidnap Suu in an effort to lure back a giant-sized slime liminal, which Suu had allowed to escape while it was being transported to the Research Laboratory building, but the method he uses to capture the giant slime goes wrong, causing the giant slime to assume the form of a giant-sized version of Suu, and both he and Ms. Smith end up needing to be rescued by Kimihito and the girls.^{[ch. 54]}

In Chapter 55, it is revealed that he is Kasegi's younger brother and that, before she kidnapped Kimihito, Rachnera had tried to bargain with him.^{[ch. 55]} When Rachnera finds out that he has "convinced" (blackmailed) Kimihito to work at his company's dairy farm to pay off the other girls' debts, she agrees to temporarily work for him to help pay off the debt.^{[ch. 57]} He later provides Miia, Kimihito, and the others with tickets on a liminal-friendly flight to Miia's homeland, an act that makes them all suspicious as to his motives for doing so.^{[ch. 60]}

=== The Dairy Farm Minotaur Girls ===
These are some of the more prominent Minotaur girls at Black Lily Innovations' dairy farm:

- Mil runs the farm. Described by Kimihito himself as a "big sister"-type figure to everybody who works at the farm.^{[ch. 57]} Although Mil admits she bears the burden of the farm on her shoulders, she greatly appreciates Kimihito's help and support and claims he is what truly holds the farm together. Making it clear she's smitten by him, Mil asks him to stay on at the farm permanently.^{[ch. 57]} She refers to Kimihito as "Farmboy".
- Chizu is very forward and outspoken, not hesitating to say exactly what's on her mind, even if it embarrasses Kimihito.^{[ch. 57]}
- Cara is a darker-skinned Minotaur, described by Kimihito as "the strongest girl on the farm after Cathyl".^{[ch. 57]} She is not very talkative and quite emotionally sensitive, although her always appearing upset makes the other girls afraid of her. However, Kimihito has been able to see past her outward show, and she is very helpful with some of Kimihito's minor chores.
- Urt is very timid. She seems to be the only one who prefers being milked by Kimihito in the traditional milking position, feeling "too embarrassed" when milked from the front and "too spooked" when milked from behind, making her "sessions" with Kimihito more private than the others. She has confessed to him that she believes he is the only man she can trust.^{[ch. 57]}
- Cream is described as "the shortest Minotaur on the farm" and prefers to order Kimihito about. Because of her physical size (190 centimeters tall), she is self-conscious about her breast size. To try to augment her chest size, she insists on a chest massage after every bath.^{[ch. 57]}

=== The Satyrs ===
The Satyrs are the third group of liminal girls working at the Black Lily dairy farm. Far more erotically inclined than the Minotaurs or the Pans, they originally go after Kimihito (as he's the only male there), but after learning and mastering his special "milking by hand" technique, they turn their attentions to the other girls (in their own words, they "don't have any sexual hang-ups") and practically take over the dairy farm, allowing Kimihito to go home.^{[ch. 59]} So far, they are the only species that can withstand the effects of a full moon due to "their sex drive being on 24/7" and thus retain some control over their actions at night.

=== The Bloodsucker Girls ===
These three liminal girls were introduced in Chapter 49 at the Matching Party at the Interspecies Cultural Exchange Expo and now share a house with Curie. The main thing all four girls have in common is that they all drink/like blood (they all agree that Kimihito, whom they knew only as "Number 99" at the party, had the tastiest blood):

- Leechi is a leech-type liminal. Although appearing entirely female, she is hermaphroditic, keeping her male "member" in what she calls "storage mode". Since she is entirely invertebrate, she has to wear a special exoskeletal body suit, resembling a leather catsuit (and a special exoskeletal swimsuit for swimming);^{[ch. 59.5]} in her normal form, below the chest she resembles a multi-tentacled blob (which really freaks out her housemates). She has a very brash, outgoing personality, somewhat like Zombina's.
- Moskii is a mosquito-type liminal. Her saliva contains a special anesthetic so that being stung by her proboscis will cause no pain.^{[ch. 49]} Physically, she is extremely slender, noting that "if [she] got any fatter, [she] wouldn't be able to fly".^{[ch. 59.5]}
- Yatsume is a lamprey-type mermaid liminal, with an eel-like tail rather than a mermaid's traditional fish-tail, making her resemble a lamia. Her personality seems gentler and more caring.

=== The Serpentine Races ===
There are currently four known serpentine liminal species: the Lamiai, the Echidnae, the Medusae and the Melusinae. While the actual location of their homeland is not specified, it appears to be in a Temperate climate, possibly Mediterranean, as all four races are mentioned in Greek mythology, and the buildings in Miia's home village resemble architecture on the Greek island of Santorini.^{[ch. 60]}

- The Lamiai are a town-dwelling species and seem more gregarious than their sister serpentine species.
- The Echidnae appear to be a desert-dwelling species, based on their type of traveling clothing, which resembles that of Arabian/African desert nomads.^{[ch. 61]} While fierce-looking, enhanced by tattooing, they apparently have extremely romantic natures which are masked by their outwardly tough attitude.^{[vol. 15: "Echidna/Melusine/Medusae Subspecies Secrets"]}
- The Melusinae are an aquatic serpentine species. They have small wings used for swimming rather than flying.^{[vol. 15: "Echidna/Melusine/Medusae Subspecies Secrets"]}
- The Medusae appear to be the more intellectual of the serpentibe races. Despite wearing hooded cloaks while traveling that make them appear to be a cave-dwelling species,^{[ch. 61]} they also wear business suits.^{[ch. 63]} They have a very penetrating gaze, which has led to the myth that they can turn people to stone by looking at them. Their hair, which looks like serpents, is actually tentacle-like organs.^{[vol. 15: "Echidna/Melusine/Medusae Subspecies Secrets"]}

All four species share the same ultra-passionate nature towards human males and apparently also share the same custom of "tribal husbands," in which each human male brought to the serpentine homeland for procreation is shared by every member of the Tribe. However, each race's "tribal husband" requirements are quite different: the Lamias apparently look for sexual technique or romance in a male; the Echidnae look for physical power and stamina in a male; the Melusines look for physical beauty in a male; and the Medusae apparently look for economic superiority in a male. To decide matters affecting the serpentine race, the four species hold a "tournament of manliness" in which they pit their "tribal husbands" against the other serpentine species, with the Tribe with the "most accomplished male earning dominion over all serpentine-kind".^{[ch. 61]}

=== Miia's Friends ===
Miia has three close friends in her home village: Shequa, Sanka, and Maru. They are introduced in Chapter 60, when Miia, Kimihito, and the rest of their homestays are summoned back to her homeland. However, while they are Miia's friends, she is reluctant to trust them to be anywhere near Kimihito, given their frequent attempts to seduce him.

- Shequa appears to be the eldest of Miia's friends. She is a Lamiai with blonde hair and an orange-tailed form.
- Sanka is a Lamiai with green hair and a tail with green-colored scales.
- Maru is physically the smallest and appears to be the youngest of the trio. She is a Lamiai with pink hair and a pink-tailed, pink-scaled serpent.

All three girls wear the same D-shaped hair ornament as Miia; however, it may be a standard Lamia jewelry piece, as other Lamiais in Miia's home village also wear it.

In Chapter 67, they join a tour group visiting the Sno-Ball Hot Springs Inn, where Kimihito and the girls are temporarily working to help out Yukio, and fall for three human males.^{[ch. 67]}

=== Centorea's Centaur Girl ===
These are six female centaurs, each representing a subspecies of the centaur race. Every one of them has interacted with Centorea during their debut.

- Alusia Van Dalsia is a lightweight centaur wearing sports attire with a lean physique and desires to be the fastest runner. She also has brown hair and is introduced in Chapter 68.
- Rem Nighdrem is a petite nightmare with dark skin who enjoys giving others bad dreams when they sleep. She also has white hair and is introduced in Chapter 69.
- Cheron Du Per is a heavyweight centaur with a muscular figure and tanned skin who is working as a farmer. She also has white hair and is introduced in Chapter 70.
- Meamil Airag is a busty dairy breed centaur who loves being milked and suckled by others. She also has pink hair and is introduced in Chapter 71.
- Nicole Unicole is a bespectacled unicorn with an average build and loves pop idols. She also has blond hair and is introduced in Chapter 72.
- Pegasania Bellerophon is a slim pegasus with incredible charisma and behaves strangely. She also has blond hair and is introduced in Chapter 73.

=== Arbatel ===
Arbatel is a sentient grimoire who transported the main characters, along with several others, from the real world to a fictional one where most of them lost their memories, a school named Grimoire High, which is why they behave like high school students. After being transported, she blends in with them by taking on the identity of one of them, going by the name Honma Shiori.

== Works cited ==
- Vol. 1 (ch. 1–5): オカヤド (September 2012). モンスター娘のいる日常 1 (in Japanese). 徳間書店. ISBN 978-4-19-950306-1. and Okayado (October 2013). Monster Musume, Vol. 1. National Geographic Books. ISBN 978-1-937867-90-4.
- Vol. 2 (ch. 6–10): オカヤド (February 2013). モンスター娘のいる日常 2 (in Japanese). 徳間書店. ISBN 978-4-19-950324-5. and Okayado (January 2014). Monster Musume, Vol. 2. National Geographic Books. ISBN 978-1-626920-03-3.
- Vol. 3 (ch. 11–14): オカヤド (July 2013). モンスター娘のいる日常 3 (in Japanese). 徳間書店. ISBN 978-4-19-950347-4. and Okayado (May 2014). Monster Musume, Vol. 3. National Geographic Books. ISBN 978-1-626920-31-6.
- Vol. 4 (ch. 15–18): オカヤド (November 2013). モンスター娘のいる日常 4 (in Japanese). 徳間書店. ISBN 978-4-19-950362-7. and Okayado (August 2014). Monster Musume, Vol. 4. National Geographic Books. ISBN 978-1-626920-46-0.
- Vol. 5 (ch. 19–22): オカヤド (March 2014). モンスター娘のいる日常 5 (in Japanese). 徳間書店. ISBN 978-4-19-950386-3. and Okayado (November 2014). Monster Musume, Vol. 5. National Geographic Books. ISBN 978-1-626921-06-1.
- Vol. 6 (ch. 23–26): オカヤド (September 2014). モンスター娘のいる日常 6 (in Japanese). ISBN 978-4-19-950412-9. and Monster Musume, Vol. 6. March 2015. ISBN 978-1-626921-20-7.
- Vol. 7 (ch. 27–30): モンスター娘のいる日常 7 (in Japanese). March 2015. ISBN 978-4-19-950441-9. and Monster Musume, Vol. 7. August 2015. ISBN 978-1-626921-60-3.
- Vol. 8 (ch. 31–34): モンスター娘のいる日常 8 (in Japanese). August 2015. ISBN 978-4-19-950465-5. and Okayado (February 2016). Monster Musume, Vol. 8. National Geographic Books. ISBN 978-1-626922-13-6.
- Vol. 9 (ch. 35–38): オカヤド (February 2016). モンスター娘のいる日常 9 (in Japanese). 徳間書店. ISBN 978-4-19-950492-1. and Okayado (August 2016). Monster Musume, Vol. 9. National Geographic Books. ISBN 978-1-626922-78-5.
- Vol. 10 (ch. 39–42): オカヤド (July 2016). モンスター娘のいる日常 10 (in Japanese). 徳間書店. ISBN 978-4-19-950513-3. and Okayado (December 2016). Monster Musume, Vol. 10. National Geographic Books. ISBN 978-1-626924-39-0.
- Vol. 11 (ch. 43–46): オカヤド (September 2016). モンスター娘のいる日常 11 (in Japanese). 徳間書店. ISBN 978-4-19-950535-5. and Okayado (April 2017). Monster Musume, Vol. 11. National Geographic Books. ISBN 978-1-626924-66-6.
- Vol. 11 (ch. 47–50): オカヤド (April 2017). モンスター娘のいる日常 12 (in Japanese). 徳間書店. ISBN 978-4-19 9505-60-7. and Okayado (August 2017). Monster Musume, Vol. 12. National Geographic Books. ISBN 978-1-626925-17-5.
- Vol. 11 (ch. 51–54): オカヤド (October 2017). モンスター娘のいる日常 13 (in Japanese). 徳間書店. ISBN 978-4-19-950590-4. and Monster Musume, Vol. 13. March 2018. ISBN 978-1-626927-04-9.
- Vol. Uncollected chapters (ch. 55–):
