= Artland (company) =

Japanese animation studio

Artland Inc.
- Native name: 株式会社アートランド
- Romanized name: Kabushiki-gaisha Ātorando
- Type: Kabushiki-gaisha
- Industry: Animation
- Founded: September 14, 1978
- Founder: Noboru Ishiguro
- Defunct: 2015
- Fate: Absorbed into Marvelous Entertainment
- Headquarters: Musashino, Tokyo, Japan
- Key people: Hidenobu Watanabe (Representative Director and President)
- Products: Anime
- Services: Animation production
- Number of employees: 11 (as of March 2016)
- Parent: Marvelous

Animation Studio Artland Inc.
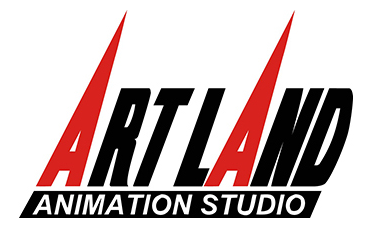
- Native name: 株式会社アニメーションスタジオ・アートランド
- Romanized name: Kabushiki-gaisha Animēshon Sutajio Ātorando
- Type: Kabushiki-gaisha
- Industry: Animation
- Founded: December 1, 2010
- Defunct: 2017
- Headquarters: Musashino, Tokyo, Japan
- Key people: Kuniharu Okano (President)
- Products: Anime
- Services: Animation production
- Owner: Kuniharu Okano
- Number of employees: 11 (as of March 2016)
- Website: www.artland.co.jp

Artland Inc. (Japanese: 株式会社アートランド, Hepburn: Kabushiki-gaisha Ātorando) was a Japanese animation studio. It has produced numerous noted anime series, including the award-winning Mushishi and epic Legend of the Galactic Heroes. It is also well known for producing the anime adaptation of Katekyō Hitman Reborn!.

== History ==
On March 17, 2006, Marvelous Entertainment announced that Artland would become a subsidiary of Marvelous Entertainment Inc., effective on April 3, 2006. Subsequently, Artland became a kabushiki-gaisha.

On November 15, 2010, Marvelous Entertainment Inc. announced the split of Artland Inc.'s animation department into Animation Studio Artland Inc., effective on 2010-12-01. All shares of the new company then were transferred to Kuniharu Okano.

In December 2010, Animation Studio Artland Inc. (Japanese: 株式会社アニメーションスタジオ・アートランド, Hepburn: Kabushiki-gaisha Animēshon Sutajio Ātorando) was established and Artland Inc.'s animation production business was transferred to the new company.

In 2015, Emon, the Japanese branch of Haoliners Animation League, bought a 51% stake in the company, with Artland's president Kuniharu Okano owning the other 49%, in order to strengthen business and animation production relations between the two companies.

In July 2017, however, it was reported that the company was closing down due to financial debt. Kuniharu Okano later stated that "the company was seeking restructuring help" rather than shutting down, but in August of the same year Emon reported having transferred its stakes to Tokyo-based company LEVELS, citing difficulties with restructuring an overseas animation studio. The debt incurred by Artland is reported to have been from outsourcing, which was said to have "comprised almost 90% of its production costs." Following the failed restructuring and the transfer of shares to LEVELS in late 2017, the studio effectively ceased all animation operations and vacated its production space.

== Works ==
=== Television series ===
- Yūgo (2003, episodes 7–13)
- Gag Manga Biyori (2005)
- Mushishi (2005–2006)
- We Were There (2006)
- Gag Manga Biyori 2 (2006)
- Happiness! (2006–2007)
- Katekyō Hitman Reborn! (2006–2010)
- Kono Aozora ni Yakusoku wo ~Yōkoso Tsugumi Ryōhe~ (2007)
- Kenkō Zenrakei Suieibu Umishō (2007)
- Gunslinger Girl: Il Teatrino (2008)
- Hakushaku to Yōsei (2008)
- Tytania (2008–2009)
- Demon King Daimao (2010)
- Tantei Opera Milky Holmes 2 (2012, with J.C.Staff)
- Tantei Opera Milky Holmes Alternative (2012-2013, with J.C. Staff)
- Senran Kagura (2013)
- Mushishi ~Next Passage~ (2014)
- Komori-san Can't Decline (2015)
- Seven Mortal Sins (2017, with TNK)

=== OVA/ONA/Specials ===
- Legend of the Galactic Heroes (1988–1997, 30 episodes)
- Star Cat Fullhouse (1989)
- Blue Flames (1989)
- Koiko's Daily Life (1989)
- Meisō-Ō Border (1991)
- Bubblegum Crash (1991, with Artmic)
- Genocyber (1994, with Artmic)
- Gall Force: The Revolution (1996–1997)
- Legend of the Galactic Heroes: A Hundred Billion Stars, A Hundred Billion Lights (1998, episodes 9–12, 16, and 21–23)
- Legend of the Galactic Heroes: Spiral Labyrinth (2000, episodes 15, 18, and 24–26)
- Gunslinger Girl -Il Teatrino- (2008)
- Mushishi: The Shadow That Devours the Sun (2014)
- Mushishi: Path of Thorns (2014)

=== Animated films ===
- Macross: Do You Remember Love? (1984, with Studio Nue and Tatsunoko)
- Megazone 23 Part I (1985, with Artmic)
- Megazone 23 Part II (1986, with Artmic)
- Legend of the Galactic Heroes: My Conquest is the Sea of Stars (1988, with Madhouse)
- Mushishi: Bell Droplets (2015)
