= Manga Time Original =

Japanese manga magazine

- Categories: Seinen manga
- Frequency: Monthly
- First issue: July 1982
- Company: Houbunsha
- Country: Japan
- Based in: Tokyo
- Language: Japanese
- Website: mangatime-square.com

Manga Time Original (まんがタイムオリジナル, Manga Taimu Orijinaru) is a Japanese monthly yonkoma seinen manga magazine published by Houbunsha since July 1982. The magazine celebrated its 30th anniversary in 2012.

== Serialized titles ==
- Komori-san wa Kotowarenai!
