= 12 Beast =

Japanese manga series

- Cover of the first Japanese volume

トゥエルヴビースト (Tueruvu Bīsuto)
- Genre: Comedy, fantasy
- Manga
- Written by: Okayado
- Published by: Fujimi Shobo
- English publisher: US: Seven Seas Entertainment
- Imprint: Dragon Comics Age
- Magazine: Age Premium (2014–2015); Monthly Dragon Age (2015–2020)
- Original run: November 9, 2013 – September 6, 2020
- Volumes: 7

12 Beast (Japanese: トゥエルヴビースト, Hepburn: Tueruvu Bīsuto) is a Japanese shōnen manga series written and illustrated by Okayado. (Note: Okayado is the pen name of Takemaru Inui.) The series is published by Fujimi Shobo in Japan, and by Seven Seas Entertainment in the United States.

On September 6, 2020, Okayado announced the manga has been canceled due to multiple reasons.

== Summary ==
Touga Eita is a high school student and video-game otaku. He is the heir to the Touga style Ninjitsu, and he has never kissed a girl. All this changes when a voluptuous girl with wings and taloned feet named Aero appears and calls on Eita to help save her people-the harpies of Re-Verse-from the merciless onslaught of giant robot monsters known as Gigas. Aero reveals that she was sent to find him, by his missing brother. Eita will follow his newfound harpy friend into a whole new world, filled with monster girls and fantastical creatures beyond his wildest dreams.

== Characters ==
- Eita Touga (刀(とう)牙(が)衛(えい)太(た), Tōga Eita): A teenage boy who just wants to be left alone to play video games. His grandfather is a ninja, who wants him to inherit the dojo (despite his refusal to do so), and trains him every day. Touga suffers from a severe inferiority complex, due to his elder brother seducing every woman he comes into contact with. After being summoned to Re-verse, he obtains a gauntlet from Asterio that has the power of fusing with any of his companions, to increase his powers.
- Aero (エアロ, Earo): A female Harpy who asks Eita to help her save her world, taking him to Re-verse and becoming his first traveling companion. She is the first to fuse with his gauntlet, providing him with extreme speed and strength.
- Jawea (ジャウェア, Jawea): A female Harpy war leader who has her doubts about Eita, but joins him nonetheless as his second traveling companion, and eventually comes to trust him. During the battle for the fish-people's village, she loses her right wing and decides to leave Eita's party. Before leaving she exchanges email addresses with Eita.
- Asterio (アステリオ, Asuterio): A female Minotaur and master blacksmith who forges a new gauntlet for Eita and later joins him as his third traveling companion. When she fuses with his gauntlet, she grants him the ability of metal remolding.
- Steela (スティーラ, Sutīra), also known as The "Witch of the Deep" (深海の魔女, Shinkai no Majo): A Cecaelian sea witch, with the lower half of an octopus. She joins them and provides them with transportation via a huge hermit crab, whose shell functions as her house. She sleeps in a jar naked.
- Freki (フレキ, Furēki): A member of the werewolf clan, and the fifth addition to Eita's gang. Freki is the werewolf clan's strongest lone wolf, due to the fact that she hunts alone, resulting in her feared reputation; this is actually a façade, and she is really just very shy. She attempts to start a conversation with Eita when trapped in a cave, but only distances herself. They later escape with the golem. When Freki combines with Eita's gauntlet, it allows Eita to control and utilize smoke.
- Theta: A golem that Eita and Freki find inside the cave they are trapped in. It is revealed that she made the cave after her mechanized suit was damaged. She asks the pair to help her repair it by giving her materials that can be absorbed by the suit. She joins Eita and Freki after they are rescued. Soon after, she sheds her mechanized suit and reveals her true form, a small girl with large metallic hands, before proceeding to help Eita take on the Divine General Vajra and its pilot, Hunter.
- Kouki Touga: Eita's elder brother, his endless womanizing is what ends up turning Eita into a recluse. Not wanting to inherit his grandfather's dojo, he left a year before the story begins on a "worldwide-girl experiencing trip". It is revealed that he actually came to Re-verse, but his current location is unknown.

== Release ==
Okayado launched the series in the June 2013 issue of Fujimi Shobo's shōnen manga magazine on May 9, 2013. When Age Premium was shut down on July 9, 2015, the series was one of five titles transferred to Monthly Dragon Age. The chapters have been compiled into seven tankōbon volumes before being cancelled.

North American publisher Seven Seas Entertainment announced their license to the series on July 30, 2014.

=== Volumes ===
No.	Original release date	Original ISBN	English release date	English ISBN
1	November 9, 2013	978-4-04-712932-0	April 14, 2015	978-1-626921-77-1
2	September 9, 2014	978-4-04-070173-8	July 7, 2015	978-1-626921-78-8
3	August 8, 2015	978-4-04-070664-1	February 9, 2016	978-1-626922-61-7
4	June 9, 2016	978-4-04-070918-5	December 13, 2016	978-1-626923-12-6
5	April 8, 2017	978-4-04-072243-6	September 26, 2017	978-1-626924-45-1
6	April 9, 2018	978-4-04-072666-3	June 26, 2018	978-1-626928-00-8
7	June 8, 2019	978-4-04-073210-7	April 7, 2020	978-1-642750-10-2

== Reception ==
On Anime News Network, Rebecca Silverman gave volume one an overall grade of C, calling the story generic and textbook. She found the art to be interesting and that the characters distinctive, comparing the series to Okayado's Monster Musume characters. Also on Anime News Network, Lynzee Loveridge listed the series at number four on a list of "7 Manga for Monster Girl Lovers".

Two volumes of the English translation have made it onto the New York Times Manga Best Sellers list:

- Volume 2 stayed for one week, debuting at number 3.
- Volume 3 stayed for two weeks, debuting at number 3.

== See also ==
- Monster Musume, another manga series by the same author
