= Mayuka Nomura =

Japanese voice actress

Mayuka Nomura (野村真悠華, Nomura Mayuka; born January 11, 1989 in Tokyo) is a Japanese voice actress affiliated with VIMS. She is best known for voicing Suu in Monster Musume and Konomi in Paradise of Innocence.

== Filmography ==
=== Anime series ===
2012

- Aikatsu!

2013

- Nyaruko: Crawling with Love as Waitress (ep 4)

2014

- Bladedance of Elementalers as Student (ep 3)

2015

- Monster Musume as Suu

=== OVA ===
2013

- Rescue Me! as Sayaka Shimizu

2014

- Paradise of Innocence as Konomi

=== Video games ===
2011

- Gal*Gun

2012

- Uta no?Prince-sama? Debut

2013

- Xblaze Code: Embryo as Es

2015

- Xblaze Lost: Memories as Es

2016

- BlazBlue: Central Fiction as Es

2018

- BlazBlue: Cross Tag Battle as Es
