= I Can't Understand What My Husband Is Saying =

Japanese manga and anime series

- Cover of Danna ga Nani o Itteiru ka Wakaranai Ken volume 1 by Ichijinsha

旦那が何を言っているかわからない件 (Danna ga Nani o Itteiru ka Wakaranai Ken)
- Genre: Comedy, slice of life
- Manga
- Written by: Coolkyousinnjya
- Published by: Ichijinsha
- Original run: 2011 – 2014
- Volumes: 5
- Anime television series
- Directed by: Shinpei Nagai
- Produced by: Dream Creation
- Written by: Shinpei Nagai
- Music by: G-angle
- Studio: Seven
- Licensed by: NA: Crunchyroll
- Original network: TV Saitama
- Original run: October 3, 2014 – June 25, 2015
- Episodes: 26

I Can't Understand What My Husband Is Saying (旦那が何を言っているかわからない件, Danna ga Nani o Itteiru ka Wakaranai Ken) is a Japanese 4-panel manga series by Coolkyousinnjya. The chapters are released online and then published in print by Ichijinsha. The first volume was released on December 29, 2011, and the fifth volume was released on August 4, 2015. An anime adaptation began airing in Japan on October 4, 2014, and finished airing on December 25, 2014. A second season began airing on April 2, 2015, and finished airing on June 25, 2015.

== Plot ==
The series centers around the daily lives of Kaoru, a hard working office lady, and her husband Hajime, who is an otaku, an obsessed fan of anime and manga culture, and who works as a blogger. Using popular anime and otaku tropes and in-jokes, the characters explore the conflicts and similarities between daily life and otaku culture in urban Japan. The witty dialogue accentuates the animation and sometimes slips into manzai-style humor.

== Characters ==
Kaoru (カオル)
Voiced by: Yukari Tamura
A 25-year-old office lady who is adjusting to married life with Hajime who is an otaku. She becomes pregnant near the end of the series.
Hajime (ハジメ)
Voiced by: Kenichi Suzumura
Kaoru's 23-year-old otaku husband (旦那, Danna) who initially scrapes by living as a blogger who reviews various forms of nerd media from video games to anime. He eventually starts working as a web designer.
Mayotama (マヨタマ)
Voiced by: Sayaka Horino
Hajime's cross-dressing younger brother. A popular Boys Love manga artist with a slightly perverted sense of humor.
Miki (三木)
Voiced by: Kaori Shimizu
A manga enthusiast and director at a data entry company.
Rino Juse (樹瀬 リノ, Juse Rino)
Voiced by: Rie Kugimiya
Kaoru's close friend since high school who's now married to Nozomu Juse.
Nozomu Juse (樹瀬 のぞむ, Juse Nozomu)
Voiced by: Toshifumi Sakai
Mature and good looking. Tends to forget that Rino is older than him and always treat Rino carefully.
Tadashi (忠)
Voiced by: Kazuma Horie
Kaoru's father. He is very protective of Kaoru and is a highly skilled chef.
Tanaka-san (田中さん)
Voiced by: Ryōko Shintani
Kaoru's other close friend since high school who's now married to Yamada-san.

== Media ==
=== Anime ===
An anime television series adaptation began airing in October 2014. Crunchyroll began streaming the series on October 4, 2014. The episodes are approximately three minutes long. The thirteenth episode announced that the series had been green-lit for a second season, which premiered in April 2015.

==== Episode list ====
===== Season 1 =====
No.	Title	Original release date
1	"How I Got Into Hobbies I Don't Understand"; Transliteration: "Awanai shumi to hamatta Sori" (Japanese: 合わない趣味とハマったソリ)	October 4, 2014
Kaoru reflects on her first few weeks of marriage with Hajime, including their honeymoon. Hajime is an otaku; he watches much anime and is into moe characters as well as boobs. They go out to see an anime film, but Hajime only thinks of critiquing it.
2	"Surpass Gender and Blood. Come Forth, Otokonoko..."; Transliteration: "Seibetsu o Koe Chi o Koe dede yo Otokonoko" (Japanese: 性別を超え血を超え出でよ男の娘)	October 11, 2014
Hajime's brother Mayotama comes to visit, but Mayotama dresses like a little sister and is into boys love manga. Hajime breaks it to him that Kaoru is not an otaku. Mayotama attempts to see Hajime's body while he is in the bathtub. Later, Kaoru's friends come over to meet her new husband.
3	"My Otaku Brother Can't Have So Few Friends (Etc.)"; Transliteration: "Otaku no Ore no Otōto ga Konnani Tomodachi ga Sukunai Wake ga (ry" (Japanese: オタクの俺の弟がこんなに友達が少ない訳が(ry)	October 18, 2014
Hajime and Mayotama attend an offline club meeting for otakus, and end up meeting Hajime's acquaintance; Miki, who falls for Mayotama. Unfortunately, he is unaware that Mayotama is a boy with a tendency to cross-dress.
4	"My Husband Primarily Works in the Year-Round Home Surveillance Business"; Transliteration: "Danna wa Tamani Keibi-shoku ni Nenjūmukyū de Tsuiteorimasu" (Japanese: 旦那はたまに警備職に年中無休で就いております)	October 22, 2014
Hajime suspends his blog and tries to find real employment in the workforce. In the end, he is hired as a net-designer for the business that Miki runs.
5	"Drunker Devil"; Transliteration: "Dorankā Debiru" (Japanese: ドランカーデビル)	October 29, 2014
It is revealed that Kaoru gets very wild and out of control when she gets drunk.
6	"Never Cross a Bridge Till You Come To It"; Transliteration: "Nebā Kurosu A Burijji Tiru Yū Kamu Tu Itto" (Japanese: ネバークロスアブリッジティルユーカムトゥイット)	November 6, 2014
Kaoru tries to fight a smoking addiction due to a hinted pregnancy.
7	"What Happened When I Turned My Back to the Path I Was Used To and Started Running"; Transliteration: "Arukinareta Michi ni Se o Mukete Hashittemita Kekka" (Japanese: 歩きなれた道に背を向けて走ってみた結果)	November 13, 2014
Kaoru decides she wants to learn how to cook. The couple consults her father, a professional chef.
8	"I'll Become a Pro Golfer"; Transliteration: "Puro Gorufā naru" (Japanese: プロゴルファーなる)	November 20, 2014
Kaoru's relatives need someone to watch their young daughter, Ai-chan, while they are at a pro golfing match. The couple obliges.
9	"Slathering Honey on the Best Pancakes Ever"; Transliteration: "Gokujō no pankēki ni hachimitsu o buchimakeru kōi" (Japanese: 極上のパンケーキにハチミツをぶちまける行為)	November 27, 2014
To help Mayotama with his manga writing, Kaoru and Hajime describe how they met, as well as their first date.
10	"The Child Who Is So Close Yet So Far Away"; Transliteration: "Kiwamete chikaku, kagirinaku tōi kodomo" (Japanese: 極めて近く、限りなく遠い子供)	December 4, 2014
After an unexpected visit from Hajime's mother, the couple considers and discusses having a child.
11	"One Person Had Survived On Her Own"; Transliteration: "Hito ga hitori de ikite kite" (Japanese: 人が一人で生きてきて)	December 11, 2014
Kaoru reflects on her former living circumstances, before coming to the simple revelation that she is blessed to be married.
12	"Fusion Sage Day"; Transliteration: "Yūgōkenja no hi" (Japanese: 融合賢者の日)	December 18, 2014
After learning Kaoru has to work on Christmas Day, Hajime decides to go to Rino and Nozomu's house to avoid being alone on the 25th.
13	"Me, Her, and Another"; Transliteration: "Boku to Kanojo to Mōhitori" (Japanese: 僕と彼女ともう一人)	December 25, 2014
After making subtle in-anime jests at the series' imminent conclusion, Hajime and Kaoru learn that the latter is pregnant.

===== Season 2 =====
No.	Title	Original release date
1	"Wriggling Memories"; Transliteration: "Omoide Ugougo" (Japanese: 思い出うごうご)	April 2, 2015
Kaoru takes Hajime with her on a trip down memory lane.
2	"Snipe Better"; Transliteration: "Sunaipu betā" (Japanese: スナイプベター)	April 9, 2015
Kaoru's insecurities about her marriage are raised by compatibility tests.
3	"Husband and Wife's XXX"; Transliteration: "Tsuma to Otto no Batsubatsubatsu" (Japanese: 妻と夫の×××)	April 16, 2015
In an attempt to curb his voluptuous collection of anime figurines, Hajime strikes up an interest in bowling.
4	"I Only Draw Free"; Transliteration: "Ore wa Furī de shika egakanai" (Japanese: 俺はフリーでしか描かない)	April 23, 2015
Mayotama gets an assistance job through Kaoru.
5	"Take me to the Ryokan"; Transliteration: "Watashi wo Ryokan ni tsurete tte" (Japanese: 私を旅館につれてって)	April 30, 2015
Miki brings everyone along on a trip to a hot spring.
6	"Sabinuki Girlfriend"; Transliteration: "Sabinuki Kanojo" (Japanese: さび抜きカノジョ)	May 7, 2015
Nozomu tells Hajime about how he met Rino. The episode is adapted from a spin-off of the same name.
7	"Kaoru and Her Husband"; Transliteration: "Kaoru to Dan'na" (Japanese: カオルと旦那)	May 14, 2015
Hajime goes to a manga convention, where he discusses his marriage to Kaoru with Miki-san.
8	"Mayotama's Explosive Appearance"; Transliteration: "Nayotama Bakutan" (Japanese: マヨタマ爆誕)	May 21, 2015
A look into Hajime's and Mayotama's past.
9	"Made a Wish, It got True, and I got in Trouble"; Transliteration: "Nozonde kanatte okorerete" (Japanese: 望んで叶って怒られて)	May 28, 2015
Kaoru and Hajime visit Hajime's parents, who chastise him for not getting a job.
10	"Fool Couple"; Transliteration: "Fūru Fūfu" (Japanese: フールフーフ)	June 4, 2015
After hearing about a cheating husband, Kaoru remembers competing with a colleague for Hajime's affection.
11	"The Weight of Value, and the Value of Weight"; Transliteration: "Kachi no Omosa to Omosa no Kachi" (Japanese: 価値の重さと重さの価値)	June 11, 2015
Continues from where season 1 had ended.
12	"Baby Skip Beat"; Transliteration: "Beibī sukippu bīto" (Japanese: ベイビースキップビート)	June 18, 2015
Kaoru and Hajime consider how the baby will affect their futures.
13	"Happy Days"	June 25, 2015
Everyone gathers to think of a name for Kaoru's and Hajime's child.
