= Komori-san Can't Decline =

Japanese manga and anime series

- Cover of Komori-san wa Kotowarenai! of the first volume featuring Shuri Komori

小森さんは断れない! (Komori-san wa Kotowarenai!)
- Genre: Comedy, slice of life
- Manga
- Written by: Coolkyousinnjya
- Published by: Houbunsha
- Magazine: Manga Time Original
- Original run: April 2012 – March 27, 2025
- Volumes: 13
- Anime television series
- Directed by: Kenichi Imaizumi
- Written by: Yuka Suguro
- Music by: Arte Refact
- Studio: Artland
- Licensed by: NA: Crunchyroll
- Original network: Tokyo MX, Sun TV
- Original run: October 4, 2015 – December 20, 2015
- Episodes: 12
- icon

Komori-san Can't Decline (小森さんは断れない!, Komori-san wa Kotowarenai!) is a Japanese four-panel manga series written and illustrated by Coolkyousinnjya. It was serialized in Houbunsha's Manga Time Original magazine from April 2012 to March 2025. An anime television series adaptation by Artland aired from October to December 2015.

== Plot ==
Shuri Komori, a kindhearted junior high school girl, is incapable of turning down requests from others. Her constant willingness to help, whether running errands or performing physical tasks, results in her developing unexpectedly incredible strength and abilities. Despite these exaggerated traits, the series focuses on everyday school life, following Shuri as she balances her unusual circumstances with the ordinary experiences of adolescence. Her friends, the level-headed Masako Negishi and energetic Megumi Nishitori, frequently worry about her workload and attempt to rein in her self-sacrificing tendencies.

== Characters ==
Shuri Komori (小森 しゅり, Komori Shuri)
Voiced by: Aya Uchida
A fifteen-year-old girl who, for some reason, cannot turn down any request given to her. Her best friends are Megumi and Masako. It has been hinted that she may have a small crush on Kuro.
Megumi Nishitori (西鳥 めぐみ, Nishitori Megumi)
Voiced by: Ari Ozawa
Shuri's friend since elementary school, who is often lazy and overly-reliant on her.
Masako Negishi (根岸 まさ子, Negishi Masako)
Voiced by: Maria Naganawa
Shuri's friend since middle school, who is somewhat cynical.
Kuro Otani (大谷 九郎, Ōtani Kurō)
Voiced by: Reina Takeshita
A teen boy who becomes Shuri's classmate in the third year. He wants to be relied on but is often ignored.

== Media ==
=== Manga ===
The manga, written and illustrated by Coolkyousinnjya, began serialization in Houbunsha's Manga Time Original in April 2012. It ended serialization on March 27, 2025. Thirteen tankōbon volumes have been released as of June 2025.

No.	Japanese release date	Japanese ISBN
1	July 4, 2013	978-4-8322-5205-9
2	January 7, 2014	978-4-8322-5259-2
3	October 7, 2014	978-4-8322-5326-1
4	October 7, 2015	978-4-8322-5423-7
5	February 7, 2017	978-4-8322-5558-6
6	February 7, 2018	978-4-8322-5663-7
7	November 7, 2018	978-4-8322-5728-3
8	February 6, 2020	978-4-8322-5779-5
9	February 5, 2021	978-4-8322-5818-1
10	March 7, 2022	978-4-8322-5859-4
11	May 6, 2023	978-4-8322-5900-3
12	May 7, 2024	978-4-8322-5939-3
13	June 6, 2025	978-4-8322-5979-9

=== Anime ===
An anime television adaptation by Artland aired from October to December 2015. The series was directed by Kenichi Imaizumi and written by Yuka Suguro, with character design by Yurie Kuniyuki and music by Arte Refact. The opening theme is "Toaru Itsumo o" (とあるいつもを, A Certain Usual Thing) by Yuuhei Satellite. The anime is streamed worldwide by Crunchyroll.

==== Episode list ====
No.	Title	Original release date
1	"Komori-san Gets Requests?"; Transliteration: "Komori-san wa Tanoma Remasu ka?" (Japanese: 小森さんは頼まれますか？)	October 4, 2015
2	"Komori-san is Strong!"; Transliteration: "Komori-san wa Chikaramochi!" (Japanese: 小森さんは力持ち！)	October 11, 2015
3	"Komori-san is Popular!"; Transliteration: "Komori-san wa ninki-sha!" (Japanese: 小森さんは人気者！)	October 18, 2015
4	"Komori-san Can You Everything?"; Transliteration: "Komori-san wa nandemoya?" (Japanese: 小森さんは何でも屋？)	October 25, 2015
5	"Negishi-san Has It All Covered!"; Transliteration: "Negishi-san wa sotsu ga nai!" (Japanese: 根岸さんはソツがない！)	November 1, 2015
6	"Ootani-kun Wants to be Relied On!"; Transliteration: "Ōtani-kun wa tayora retai!" (Japanese: 大谷くんは頼られたい！)	November 8, 2015
7	"The Pool Gets Exciting!"; Transliteration: "Pūru wa dokidoki!" (Japanese: プールはドキドキ！)	November 15, 2015
8	"Summer is for Having Fun!"; Transliteration: "Natsu wa yappari asobitai!" (Japanese: 夏はやっぱり遊びたい！)	November 22, 2015
9	"Festivals are Bittersweet!"; Transliteration: "Omatsuri wa amazuppai!" (Japanese: お祭りは甘酸っぱい！)	November 29, 2015
10	"Pathway Counselling Makes Me Uneasy!"; Transliteration: "Shinro chōsa wa nayamashī!" (Japanese: 進路調査は悩ましい！)	December 6, 2015
11	"It's Easy to Catch Cold This Time of Year..."; Transliteration: "Kono kisetsu wa kaze o hiki yasui!" (Japanese: この季節は風邪をひきやすい！)	December 13, 2015
12	"Komori-san Isn't Asked to Do Anything?"; Transliteration: "Komori-san wa tanoma renai?" (Japanese: 小森さんは頼まれない？)	December 20, 2015
