= Coolkyousinnjya =

Japanese manga artist

- クール教信者
- Born: 23 June
- Occupation: Manga artist
- Writing career
- Notable works: Miss Kobayashi's Dragon Maid; I Can't Understand What My Husband Is Saying; Komori-san Can't Decline
- Website: www.i-love-cool.com

Coolkyousinnjya (クール教信者, Kūrukyōshinja) is a Japanese manga artist known for the series Miss Kobayashi's Dragon Maid, I Can't Understand What My Husband Is Saying, and Komori-san Can't Decline.

== Career ==
In 2011, Coolkyousinnjya published the first volume of I Can't Understand What My Husband Is Saying. An anime adaptation aired from October to December 2014, with a second season airing from April to June 2015.

In April 2012, Coolkyousinnjya released the first chapter of Komori-san Can't Decline. An anime adaptation aired from October to December 2015.

On 10 May 2013, the first Miss Kobayashi's Dragon Maid chapter was published in Japanese, and the first English volume was published on 18 October 2016. Miss Kobayashi's Dragon Maid also has five spin-off series, including Miss Kobayashi's Dragon Maid: Kanna's Daily Life and Miss Kobayashi's Dragon Maid: Elma's Office Lady Diary. Miss Kobayashi's Dragon Maid has over 1.2 million copies in print worldwide as of February 2018. It received an anime adaptation in early 2017, with a second season airing in 2021. In addition, a feature film based on the series was released in June of 2025, titled Miss Kobayashi's Dragon Maid: A Lonely Dragon Wants to Be Loved.

Coolkyousinnjya was also writing Peach Boy Riverside and illustrating The Idaten Deities Know Only Peace, which both had anime adaptations premiere in July 2021.
