= Asato =

Asato may refer to:

== People with the given name ==
=== Given name ===
- Asato Asato (安里 アサト, born 1985), Japanese novelist
- Asato Miyagawa (宮川 麻都, born 1998), Japanese women's footballer
- Asato Kido (城戸 亜沙斗), fictional character in the series YuYu Hakusho

=== Surname ===
- Ankō Asato (安里 安恒, 1827–1906), Ryukyuan karateka
- Mari Asato (安里 麻里), Japanese film director
- Mateus Asato, is a guitarist
- Olga Asato, Peruvian volleyball player
- Jessica Asato, British politician
- Jim Asato, American football coach
- Yūya Asato (安里 勇哉), Japanese voice actor

== Places ==
- Asatō Line, a Japanese railway line
- Asato Station, a railway station in Naha, Okinawa Prefecture, Japan
- Asato, a town in the Volta Region, Ghana
