= Shirow Shiratori =

Japanese writer

- 白鳥士郎
- Born: 1981 (age 44–45); Tajimi, Gifu Prefecture, Japan
- Education: Meijo University
- Occupation: Novelist
- Spouse: 2017 -
- Children: 1
- Writing career
- Language: Japanese
- Period: 2008 -
- Genre: Light novel
- Notable works: No-Rin; The Ryuo's Work Is Never Done!

Shirow Shiratori (白鳥士郎 Shiratori Shirō, born 1981 is a Japanese light novelist. He is most known for his series No-Rin and The Ryuo's Work Is Never Done!. He is from Tajimi, Gifu Prefecture.

== Career ==
After graduating from Tajimi Kita Senior High School, he attended and graduated from Kanazawa University from the faculty of law. Then, he attended Meijo University graduate school of law and completed his course. During the second year of university, Shiratori started writing novels.

In April 2008, he debuted with Rajikaru Erementsu (らじかるエレメンツ), published by SB Creative publishing label GA Bunko. The series spanned three volumes and concluded in January 2009.

From August 2009 to March 2010, Shiratori wrote and published Sōkai Gāruzu (蒼海ガールズ!), which also spanned three volumes and was published by GA Bunko.

In July 2011, he published the first volume of his first breakout work No-Rin (のうりん), which won him the newly established Ranobezuki Shotenin Taishō award in 2012. This series spanned 13 volumes lasting from 2011 to October 2016 where it has remained in an indefinite hiatus. It got a twelve-episode anime adaptation in 2014.

His most popular work, The Ryuo's Work Is Never Done! (りゅうおうのおしごと!) started publishing in September 2015. This series won Shiratori the 28th Shōgi Pen Club Taishō Literary Club's Award of Excellence in July 2016. The Ryuo's Work Is Never Done! received a 12-episode anime adaptation in January 2018. Due to the success of Ryuo!, he occasionally commentates on prominent shōgi matches. His journalism of the seventh and decisive game of the 3rd Eiō Shōgi competition featuring Kōta Kanai versus Taichi Takami in April 2018, featured on Niconico News, won him the grand prize in the 31st Shōgi Pen Club Taishō Kanseki Division awards.

== Personal life ==
Shiratori lived in his hometown of Tajimi until he moved to Nagoya in 2018 where he lives today.

Originally, Shiratori's reason for starting to write novels was to "earn money." With the substantial tuition expenses and having to care for family at home, he had to find a job that allowed him to work remotely and so, he decided on becoming a light novel author. For that reason, Shiratori wrote what he believed readers would enjoy reading, and has stated that Ryuo! was the first series he wrote purely for his own enjoyment.

Before his career as a writer, Shiratori aimed to work in the field of law, however after spending 12 years in university, he failed the exam so he started working for his mentor's law firm while writing on the side.

Initially, Shiratori was ashamed of being a light novel writer, so for a short while after his debut, he changed his name, hometown and birthday to avoid being found out. His old profile stated that he was born in 1977, that he was from Kanazawa, Ishikawa Prefecture, and that after graduating from university, he worked in a company that manufactured coin-operated parking space bumpers. When the third volume of No-Rin was published, a picture of Shiratori appeared in a newspaper which revealed his work to his family and friends, so he rectified his author profile. He also said that after the death of his grandfather and mother in 2015 and 2016 respectively, knowing that both of them took pride in their work, changed his attitude and that lying about who he was "would mean even denying the lives of his mother and grandfather who raised him." His mother's death was a particular shock to him, once writing that even after winning an award for Ryuo!, and after learning that his series would be adapted as an anime, when he should be thinking that he had everything he wanted, he believed that in reality he "had nothing."

Shiratori cites light novelist Kei Satō as his role model.

He is a FC Gifu fan, sometimes posting about matches on his official blog or Twitter, and sometimes appears wearing a replica uniform not only at matches but also at events and interviews. In 2018, FC Gifu released a keychain in collaboration with Shiratori which depicted the author dressed in his signature Ryūō (promoted rook, lit. Dragon King) shōgi piece costume, which sold out. In 2019, the collaboration released newly designed keychains and towels.

In March 2018, Shiratori announced in the afterword for the eighth volume of Ryuo! that he was marrying a bookstore employee seven years his junior (in reality, they had been on the family registry since 2017). After the anime adaptation of Ryuo! had finished, on 12 May 2018 they officially held their marriage ceremony.

On 11 February 2019, he announced his wife had given birth to a baby girl.

== Bibliography ==
- Rajikaru Erementsu (らじかるエレメンツ) (Illustrated by Katōharuaki, published by GA Bunko, 3 volumes)
- Soukai Gāruzu! (蒼海ガールズ!) (Illustrated by Yasuyuki, published by GA Bunko, 3 volumes)
- No-Rin (のうりん) (Illustrated by Kippu, published by GA Bunko, 13 volumes (on hiatus))
- The Ryuo's Work Is Never Done! (りゅうおうのおしごと!) (Illustrated by Shirabii, published by GA Bunko, 16 volumes)
