= Sherlock Academy =

Japanese light novel series

- First light novel volume cover

シャーロック+アカデミー (Shārokku Akademī)
- Genre: Fantasy, mystery
- Light novel
- Written by: Kyōsuke Kamishiro
- Illustrated by: Shirabii
- Published by: Media Factory
- Imprint: MF Bunko J
- Original run: June 23, 2023 – present
- Volumes: 5
- Manga
- Written by: Kyōsuke Kamishiro
- Illustrated by: Amechaya
- Published by: Bungeishunjū
- Magazine: Buncomi
- Original run: February 24, 2026 – present
- Volumes: 1

Sherlock Academy (シャーロック+アカデミー, Shārokku Akademī) is a Japanese light novel series written by Kyōsuke Kamishiro and illustrated by Shirabii. It began publication under Media Factory's MF Bunko J imprint in June 2023; five volumes have been released as of June 2026. A manga adaptation illustrated by Amechaya began serialization on Bungeishunjū's Buncomi manga service in February 2026, and has been compiled into a single volume as of June 2026.

== Plot ==
The series follows Misaki Fumisaki and Shia E. Hazeldine, two new students at a school for budding detectives. Japan is currently facing a crime wave, increasing the demand for detectives. The two immediately become involved when they realize that they related to people who were once-bitter enemies: Misaki's grandfather was a notorious crime boss, while Shia is the adopted daughter of a noted detective. The two form a rivalry as they solve cases.

== Characters ==
Misaki Fumisaki (不実崎 未咲, Fumisaki Misaki)
The grandson of a notorious crime lord, who enrolls at a school for detectives. He initially finds it annoying that people at school care so much about investigations. He develops a rivalry with Shia.
Shia E. Hazeldine (詩亜・E・ヘーゼルダイン, Shia E. Hēzerudain)
The adopted daughter of a famous detective. She has had an interest in investigations since childhood and is skilled at it.
Hōka Ushinai (宇志内 蜂花, Ushinai Hōka)
Koyomi Matsuridate (祭舘 こよみ, Matsuridate Koyomi)
Fiona Banjō (万条 吹尾奈, Banjō Fiona)

== Development ==
Kamishiro began writing Sherlock Academy following the success of his previous light novel series My Stepmom's Daughter Is My Ex. Although that series was a romantic comedy, he was fond of writing mystery stories, dating back to his debut novel. Despite his fondness for writing mystery novels, he was hesitant to write more of the genre due to low sales, as well as the difficulty in continuing to incorporate plot twists in his work. However, after writing the novel series Boku ga Kotaeru Kimi no Nazotoki, he realized that it was possible to write mysteries without relying on plot twists, thus giving him confidence to try the genre again.

Sherlock Academy was inspired by multiple influences, such as the Umineko When They Cry series by 07th Expansion. He noticed how many detective works included tropes such as Western-style mansions and locked rooms, but he wondered if such elements were necessary in the mystery genre, so he decided to focus on a detective school instead. He also took into account the reception to Boku ga Kotaeru Kimi no Nazotoki, noticing that it was better received among fans of the mystery genre than by light novel fans, so he wanted to write a story that would appeal to both. For the two main characters, Kamishiro wanted them to have a contrast, with Misaki initially being ambivalent towards detective work, while Shia is a skilled detective and intellectually curious.

== Media ==
=== Light novel ===
The series is written by Kyōsuke Kamishiro and illustrated by Shirabii. It is published by Media Factory under their MF Bunko J imprint, which released the first volume on June 23, 2023. Five volumes have been released as of June 25, 2026.

No.	Title	Release date	ISBN
1	Hanzai-Ō no Mago, Mei Tantei o Ronpa Suru (犯罪王の孫、名探偵を論破する)	June 23, 2023	978-4-04-682446-2
2	Makubesu Jakku Jakku (マクベス・ジャック・ジャック)	August 25, 2023	978-4-04-682774-6
3	Karasu ga Niji ni Somaru Toki (カラスが虹に染まる時)	March 25, 2024	978-4-04-683343-3
4	Hanzai RPG (犯罪RPG)	March 24, 2025	978-4-04-684638-9
5	Fuzai Tantei wa Fuzai Desu (不在探偵は不在です)	June 25, 2026	978-4-04-660164-3

=== Manga ===
A manga adaptation illustrated by Amechaya was announced on March 18, 2025. It began serialization on Bungeishunjū's Buncomi manga service on February 24, 2026. The first tankōbon volume was released on June 16, 2026.

No.	Japanese release date	Japanese ISBN
1	June 16, 2026	978-4-16-090246-6
2	December 16, 2026	978-4-16-090270-1

== Reception ==
The series was featured in the 2024 edition of Kono Light Novel ga Sugoi!, placing 22nd in the Paperback category and 10th in the New Releases category. The first volume was cited in a list of the best Japanese mystery novels released in June 2023.

== See also ==
- My Stepmom's Daughter Is My Ex, another light novel series written by Kyōsuke Kamishiro
