= Myriad Colors Phantom World =

Japanese light novel series and its adaptations

- The cover of the first volume featuring (clockwise) Koito Minase, Haruhiko Ichijo, Reina Izumi & Mai Kawakami

無彩限のファントム・ワールド (Musaigen no Fantomu Wārudo)
- Light novel
- Written by: Sōichirō Hatano
- Illustrated by: Shirabi
- Published by: Kyoto Animation
- Imprint: KA Esuma Bunko
- Original run: 20 December 2013 – 11 February 2016
- Volumes: 3
- Anime television series
- Directed by: Tatsuya Ishihara
- Produced by: Eharu Ōhashi; Shinichi Nakamura; Shigeru Saitō; Masayuki Nishide
- Written by: Fumihiko Shimo
- Music by: Effy
- Studio: Kyoto Animation
- Licensed by: Crunchyroll (Note: The name Crunchyroll refers to the entity formerly known as Funimation owned by Sony through its Sony Pictures and Aniplex subsidiaries after Ellation and its parent Otter Media were acquired in 2021 from AT&T.; The series is distributed for streaming and home video in North America, Latin America, United Kingdom (via Crunchyroll UK and Ireland), Australia (through Madman Anime) and Europe/Middle East/Africa (through Crunchyroll EMEA).)
- Original network: Tokyo MX, TVA, ABC, BS11, AT-X
- English network: SEA: Aniplus Asia
- Original run: 7 January 2016 – 31 March 2016
- Episodes: 13 + OVA
- icon

Myriad Colors Phantom World (無彩限のファントム・ワールド, Musaigen no Fantomu Wārudo) is a Japanese fantasy light novel series written by Sōichirō Hatano and illustrated by Shirabi. The series, set in the future Kamigyo ward, follows the accidental release of an unstable virus caused an epidemic that alters the human brain, leading to the creation of the beings called "phantoms".

An anime television adaptation by Kyoto Animation aired from January to March 2016.

== Plot ==
In the near future, the accidental release of an experimental virus causes an outbreak that changes the brain chemistry of every person in the world, allowing them to perceive extra-dimensional beings called "Phantoms". In addition, some children born after the outbreak have developed special powers that allow them to battle and seal Phantoms. Even though the vast majority of phantoms are harmless, many of these gifted children are placed in clubs, schools, and organizations dedicated to dealing with Phantoms that prove to be nuisances or threats to humanity. The story revolves around Haruhiko Ichijo and his friends in the Phantom-hunting Club of Hosea Academy, a private school for children with special abilities to seal Phantoms, and their everyday life and struggles, dealing with Phantoms.

== Characters ==
Haruhiko Ichijo (一条 晴彦, Ichijō Haruhiko)
Voiced by: Hiro Shimono, Omi Minami (child) (Japanese); Micah Solusod, Apphia Yu (child) (English)
A first-year high school student and the main character. His special ability is called The Book of Thoth, which consists of sealing or summoning Phantoms by drawing them in a sketchbook. Due to the library in his house, he has a lot of knowledge about numerous different subjects, but many times his facts are seen as useless by his teammates. His parents are separated but he hopes for them to be reunited as a family again. In the anime, most of the episodes begin with Haruhiko giving a brief explanation about certain topics.
Mai Kawakami (川神 舞, Kawakami Mai)
Voiced by: Sumire Uesaka (Japanese); Amber Lee Connors (English)
A second-year high school student, Haruhiko's senior and original partner. She specializes in close combat. Her special ability is called Spirit of the Five Elements, which consists of channeling elemental powers through her body, such as fire from her heart, earth from her spleen, metal from her lungs, water from her kidneys, and wood from her armpit. Mai has been known by Haruhiko to be hot-headed and violent ever since she was a child. She seems to harbor feelings for Haruhiko.
Reina Izumi (和泉 玲奈, Izumi Reina)
Voiced by: Saori Hayami (Japanese); Natalie Hoover (English)
A first-year high school student and a new member of Haruhiko's team. Her special ability is called Phantom Eater, an unusual power that allows her to seal Phantoms by consuming them. She has also been trained in basic self-defense, as seen when she assaults Haruhiko when he touches her. She has a large appetite and constantly struggles with getting enough money to eat, despite coming from a wealthy household. She has an older sister who ran away from home due to their parents being very strict as well as having a strong dislike towards Phantoms. She strongly admires Mai who she claims to resemble her older sister. She later develops feelings for Haruhiko.
Koito Minase (水無瀬 小糸, Minase Koito)
Voiced by: Maaya Uchida (Japanese); Jeannie Tirado (English)
A newly transferred student who is always wearing headphones. Her special ability is a powerful sound attack using her voice, which can stun or seal Phantoms. This first manifested when she was in elementary school when a Phantom attacked the rabbits that she was assigned to care for in the schoolyard. She managed to seal the Phantom with her special ability, but in the process damaged a large portion of the school. This caused her friends and even her parents to fear her and she eventually developed the anti-social personality that she has today. She tends to use a lot of sugar in her drinks. She is hinted to have feelings for Haruhiko.
Ruru (ルル)
Voiced by: Azusa Tadokoro (Japanese); Jad Saxton (English)
A friendly Phantom in the form of a small fairy. She always follows Haruhiko and enjoys making fun of him and the other characters. This character is original to the anime. Her full name is Rururaruri Rurararirararururirirari Rirararururararururararirari.
Kurumi Kumamakura (熊枕 久瑠美, Kumamakura Kurumi)
Voiced by: Misaki Kuno (Japanese); Tia Ballard (English)
An anime-original character, she is a shy fourth-grade student from the primary school division of Hosea Academy who looks up to Haruhiko's group. She always carries a teddy bear named Albrecht (named after Albert the Bear) and has a very strong affinity with bears as almost everything associated with her has "bear" ("kuma") in its name, including the animal itself, her birthplace (Kumamoto Prefecture), her favorite food (bear claw) and even her surname (Kumamakura). Her special ability enlarges Albrecht's size considerably and allows him to move on his own and fight. Like Koito, Kurumi's ability manifested at a very young age. She's quite fond of Haruhiko.
Shosuke Morohashi (諸橋 翔介, Morohashi Shōsuke)
Voiced by: Daisuke Sakaguchi (Japanese); Dallas Reid (English)
Haruhiko's friend and classmate who is usually envious of him because all of his teammates are beautiful girls.
Arisu Himeno (姫野 アリス, Himeno Arisu)
Voiced by: Kikuko Inoue (Japanese); Carli Mosier (English)
Haruhiko's teacher, who's responsible for assigning jobs to students with powers in order to deal with troublesome Phantoms in exchange for a reward.

== Media ==
=== Novel ===
The light novel was written by Sōichirō Hatano and illustrated by Shirabi. It was published by Kyoto Animation's novel imprint KA Esuma Bunko on 20 December 2013. The book received an honorable mention in the novel category of the fourth Kyoto Animation Award on 5 April 2013. Previous works to be featured in the awards have received anime adaptations. A second novel was released on 30 October 2015. A third novel was released on 11 February 2016.

No.	Title	Japanese release date	Japanese ISBN
1	Myriad Colors Phantom World (無彩限のファントム・ワールド)	20 December 2013	978-4-907064-13-6
2	Myriad Colors Phantom World 2 (無彩限のファントム・ワールド 2)	30 October 2015	978-4-907064-34-1
3	Myriad Colors Phantom World 3 (無彩限のファントム・ワールド 3)	11 February 2016	978-4-907064-45-7

=== Anime ===
An anime television series aired between 7 January and 31 March 2016 on ABC Asahi, Tokyo MX, TV Aichi, and BS11. (Note: The premiere is given as 6 January at 12:30 AM, which is in fact the morning of 7 January.) The series was directed by Tatsuya Ishihara and written by Fumihiko Shimo, with animation produced by Kyoto Animation. Kazumi Ikeda handled the series' character designs, and also served as the chief animation director. Shinpei Sawa provided the designs for the Phantoms. The series' music was composed by Effy. Additionally, Ryuuta Nakagami served as director of photography; Mikiko Watanabe was the series' art director; Kana Miyata provided the color key; Hiroshi Karata was in charge of accessories planning; and Yota Tsuruoka was the sound director. The opening theme song is "Naked Dive" by Screen Mode, while the ending theme is "Junshin Always" (純真Always; "Innocence Always") by Azusa Tadokoro. The anime was released on seven Blu-ray and DVD compilation volumes containing two episodes and one picture drama each between 6 April and 5 October 2016. An original video animation was bundled with the seventh volume. Crunchyroll streamed the series, while Funimation released the series in North America on home video, and Madman Entertainment distributes the title in Australia and New Zealand on behalf of Funimation.

==== Episodes ====
No.	Title	Directed by	Written by	Original release date
1	"The Age of Phantoms"; Transliteration: "Fantomu no Jidai" (Japanese: ファントムの時代)	Yoshiji Kigami	Fumihiko Shimo	7 January 2016
Team partners Haruhiko Ichijo and Mai Kawakami hunt down a Fire Phantom wreaking havoc at the high school division of their prestigious private school Hosea Academy, but Arisu Himeno, their supervisor of the Phantom-hunting Club in the Neural Error Corrections Room, confiscates their reward since they caused damage to the high school clock statue. Wandering into a cemetery, Haruhiko witnesses Reina Izumi using her special ability to consume Cemetery Phantoms. Fascinated by this, Haruhiko tries to recruit Reina on his team in the Phantom-hunting Club, though she initially refuses. After Haruhiko treats Reina to lunch in the high school cafeteria, he explains that the Alayashiki Company's research facility was hit by a terrorist bomb over a decade ago, releasing a virus that infected the human brain. This caused changes in brain function, resulting in everyone being able to see Phantoms, which are any ghosts, yōkai, monsters and other supernatural beings. Moreover, children born after the incident were given special abilities genetically designed to fight Phantoms. Those with special abilities established club-like groups within their schools in order to seal and expunge troublesome Phantoms for a reward. After Haruhiko introduces Reina to Mai, the three of them set off to deal with wooden Utility Pole Phantoms called Tsukumogamis, which are causing radio disturbances. Reina successfully seals the Tsukumogamis after Mai competes with them in a traditional game of limbo. Haruhiko says that the human brain's cognitive ability is surprisingly fickle and unreliable as seen with optical illusions, that is until the human brain underwent a drastic change due to a large-scale event that happened over a decade ago, where a myriad of phantasmal beings were released into the world intertwining what is reality and fantasy.
2	"Take Out the Annoying UFO!"; Transliteration: "Meiwaku Yūfō o Yattsukero!" (Japanese: 迷惑UFOをやっつけろ！)	Noriyuki Kitanohara	Fumihiko Shimo	14 January 2016
Haruhiko wants to be more valuable to his team by learning how to summon Phantoms using his sketchbook. Arisu assigns Haruhiko, Mai and Reina to assist Koito Minase, a newly transferred student who first manifested her special ability of her singing voice at a young age. They are requested to go to the Alayashiki Company's abandoned factory, where there have been reports of a Security Robot Phantom causing a disturbance by controlling drones. Since the Security Robot Phantom uses antiphase sound waves to cancel out Koito's singing voice, Haruhiko, Mai, Reina and Koito work together to seal the Security Robot Phantom. While Mai and Reina cool off at Haruhiko's house, Haruhiko's Fairy Phantom named Ruru reveals that she found a mysterious gadget at the abandoned factory. The next day, Haruhiko tells Mai and Reina that a Parole is a unique spell used by special ability users. Arisu soon assigns Haruhiko, Mai and Reina to deal with a strange UFO Phantom that peeps on the college girls in their dormitory. While Mai and Reina lure the UFO Phantom by wearing towels, Haruhiko eventually implements his Parole by summoning a sketch of Marchosias using a cut on his finger. Although appearing as a winged puppy, Marchosias still manages to capture the UFO Phantom, allowing Reina to seal the UFO Phantom. Reina heals Haruhiko's cut finger with her mouth. As Koito passes by, she is unimpressed by how Haruhiko, Mai and Reina handled the task. Haruhiko says that a Phantom is an illusion by definition, and reality is actually an elaborate illusion that the human brain manufactures. Phantoms wreaking havoc must be sealed, but they have been known to reappear. It is still unclear whether Phantoms have always existed or are mere figments of imagination.
3	"Operation Copy-Paste Memories"; Transliteration: "Kioku Kopipe Sakusen" (Japanese: 記憶コピペ作戦)	Haruka Fujita	Fumihiko Shimo	21 January 2016
Haruhiko, Mai and Reina meet up at the train station, where Mai recalls being a wallflower during childhood. They are tasked to deal with two female Bridge Phantoms who challenges people to a contest of strength. The Bridge Phantoms are specifically seeking to fight Mai, but she quickly loses against them. Haruhiko summons Marchosias as a distraction for a tactical retreat. The next day, Mai attempts to train Haruhiko and Reina in combat. Haruhiko then suggests for Mai to copy her semantic memory, episodic memory and procedural memory into his brain without the need to train in combat. With Arisu's help, Haruhiko and Mai visit an amusement park, a movie theater and a climbing gym among other places in order to synchronize shared memories, though Reina expresses jealousy. Heading back to the bridge, Haruhiko and Mai are challenged to a fight by the Bridge Phantoms. Haruhiko and Mai end up synchronizing shared memories, to which Haruhiko realizes that the Bridge Phantoms are actually two girls whom Mai befriended during her preschool field trip ten years ago. Believing that Mai was rather extroverted instead of introverted, Haruhiko concludes that Mai altered her memories. Since Haruhiko lacks the stamina needed to fight, Arisu suggests for Haruhiko to implement Mai's special ability. Haruhiko and Mai perform a simultaneous attack using Mai's special ability of the five elements against the Bridge Phantoms, who finally vanish after accepting defeat. The next day, Arisu suspects that Mai's memories will vanish from Haruhiko's brain within a few days, while Reina wonders if she will ever become closer to Haruhiko and Mai. Haruhiko says that there is actual research being done right now on data backup for human memory, but the research is only being done on humans and not Phantoms for the moment.
4	"Fake Family"; Transliteration: "Mozō Kazoku" (Japanese: 模造家族)	Taichi Ishidate	Fumihiko Shimo	28 January 2016
Haruhiko, Mai and Reina go to an all-you-can-eat restaurant, where Reina proves her large appetite. At sunset, Reina boards a mysterious red bus on her way home. The next day, Koito confirms that the red bus is actually a Bus Phantom that has possessed Reina. At the next sunset, Mai and Koito watch as Haruhiko and Reina board the Bus Phantom before it disappears. Haruhiko and Reina find themselves in a fantasy house, where Reina is entranced by two Bunny Phantoms acting as her perfect parents at the dining table, while Haruhiko is believed to be Reina's older brother. Waking up outside Reina's house, Haruhiko and Reina realize that almost no time has passed since they boarded the red bus. The following day, Koito explains that the Bus Phantom hypnotizes victims by using food and takes over their consciousness. Reina says that her older sister ran away from home because her strict parents despise Phantoms. At the following sunset, Haruhiko, Mai and Reina board the Bus Phantom, finding themselves in the same fantasy house, in which Mai is believed to be Reina's older sister. Entering the bathroom as a way to snap out of it, Haruhiko manages to help Reina come to her senses. Reina is nearly persuaded by the Bunny Phantoms offering her to stay in the fantasy house. However, she chooses to abandon the fantasy house when Haruhiko reveals that he is still waiting for his mother to come home. The next day, Haruhiko and Mai learn that Reina came clean to her parents and received permission to stay in the Phantom-hunting Club. Haruhiko says that human culture varies depending on time and place, but they have language and family systems in common, in which some societies choose to separate birth and parenting.
5	"I Can't Use My Special Abilities!"; Transliteration: "Tokui Nōryoku ga Tsukaenai!" (Japanese: 特異能力が使えない！)	Takuya Yamamura	Fumihiko Shimo	4 February 2016
Koito uses her special ability in order to seal a Train Phantom. She notes that she keeps her distance from people ever since her special ability surfaced four years ago. During lunch, Haruhiko's friend Shosuke Morohashi says that Koito appears standoffish even though she used to be popular. Arisu assigns Koito to deal with a Dragon Phantom attacking the school chicken coops and rabbit hutches. Upon meeting Kurumi Kumamakura at the primary school division of Hosea Academy, Koito encounters the Dragon Phantom, but it renders her special ability useless. Just as Haruhiko, Mai and Reina arrive to help, Kurumi uses her special ability of transforming her inanimate teddy bear Albrecht into an animate fighting giant, causing the Dragon Phantom to flee. Arisu suggests a race to determine who will be the first to hunt down the Dragon Phantom. Mai, Reina and Kurumi form a team, while Haruhiko and Koito reluctantly form another team. Haruhiko and Koito are the first to find and confront the Dragon Phantom, but it flees once again. Arisu later tells Haruhiko that the Dragon Phantom awakened Koito's special ability four years ago. Stubbornly and solely facing the Dragon Phantom at the zoo, Koito is soon saved by the timely arrival of Haruhiko, Mai, Reina and Kurumi, who all combine their special abilities in order to seal the Dragon Phantom. Reina heals Koito's injuries with her mouth. Arisu reveals that the Dragon Phantom is different from the one that Koito encountered four years ago. At his house, Haruhiko tries to repair the mysterious gadget, and Koito waits outside in order to give her thanks and apologies to him before storming off. Haruhiko says that singing a favorite song can arouse the auditory cortex, thus triggering the secretion of pleasure hormones. In fact, singing is effective in rehabilitation, and it helps in memorizing large amounts of text. Singing in groups makes doing arduous tasks more bearable and efficient.
6	"Kurumi and the Teddy Bear Kingdom"; Transliteration: "Kurumi to Nuigurumi Ōkoku" (Japanese: 久瑠美とぬいぐるみ王国)	Taichi Ogawa	Yuka Yamada	11 February 2016
Kurumi is afraid to disappoint the people who rely on her and would prefer not to be involved in fighting Phantoms. At a crosswalk, Kurumi encounters Haruhiko, as they are transported to a fantasy kingdom inhabited by sentient teddy bears. Kurumi is claimed to be their missing princess, while Albrecht appears as Kurumi's royal guard, defending her from the Higuman teddy bear soldiers in service to the evil prince Salmon de Higuman III. In his lair, Albrecht tells Haruhiko and Kurumi that Salmon plans to marry Kurumi after he took over the throne. Albrecht departs after returning a golden rake to Kurumi as her family heirloom. Haruhiko concludes that they are stranded in an alternate world created from Kurumi's memories centered around bears, including the animal itself, her favorite food, her birthplace and her surname. Albrecht arrives to report that Salmon is planning to attack with his vanguard. Meanwhile at the Neural Error Corrections Room, Koito tells Mai and Reina that Kurumi is capable of fighting but needs to get over her mental hangups. After Albrecht is shot with a bow and arrow, Haruhiko and Kurumi take Albrecht to the forest, where Kurumi remembers that Albrecht gave her the confidence to make new friends. When Salmon attacks with a giant robot teddy bear, Kurumi overcomes her fear and confronts Salmon by herself. Kurumi activates the golden rake, which transforms her into a magical girl, allowing her to easily defeat Salmon. Haruhiko and Kurumi then leave the fantasy kingdom and return to the crosswalk in the real world. Back at the Neural Error Corrections Room, Mai asks Kurumi to come along in order to deal with a Phantom, and Kurumi happily agrees to help. Haruhiko says that young children have their attachments to dolls or blankets in order to feel safer. Commonly called security blankets, these items taken away from a child will certainly cause them to panic.
7	"Schrödinger's Cat Mansion"; Transliteration: "Shurēdingā no Neko Yashiki" (Japanese: シュレーディンガーの猫屋敷)	Eisaku Kawanami	Reiko Yoshida	18 February 2016
At the high school, the students unknowingly begin behaving like cats, notably long naps and fish cravings. Mai explains that a nearby cat mansion was previously a dormitory, but it was closed down after it was overrun by stray cats. Kurumi asks Haruhiro, Mai and Reina to track down a missing kitten named Rudolph for her friend Arina. The next day, Mai, Reina, Koito and even Kurumi are among the students who show up to the high school with cat ears and cat tails, much to Haruhiko's shock. Haruhiko, Mai, Reina, Koito and Kurumi explore the cat mansion, where they eventually realize that they are inside a Cat Mansion Phantom, though Koito and Mai are each unable to seal the Cat Mansion Phantom. Thanks to Kurumi's plea, the Cat Mansion Phantom returns Rudolph, restores the cat mansion and reverts all the students back to normal. Kurumi explains that the Cat Mansion Phantom was lonely when the cat mansion was closed down and the stray cats went away. Before leaving, Haruhiko, Mai, Reina, Koito and Kurumi clean the cat mansion, while Arisu comes by to announce that the cat mansion will be turned into a tea house for the students. Haruhiko says that Schrödinger's cat is a thought experiment, demonstrated by a sealed box which contains radioactive material, a radiation detector, a toxin emitter and a cat. This thought experiment illustrates a paradox of quantum superposition, which theorizes that the cat would be both dead and alive if there was any atomic decay.
8	"Break Through the Monkey Hot Spring!"; Transliteration: "Saru Onsen o Toppa Seyo!" (Japanese: 猿温泉を突破せよ！)	Noriyuki Kitanohara	Masashi Nishikawa	25 February 2016
Under the sweltering heat, the high school grounds have transformed into a hot spring guarded by an adult male Monkey Phantom. Several students including Shosuke, the Beach Angels, Mai, Haruhiko, Kurumi and Koito each fail in their attempt to seal the Monkey Phantom. Haruhiko and Mai then dress up as a pantomime horse and approach the hot spring, but their cover is easily blown. Later on, Haruhiko suggests for Reina, Kurumi and Koito to pose in their one-piece swimsuits as a way to lure the Monkey Phantom out of the hot spring, but the Monkey Phantom does not find the three of them attractive enough. As a last resort, Haruhiko paints Mai's buttocks red as a way to attract the Monkey Phantom. However, Mai accidentally spills red paint on Haruhiko's sketchbook, making Haruhiko unable to complete his sketch. Instead, Haruhiko summons Cthulhu, though appearing as a giant baby octopus, in order to capture the Monkey Phantom, allowing Koito to bind the Monkey Phantom. Ruru learns that the Monkey Phantom was abandoned by his wife and wanted to relax in the hot spring. A mock wedding is held in order to cheer up the Monkey Phantom, and Haruhiko plays the unfortunate role of the bride. The hot spring disappears as the Monkey Phantom departs from the high school with a reluctant Haruhiko in tow. Haruhiko says that humanity has enjoyed the use of hot springs for centuries. They are more of a leisure activity for tourism and skincare these days, but they were primarily used for health and well-being in the past. Some of the benefits include improved circulation and stimulating parasympathetic nerve activity.
9	"The Strange Tale of the Bakumatsu Phantom"; Transliteration: "Bakumatsu Fantomu Ibun" (Japanese: 幕末ファントム異聞)	Yoshiji Kigami	Fumihiko Shimo	3 March 2016
Ayumi Kitajima, the sole member of the Drama Club, eventually convinces Haruhiko, Mai, Reina, Ruru, Koito and Kurumi to participate in the regional competition for her play loosely based on the Ikedaya incident. Haruhiko, Reina, Ruru and Mai are respectively cast as Toshizo Hijikata, Soji Okita, Isami Kondo and the Phantom's hostage, while Kurumi and Koito are respectively cast as Ryoma Sakamoto and Izo Okada. Ayumi also casts herself as the Phantom. The rehearsals were arduous but gratifying. On the day of the regional competition, Haruhiko, Mai, Reina, Ruru, Koito and Kurumi begin their performance. In the middle of the play, Ayumi is revealed to be a Bakumatsu Phantom, who was manifested from the suppressed rage and frustration of losing the regional competition for ten straight years. Moreover, Ayumi pretended to be a sophomore drama student by manipulating the memories of the others. Instead of sealing Ayumi, the others decide to finish the play. Ayumi then transforms the stage into an illusion of the scenery around and inside Ikedaya Inn, while the audience members serve as extras. Haruhiko, Mai, Reina, Ruru, Koito and Kurumi follow the script, leading to a triumphant battle against Ayumi. The stage finally returns to normal, and they win the regional competition. The next day, Ayumi insists that the others can make it to the national competition with more intensive rehearsals throughout the entire summer vacation. Haruhiko says that people are drawn to watching period dramas because the exploits of legendary heroes are exciting or perhaps it is to learn the lessons of the past. Human beings have a deep desire to inform and enrich the collective unconscious, which can be achieved by telling stories about what people of yore experience through the power of theater.
10	"Little Ruru's Big Dream"; Transliteration: "Chiisai Ruru no Ōkina Yume" (Japanese: 小さいルルの大きな夢)	Haruka Fujita	Yuka Yamada	10 March 2016
After Haruhiko accidentally steps on Ruru, she becomes tired of being small. At a park, Ruru meets a benevolent Witch Phantom, whose purpose is to grant the wishes of other Phantoms. As Ruru immediately wishes to be human-sized, the Witch Phantom transforms Ruru into a human girl and arranges for her to be in Haruhiko's class as a transfer student named Natsuno Ramune. The only catch is that Ruru cannot fly, and that she will go back to being fairy-sized if anyone finds out her true identity. Haruhiko soon introduces Natsuno to the Phantom-hunting Club, and Natsuno provides a believable sob story. Heading to the fireworks festival dressed in yukata, Natsuno feels guilty when Haruhiko, Mai, Reina, Koito, Kurumi and Arisu all desire for Ruru to be there with them. Meanwhile, the Witch Phantom finds a discarded Firework Phantom, granting his wish to go off with an unforgettable bang. During the fireworks festival, Haruhiko bandages Natsuno's sore feet while confiding in her that he wants Ruru to be there with him even though she is usually troublesome. The Firework Phantom crashes the fireworks festival, putting people at risk with his imminent explosion. As Koito, Reina, Mai and Kurumi are each unable to seal the Firework Phantom, Haruhiko ends up attached to the Firework Phantom. In order to regain her ability to fly, Natsuno reveals her true identity as Ruru, reverting to her fairy-sized self. The Firework Phantom releases Haruhiko into the river after Ruru convinces the Firework Phantom to explode higher in the sky with her. Ruru surprisingly reappears unharmed, and Haruhiko scolds Ruru for causing worry. As a display of fireworks explode in the sky, Haruhiko buys a bottle of ramune for Ruru and apologizes for stepping on her earlier. Haruhiko says that fireworks were used to mourn the dead and entertain the poor during the Edo period, where famine and disease wreaked havoc on Japan. Nowadays, fireworks festivals are a summertime tradition.
11	"Tiny Haruhiko"; Transliteration: "Chibikko Haruhiko-kun" (Japanese: ちびっ子晴彦くん)	Taichi Ishidate	Reiko Yoshida	17 March 2016
A scene shows Mai protecting a young boy from a Sandman Phantom. A few days ago, Ruru asks Haruhiko, Mai, Reina, Koito and Kurumi what they were like as children. At night, Haruhiko finds a tin box full of childhood mementos. The next morning, Haruhiko wakes up as a kid version of himself with no memory of being a teenager. He attends the primary school, believing that he is still in first grade. Kurumi finds Haruhiko and brings him to the Neural Error Corrections Room. Arisu advises Haruhiko to attend his high school classes, while Mai reluctantly volunteers to look after him at her house. Despite Haruhiko being polite and intelligent for a kid, Mai juggles studying at the high school, working at a diner, hunting down Phantoms and caring for Haruhiko, which takes a toll on her health. At night, Mai calms down Haruhiko from his astraphobia by relating how they both deal with things by themselves. The following afternoon, Mai takes Haruhiko to the playground, where she becomes nearly exhausted. Just then, an angry Sandman Phantom emerges from a sandbox after being treated like a litter box. Mai collapses while trying to seal the Sandman Phantom running rampant. Haruhiko wishes to stop being a kid, which suddenly reverts him to a teenager, though he appears wearing only his underwear since he has outgrown his clothes. He quickly summons Cthulhu and easily defeats the Sandman Phantom, thus saving Mai. Haruhiko changes clothes back at his house, where Mai learns that Haruhiko does not remember what happened for the past few days. Mai reads a letter that Haruhiko wrote as a kid, which details a perfect Sunday at the playground with his parents. She believes that this letter was just a fantasy, similar to what happened with Kurumi from before. At the diner, Haruhiko is teased by the girls about him being cute as a kid.
12	"The Mother Hath Returned"; Transliteration: "Haha wa Kaerinu" (Japanese: 母は帰りぬ)	Takuya Yamamura	Fumihiko Shimo	24 March 2016
With summer vacation right around the corner, Haruhiko, Mai, Reina, Koito and Kurumi have the highest grades compared to the other teams in the Phantom-hunting Club. Koito tells Haruhiko that he has been repairing a communication device for accessing the Alayashiki Company's servers. The next day, Arisu warns the students about an unidentified female Phantom named Enigma, who attacked three students from another school and stole their special abilities. Later on, the Beach Angels are attacked by Enigma, who steals their special abilities by kissing them. Haruhiko, Mai and Koito come to the rescue and attempt to seal Enigma, but she vanishes without a trace. Since the Beach Angels never regained their special abilities, it is deduced that Enigma is still on the run. While Haruhiko continues repairing the communication device, he receives a phone call from his mother to meet up at the playground. After they reconcile, Haruhiko's mother agrees to live with Haruhiko again. One week later, Mai, Reina, Koito and Kurumi deal with a Sunflower Phantom. After spying on Haruhiko and his mother at a grocery store, Koito tells Mai, Reina and Kurumi that Haruhiko's mother might be a Phantom. Mai, Reina, Koito and Kurumi visit Haruhiko's house for dinner. Haruhiko's mother embarrasses Haruhiko by sending her blessing for the girls to marry him. Mai is contacted by Arisu, who informs that Haruhiko's mother has been reported missing for a week. Suddenly, Mai is attacked by Haruhiko's mother, revealing that she is possessed by Enigma. The girls helplessly watch as Enigma steals Haruhiko's special ability by kissing him before she leaves the unconscious body of Haruhiko's mother and flees. To make matters worse, Haruhiko and Ruru simultaneously fall unconscious, much to the worry of the girls. Haruhiko says that Phantoms are thought to be hallucinations. It is believed that Phantoms owe their existence largely to the human subconscious as well as the brain's language center. Everyone carries in their mind Jungian archetypal figures, including impressions of the great mother, the wise old sage who guides us, themselves as the opposite sex and the shadow.
13	"The Eternal Phantom World"; Transliteration: "Eien no Fantomu Wārudo" (Japanese: 永遠のファントム・ワールド)	Yasuhiro Takemoto	Fumihiko Shimo	31 March 2016
As Haruhiko's mother has been admitted to the Alayashiki Company's hospital, Haruhiko meets his new stepfather, who gives Haruhiko a picture book that his mother had cherished. Since Haruhiko has lost his special ability, Haruhiko, Mai, Reina and Kurumi later notice that Ruru is acting more like Haruhiko. After being unable to track Enigma, Koito meets up with the others and demands for the communication device to be fixed. Thanks to Kurumi for using Albrecht in order to repair the communication device, it is discovered that Enigma was a project by the Alayashiki Company, which has been researching how to artificially enhance Phantoms by pooling data on students with special abilities, but Enigma has gone rogue and has been attacking innocent humans. Koito is informed that Enigma has infiltrated the research facility. Arisu drives Haruhiko, Mai, Reina, Ruru, Koito and Kurumi to the rear gate while explaining that Enigma is after classified data at the hospital, which she can use in combination with Haruhiko's stolen special ability in order to achieve world domination. Grateful for being the very peak of evolution, Enigma easily overwhelms the girls. Haruhiko attempts to fight Enigma, who assumes the form of Haruhiko's mother, but Haruhiko is hurt while protecting Ruru. Arisu reveals that Ruru is a manifestation of the freewheeling personality that Haruhiko subconsciously repressed with the possibility that Haruhiko and Ruru share the same special ability. The only way that Haruhiko can regain his special ability is by kissing Ruru, which they do so after some hesitation. While Enigma summons the Phantoms that Haruhiko previously sealed, Haruhiko summons Marchosias and Cthulhu in their true adult forms. With the help of the girls, Haruhiko manages to seal and expunge Enigma, who enjoyed her time as Haruhiko's mother. With Ruru back to normal, Haruhiko sheds joyful tears when he reunites with his mother, who has awakened in the hospital. The Alayashiki Company was investigated and held accountable for hiding the truth, while affected students have regained their stolen special abilities. Haruhiko later realizes that Ruru looks like a character in the picture book. With life returning to normal, Haruhiko notes that he accepts the fact that fantasy and reality has become blurred in the world.
OVA	"The Polka Dot Miracle"; Transliteration: "Mizutama no Kiseki" (Japanese: 水玉の奇跡)	Eisaku Kawanami	Yuka Yamada	5 October 2016
The students of Hosea Academy take a summer trip to a seaside resort. Haruhiko expresses that he hates summer, and he would rather stay indoors and read books. The boys point out that the girls will be wearing their bikinis. Upon arrival, the innkeeper explains that a Sea Monster Phantom scares away visitors every summer. Arisu then says that the rooms and meals will be complimentary if the Sea Monster Phantom is sealed. With no sign of the Sea Monster Phantom, the students enjoy their time at the seaside resort. Under the moonlight on the balcony, Ruru interrupts a potential bonding moment between Haruhiko and Mai. Reina, Koito and Kurumi join them while sharing dango. The next day, the students have fun in the sea. The Sea Monster Phantom appears and emits a mist at the students, creating an optical illusion of nudity with a polka dot phenomenon. Despite their efforts of modesty, the students fail in their attempt to seal the Sea Monster Phantom. When Haruhiko summons Marchosias and Chtulu in order to repel the effect of the polka dot phenomenon, the Sea Monster Phantom gets angry and emits a mist again, creating another optical illusion of nudity with white censor bars this time. After Haruhiko figures out that the Sea Monster Phantom can adjust the air temperature to change the refractivity, Koito, Mai, Kurumi and Reina each use their special abilities to trap, attack, capture and seal the Sea Monster Phantom. As the students can finally enjoy summer vacation, Haruhiko makes it back to shore after being swept by the wind waves caused by the girls. He returns without wearing his swim trunks, now actually nude instead of an optical illusion. Mai, Reina, Koito and Kurumi run away in embarrassment, while Haruhiko loudly expresses that he hates summer, even though Ruru likes it. Haruhiko says that seeing a water spot on the ceiling that appears to be a face, a man wearing sunglasses who appears to be attractive or a woman wearing a rice hat who appears to be beautiful are all examples of optical illusions, which simply prove that human perception can be fickle and fallible.

== Reception ==
Jonah Welland of CBR.com wrote in November 2022 that the series received poor criticism as it was "generic". He also described that the elements of the series had felt "half-baked and rushed, lacking the usual creativity the studio is known for."
