= No-Rin =

Japanese light novel series and its adaptations

- First volume cover, featuring Ringo Kinoshita in her idol persona

のうりん (Nōrin)
- Genre: Romantic comedy
- Light novel
- Written by: Shirow Shiratori
- Illustrated by: Kippu
- Published by: SB Creative
- Imprint: GA Bunko
- Original run: August 15, 2011 – present
- Volumes: 13
- Manga
- Written by: Shirow Shiratori
- Illustrated by: Maru Asakura
- Published by: Square Enix
- Magazine: Young Gangan
- Original run: March 16, 2012 – June 5, 2015
- Volumes: 8
- Manga

No-Rin: Petit
- Written by: Shirow Shiratori
- Illustrated by: Kotoji
- Published by: Square Enix
- Magazine: Big Gangan
- Original run: August 24, 2013 – August 25, 2014
- Volumes: 2
- Manga

No-Rin -Wild-
- Written by: Shirow Shiratori
- Illustrated by: Toshiko Machida
- Published by: SB Creative
- Magazine: GA Bunko Magazine
- Original run: October 17, 2013 – present
- Volumes: 2
- Anime television series
- Directed by: Shin Oonuma
- Written by: Michiko Yokote
- Music by: Tomoki Kikuya
- Studio: Silver Link
- Licensed by: AUS: Madman Entertainment; NA: Funimation; UK: Anime Limited
- Original network: Tokyo MX, TV Aichi, Sun TV, GBS, BS11, Animax
- Original run: January 10, 2014 – March 29, 2014
- Episodes: 12
- icon

No-Rin (Japanese: のうりん, Hepburn: Nōrin; lit. 'Agriculture and Forestry') is a Japanese light novel series written by Shirow Shiratori, with illustrations by Kippu. A 12-episode anime television series adaptation by Silver Link aired from January to March 2014. Funimation streamed the series on their video website.

== Plot ==
The sudden retirement of the famous idol Yuka Kusakabe from the entertainment industry shocks the world and devastates her biggest fan, a teenager named Kosaku Hata. His classmates at the Tamo Agriculture School manage to get him out of his depression and bring him out of his room to attend his classes. However, as he does, Kusakabe enters their class under the name Ringo Kinoshita as a transfer student. Kosaku realizes he has a once-in-a-lifetime opportunity to get to personally know his dream girl. With his group of friends, and under the persuasion of his teacher, he tries to find out why she came to the agricultural school.

== Characters ==
Kōsaku Hata (畑 耕作, Hata Kōsaku)
Voiced by: Shintarō Asanuma (Japanese); Austin Tindle (English)
Class representative of 2-A class. His parents had decided to move to Aioi and become farmers when he was very little, but the failure of the family's first crop left them in debt and caused the family to fracture, with his mother having to work part-time and his father continuously leaving town to find work. Eventually, his mother became sick and died, after which his father left town for good and abandoned him. Afterward, he was raised by Minori's family. Kosaku idolizes Yuka Kusakabe, whom he sees as a symbol for a life in the city that he desperately craves. He enrolled in an agriculture school just so he can send his grown vegetables anonymously to her, and is devastated upon hearing of her retirement. He is surprised, however, when he discovers that his idol has become his classmate, albeit under another name and as a seemingly different person. He is somehow oblivious to Minori's feelings for him despite the fact that he gets flustered by any suggestive language from her. It also appears that Ringo has feelings for Kōsaku, since she gets seemingly jealous over suggestive stories about him and Minori. He also prefers feet more than breasts.
Ringo Kinoshita (木下 林檎, Kinoshita Ringo)
Voiced by: Yukari Tamura (Japanese); Jad Saxton (English)
A former idol who previously performed under the stage name Yuka Kusakabe (草壁 ゆか, Kusakabe Yuka). She unexpectedly retires from show business and enrolls herself at the Tamo Agricultural school. Unlike her idol persona, she, as Ringo, is more reserved and quiet. She is somewhat a rival of Minori for what seems to be Kōsaku's affection (she has called Minori a "Fat Ass" and a "Meddling Bug" in the third episode while competing to plant rice in a rice field), yet they end up on good terms after the incident. She appears to be conscious of her slender figure as the mention of her having small breasts or being called "flat" can make her violently angry. It is eventually revealed that Ringo came to the school because Minori wrote her a letter about Kosaku, which caused her to fall in love with him. She confesses her feelings to him in the eighth novel, and they begin dating.
Minori Nakazawa (中沢 農, Nakazawa Minori)
Voiced by: Kana Hanazawa (Japanese); Lynsey Hale (English)
Kōsaku's childhood best friend. She has a major crush on Kōsaku and her over-protectiveness shot up with Ringo's arrival. She even challenged her in episode 3 to a series of contests because of that. Though after what seems to be their "fight" on the rice (she called Ringo a "Thieving Cat" during that time), they seem to be friendly with each other. She speaks with a Mino dialect. She is revealed to be very ticklish in episode 4. She mentioned that Kosaku often stayed with her (as he had no mother and his father was always out) and took baths with her and her three sisters until eighth grade, much to Rintarō's envy.
Kei Kamatori (過真鳥 継, Kamatori Kei)
Voiced by: Wataru Hatano (Japanese); Derick Snow (English)
A friend of Kōsaku and Minori. At times he is analytical, but he is notorious for wearing mankinis whenever water is involved. He also rides a goat he calls Yakul. He is the son of the owner of a big agricultural company--to whom he lost in an agricultural sale showdown, prompting him to go abroad for the seminar he was offered. He had a falling out with his father due to the latter using chemicals in his farming methods that his wife, Kei's mother, was terribly sensitive to and contributed to her early death. This is the reason behind Kei's desire to farm only organic goods without the use of chemicals, such as pesticides. He reveals in episode 10 that he asked his aunt to adopt him after his falling out with his father, which explains why his surname is Kamatori and not Menjō.
Jane Natalie Hansen III (ジェーン・ナタリー・ハンセン三世, Jēn Natarī Hansen Sansei)
International student from Texas.
Kochō Yoshida (良田 胡蝶, Yoshida Kochō)
Voiced by: Marina Inoue (Japanese); Megan Shipman (English)
Kōsaku's classmate and one of the Shitennō (四天農; lit. 'Four Heavenly Farmers'), "Boin Yoshida". She majors in animal husbandry. She is shown to have a crush towards Kei, but she denies it in front of others. She switches from a proud, stern personality to a timid, stuttering one when she feels embarrassed or shy. A recurring gag in the series is that people tend to mention and/or emphasize her great bust size and harass her for it, much (mostly) to her embarrassment. She later accompanies Kei to a seminar abroad that both of them were invited to.
Akari Suzuki (鈴木 燈, Suzuki Akari)
Voiced by: Yuka Ōtsubo (Japanese); Bryn Apprill (English)
Class representative of 2-B class and one of the Shitennō, "Bio Suzuki". An expert in biotechnology, and has invented a yogurt culture that one can just apply--partly using it as a means to justify her bukkake fetish by having Kosaku and Kei shoot each other with it. She is usually dressed in a Gothic Lolita outfit. Like Kanegami, she tends to go with the flow of the other Shitennō.
Torao Kanegami (金上 虎於, Kanegami Torao)
Voiced by: Mariko Higashiuchi (Japanese); Morgan Garrett (English)
Class representative of 2-D class and one of the Shitennō, "Money Kanegami". A master of anything related to making money by all means necessary--even to the point of getting suspended; but considers it fun. She also tends to go with the flow of the other Shitennō. She is known for her flashy earrings (The signs for the Dollar and Yen).
Kaoru Hanazono (花園 カヲル, Hanazono Kaoru)
Voiced by: Kishō Taniyama (Japanese); Joel McDonald (English)
Class representative of 2-E class and one of the Shitennō, "Rose Hanazono". He is an expert in the art of landscaping, but Kōsaku is kind of at odds with him for making a pass at Minori despite his gender preference. His true inclination was revealed when he invited over Ringo under the pretense of luring Kōsaku. He was able to successfully kiss him by taking advantage of the fact that Kōsaku is not aware of what sex he is really into even though Kei stormed in to warn him. Kei warned Kōsaku to late.
Rintarō Miyamoto (宮本 林太郎, Miyamoto Rintarō)
Voiced by: Nobuyuki Hiyama (Japanese); Jarrod Greene (English)
Class representative of 2-F class and one of the Shitennō, "Woodman Rintarō". He has mastery of the forestry trade, but he is fiercely jealous of the fact that there are two attractive girls close to Kōsaku; and is desperate to, at least, have a girl sit beside him (all due to the fact that there are no girls in his class). Although Kōsaku mentioned that his class once had a female classmate, Rintarō angrily states that she ran away after one day. It is stated that he is weak against love triangles.
Natsumi Bekki (戸次 菜摘, Bekki Natsumi)
Voiced by: Chiwa Saitō (Japanese); Tia Ballard (English)
Also known as "Becky," she is the Homeroom teacher of 2-A class. Because of her mood swings in her class, she has this trait of suddenly plunging the entire class into despair. Despite her young looks and demeanor, she is forty years old. A running gag involves Bekki and Kōsaku in hilarious situations such as telling her that it's okay to do "it" since it is him. She is desperate to get married, and this desperation results in her erratic, near-hysterical behavior, especially when the very subject of it is brought up, and often gets jealous of younger girls. It is also mentioned the only reason she has not yet been fired for her inappropriate behavior is because her father is an important politician.
Kuwanosuke Naganawa (永縄 鍬之介, Naganawa Kuwanosuke)
Voiced by: Tomokazu Sugita (Japanese); Mark Stoddard (English)
Principal of Tamo Agriculture School who Kōsaku claims once killed a bear with his bare hands.
Hajime Menjō (校條 創, Menjō Hajime)
Voiced by: Rikiya Koyama (Japanese); Sean Hennigan (English)
President of Hexa Techs Corporation and the biological father of Kei Kamatori who he bests in a produce selling contest in episode 10. He and Kei had a falling out due to him continuously using chemicals in his farming methods that his wife was terribly sensitive to which contributed to her early death. He is a sharp businessman who Kei claims always has his eye on the bottom line. Unlike his son, he believes that using modern technology in farming produces better results than organically grown goods.

== Media ==
=== Light novel ===
The No-Rin light novel series is written by Shirow Shiratori and illustrated by Kippu, and published by SB Creative under their GA Bunko imprint. Thirteenth volumes were released from August 15, 2011 to October 15, 2016. After a decade long hiatus, a fourteenth and final volume is scheduled to be released on June 13, 2026.

No.	Japanese release date	Japanese ISBN
1	August 15, 2011	978-4-7973-6690-7
2	November 15, 2011	978-4-7973-6811-6
3	March 15, 2012	978-4-7973-6896-3
4	August 11, 2012	978-4-7973-7135-2
5	December 15, 2012	978-4-7973-7252-6
6	April 15, 2013	978-4-7973-7336-3
7	September 14, 2013	978-4-7973-7521-3
8	January 15, 2014	978-4-7973-7657-9; 978-4-7973-7558-9 (LE)
9	July 15, 2014	978-4-7973-7753-8
10	March 14, 2015	978-4-7973-8292-1; 978-4-7973-8233-4 (LE)
11	September 15, 2015	978-4-7973-8499-4
12	March 15, 2016	978-4-7973-8707-0
13	October 15, 2016	978-4-7973-8942-5
14	June 13, 2026	978-4-8156-3969-3; 978-4-8156-3970-9 (LE)

=== Manga ===
The direct manga adaptation illustrated by Maru Asakura and cooperated by Yoko Matsu'ura was serialized on Square Enix's Young Gangan Comics from March 16, 2012 to June 5, 2015. The individual chapters were compiled into eight tankōbon volumes from August 10, 2012 to September 12, 2015.

A second, more comedy focused manga adaptation illustrated by Kotoji, titled No-Rin Petit (のうりん プチ, Nōrin Puchi), was serialized on Square Enix's Monthly Big Gangan from August 24, 2013 to August 25, 2014. Two tankōbon volumes collected the individual chapters.

A third manga adaptation illustrated by Toshiko Machida, titled No-Rin -Wild- (のうりん-野生-＜ガイヤ＞, Nōrin-Yasei (Gaiya)-), was serialized on SB Creative's GA Bunko Magazine from October 17, 2013 to November 27, 2014. The individual chapters were compiled into two tankōbon volumes.

No.	Japanese release date	Japanese ISBN
1	August 10, 2012	978-4-7575-3688-3
2	December 15, 2012	978-4-7575-3811-5
3	April 15, 2013	978-4-7575-3947-1
4	December 25, 2013	978-4-7575-4165-8
5	March 25, 2014	978-4-7575-4239-6
6	July 14, 2014	978-4-7575-4382-9
7	January 24, 2015	978-4-7575-4543-4
8	September 12, 2015	978-4-7575-4733-9

==== No-Rin Petit ====
No.	Japanese release date	Japanese ISBN
1	January 16, 2014	978-4-7575-4198-6
2	August 25, 2014	978-4-7575-4373-7

==== No-Rin -Wild- ====
No.	Japanese release date	Japanese ISBN
1	March 25, 2014	978-4-7973-7658-6
2	November 11, 2014	978-4-7973-8019-4

=== Drama CD ===
A drama CD adaptation was released by HOBiRECORDS on April 27, 2012. Volumes eight and ten of the novel had limited edition releases that each included drama CDs.

=== Anime ===
A 12-episode anime television series adaptation by Silver Link was broadcast in Japan from January 10 to March 29, 2014. The opening theme for the anime is Himitsu no Tobira kara Ai ni Kite (秘密の扉から会いにきて) performed by Ringo Kinoshita (Yukari Tamura) and the ending theme song is Mogitate ♥ Fruit Girls (も・ぎ・た・て♥フルーツガールズ) by Kinoshita (Tamura) and Minori Nakazawa (Kana Hanazawa). In the first episode, the opening theme was Cordless Telephone (コードレス☆照れ☆PHONE; 'Cordless Shy Phone') by Yuka Kusakabe (Tamura / Jad Saxton).

In North America, the series was licensed for English release by Funimation. Crunchyroll also added the series for its streaming service.

==== Episodes ====
No.	Title	Original release date
1	"Chuno Love Story" "Kuriya nō Rabu Sutōrī" (厨脳ラブストーリー)	January 10, 2014
Teen idol Yuka Kusakabe announces her retirement. Kosaku Hata, a student of the Tamo Agricultural School and her biggest fan, is devastated. Soon afterwards new girl Ringo Kinoshita joins their class, only she seems strangely familiar.
2	"The King of Farmers" "Kingu Obu Fāmāzu" (キング・オブ・ファーマーズ)	January 18, 2014
Kosaku shows new girl Ringo around the school and introduces her to childhood friend Minori Nakazawa, best friend Kei Kamatori, pet wallaby Wakadana and large breasted classmate, Kochou Yoshida. During a welcome party, Ringo seems oddly jealous of how close Minori is to Kosaku, at least until an unfortunate laundry room encounter turns into a "best panties" competition.
3	"Super Sub-Mom War: Training Stage" "Sūpā Shūtome Taisen Jisshū-hen" (スーパー姑大戦 実習篇)	January 25, 2014
Kosaku is devastated to find Minori has thrown away all his Yuka Kusakabe merchandise, even his favourite body pillow. Meanwhile, it's Ringo's first day farming with the other students and Minori is determined not to be beaten by an ex idol from the big city.
4	"The Smile You Showed Me" "Kimi ga Miseta Egao" (君が見せた笑顔)	February 1, 2014
Everybody must work together to catch a vegetable thief who has been pilfering from the fields at night. A misunderstanding leads to some embarrassment in Minori's bedroom. Kosaku is concerned that Ringo has not smiled once since arriving at the school, and several attempts are made to remedy this.
5	"Farming's Five Top Four" "Gonin no Shitennō" (五人の四天農)	February 8, 2014
Through a series of unfortunate events Ringo meets three of the schools top farming students, the Yaoi obsessed class rep of the Biotechnology department, Akari "Bio" Suzuku, the forever lonely class rep of the Forestry department, Rintaro "Woodman" Miyamoto, and the strangely effeminate class rep of the Landscaping department, Kaoru "Rose" Hanazono.
6	"Full-Moe Alchemist: Bounty" "Megumi no Renkinjutsushi" (萌（めぐみ）の錬金術師)	February 15, 2014
Kosaku and his friends realise they could sell more produce by using cute girls in their advertising. Thus appears expert money making student Torao "Money" Kanegami. Before long they are swamped with orders for Moe Eggs and erotically shaped mushrooms. Unfortunately, it turns out that this is against school rules, and success is quickly followed by suspensions from class. At least Ringo looks good in a yukata.
7	"Sob Salad" "Gōkyū Sarada" (号泣サラダ)	February 22, 2014
A sudden influx of excess vegetables leads to a sudden increase in body weight among the class. The untimely arrival of mold ruins Ringo's first crop of Soy beans, and drought followed by intense rainfall almost ruins this years tomato harvest. Certain truths are also revealed about Minori's involvement with the vegetables Kosaku sent anonymously to Ringo back when she was an idol.
8	"Cooking Granny" "Kukkingu Baba" (クッキングババ)	March 1, 2014
40 year old class teacher Natsumi Bekki is tired of being single and embarks on a lust fuelled rampage against crops and students alike but is soon foiled by the intervention of Kei and a goat. A great debate has arisen amongst the boys, are large breasts better than small. Meanwhile, Kosaku, Ringo and Miss Bekki host a cooking show for the class that ultimately ends with the inappropriately nyotaimori-clad Miss Bekki being ejected from the room by her exasperated students.
9	"School Swim Trunks" "Gakkō no Kaipan" (学校の海パン)	March 8, 2014
Minori has never once been to the beach, and she is not likely to anytime soon as rain, floods and heavy winds threaten the fields. Nothing a school bus in the right place cannot fix. Now if only Kosaku can focus on his driving instead of Ringo in a swimsuit, Minori may get her day at the beach after all.
10	"Veggie Battle: Ultimate v. Supreme" "Kyūkyoku to Shikō no Yasai Taiketsu!" (究極と至高の野菜対決!)	March 15, 2014
Legendary School Principal Kuwanosuke Naganawa, who once killed a bear using only his hands, is slowly going mad with longing for the "perfect eggplant". Meanwhile, Kei's wealthy father and owner of the Hexa Techs Corporation (Hajime Menjo), challenges Kei to a sales duel. Kei's all organic produce against his chemically enhanced produce. If Kei loses, he must leave his friends and return home with his father to run the company.
11	"Cheerful Farming Village" "Akarui Nōson" (あかるいのうそん)	March 22, 2014
With Kei and Kochou travelling together abroad, Kosaku, Minori and Ringo return to Kosaku and Minori's hometown for summer break, however, a fake pregnancy announcement ends with Kosaku engaged to Minori with the full support of her parents. Could this be a fiendish plot? Either way, Ringo is less than pleased. Meanwhile, where has Wakadana been hiding all this time.
12	"Everybody's No-Rin" "Minna no Nōrin" (みんなののうりん)	March 29, 2014
Kosaku is coerced into going along with a fake wedding for the sake of the future of the village, however, Wakadana's hiding place is revealed at the crucial moment ruining the festive mood. An apologetic and heartfelt speech from Kosaku narrowly saves the day. Now if only he can choose between Ringo and Minori he might just avoid a punch to the face. Everybody returns to school, where Ringo and Minori happily watch Kosaku being chased by the school's mad bull.

== Reception ==
Anime News Network had three editors review the first episode of the anime: Carl Kimlinger found the overarching romance to be "awful" and "cosmically unlikely", and the use of agriculture as a background setting pales in comparison to shows like Moyashimon and Silver Spoon; Rebecca Silverman commended the subtle transformation of Yuka into her alter-ego Ringo but felt the humor was either "not humorous or downright offensive" because of Kosaku and the supporting cast, concluding that the show's fish out of water romance plot has potential but might not be worth waiting after several episodes. The third reviewer, Theron Martin, said about the episode overall: "Technical merits are respectable, including an impressively show series-opening song, but how Ringo is handled going forward is the much more potentially interesting aspect and will ultimately determine the success or failure of the series." Martin reviewed the complete anime series in 2016. He gave praise to the various comedic aspects it delivers along with some heartwarming moments through a "solid but not exceptional visual" palette, but felt that put together it makes for some underwritten storytelling in its "weak and inconsistent love triangle", concluding that: "No-Rin may not come together well, but that does not keep it from being quite entertaining. Be aware going in that it's not as tame as first impressions might suggest and it can be a fun viewing experience."

== See also ==
- The Ryuo's Work Is Never Done!, another light novel series by the same author
- Anti-Magic Academy: The 35th Test Platoon, another light novel series by the same illustrator
