= 86 (novel series) =

Japanese light novel series and its adaptations

- The cover of the first volume of the light novel, featuring Shinei Nouzen (left) and Vladilena Milizé (right)

86-エイティシックス- (Eiti Shikkusu)
- Genre: Mecha; Military science fiction
- Light novel
- Written by: Asato Asato
- Illustrated by: Shirabii
- Published by: ASCII Media Works
- English publisher: NA: Yen Press
- Imprint: Dengeki Bunko
- Original run: February 10, 2017 – present
- Volumes: 14 + 2 side-stories
- Manga
- Written by: Asato Asato
- Illustrated by: Motoki Yoshihara
- Published by: Square Enix
- English publisher: NA: Yen Press
- Magazine: Young Gangan
- Original run: February 16, 2018 – June 2021
- Volumes: 3
- Manga

86: Operation High School
- Written by: Asato Asato
- Illustrated by: Suzume Somemiya
- Published by: Media Factory
- English publisher: NA: Yen Press
- Magazine: Monthly Comic Alive
- Original run: June 27, 2020 – August 27, 2021
- Volumes: 2
- Manga

86: Run Through the Battlefront
- Written by: Asato Asato
- Illustrated by: Hakuya Yamasaki
- Published by: Square Enix
- Magazine: Manga Up!
- Original run: January 24, 2021 – September 2021
- Volumes: 1
- Anime television series
- Directed by: Toshimasa Ishii
- Produced by: Nobuhiro Nakayama; Mayu Miyako; Takao Kiyose
- Written by: Toshiya Ōno
- Music by: Hiroyuki Sawano; Kohta Yamamoto
- Studio: A-1 Pictures
- Licensed by: Crunchyroll; SEA: Muse Communication
- Original network: Tokyo MX, BS11, GYT, GTV, ytv, CTV
- English network: US: Crunchyroll Channel
- Original run: April 11, 2021 – March 19, 2022
- Episodes: 23
- Manga

86: Fragmental Neoteny
- Written by: Asato Asato
- Illustrated by: Shinjo Takuya
- Published by: Media Factory
- Magazine: Monthly Comic Alive
- Original run: April 26, 2021 – October 27, 2022
- Volumes: 3
- Manga

86: Mahō Shōjo Regina Lena – Tatakae! Ginga Kōkō Senkan San Magnolia
- Written by: Asato Asato
- Illustrated by: Suzume Somemiya
- Published by: Media Factory
- Magazine: Monthly Comic Alive
- Original run: March 27, 2023 – February 27, 2025
- Volumes: 2
- icon

86: Eighty Six (Japanese: 86-エイティシックス-, Hepburn: Eiti Shikkusu) is a Japanese science fiction light novel series written by Asato Asato and illustrated by Shirabii. It began publication by ASCII Media Works under their Dengeki Bunko imprint in February 2017. The series is licensed in North America by Yen Press.

A manga adaptation illustrated by Motoki Yoshihara was serialized in Square Enix's seinen manga magazine Young Gangan from February 2018 to June 2021, with three spin-off manga series—86: Operation High School by Suzume Somemiya, 86: Fragmental Neoteny, and 86: Mahō Shōjo Regina Lena – Tatakae! Ginga Kōkō Senkan San Magnolia also by Suzume Somemiya—being serialized in Media Factory's seinen manga magazine Monthly Comic Alive from June 2020 to August 2021, from April 2021 to October 2022, and from March 2023, respectively. An anime television series adaptation produced by A-1 Pictures aired from April 2021 to March 2022.

== Plot ==
The Republic of San Magnolia has been at war with the Empire of Giad for nine years. Though it initially suffered devastating losses to the Empire's autonomous mechanized Legions, the Republic has since developed its own autonomous units, called Juggernauts, which are directed remotely by a Handler. While on the surface, the public believes the war is being fought between machines, in reality, the Juggernauts are being piloted by humans, all of whom are "86"—the designation given to the Colorata minority of San Magnolia. The 86 originally had equal rights, but were persecuted and scapegoated by the dominant Alba race and the Alba-supremacist Republic government to the point where Colorata were both officially designated and popularly considered subhuman. The 86 were not permitted to have personal names and were immured in internment camps in the 86th District (their namesake), all the while being forced to fight in the Republic's war with the Empire to receive better treatment.

Major Vladilena "Lena" Milizé, an Alba noble and military officer in the San Magnolian military, speaks out against the grave mistreatment of the nation's Colorata minority, and the willful deception of the general public by the Republic government. She is assigned as the Handler of the Spearhead Squadron of the Eastern Front: an elite unit composed entirely of 86 veterans who have earned names, in the form of call signs. Led by their squad leader, Shinei Nouzen, "Undertaker", the Spearhead Squadron is infamous among military officials. Its notoriety stems from the state in which its commanding officers (Handlers) presiding over the squad are left to descend into insanity, and some have gone as far as to commit suicide. Lena, an avowed 86 sympathizer, gets to know the Spearhead Squadron in her time as head of the contingent. At the same time, Lena and Shinei learn a dark secret: the Republic and the war with the Empire are not what they seem.

== Characters ==
=== Main characters ===
Shinei Nouzen (シンエイ・ノウゼン, Shin'ei Nōzen) / Undertaker (アンダーテイカー, Andāteikā)
Voiced by: Shōya Chiba, Asuna Tomari (young) (Japanese); Billy Kametz, Aleks Le, (eps. 22–23), Tiana Camacho (young), Alejandro Saab (volume 1–2; audiobook only), Stephen Fu (volume 3–present; audiobook only) (English)
Commonly called as Shin (シン). The leader of the 86 Spearhead Squadron who has fought in and survived countless battles despite only being 16 years old. Nicknamed The Reaper for his habit of keeping a box full of makeshift dogtags crafted out of a small piece of each dead comrade's Juggernaut, which he plans to bury when the war is over. Shin is known for his ruthlessness against both enemies and allies. It is rumored that previous Handlers who have dealt with him have gone insane and left the unit, retired, or even committed suicide for unknown reasons. He develops romantic feelings for Lena throughout the series.
Vladilena Milizé (ヴラディレーナ・ミリーゼ, Vuradirēna Mirīze)
Voiced by: Ikumi Hasegawa (Japanese); Suzie Yeung (English)
Commonly called Lena (レーナ, Rēna). An officer in the San Magnolian military who got promoted to Major at just 16 years old thanks to a mixture of her skills and family connections. Lena has a habit of treating her 86 subordinates like humans, unlike other Handlers who treat the 86 as disposable objects. Lena is the newly-assigned Handler of the Republic's "Spearhead" squadron.
Frederica Rosenfort (フレデリカ・ローゼンフォルト, Furederika Rōzenforuto)
Voiced by: Misaki Kuno (Japanese); Kimberley Anne Campbell (English)
The ten-year-old adopted sister of the surviving Spearhead Squadron members through Ernst. Her real name is Augusta Frederica Adel-Adler (アウグスタ・フレデリカ・アデルアドラー, Augusuta Furederika Aderuadorā), the royal princess of the Giad Empire and the royal family's sole survivor before the empire collapsed. Upset with the Giad Empire's ruthlessness in the war, Frederica defected to the eventually Giad Federacy, where unlike her parents her life was spared by the new government. Her family has the ability to see the past and present of anyone she meets, and she quickly becomes close to Shin because he reminds her of her knight, Kiriya. After the Spearhead survivors go back to Officer School, she joins them as their "mascot" in order to assist them with killing Kiriya's Shepherd form, occasionally using her power and intelligence to provide minor tactical support.

=== Spearhead Squadron survivors ===
Spearhead (スピアヘッド, Supiaheddo) Squadron is a San Magnolia military unit that supposedly consists of the most elite 86 soldiers on the battlefield. In reality, it is a squad for any 86 that is deemed to have swaying power and charisma, with the intention of putting them through dangerous missions in the hopes that they will be killed off. If they fail to be killed towards the end of their supposed service time, they will then be put on a suicide mission that tends to eliminate the entire squad, which is subsequently replaced by new squad members. Any survivors are forced to defect and leave San Magnolia, but aside from Shin and the four other survivors from his group, they tended to all be killed by the Legion.

After defecting from San Magnolia, the five survivors are taken in by the Giad Federacy and are adopted by Ernst, becoming siblings. They eventually become part of the Nordlicht Squadron under the command of Grethe Wenzel and alongside Frederica. Following the defeat of Kiriya, they are then assembled as the "Eighty-Sixth Strike Package" under Lena's command.

Raiden Shuga (ライデン・シュガ, Raiden Shuga) / Wehrwolf (ヴェアヴォルフ, Veavorufu)
Voiced by: Seiichiro Yamashita (Japanese); Jonah Scott (English)
The Executive Officer and vice-captain of the Spearhead Squadron. A friend of Shin before they joined the same squad. After settling in the Giad Federacy, he takes up work with a moving crew.
Theoto Rikka (セオト・リッカ, Seoto Rikka) / Laughing Fox (ラフィングフォックス, Rafingu Fokkusu)
Voiced by: Natsumi Fujiwara (Japanese); Casey Mongillo (English)
Known by his nickname Theo (セオ, Seo). His callsign was inspired by an Alba commander who sacrificed himself to save Theo's unit. Theo is often blunt and sarcastic when dealing with others, especially their Handlers. He initially gives Lena a hard time, but comes to regret this after being lectured by Raiden following an outburst. Theo keeps a sketchbook that he draws in on his spare time, and designed several of the squadron's personal marks on their Juggernauts.
Anju Emma (アンジュ・エマ, Anju Ema) / Snow Witch (スノウウィッチ, Sunō Witchi)
Voiced by: Saori Hayami (Japanese); Maureen Price (English)
A very soft spoken and kind member. Anju is an Alba on her father's side, and her mixed-race heritage (which also birthed her callsign because of her light-colored hair) resulted in her being beaten and abused by both the Alba and 86, leading to scars on her back. She eventually grew her hair out to hide the scars. After settling in the Giad Federacy, she begins pursuing her passion for cooking.
Kurena Kukumila (クレナ・ククミラ, Kurena Kukumira) / Gunslinger (ガンスリンガー, Gansuringā)
Voiced by: Sayumi Suzushiro (Japanese); Erica Mendez (English)
An active and caring girl. She is said to have suffered the most at the hands of Alba amongst all of Spearhead Squadron, as her parents were murdered by Alba soldiers in the past and her sister was conscripted into another 86 unit and also killed. As a result, she carries intense hatred against all Albas, coupled with protective instincts for her fellow 86s. Kurena has a large crush on Shin, but he realizes that she does so out of admiration for his darker protective instincts instead of because of who he is and needs to be, and values her only as a sister. Kurena subsequently dislikes Lena both because of her race and the romance she forms with Shin, but eventually grows to care for Lena and accepts their relationship. She is the sniper of the group, hence her callsign. After settling in the Giad Federacy, she begins to express interest in fashion.

=== San Magnolia ===
==== Civilians ====
Henrietta "Annette" Penrose (アンリエッタ・ペンローズ, Anrietta Penrōzu)
Voiced by: Riho Sugiyama (Japanese); Morgan Lauré (English)
One of Lena's few friends in the San Magnolia military. She works in the Research Division, specializing in the "Para-RAID" device that allows Handlers to instantly connect with the 86 combatants under their command. The device was partially created by her late father. It is revealed she is Shin's childhood friend and that she still feels guilty for not helping him and his family when the war began, but hides behind a mask of apathy which strains the relationship between her and Lena.
Lev Aldrecht (レフ・アルドレヒト, Refu Arudorehito)
Voiced by: Taiten Kusunoki (Japanese); Imari Williams (English)
An engineer for the Spearhead squadron. It is revealed that he is an Alba; his wife and daughter were 86, so he dyed his hair and was enlisted as a volunteer to get their rights back (not that the Republic would ever do so). Despite seeming like an irate man, he cares for the remaining squad members and those who come after them. He constantly scolds Shin for his reckless fighting which constantly damages his rig. He dies during the large scale offensive protecting young processors. He asks Shin if his wife and daughter are among the legion, and Shin tells him they are not. However, in his final moments, Lev wanted to avenge his family and his comrades, the 86. This led him to willingly join the Legion and take revenge on the Republic.

==== Military ====
Jérôme Karlstahl (ジェローム・カールシュタール, Jerōmu Kārushutāru)
Voiced by: Satoshi Mikami (Japanese); Bob Carter (English)
A Colonel in the San Magnolia military and a friend of Lena's father. While he cares for Lena like a niece, he at his core is a pessimist and has long been consumed by despair at the situation of the Republic. He believes that the republic deserves to be destroyed for its inhumane crimes against the 86, including himself for standing by and allowing it as a member of the military, as such he continues to perform what is required of him until his end comes. Despite falling out with Lena due to their differing states of mind he continues to watch over her from the side lines and later egging her on to make her dream a reality as he protects her by going out to face the legion. In his final moments he reveals he believes in Lena completely as he ends his own life while facing an old friend among the Legion.
Shiden Iida (シデン・イーダ, Shiden Īda) / Cyclops (サイクロプス, Saikuropusu)
Voiced by: Asuna Tomari (Japanese); Rebeka Thomas (English)
The leader of the Brísingamen Squadron that Lena commands after the Spearhead Squadron was ended. Shiden's nickname is derived from her heterochromatic eyes that led to her being abused even by other 86 in their internment camp. She has a strained relationship with Shin, they do not get along personally at all but respect each others' abilities and trust each other in battle.
Dustin Jaeger (ダスティン・イェーガー, Dasutin Iēgā) / Sagittarius (サギタリウス, Sagitarius)
An Alba and new member of the squadron who volunteered after growing tired of the blatant hypocrisy of his people, citing how he and his family, immigrants from the Empire, were never branded traitors due to being Alba, whereas his entire class, comprising many races, was branded traitors and 86, dying in the decade-long legion war. He has feelings for Anju who he confesses to; though she considers him important to her she has yet to fully answer him, due to her lingering feelings for the deceased Daiya.
Alice Araish (アリス・アライシュ, Arisu Araishu)
The former captain of the Halberd Squadron who died in battle 5 years prior to the story. In the prequel story she was somewhat a big sister figure to Shin who was on his first Squadron with her. She was also the original owner of Shin's scarf, who became his primary motivation to carry the fragments of his fallen comrades.
Isuka (イスカ) / Vulture (ヴァルチャー, Varuchā)
The former captain of the Stiletto Squadron who died in battle 5 years prior to the story. He took on the mentor role of Shin when he was in his squadron, presumably after Alice's Squadron fell. He was also the original owner of Shin's gun, who gave to the latter to end his suffering after being mortally wounded in his final moments while giving advice to save the last bullet for himself.

=== Giad Federacy ===
==== Civilians ====
Ernst Zimmerman (エルンスト・ツィマーマン, Erunsuto Tsimāman)
Voiced by: Yūya Uchida (Japanese); Keith Silverstein (English)
The Provisional President of the new Federacy that overthrew the Empire. A kindly old man, his regrets over the murder of the entire Giad imperial family lead him to pursue an altruistic worldview at all costs, refusing to leave any human behind in the fight for the Legion and avoiding any and all underhanded methods that the Empire or San Magnolia were more privy to employ. As a result, he takes Frederica and the surviving members of Shin's squadron as his adopted children.
Nina Rantz (ニーナ・ランツ, Nīna Rantsu)
Voiced by: Madoka Asahina (Japanese); Abby Espiritu (English)
Eugene's sister, who befriends Shin and Frederica at the library.

==== Military ====
Grethe Wenzel (グレーテ・ヴェンツェル, Gurēte Ventseru)
Voiced by: Kana Ueda (Japanese); Amanda Lee (English)
The leader of the Federacy's Nordlicht Commandment where the Spearhead survivors are under her command. She is nicknamed "Spider Woman" due to her obsessiveness of using the Reginleifs; an improved prototype of the Republic's Juggernauts. Grethe has a huge aversion to child soldiers, and thus makes numerous attempts to help Spearhead move on from the war, but eventually grows to respect their desires. She had a fiancé that was killed by the Legion. After the Spearhead survivors leave the Nordlicht Squadron, she continues to be their commander by acting as the Eighty-Sixth Strike Package's liaison to the rest of the Giad military, with Lena reporting directly to her.
Eugene Rantz (ユージン・ランツ, Yūjin Rantsu)
Voiced by: Atsushi Tamaru (Japanese); Howard Wang (English)
Nina's older brother, and the first person Shin befriended after his citizenship. He joins the rest of the Spearhead survivors at Officer School. Eugene was mercy-killed by Shin after a Legion attack.

=== Legion's Shepherds ===
Shourei Nouzen (ショーレイ・ノウゼン, Shōrei Nōzen)
Voiced by: Makoto Furukawa (Japanese); Robbie Daymond (English)
Shin's older brother who saved Lena from a Legion unit. Shourei felt powerless as to not protecting fellow 86s including his parents. In a fit of murderous rage, he strangled Shin and blamed everything on his brother. His head was taken in Shin's first year as a Processor, and was turned into a Shepherd by the Legion. During Spearhead's Special Recon mission, Shourei led a battalion of Legions to eliminate the remaining Juggernauts. Shourei died at the hands of Shin, allowing the latter to finally come to terms with his brother's death.
Kiriya Nouzen (キリヤ・ノウゼン, Kiriya Nōzen)
Voiced by: Yūto Uemura (Japanese); Zeno Robinson (English)
Kiriya is a descendant of the Nouzen family, and was Frederica's Imperial Knight. During the war, he killed a lot of people for the sake of Frederica and the Giad Empire. This turn of behaviour scared Frederica, so she faked her death to escape to the Giad Federacy. However, this sent Kiriya over the edge, and he willingly became the Shepherd commander "Pale Rider".
Václav Milizé (ヴァーツラフ・ミリーゼ, Vātsurafu Mirīze)
Voiced by: Masaki Terasoma (Japanese); Brook Chalmers (season 1), Doug Stone (season 2) (English)
Lena's father, and a Colonel in the San Magnolian military. One of the first to speak out against the treatment of the 86, he took Lena to an internment camp when she was young so that she could be shaped to one day help the 86 when she got older. During this visit, however, Vaclav was killed by the Legion. Unbeknownst to everyone at the time, Vaclav became a Shepherd and ultimately the Legion's supreme commander, "No Face".

=== Deceased members of the Spearhead Squadron ===
Kaie Taniya (カイエ・タニヤ, Kaie Taniya) / Kirschblüte (キルシュブルート, Kirushuburūto)
Voiced by: Haruka Shiraishi (Japanese); Jenny Yokobori (English)
Kaie is one of the oldest active members of the Spearhead squadron, who enjoys teasing her fellow teammates. She was killed in battle after her Juggernaut gets trapped in soft terrain and destroyed by enemy fire.
Daiya Irma (ダイヤ・イルマ, Daiya Iruma) / Black Dog (ブラックドグ, Burraku Dogu)
Voiced by: Haruki Ishiya (Japanese); Alejandro Saab (English)
A friend of Anju who alternates between being compassionate and awkward. It was implied that they had feelings towards each other. He was mercy killed by Shin to thwart the Legion's plan to create more Black Sheep.
Haruto Keats (ハルト・キーツ, Haruto Kītsu) / Falke (ファルケ, Faruke)
Voiced by: Daiki Yamashita (Japanese); Erik Scott Kimerer (English)
A boisterous and somewhat lecherous member, however he does become serious when needed. He died prior to Spearhead's Special Recon mission.
Kujo Niko (クジョー・ニコ, Kujō Niko)
Voiced by: Taishi Murata (Japanese); Mark Allen, Jr. (English)
One of the Spearhead Squadron members who is mercy-killed by Shinei after an early battle leaves him crippled and bleeding out.
Rui Kino (ルイ・キノ) / Fafnir (ファフニール, Fafunīru)
Voiced by: Shinei Ueki (Japanese); Kevin Thelwell (English)
Chise Osen (チセ・オーセン, Chise Ōsen) / Griffin (グリフィン, Gurifin)
Voiced by: Masamu Ono (Japanese); Kevin Thelwell (English)
Toma Sobi (トーマ・ソービ, Tōma Sōbi) / Helianthus (ヘリアンサス, Heriansus)
Voiced by: Katsumi Fukuhara
Tozan Sasha (トウザン・サシャ, Tōzan Sasha)
Voiced by: Taito Ban
Lecca Lin (レッカ・リン, Rekka Rin) / Burnt Tayl (バーントテール, Bānto Tēru)
Voiced by: Shizuka Ishigami (Japanese); Kristen McGuire (English)
A female member of the squad. She committed suicide after her Juggernaut malfunctioned and before a Legion unit killed her.
Mikuri Kairo (ミクリ・カイロゥ, Mikuri Kairō) / Leukosia (ロイコシア, Roikoshia)
Voiced by: Yuka Nukui (Japanese); Tiana Camacho (English)
Maina Atomika (マイナ・ヤトミカ, Maina Yatomika)
Voiced by: Mayuko Kazama (Japanese); Emi Lo (English)

== Production ==
One of the inspirations for the series was drone warfare, and the novel explores the logistics and ethics around this form of combat. Another major inspiration was the 2007 film The Mist. As she came up with the fictional ideas of the story, Asato started working on the light novel. Asato had been working on the novel since 2014 and it was only in 2017 that it was published. The setting of the story took a while for the author to come up with. She wanted the story to take place within a fortressed city. However, she switched the idea and finalized the current setting for the series. She usually spends about 6–8 hours a day writing.

== Media ==
=== Light novels ===
The light novels are written by Asato Asato and are illustrated by Shirabii, with mechanical design by I-IV. ASCII Media Works has published fourteen volumes since February 2017 under their Dengeki Bunko imprint. The light novels are licensed in North America by Yen Press, which has published 13 volumes as of December 10, 2024. The English version was translated by Roman Lempert.

No.	Title	Original release date	English release date
1	Eighty-Six; Eiti Shikkusu (エイティシックス)	February 10, 2017; 978-4-04-892666-9	March 26, 2019; 978-1-9753-0312-9
2	Run Through the Battlefront (Start); Ran Surū Za Batorufuronto〈Jō〉 (ラン・スルー・ザ・バトルフロント 〈上〉)	July 7, 2017; 978-4-04-893232-5	July 23, 2019; 978-1-9753-0314-3
3	Run Through the Battlefront (Finish); Ran Surū Za Batorufuronto〈Ge〉 (ラン・スルー・ザ・バトルフロント 〈下〉)	December 9, 2017; 978-4-04-893397-1	November 19, 2019; 978-1-9753-0311-2
4	Under Pressure; Andā Puresshā (アンダー・プレッシャー)	May 10, 2018; 978-4-04-893830-3	March 31, 2020; 978-1-9753-0316-7
5	Death, Be Not Proud; Shi yo, Ogoru nakare (死よ、驕るなかれ)	October 10, 2018; 978-4-04-912092-9	August 18, 2020; 978-1-9753-9925-2
6	Darkest Before the Dawn; Akeneba Koso Yoru wa Nagaku (明けねばこそ夜は永く)	April 10, 2019; 978-4-04-912461-3	November 17, 2020; 978-1-9753-1451-4
7	Mist; Misuto (ミスト)	September 10, 2019; 978-4-04-912798-0	March 30, 2021; 978-1-9753-2074-4
8	Gun Smoke On the Water; Gansumōku On Za Wōtā (ガンスモーク・オン・ザ・ウォーター)	May 9, 2020; 978-4-04-913185-7	August 24, 2021; 978-1-9753-2076-8
9	Valkyrie Has Landed; Varukiryi Hazu Randeddo (ヴァルキリィ・ハズ・ランデッド)	February 10, 2021; 978-4-04-913309-7	February 22, 2022; 978-1-9753-4000-1
10	Fragmental Neoteny; Furagumentaru Neotenī (フラグメンタル・ネオテニー)	June 10, 2021; 978-4-04-913880-1	May 17, 2022; 978-1-9753-4334-7
11	Dies Passionis; Diesu Pashionisū (ディエス・パシオニスー)	February 10, 2022; 978-4-04-914149-8	November 22, 2022; 978-1-9753-4996-7
12	Holy Blue Bullet; Hōryi Burū Buretto (ホーリィ・ブルー・ブレットー)	February 10, 2023; 978-4-0491-4396-6	November 21, 2023; 978-1-9753-7347-4
13	Dear Hunter; Dia Hantā (ディア・ハンター)	January 10, 2024; 978-4-04-915071-1	December 10, 2024; 979-8-8554-0829-4
14	Paint It Black; Peinto Itto Burakku (ペイント・イット・ブラック)	September 10, 2025; 978-4-04-916184-7	December 8, 2026; 979-8-8554-3824-6

==== Alter ====
A secondary series called Alter serving as collections of various sidestories written for the main series began publishing on April 7, 2023. The Alter series was licensed by Yen Press at Sakura-Con on March 29, 2024.

No.	Title	Original release date	English release date
1	The Reaper's Occasional Adolescence; Shinigami Tokidoki Seishun (死神ときどき青春)	April 7, 2023; 978-4-0491-4987-6	September 24, 2024; 978-1-9753-9270-3
2	Fight, Magical Girl Reina Lena! Go, Galactic Battleship San Magnolia! Mahō Shōjo Rejīna Rēna: Tatakae! Ginga Kōkō Senkan San Magunoria (魔法少女レジーナ☆レーナ～戦え! 銀河航行戦艦サンマグノリア～)	January 10, 2025; 978-4-0491-5789-5	March 10, 2026; 979-8-8554-2451-5

=== Manga ===
A manga adaptation by Motoki Yoshihara was serialized in Square Enix's seinen manga magazine Young Gangan from February 16, 2018, to June 2021. On July 6, 2022, it was announced the manga was cancelled due to Yoshihara's health issues. Its chapters were collected in three tankōbon volumes. It has been licensed in North America by Yen Press.

No.	Original release date	Original ISBN	English release date	English ISBN
1	October 10, 2018	978-4-7575-5870-0	December 15, 2020	978-1-9753-1917-5
2	September 10, 2019	978-4-7575-6278-3	March 30, 2021	978-1-9753-1925-0
3	June 10, 2021	978-4-7575-7307-9	October 4, 2022	978-1-9753-4956-1

A spin-off manga series titled 86: Operation High School by Suzume Somemiya was serialized in Media Factory's seinen manga magazine Monthly Comic Alive from June 27, 2020, to August 27, 2021. Its chapters have been collected in two volumes. The spin-off is licensed by Yen Press, and was released as a single omnibus volume.

No.	Original release date	Original ISBN	English release date	English ISBN
1	January 21, 2021	978-4-04-680006-0	November 5, 2024	978-1-9753-7701-4
2	September 22, 2021	978-4-04-680538-6	November 5, 2024	978-1-9753-7701-4

A third manga titled 86: Run Through the Battlefront by Hakuya Yamasaki was serialized in Square Enix's Manga UP! app from January 24 to September 2021. On July 6, 2022, it was announced the manga was cancelled due to Yamasaki's health issues. Its chapters were collected in one volume, published on June 10, 2021.

No.	Japanese release date	Japanese ISBN
1	June 10, 2021	978-4-7575-7308-6

A prequel manga series titled 86: Fragmental Neoteny was serialized in Monthly Comic Alive from April 26, 2021, to October 27, 2022. It was collected in three volumes, with the third volume released as an ebook only.

No.	Japanese release date	Japanese ISBN
1	September 22, 2021	978-4-04-680903-2
2	June 22, 2022	978-4-04-681229-2
3	December 22, 2022	—

A magical girl spin-off manga by Suzume Somemiya, titled 86: Mahō Shōjo Regina Lena – Tatakae! Ginga Kōkō Senkan San Magnolia was serialized in Media Factory's Monthly Comic Alive magazine from March 27, 2023, to February 27, 2025. It was collected in two volumes.

No.	Japanese release date	Japanese ISBN
1	March 28, 2024	978-4-0468-1353-4
2	March 28, 2025	978-4-0481-1447-9

=== Anime ===
An anime television series adaptation was announced in a livestream commemorating the first anniversary of Kadokawa's "Kimirano" light novel website on March 15, 2020. It is produced by A-1 Pictures and directed by Toshimasa Ishii, with Toshiya Ōno writing the scripts, Tetsuya Kawakami designing the characters, and Hiroyuki Sawano and Kohta Yamamoto composing the music. The CGI will be developed by Shirogumi. The series was originally scheduled to air in 2020, but it was indefinitely delayed. The series is a split-cour anime, with the first half airing on Tokyo MX and other stations from April 11 to June 20, 2021. (Note: The series premiered on April 10, 2021 at 24:00 (effectively, April 11 at 12:00 a.m. JST).) On March 28, 2021, Tokyo MX broadcast a special program commemorating the start of the series starring main cast members Shōya Chiba and Ikumi Hasegawa, producer Nobuhiro Nakayama and music composer Hiroyuki Sawano. The second half aired from October 3, 2021, to March 19, 2022. The first opening theme is "3-pun 29-byō" (3分29秒, San-pun Nijūkyū-byō; lit. '3 Minutes 29 Seconds') by Hitorie, while the first ending theme is "Avid" by SawanoHiroyuki[nZk]:mizuki and the second theme is "Hands Up to the Sky" by SawanoHiroyuki[nZk]:Laco. The second opening theme is "Kyōkaisen" (境界線; lit. 'Boundary Line') by Amazarashi, while the third ending theme is "Alchemilla" (ルケミラ, Arukemira) by Regal Lily and the fourth ending theme is "LilaS" by SawanoHiroyuki[nZk]:Honoka Takahashi.

Crunchyroll streamed the series outside of Asia. Muse Communication licensed the series in Southeast Asia.

== Reception ==
=== Novels ===
The light novel won the Grand Prize at the 23rd Dengeki Novel Prize award in 2016. The light novel also ranked second in 2018 in Takarajimasha's annual light novel guide book Kono Light Novel ga Sugoi!, in the bunkobon category. It ranked fifth in 2019.

Joe Ballard of Comic Book Resources noted the light novel's critical acclaim and called it "a movingly honest portrayal of war, drama, the supernatural, and the shockingly discriminatory views of a nation's general public, 86-Eighty-Six is anything but your standard light novel series." UK Anime News praised the first volume of the light novel, calling it thought-provoking, emotional and incredibly difficult to put down." The Fandom Post found the first volume "not particularly groundbreaking", but was impressed by the subversion of the "bloodless war" theme and found the development of the plot and characters "quite solid."

=== Anime ===
IGN listed the show as one of the best anime of 2021. Multiple writers from Anime News Network listed the anime's first season as one of their favorite series from spring 2021, with Steve Jones also naming the second season as his most anticipated for fall 2021.

The Fandom Post gave the show an A−, noting that although the first episode felt stiff and full of "technobabble", the show found its footing by episode two. At the close of season one, the site praised the show's stellar production value, solid animation and music, and beautiful conveyance of its themes. Callum May's review for Anime News Network also noted the series' improvement by episode two, describing the first few episodes as "surprisingly gripping", and offered specific praise for the show's directing, storyboarding, and animation.

The anime entry in The Encyclopedia of Science Fiction calls it "a very good example of thoughtful and action-packed Military SF, with the bleak first season being the stand-out".

The anime was nominated at the 6th Crunchyroll Anime Awards in five categories: Anime of the Year, Best Girl (Vladilena Milizé), Best Drama, Best Score (Hiroyuki Sawano and Kohta Yamamoto), and Best Voice Artist Performance – Portuguese (Hannah Buttel as Vladilena Milizé). It was again nominated for Best Drama while Geneviève Doang's performance as Vladilena Milizé was one of the nominees for Best Voice Artist Performance (French) at the seventh edition.
