= Asato Asato =

Japanese novelist

Asato Asato 安里アサト
- Born: 1985 (age 40–41)
- Occupation: Light novelist
- Writing career
- Language: Japanese
- Period: 2017–present
- Genres: Light novel, science fiction
- Notable work: 86 -Eighty Six- series
- Notable awards: 23rd Dengeki Novel Prize

Asato Asato (安里アサト; born 1984) is a female Japanese novelist. The pen name Asato Asato is a combination of her real name (Toru Asakura) and eighty-eight.

== Career ==
Asato started writing novels just before she entered junior high school.

She initially submitted her work to the Kadokawa Beans Bunko Rookie Award, but when in 2014 her manuscript made it to the third round of the 2014 21st Dengeki Novel Prize, Asato started thinking about writing a novel that was "Dengeki Novel-esque." This novel would become the start of the 86 -Eighty Six- series.

In 2016, 86 -Eighty Six- won the 23rd Dengeki Novel Prize.

== Bibliography ==
- 86 -Eighty Six- series (86-エイティシックス-) (Illustrated by Shirabii, published by Dengeki Bunko, 14 volumes.
