= The Ryuo's Work Is Never Done! =

Japanese light novel series and its adaptations

- Light novel first volume cover featuring Ai Hinatsuru (left) and Yaichi Kuzuryū (right)

りゅうおうのおしごと! (Ryūō no Oshigoto!)
- Genre: Comedy
- Light novel
- Written by: Shirow Shiratori
- Illustrated by: Shirabii
- Published by: SB Creative
- English publisher: BookWalker (vol. 1-18); J-Novel Club
- Imprint: GA Bunko
- Original run: September 15, 2015 – July 17, 2026
- Volumes: 21 (+6 extra)
- Manga
- Written by: Shirow Shiratori
- Illustrated by: Kogetaokoge
- Published by: Square Enix
- Magazine: Young Gangan
- Original run: October 2, 2015 – August 2, 2019
- Volumes: 10
- Anime television series
- Directed by: Shinsuke Yanagi
- Produced by: Shinji Ōmori; Aya Iizuka; Yoshiyuki Shioya; Fumihiro Ozawa; Fumikazu Satō; Sōichirō Kunimitsu
- Written by: Fumihiko Shimo
- Music by: Kenji Kawai
- Studio: Project No.9
- Licensed by: Crunchyroll
- Original network: AT-X, Tokyo MX, KBS, Sun TV, BS Fuji, MTV
- English network: SEA: Animax Asia
- Original run: January 8, 2018 – March 26, 2018
- Episodes: 12

The Ryuo's Work Is Never Done! (Japanese: りゅうおうのおしごと!, Hepburn: Ryūō no Oshigoto!; lit. "The Ryuo's Work!") is a Japanese light novel series written by Shirow Shiratori and illustrated by Shirabii. SB Creative published the series from September 2015 under their GA Bunko label, with twenty volumes published as of July 2025. A manga adaptation with art by Kogetaokoge was serialized in Square Enix's seinen manga magazine Young Gangan from 2015 to 2019, and was collected in ten tankōbon volumes. A 12-episode anime television series adaptation by Project No.9 aired from January to March 2018.

== Plot ==
Yaichi Kuzuryū is a prodigy shogi player who won the title of Ryūō at the age of 16. Following his victory, he has been in a slump until he is approached by Ai Hinatsuru, a nine-year-old elementary school girl who begs him to make her his disciple. Astonished by Ai's potential, Yaichi agrees to become her master, and the two then brace themselves together in the world of shogi with their friends and rivals. However, this comes with the condition imposed by Ai's mother that Yaichi is to marry Ai if she does not become a major player before graduating middle school.

== Characters ==
Yaichi Kuzuryū (九頭竜 八一, Kuzuryū Yaichi)
Voiced by: Yuma Uchida
The main protagonist of the series. Yaichi is a sixteen-year-old who won the Ryūō title match at a young age. He is the current youngest Ryūō. Initially, he was overwhelmed by his title and perceived pressure to avoid playing in a "disgraceful" manner. He has a calm personality and often doesn't take things seriously unless they are related to shogi. He was taken aback by Ai's talent and determination, and the way she continues to fight and seek a way to victory has helped inspire him. Yaichi is often wrongly accused of being a lolicon due to the affection he gains from young girls like Ai and her friends Mio, Ayano, and Charlotte in her shogi training group. Despite their affections for him, he is oblivious to their true feelings for him. Yaichi tries to be a good master to his disciples and does his best to teach the easiest steps so that his disciples can catch on quickly. He seems to have feelings for Keika as seen in some episodes of the anime. His play style basically sticks with Static Rook, famous for using Sente's Double Wing Attack and Gote's Tempo Loss Bishop Exchange strategies.
While sometimes it is misunderstood that his name "Yaichi" refers to the eighty-one koma on the shogi board, it actually refers to his birthday, August 1. He is sometimes called as Kuzu-Ryūō (クズ竜王, Kuzuryūō; lit. "Scrap-Ryūō", "Scrap-Dragon King") in the story. Starting from Volume 6, it is implied that stunned by the talent of Yaichi after his 4–3 comeback victory against the Meijin from a 0–3 deficit, the players in Kantō, the east side of Japan, start calling him with a new nickname, which in the story is deliberately hidden from readers as something-"King", and also not known by Yaichi himself because he avoids reading the comments about him on the Internet. The nickname is finally revealed to readers at the very end of Volume 12.
Ginko Sora (空 銀子, Sora Ginko)
Voiced by: Hisako Kanemoto
Yaichi's childhood friend and fellow disciple. Ginko is sharp-tongued, brash, and shows no mercy to her opponents in shogi. She is fourteen years old and considered the most talented female player in the shogi history, one of few with enough talent to potentially enter the main shogi league as a full-fledged professional rather than a professional in the women's league. Ginko currently holds an impressive undefeated record at 47 wins against female pros earning her the name "The Snow White of Naniwa". She became a disciple before Yaichi despite being two years younger than him. She never entered the women's league and continues to pursue the main Japan Shogi Association, and is implied to have done this to pursue Yaichi himself. Though not a female professional, she still holds the Queen and Female Gyokuza (lit. "Throne") titles. Despite her aggressive attitude towards Yaichi, Ginko cares deeply about and has feelings for him, though she is hesitant to show it. In Volume 11, Yaichi confesses to Ginko and she reciprocates his feelings. He brings her to his hometown and confesses to her under the stunning starry night there because that scenery is what he first thought of when he first met her and knew her name. (Note: The Japanese of Milky Way is 銀河 (Ginga; lit. "Silver River").)
Ai Hinatsuru (雛鶴 あい, Hinatsuru Ai)
Voiced by: Rina Hidaka
Yaichi's first disciple, a nine-year-old third grader. She is a cheerful girl with extreme talent for shogi, as well as the daughter of the owners of a large and popular inn which has been the site for major matches in Ishikawa. She holds great admiration for Yaichi for his determination and refusal to give up after witnessing his Ryūō match. She first met an exhausted Yaichi during his previous Ryūō title match, where after rejuvenating him with a glass of water, Yaichi promised to grant her any wish if he won. Three months after the title match, she ran away from home to become Yaichi's disciple. Initially accepted as a temporary disciple over spring break, her parents tried to bring her home claiming concerns about the stability of life as a female professional. She failed their conditions to continue her discipleship, but Yaichi was sufficiently impressed by her determination and performance under great pressure. Afterwards he personally requests to take her on, even accepting the condition that, if she fails to claim a title before graduating junior high, he would marry her and inherit the inn. She is exceptionally possessive of Yaichi and occasionally demonstrates yandere traits. In shogi, she is extremely good at tsume shogi, which is why her style places so much emphasis on the late game. Besides, her style is primarily "offensive", focused on finding ways to press the attack.
Ai Yashajin (夜叉神 天衣, Yashajin Ai)
Voiced by: Ayane Sakura
Yaichi's second disciple, also nine years old and in the third grade. She has been living with her wealthy grandfather since her parents' deaths. Her father was a skilled amateur shogi player who'd met a younger Yaichi years ago while having an exhibition match against the Meijin. After Yaichi found a path that would have given him a checkmate, Ai's father had suggested that Yaichi someday take his daughter as a disciple, to which he agreed. She was frustrated to see that he does not remember her father, who'd never stopped admiring him, but eventually accepted his request to make her his disciple. She is very proud and prone to display tsundere traits.
Her shogi style is opposite to Ai's, showing a deep understanding of the early game and a strong insight into "defensive" play, based on traps and counterattacks. The way her style complements Ai Hinatsuru's is part of the reason that Yaichi felt she'd make a great rival for her. Besides, she is good at using Gote's Tempo Loss Bishop Exchange, which, together with her "defensive" play style, are the influences by her master, Yaichi. Yaichi gained so much respect from her father that she learned from Yaichi's every kifu her father could acquire before she really meet Yaichi.
Keika Kiyotaki (清滝 桂香, Kiyotaki Keika)
Voiced by: Ai Kayano
Yaichi and Ginko's elder disciple and biological daughter of their master. She entered the training association to attempt to become a female professional at the age of ten. At twenty-five, she is rapidly approaching the maximum age at which one can become a professional or female professional, a fact that is frequently demonstrated to cause a great deal of pressure for her. She is noted to be quite skilled when she relaxes, but still has a tendency to fall back into the standard basics and freeze up when opponents step out of common patterns.
Ayumu Kannabe (神鍋 歩夢, Kannabe Ayumu; lit. "God-cauldron Step-dream")
Voiced by: Nobuhiko Okamoto
Yaichi's best friend and two years older than him. He is same level as talented as Yaichi in shogi and called as the "Next Meijin" for his fast promotions in the Japan Shogi Association. He is prone to display chūnibyō traits, for example, calling himself as "God Cauldron" instead of Kannabe, and referring the rival relationship between him and Yaichi as the war between a holy knight and a demon king.
Mio Mizukoshi (水越 澪, Mizukoshi Mio)
Voiced by: Yurika Kubo
A friend of Ai's from the training group.
Ayano Sadatō (貞任 綾乃, Sadatō Ayano)
Voiced by: Chinami Hashimoto
A friend of Ai's from the training group.
Charlotte Izoard (シャルロット・イゾアール, Sharurotto Izoāru)
Voiced by: Yui Ogura
A friend of Ai's from the training group, who is six years old. A first grader attending a French school in Kyoto, she speaks with a childish, uneasy Japanese. She starts to be interested in shogi because of Naruto. Yaichi finds himself frequently overwhelmed by her cuteness, much to Ai's chagrin. She studies under the same master as Ayano. Not wanting to hurt Charlotte's feelings when he refused to switch and become her master, Yaichi offered to make her his "bride" instead. While this was successful in avoiding trauma from his rejection, her repeated mention of this "proposal" has caused some trouble for him. She seems to have an interest in Yaichi as seen in the anime.
Takashi Hinatsuru (雛鶴 隆, Hinatsuru Takashi)
Voiced by: Ichirou Mizuki
Ai's father and Akina's husband. Having married into his wife's family, he is unable to contradict her.
Akina Hinatsuru (雛鶴 亜希奈, Hinatsuru Akina)
Voiced by: Mitsuko Horie
Ai's mother and Takashi's wife, and proprietor of a prestigious inn. She attempts to prevent Ai from pursuing a shogi career claiming concern over the stability of such a life. When her daughter failed to satisfy her requirements she attempted to take her back home, but relented and accepted Yaichi's personal request to take her as a disciple under the condition that, should she fail to achieve at least one title before graduating junior high, Yaichi would marry into their family and inherit the inn.

== Media ==
=== Light novels ===
The Ryuo's Work is Never Done! is written by Shirow Shiratori and illustrated by Shirabii. SB Creative published the first volume in September 2015 under their GA Bunko label, with twenty volumes and six short story volumes being released as of July 2025. An English translated digital release was done by BookWalker. In July 2026, J-Novel Club announced that they had licensed the series, using BookWalker's translation as a base.

No.	Original release date	Original ISBN	English release date	English ISBN
1	September 15, 2015	978-4-79-738484-0	October 24, 2017 (BookWalker); July 17, 2026 (J-Novel Club)	978-1-71-836356-4 (BW); 978-1-71-836356-4 (JNC)
2	January 15, 2016	978-4-79-738676-9; 978-4-79-738490-1 (SE)	January 31, 2018 (BookWalker); July 17, 2026 (J-Novel Club)	—
3	May 14, 2016	978-4-79-738817-6	May 29, 2018 (BookWalker); July 17, 2026 (J-Novel Club)	—
4	September 15, 2016	978-4-79738818-3; 978-4-79-738819-0 (SE)	July 17, 2018	978-4-79-739783-3 (BW)
5	February 15, 2017	978-4-79-739009-4; 978-4-79-739010-0 (SE)	September 14, 2018	—
6	July 15, 2017	978-4-79-739189-3; 978-4-79-739190-9 (SE)	December 21, 2018	—
7	January 15, 2018	978-4-79-739550-1; 978-4-79-739429-0 (SE)	March 25, 2019	—
8	March 15, 2018	978-4-79-739592-1	June 25, 2019	—
9	August 10, 2018	978-4-79-739627-0; 978-4-79-739626-3 (SE)	September 10, 2019	—
10	February 15, 2019	978-4-81-560101-0; 978-4-81-560102-7 (SE)	November 30, 2019	—
11	August 9, 2019	978-4-81-560378-6; 978-4-81-560296-3 (SE)	February 25, 2020	—
12	February 14, 2020	978-4-81-560533-9; 978-4-81-560494-3 (SE)	June 30, 2020	—
13	August 6, 2020	978-4-81-560644-2	November 30, 2020	—
14	February 10, 2021	978-4-81-560661-9; 978-4-81-560660-2 (SE); 978-4-81-560788-3 (SE)	June 22, 2021	—
15	September 14, 2021	978-4-81-561094-4; 978-4-81-561093-7 (SE)	February 24, 2022	—
15.5	December 17, 2021	978-4-81-561469-0	—	—
16	April 14, 2022	978-4-81-561502-4	October 25, 2022	—
16.5	December 15, 2022	978-4-8156-1850-6	—	—
17	December 15, 2022	978-4-81-561790-5	July 25, 2023	—
17.5	July 14, 2023	978-4-8156-2242-8	—	—
18	July 14, 2023	978-4-8156-2243-5	November 1, 2024	—
OTB1	December 15, 2023	978-4-8156-2353-1	—	—
19	June 15, 2024	978-4-8156-2586-3	—	—
OTB2	September 14, 2024	978-4-8156-2587-0	—	—
OTB3	January 12, 2025	978-4-8156-2588-7	—	—
20	July 12, 2025	978-4-8156-2698-3; 978-4-8156-2699-0 (SE); 978-4-8156-2700-3 (SE)	—	—
21	July 17, 2026	978-4-8156-3967-9; 978-4-8156-3968-6 (SE)	—	—

=== Manga ===
A manga adaptation with art by Kogetaokoge was serialized in Square Enix's seinen manga magazine Young Gangan from October 2, 2015, to August 2, 2019. The series covers the story of the first five volumes of the light novels.

No.	Release date	ISBN
1	January 13, 2016	978-4-75-754856-5
2	May 12, 2016	978-4-75-754992-0
3	September 13, 2016	978-4-75-755071-1
4	September 13, 2016	978-4-75-755243-2
5	July 13, 2017	978-4-75-755400-9
6	December 25, 2017	978-4-75-755562-4
7	March 13, 2018	978-4-75-755652-2
8	August 8, 2018	978-4-75-755802-1
9	February 13, 2019	978-4-75-756006-2
10	August 9, 2019	978-4-75-756244-8

=== Anime ===
An anime television series adaptation by Project No.9 was announced in July 2017. The series was directed by Shinsuke Yanagi with scripts written by Fumihiko Shimo and character designs by Akane Yano. Kenji Kawai composed the music at Nippon Columbia, and Dreamshift produced the series. The series aired from January 8 to March 26, 2018, and it ran for 12 episodes. Machico performed the opening theme song "Kore Kara" (コレカラ; "From Now On"), while Miku Itō performed the ending theme song "Mamoritai-mono no Tame ni" (守りたいもののために; "For What I Want to Protect"). Same as the manga series, the anime series also covers the story of the first five volumes of the light novels.

No.	Title (Note: All English episode titles are taken from Crunchyroll.)	Original air date
1	"A Disciple Storms In"; Transliteration: "Oshikake Deshi" (Japanese: 押しかけ弟子)	January 8, 2018
Yaichi Kuzuryū is a prodigy shogi player who is visited by Ai Hinatsuru, a little girl who ran away from home with the desire to be his disciple.
2	"Days with a Disciple"; Transliteration: "Deshi no Iru Nichijō" (Japanese: 弟子のいる日常)	January 15, 2018
Yaichi accepts Ai as his disciple and starts coaching her and her new friends, until Ai's parents appear determined to take her back home.
3	"Training Group Entrance Exam"; Transliteration: "Kenshū-kai Shiken" (Japanese: 研修会試験)	January 22, 2018
To convince her parents that she has what it takes to become a professional shogi player, Ai takes part in a qualification exam, promising to win all three matches against different players. Despite her failure, they agree to allow her to become Yaichi's disciple after he asks them for it, but under an unexpected condition.
4	"The other Ai"; Transliteration: "Mōhitori no Ai" (Japanese: もう一人のあい)	January 29, 2018
Yaichi is called to fulfill a request to have Ai Yashajin, a girl around Ai's age as his disciple. Realizing her potential Yaichi agrees to help with her training without Ai knowing, until his secret is exposed by a coincidental meeting.
5	"Artlessly Flawless"; Transliteration: "Ten'imuhō" (Japanese: 天衣無縫)	February 5, 2018
Ai has a fallout with Yaichi upon discovering that he is teaching Yashajin behind her back. Sometime later, Yashajin takes her qualification exam, having a fierce match with Ai in the occasion.
6	"All-Rounder"; Transliteration: "Ōruraundā" (Japanese: オールラウンダー)	February 12, 2018
To improve his playstyle, Yaichi seeks guidance from a veteran player who agrees in exchange for having him and Ai working at his place.
7	"Dear 10-Year-Old Me"; Transliteration: "Jussai no Watashi e" (Japanese: 十才のわたしへ)	February 19, 2018
Keika has few time left to win a promotion to the professional league before she is forced to retire. To test her determination, she bets everything in the next matches, but her opponents are none other than the two Ai's.
8	"First Tournament"; Transliteration: "Hajimete no Taikai" (Japanese: はじめての大会)	February 26, 2018
The two Ai's take part in their first tournament, which is also the opportunity for Keika to finally be promoted to the professional league.
9	"August First"; Transliteration: "Hachigatsu Tsuitachi" (Japanese: 八月一日)	March 5, 2018
Ai's next opponent in the tournament is Ika Sainokami, a dangerous and selfish player obsessed with Yaichi, but she is determined to win for a special reason.
10	"Spinning Dragon"; Transliteration: "Supiningu Doragon" (Japanese: スピニングドラゴン)	March 12, 2018
Yaichi's 7-round match against the Meijin to defend his Ryuo title begins. After being defeated three times, Yaichi is thrown into despair and fearing for his and Ai's careers, he comes with a bold decision.
11	"Best Wishes"; Transliteration: "Kotobuki" (Japanese: 寿)	March 19, 2018
In preparation for his next match, Yaichi holes himself up at home, shunning everybody around him, until he takes a break to watch Keika's decisive match in order to enter the professional league, and is surprised with how it unfolds.
12	"The Final Judgment"; Transliteration: "Saigo no Shinpan" (Japanese: 最後の審判)	March 26, 2018
Yaichi's next match against the Meijin ends with a double foul and a rematch starts soon after. As he plays against the strongest player ever, Yaichi takes into heart all his experiences with his friends to make a breakthrough and keep his title.

=== Video game ===
A visual novel-styled shogi game based on the series was released for the PlayStation 4 and Nintendo Switch on November 26, 2020.

== Reception ==
The light novel ranked first in 2017 in Takarajimasha's annual light novel guide book Kono Light Novel ga Sugoi!, in the bunkobon category. It ranked first again in 2018, second in 2019, and second again in 2020. As of August, 2020, over 2 million of copies have been sold.

Kei Mizutome (水留啓, Mizutome Kei) listed the book as one of four "essential" novels introducing shogi to a wider audience, saying that it was well-researched and that people familiar with the shogi world can guess on whom the characters of the Meijin and Maestro are based.

== See also ==
- No-Rin, another light novel series by the same author
