= Heir to a Monstermancer =

Japanese light novel series

- First light novel volume cover

魔物使いの娘 (Mamono Tsukai no Musume)
- Genre: Fantasy
- Novel series
- Written by: Damu Amato
- Published by: Shōsetsuka ni Narō
- Original run: November 30, 2016 – April 2, 2024
- Light novel
- Written by: Damu Amato
- Illustrated by: Shirabii
- Published by: Drecom Media
- English publisher: NA: J-Novel Club
- Imprint: DRE Novels
- Original run: December 10, 2024 – present
- Volumes: 3
- Manga
- Written by: Damu Amato
- Illustrated by: Yū Satō
- Published by: Drecom Media
- Magazine: Drecomi+
- Original run: September 11, 2026 – present
- Anime television series
- Directed by: Chihiro Kumano
- Written by: Satoru Sugizawa
- Studio: Project No.9

Heir to a Monstermancer (Japanese: 魔物使いの娘, Hepburn: Mamono Tsukai no Musume) is a Japanese web novel series written by Damu Amato. It was originally serialized on the online publication platform Shōsetsuka ni Narō from November 2016 to April 2024. It later began publication by Drecom Media as a light novel under their DRE Novels imprint featuring illustrations by Shirabii in December 2024, with three volumes released as of July 2026. A manga adaptation illustrated by Yū Satō began serialization on Drecom Media's Drecomi+ web service in September 2026. An anime television series adaptation produced by Project No.9 has been announced.

== Plot ==
Hakura, an adventurer, is nearly killed by a hydra, only to be rescued by Leen, a witch's descendant. Leen, being descended from a witch, does not feel attached to humans, finding them incomprehensible. Thankful for being saved, Hakura offers to become Leen's bodyguard, with the two starting their adventures together. However, despite their partnership, the two find themselves bickering, with Leen's views on humans conflicting with her companionship with Hakura.

== Characters ==
Leen (リーン, Rīn)
Voiced by: Manaka Iwami
A witch who is descended from the primordial witch of their world. She has a selfish personality and look down upon humans. She has the ability to tame monsters.
Hakura Istilla (ハクラ・イスティラ, Hakura Isutira)
Voiced by: Chiaki Kobayashi
Ao (アオ)
Voiced by: Akio Otsuka

== Media ==
=== Light novels ===
Damu Amato originally began posting the series on the online publication platform Shōsetsuka ni Narō on November 30, 2016, with Amato posting 168 chapters including an epilogue until April 2, 2024. The series was later submitted to a contest by the publishing company Drecom Media in 2024, where it won the Grand Prize. Drecom Media began publishing it as a light novel under their DRE Novels imprint with illustrations by Shirabii, with the first volume being released on December 10, 2024; three volumes have been released as of July 10, 2026. A voice drama featuring Manaka Iwami as Leen and Chiaki Kobayashi as Hakura was released on YouTube to promote the first volume's release. The series is licensed in English by J-Novel Club.

No.	Title	Original release date	North American release date
1	The Girl with the Green Eyes 緑の瞳の少女	December 10, 2024; 978-4-434-34612-5	November 17, 2025; 978-1-71-831174-9
2	The Witch Hunter with the Obsidian Stone 黒い石の魔女狩り	July 10, 2025; 978-4-434-36056-5	February 13, 2026; 978-1-71-831176-3
3	— 一角獣の祝祭	July 10, 2026; 978-4-434-38066-2	—

=== Manga ===
A one-shot promotional webtoon produced by MITA, Gudan and Red Seven was published on Drecom Media's official website on November 29, 2024.

A manga adaptation illustrated by Yū Satō began serialization on Drecom Media's Drecomi+ web service on September 11, 2026.

=== Anime ===
An anime television series adaptation was announced on July 3, 2026. The series is produced by Project No.9 and directed by Chihiro Kumano, and features scripts written by Satoru Sugizawa and character designs by Akane Kasasagi. The cast from voice drama are reprising their roles.
