= My Stepmom's Daughter Is My Ex =

Japanese light novel series

- First light novel volume cover, featuring Yume and Mizuto Irido

継母の連れ子が元カノだった (Mamahaha no Tsurego ga Motokano datta)
- Genre: Romantic comedy
- Novel series
- Written by: Kyōsuke Kamishiro
- Published by: Kakuyomu
- Original run: August 7, 2017 – present
- Light novel
- Written by: Kyōsuke Kamishiro
- Illustrated by: Takayaki
- Published by: Kadokawa Shoten
- English publisher: NA: J-Novel Club
- Imprint: Kadokawa Sneaker Bunko
- Original run: December 1, 2018 – present
- Volumes: 13
- Manga
- Written by: Kyōsuke Kamishiro
- Illustrated by: Rei Kusakabe
- Published by: Fujimi Shobo
- English publisher: NA: Udon Entertainment
- Magazine: Niconico Seiga (Dra Dra Sharp, Dra Dra Flat)
- Original run: April 26, 2019 – present
- Volumes: 11
- Anime television series
- Directed by: Shinsuke Yanagi
- Written by: Deko Akao
- Music by: Hiromi Mizutani
- Studio: Project No.9
- Licensed by: Crunchyroll; SA/SEA: Medialink
- Original network: AT-X, Tokyo MX, BS NTV, MBS, BS Fuji
- Original run: July 6, 2022 – September 21, 2022
- Episodes: 12
- icon

My Stepmom's Daughter Is My Ex (継母の連れ子が元カノだった, Mamahaha no Tsurego ga Motokano datta; lit. 'The Stepmom's Child Was the Ex-Girlfriend'), also known as Tsurekano (連れカノ), is a Japanese romantic comedy light novel series written by Kyōsuke Kamishiro and illustrated by Takayaki. The series began serialization on the online novel website Kakuyomu in August 2017, with a print version beginning publication under Kadokawa Shoten's Kadokawa Sneaker Bunko imprint in December 2018. The light novel is licensed digitally in North America by J-Novel Club. A manga adaptation by Rei Kusakabe began serialization online by Fujimi Shobo via Niconico Seiga website as part of the Dra Dra Sharp and Dra Dra Flat brands in April 2019. An anime television series adaptation produced by Project No.9 aired from July to September 2022.

== Synopsis ==
When they were middle schoolers, Mizuto and Yume were a completely normal couple. Between flirtations and shouting matches for minor reasons, the two students stayed together until they entered high school, where they finally decided to break up. What they do not know is that fate sometimes has many surprises in store, and that they will be reunited again as stepbrother and sister only after two weeks.

Indeed, their respective parents are about to remarry and the former couple will have to live under the same roof on a daily basis. In order not to hinder their parents' happiness, they accept the situation and decide to put in place the rule of brothers and sisters, according to which the first who feels attraction towards the other loses.

== Characters ==
Mizuto Irido (伊理戸 水斗, Irido Mizuto)
Voiced by: Yūto Uemura (drama CD), Hiro Shimono (anime)
Mizuto is Yume's ex-boyfriend who became her stepbrother when his father, Mineaki, remarried her mother, Yuni. He shares a fondness for reading with Yume and has high grades, leading to a competitive relationship with her. He and Yume were born on the same day. His mother died when he was young. Mizuto and Yume develop feelings for each other again, but their relationship becomes complicated after their parents announce that they are expecting a child.
Yume Irido (伊理戸 結女, Irido Yume)
Voiced by: Aoi Koga (drama CD), Rina Hidaka (anime)
Her name was Yume Ayai (綾井 結女, Ayai Yume) before her mother, Yuni, married Mizuto's father, Mineaki Irido, two weeks after she and Mizuto broke up. She and Mizuto were born on the same day. She is an excellent student and is fond of reading novels. She wore glasses when she was in middle school and dating Mizuto.
Akatsuki Minami (南 暁月, Minami Akatsuki)
Voiced by: Yūki Takada (drama CD), Ikumi Hasegawa (anime)
Kogure's childhood friend. She and Kogure previously dated, but they broke up after he developed an illness as a result of her excessive affection for him and had to be hospitalized.
Kogure Kawanami (川波 小暮, Kawanami Kogure)
Voiced by: Tasuku Hatanaka (drama CD), Nobuhiko Okamoto (anime)
Akatsuki's childhood friend. He and Akatsuki previously dated.
Isana Higashira (東頭 いさな, Higashira Isana)
Voiced by: Yumiri Hanamori (drama CD), Miyu Tomita (anime)
Mizuto and Yume's classmate. She is fond of reading books such as light novels. She frequents the library, where she meets up with Mizuto.
Mineaki Irido (伊理戸 峰秋, Irido Mineaki)
Voiced by: Kazuyuki Okitsu (anime)
Mizuto's father who married Yume's mother. His first wife died while giving birth to Mizuto.
Yuni Irido (伊理戸 由仁, Irido Yuni)
Voiced by: Ai Kayano (anime)
Yume's mother who married Mizuto's father after divorcing her first husband.
Madoka Tanesato (種里 円香, Tanesato Madoka)
Voiced by: Yoko Hikasa (anime)
Chikuma Tanesato (種里 竹馬, Tanesato Chikuma)
Voiced by: Hinata Satō (anime)

== Production ==
The first names of Yume and Mizuto come from "oil" (the pronunciation of oil (油) is yu in Japanese) and "water" (mizu means water (水) in Japanese), respectively. The surnames of Irido, Ayai, Higashira (lit. "east head") and Tanesato come from Conan Doyle ("Irido" is almost an anagram of "Doiru", the Japanese pronunciation of Doyle), Yukito Ayatsuji (only the word Aya (綾) is taken), Nisio Isin (while Nisio is the surname, it literally means "west tail", the opposite of "east head") and Ellery Queen (while Queen is a duo whose surnames are Dannay and Lee, "Danna-" is pronounced like tane and "Lee" is pronounced like ri ("里" can be pronounced as sato and ri in Japanese)), respectively.

The author Kyōsuke Kamishiro set Yume and Mizuto's birthday as November 3 since both 11 and 3 are prime numbers, which cannot be "separated" (in Japanese, "割る" means "to divide" and "to separate").

The location setting of the story had been kept ambiguous since its web serialization. However, after several years, Kamishiro decided to set it in an actual location, Kyoto, since the story in Volume 8 takes place in Kobe.

== Media ==
=== Light novels ===
The series began serialization on the online novel website Kakuyomu on August 7, 2017, with a print version beginning publication under Kadokawa Shoten's Kadokawa Sneaker Bunko imprint on December 1, 2018; the series has thirteen volumes as of October 31, 2025. The light novel is licensed digitally in North America by J-Novel Club. The series will end with the release of its fourteenth volume on December 1, 2026.

In the Blu-ray set of the anime series, an original what-if story titled Mamahaha no Tsurego ga Imakano datta (継母の連れ子が今カノだった; lit. 'The Stepmom's Child Has been the Girlfriend Now') written by Kyōsuke Kamishiro is included. The story is about what if Yume and Mizuto did not break up before they became stepsiblings.

| No. | Title | Original release date | English release date |
|---|---|---|---|
| 1 | Why Can't We Move On!? Mukashi no Koi ga Owatte Kurenai (昔の恋が終わってくれない) | December 1, 2018; 978-4-04-107684-2 | February 14, 2022; 978-1-71-838897-0 |
1. Don’t Call Us an Ex-Couple; 2. The Ex-Couple House-Sit; 3. The Ex-Couple Start School; 4. The Ex-Girlfriend Gets Measured; 5. The Ex-Boyfriend Nurses Back to Health; 6. The Ex-Girlfriend Is Waiting in Dreams; 7. The Ex-Couple Try Dating (Part 1 of 2); 8. The Ex-Couple Try Dating (Part 2 of 2); 9. The Couple Exchange Gifts
| 2 | Even If We Aren't Dating... Tatoe Koibito Janaku tatte (たとえ恋人じゃなくたって) | May 1, 2019; 978-4-04-108255-3 | May 2, 2022; 978-1-71-838899-4 |
1. A Day in the Life of the Ex-Couple; 2. The Ex-Couple Change Seats; 3. The Ex-Couple Lean Against Each Other; 4. The Ex-Couple Have a Sleepover; 5. The Ex-Couple Quarrel; 6. The Ex-Girlfriend Will Not Get Jealous; 7. Isana Higashira Does Not Know What Love Is
| 3 | Childhood Friends No More; Osananajimi wa Yameteoke (幼馴染みはやめておけ) | December 1, 2019; 978-4-04-108264-5 | July 18, 2022; 978-1-71-838901-4 |
1. A Day in the Life of the Ex-Couple; 2. Isana Higashira Comes Over; 3. Isana Higashira Dresses Up; 4. Kogure Kawanami Won’t Accept This; 5. Minami Akatsuki Won’t Talk About It; 6. The Ex-Childhood Friends Want to Watch Over; 7. The Ex-Childhood Friend Is Lonely; 8. Childhood Friends No More (Part 1); 9. Childhood Friends No More (Part 2)
| 4 | First Kiss Manifesto; Fāsuto Kisu ga Fukoku-suru (ファースト・キスが布告する) | April 1, 2020; 978-4-04-109164-7 | October 3, 2022; 978-1-71-838903-8 |
1. A Day in the Life of the Future Couple; 2. The Ex-Couple Wants Stimulation; 3. The Ex-Girlfriend Does Reconnaissance; 4. The Ex-Couple Visits Family (1); 5. The Ex-Couple Visits Family (2); 6. The Childhood Friends Go to the Pool; 7. The Ex-Couple Visits Family (3); 8. The Ex-Couple Visits Family (4)
| 5 | The Only You in the World; Anata wa Ko no Yo ni Tada Hitori (あなたはこの世にただ一人) | September 1, 2020; 978-4-04-109165-4; 978-4-04-109540-9 (SE) | December 21, 2022; 978-1-71-838905-2 |
1. The Ex-Girlfriend Hides Her Embarrassment; 2. The Ex-Girlfriend Nurses Back to Health; 3. Isana Higashira Will Not Be Led Astray; 4. The Ex-Couple House-Sit; 5. Commemoration; 6. The Only You in the World; 7. The Ex-Couple Confer
| 6 | The Six Things I Couldn't Say; Ano Toki Ienakatta Muttsu no Koto (あのとき言えなかった六つのこと) | January 29, 2021; 978-4-04-111043-0 | March 13, 2023; 978-1-71-838907-6 |
1. “You’re amazing.”; 2. “Cute in a normal way.”; 3. “Yeah. Maybe.”; 4. “Hello?”; 5. “Sorry.”; 6. Thank You
| 7 | Just a Bit More Like This; Mō Sukoshi dake Ko no Mama de (もう少しだけこのままで) | July 30, 2021; 978-4-04-111044-7 | July 3, 2023; 978-1-71-838909-0 |
1. The Person I Like Lives with Me; 2. I Want to Make You Blush; 3. The Way You See Me; 4. Because You Watch over Me; 5. Just a Bit More Like This
| 8 | Time to Get Serious; Sorosoro Honki wo Deshite Miro (そろそろ本気を出してみろ) | February 1, 2022; 978-4-04-111953-2 | October 2, 2023; 978-1-71-838911-3 |
1. It’s a Lot of Effort Just to Invite Him; 2. Parallel Date in an Exotic World; 3. The Youthful Summertime Steam Incident; 4. Aisa’s Seriousness; 5. Show Me Your Serious Self
| 9 | A Proposal Isn't Enough; Puropōzu Ja Monotarinai (プロポーズじゃ物足りない) | July 1, 2022; 978-4-04-111954-9 | December 18, 2023; 978-1-71-838913-7 |
1. This Path Is Bound to Be Fun; 2. Soulmate; 3. War against Worldly Desires; 4. End of Olden Days; 5. When the Hiyoku no Tori Flies; 6. A Proposal Isn’t Enough
| 10 | Within Arm's Reach; Te wo Nobasereba Kimi ga Iru (手を伸ばせれば君がいる) | April 1, 2023; 978-4-04-113458-0 | March 4, 2024; 978-1-71-838915-1 |
1. How It Begins and How It Will Continue; 2. Secrets Taste like Honey; 3. A Normal Girl’s Confession; 4. That Which Is Obtained Is Nothing but a Bright Illusion; 5. Within Arm’s Reach
| 11 | You Wouldn't Get It; Dōse Anata wa Wakaranai (どうせあなたはわからない) | December 1, 2023; 978-4-04-114276-9 | July 21, 2024; 978-1-71-838917-5 |
Prologue: A Familiar Face before Our Departure; 1. Day One of Getting Closer; 2. The Turbulent Second Day; 3. The Deeply Involved Third Day; 4. The Conclusive Fourth Day; Final Chapter: The Fifth Day for Just the Two(?) of Us
| 12 | There's Only One Guy for Me; Otoko nante Ichi-ri Shika inai (男なんて一人しかいない) | November 1, 2024; 978-4-04-115070-2 | April 15, 2025; 978-1-71-838919-9 |
Interlude 1; 1. Only the Bird Chirping in the Morning Knows What Happened at Night; Interlude 2; 2. Adolescent Hell Heretic Address to the Gods; Interlude 3; 3. Paradise in a Closed-Off Garden; Interlude 4; 4. There's Only One Guy for Me; Final Chapter: The Door Between Worlds
| 13 | You, More Than Anyone Else; Anata ni konoyo de dare yori mo (あなたにこの世で誰よりも) | October 31, 2025; 978-4-04-116934-6 | May 26, 2026; 978-1-71-838921-2 |
Prologue: Four Years Later: A Call While Working Part 1; 1. The Reason the Illustrator Doesn't Approve of the Character Design; 2. The Reason the Screenwriter Wants to Confer with Me; 3. The Reason Those Girls Ask Me About My Destination; 4. The Reason She Won’t Show Herself; 5. Four Years Later: A Call While Working Part 2; Final Chapter: The Big Event
| 14 | Kamisama ga shikaketa torappu, sunawachi (神様が仕掛けたトラップ、すなわち) | December 1, 2026; 978-4-04-117934-5; 978-4-04-117935-2 (SE) | — |

=== Manga ===
A manga adaptation by Rei Kusakabe began serialization online via Niconico Seiga website as part of the Dra Dra Sharp and Dra Dra Flat brands on April 26, 2019, and has been compiled into eleven volumes by Fujimi Shobo as of May 8, 2026. At Anime Expo 2023, Udon Entertainment announced that they licensed the manga for English publication.

| No. | Original release date | Original ISBN | English release date | English ISBN |
|---|---|---|---|---|
| 1 | December 9, 2019 | 978-4-04-073393-7 | July 30, 2024 | 978-1-77294-315-3 |
| 2 | July 9, 2020 | 978-4-04-073715-7 | July 22, 2025 | 978-1-77294-316-0 |
| 3 | May 8, 2021 | 978-4-04-074057-7 | August 18, 2026 | 978-1-77294-317-7 |
| 4 | May 9, 2022 | 978-4-04-074461-2 | December 8, 2026 | 978-1-77294-318-4 |
| 5 | December 9, 2022 | 978-4-04-074782-8 | — | — |
| 6 | July 7, 2023 | 978-4-04-075054-5 | — | — |
| 7 | January 9, 2024 | 978-4-04-075284-6 | — | — |
| 8 | July 9, 2024 | 978-4-04-075524-3 | — | — |
| 9 | January 9, 2025 | 978-4-04-075750-6 | — | — |
| 10 | July 9, 2025 | 978-4-04-075916-6 | — | — |
| 11 | May 8, 2026 | 978-4-04-076275-3 | — | — |

=== Anime ===
An anime adaptation was announced on July 21, 2021. It was later revealed to be a television series produced by Project No.9. The series was directed by Shinsuke Yanagi, with Deko Akao handling the scripts, Katsuyuki Sato designing the characters, and Hiromi Mizutani composing the music. It aired from July 6 to September 21, 2022, on AT-X, Tokyo MX, BS NTV, MBS, and BS Fuji. The opening theme song is "Deneb to Spica" (デネブとスピカ; "Deneb and Spica") by Dialogue+, while the ending theme song is "Futari Pinocchio" (ふたりピノキオ; "Two Pinocchios") by Harmoe. Crunchyroll streamed the series.

==== Episodes ====
| No. | Title (Note: All English titles are taken from Crunchyroll.) | Directed by | Written by | Storyboarded by | Original release date |
|---|---|---|---|---|---|
| 1 | "The Former Couple Refuses to Say... 'It's things like this...!'" Transliteration: "Moto Kappuru wa Yobitakunai 'Sō Iu Tokoro ga......!'" (Japanese: 元カップルは呼びたくない「そういうところが......！」) | Mitsutoshi Satō | Deko Akao | Shinsuke Yanagi | July 6, 2022 |
Yume and Mizuto become stepsiblings after Yume's mother Yuni married Mizuto's father Mineaki. Unfortunately, their parents are unaware they once dated in middle school. As such, they decide that anytime either of them acts like an ex, they must admit they are the younger sibling. While trying to provoke each other, Yume is tricked into using Mizuto's surname. At school, several boys pretend to be Mizuto's friends just to get closer to Yume. Angry on his behalf, Yume clings to Mizuto and claims she has a brother complex, so the boys back off, though Yume is embarrassed her breasts made contact with Mizuto's arm. For revenge, she decides to sit by him wearing only a bath towel, tricking him into peeking at her. This almost works but she goes too far and her towel almost falls off until Mizuto actually helps her stay covered up. Defeated, she tries to leave but trips and they fall on the sofa together. In this situation, with Yume almost naked, they forget about the game and almost kiss but are interrupted by their parents. They both realize situations like this are exactly why they no longer like each other.
| 2 | "My Ex Needs Taking Care Of 'Thirty-Eight Degrees, Apparently'"; Transliteration: "Moto Kappuru no Kanbyō na Hi 'Sanjūhachido tte Kiitakedo'" (Japanese: 元カップルの看病な日「三十八度って聞いたけど」) | Takeyuki Sadohara | Satoru Sugizawa | Keiichi Ishikura | July 13, 2022 |
Mizuto is approached by Kogure Kawanami, who states he will be Mizuto's friend and has no intention of using him to get to Yume. During fitness exams, Akatsuki Minami excels at sports and Yume overdoes it trying to keep up and faints, though Mizuto catches her. Yume asks Minami to keep how bad she is at sports a secret and they become friends. Mizuto aggravates Yume, though Minami suspects he was trying to be nice. Yume catches a fever and Minami insists on visiting her. A delirious Yume almost says something embarrassing to Mizuto until she sees Minami. Minami correctly deduces Mizuto once had a girlfriend and wonders if dating again will be awkward now he lives with a stepsister. She also asks if he sees Yume as more than a sister, but he denies this. Yume only falls asleep when Mizuto holds her hand, which he recalls they always did while they were dating if one of them was ill. After making several demands of him, Mizuto forces her to take her temperature again, revealing she had recovered but faked being ill so he would be nice to her. Mizuto forgives her after she apologizes.
| 3 | "My Ex Has a Confession to Make 'You Didn't Do Anything Weird, Did You?'"; Transliteration: "Moto Kappuru wa Hakujō Suru 'Hennakoto, Shi Tenaidarou na?'" (Japanese: 元カップルは白状する「変なこと、してないだろうな？」) | Mitsutoshi Satō | Maika Shizuhara | Mitsutoshi Satō | July 20, 2022 |
Six months previously, while still dating, Yume obsessively kept every item Mizuto gave her. Today, Yume finds herself with a pair of Mizuto's underwear. Certain that having them counts as losing their game, she is determined to return them. She attempts to sneak into his room, only to find Mizuto doing the same thing with her bra. Despite their suspicion, they both admit they broke the rules and can freely demand one thing. The next day, Yume sees Mizuto with a girl and when he brings the girl home, Yume uses her one demand to force him to go food shopping, leaving the girl alone in his room, but she disappears. Mizuto demands Yume check her room, but she insists nothing has been moved or taken. Mizuto is worried as the girl was actually Minami in disguise and she had asked him to marry her because she is obsessed with Yume and marrying Mizuto would make Yume her sister. Kawanami, who is Minami's childhood friend, admits Minami can become intensely obsessed. As a favor, he tells Mizuto how to stop her. Mizuto later goes straight to Yume and for his demand, asks her on a date.
| 4 | "That's Not What You're Supposed to Say"; Transliteration: "Sō Iu no Janai" (Japanese: そういうのじゃない) | Yoshiyuki Hinosaki | Deko Akao | Yoshihisa Iida | July 27, 2022 |
On the day of the date, Yume frets constantly over Mizuto's motivation and for some reason finds herself extremely attracted to him. Via a flashback, it is shown the date was Kawanami's idea. The date becomes more tense as Mizuto's guilt mixes with Yume's genuine awkwardness. While Mizuto is in the bathroom, Yume becomes lost. Mizuto phones her but Yume finds she is disappointed when he is nice to her and does not mock her with sarcasm. She remembers a similar situation of being lost on their first date until he found her. Mizuto finds her and this time he does mocks her, so they descend into their usual bickering and actually enjoy themselves. Mizuto is surprised they get on better as stepsiblings than they did as lovers. After watching the date, Minami apologizes to Mizuto and promises to control herself. However, she reveals that she is not ready to give up her Yume obsession yet. Still confused over him asking for a date, Yume demands Mizuto submit to a punishment of sitting for a photoshoot, since she still currently finds him very attractive, and takes hundreds of photos.
| 5 | "The Former Couple Spends the Night 'You're Welcome'"; Transliteration: "Moto Kappuru wa o Tomari Suru 'Dōitashimashite'" (Japanese: 元カップルはお泊まりする「どういたしまして」) | Natsuki Kamada | Deko Akao | Hiroshi Aoyama | August 3, 2022 |
Yume asks Mizuto to help buy a gift for Yuni for Mother's Day. As such, they buy carnations, which makes Yuni cry tears of joy. Mizuto later prays at the shrine of his mother, who died when he was very young. As their parents are technically newlyweds, Mizuto suggests he and Yume give them a night alone by leaving the house. His suggestion of a cheap love hotel is rejected so Mizuto decides to stay overnight at Kawanami's while Yume sleeps next door at Minami's. Kawanami admits to Mizuto that he and Minami were best friends once, but despite living next door they have drifted apart. The boys prank each other by yelling embarrassing things through the thin walls, making both girls mad at them. After dinner at a restaurant, Kawanami points out to Mizuto that while he and Minami argue openly about everything, Mizuto and Yume argue by trying to trick, undermine and outdo each other, which does not seem healthy. Later that night, Mizuto and Yume meet on separate balconies. Mizuto comments that unless their parents have an unexpected divorce, they will be stuck as stepsiblings forever, which makes both of them sad.
| 6 | "The Former Couple Goes Head-to-Head 'Do You Think I'm Stupid?'"; Transliteration: "Moto Kappuru wa Kisoiau 'Baka ni Shinaide Yotsu!!'" (Japanese: 元カップルは競い合う「馬鹿にしないでよっ！！」) | Mitsutoshi Satō | Yūya Suzuzaki | Keiichi Ishikura | August 10, 2022 |
Exams are approaching and Yume, as top ranked student, is determined to maintain her position and beat Mizuto. After the first exam, she is furious when she discovers Mizuto deliberately lowered his own score to let her win. Yume starts to wonder if their rivalry was ever real. However, after the exams are over, Yume discovers Mizuto has replaced her as top rank student, though he challenges her to beat him during Finals if winning is so important. Yume realizes now she is second, she does not feel the pressure to be perfect and actually relaxes, which is what Mizuto had been trying to teach her. She rushes to find him to confess her love again but finds him talking to another girl, Isana Higashira, a severe introvert. Despite having met only recently, Mizuto considers Higashira his closest friend. Yume tries to hide her jealousy, but Mizuto automatically knows what is happening. First he tricks her into becoming flustered then demands to know what is wrong. Yume admits her jealousy so he antagonizes her so she returns to normal. After meeting Higashira, Yume is convinced they are just friends.
| 7 | "Higashira Isana Doesn't Know What Love Is"; Transliteration: "Higashira Isana wa Koi o Shiranai" (Japanese: 東頭いさなは恋を知らない) | Tomio Yamauchi | Maika Shizuhara | Keiichi Ishikura | August 17, 2022 |
Yume and Minami interrogate Higashira over liking Mizuto. Minami declares she and Yume will help her get a date with Mizuto, but Higashira refuses as she prefers to just remain friends. Yume realizes Higashira is unsure of herself, just like she was in middle school. After watching Mizuto with Higashira at school, Yume and Minami are forced to admit Mizuto is not romantically interested. To kickstart some interest, Minami insists Higashira use her breasts to entice him. However, Mizuto fails to take an interest. Yume realizes trying to change Higashira's personality to attract Mizuto is wrong. Minami decides to give her a makeover instead, but Mizuto barely reacts except to tease her. As a last resort, Minami tells Higashira to confess as soon as possible. Higashira manages to give a heartfelt confession but Mizuto lets her down gently, explaining that while he is sure they would make a good couple, his heart already belongs to someone else. Yume is upset Mizuto still has such strong feelings he keeps hidden. Higashira returns to being Mizuto's friend and finds she enjoys it more knowing there is no romantic tension.
| 8 | "The Former Couple's On Edge 'I've Already Been Rejected, So It's Fine.'"; Transliteration: "Moto Kappuru wa Keikai Suru 'Watashi wa mō Fura Reteru Ndesukara, Daijōbudesuyo'" (Japanese: 元カップルは警戒する「わたしはもうフラれてるんですから、大丈夫ですよ」) | Masayuki Matsumoto | Maika Shizuhara | Royden B | August 24, 2022 |
Higashira asks to see Mizuto's book collection, stating she would feel safe in his room since he already rejected her. Yume and Minami insist on updating Higashira's clothing, still hoping Mizuto might show romantic interest. However, due to Higashira's ample bust, everything she wears looks risqué. Minami decides Higashira should dress like Yume, though to avoid looking like a copycat, Minami insists Yume also change clothes. Higashira finds a skirt she likes but Yume worries they have made Higashira too attractive. During the visit, Higashira is astonished at the size of Mizuto's book collection. Yume insists on joining them as a chaperone and is surprised to see them acting so casually. In private, Higashira admits to Yume she thinks she will always have feelings for Mizuto but will stay as friends to keep him in her life. With Higashira in the bathroom, Yume jealously asks Mizuto to put her socks on for her, but is embarrassed to find him touching her legs is erotic. Mizuto later wonders if he and Yume had remained friends instead of dating, would they now be as close as he is with Higashira.
| 9 | "Youthful Indiscretion"; Transliteration: "Wakage no Itari" (Japanese: 若気の至り) | Takeyuki Sadohara | Maika Shizuhara | Royden B Masayuki Takahashi | August 31, 2022 |
In the past, Yume was nervous the first time she entered Mizuto's room, thinking they might be ready to have sex, but all they did was read books. This upset Yume and made Mizuto angry at himself. Yume was further disappointed when she and Mizuto were placed in separate classrooms. This forced separation allowed Yume to make her first friend. Unfortunately, Mizuto became jealous and snapped at Yume. When he tried to apologize, she accused him of cheating on her with another girl, resulting in them not speaking to each other. Weeks later, they attempted to reconcile but pride and embarrassment caused their relationship to stagnated to the point they did not speak for months, and did not celebrate their one year anniversary, Christmas, New Year's Eve or even Valentine's Day. Finally, on the day they graduated middle school, they broke up as Mizuto could no longer handle both loving and hating Yume at the same time. Two weeks later, their parents announced their engagement and Yume and Mizuto became stepsiblings. Now in the present, during yet another argument, they both blame each other for not having sex the first time Yume visited Mizuto's room.
| 10 | "The Former Couple Doesn't Know How to Act 'Aren't You Two Acting a Little Awkward?'"; Transliteration: "Moto Kappuru wa Kyorikan ga Wakaranai 'Nanka Yosoyososhiku Nattenai ka?'" (Japanese: 元カップルは距離感がわからない「なんかよそよそしくなってないか？」) | Yōhei Fukui | Satoru Sugizawa | Yoshiyuki Hinosaki | September 7, 2022 |
Yume spots a cockroach in her room and insists on sharing Mizuto's bed. Mizuto struggles with his feelings but does his best to forget them. While arguing the next day, their parents tease them. Mineaki announces they will be visiting his family for Obon, and as there will be swimming in the local river Yuni insists Yume and Mizuto buy swimsuits. Yume is unsure about the suit she chooses and asks Mizuto's opinion. He compliments her, but they are both embarrassed. Walking home, they pass the wall where they had their first kiss. Higashira later visits and Yume becomes jealous. Higashira is likewise jealous when Mizuto and Yume casually drink from the same cup. Mizuto ends up falling asleep in Yume's lap. Higashira is tempted to kiss him, though Yume dissuades her. Higashira then reveals she is tempted to try a friends with benefits relationship with Mizuto. Higashira leaves and though Yume is also tempted to kiss Mizuto, she also realizes forgetting her feelings would be for the best. Yuni is curious about Higashira and Mizuto and comments that Yume will probably find a boyfriend soon. However, Yume finds it impossible to picture dating anyone except Mizuto.
| 11 | "The Former Couple Visits Relatives 'I Guess You Could Say She Loved to Laugh'"; Transliteration: "Moto Kappuru wa Kisei Suru 'Yoku, Warau Hitodatta ka na'" (Japanese: 元カップルは帰省する「よく、笑う人だったかな」) | Kū Nanbara | Deko Akao | Jun'ichi Sakata | September 14, 2022 |
Everyone visits Mineaki's family, which includes Mizuto's second cousin, Madoka. Madoka senses something about Yume and Mizuto and reveals even as a child, Mizuto resisted becoming close to people. Later, Yume finds Mizuto in his great-grandfather's office reading his autobiography detailing his time as a prisoner of war and meeting a Siberian woman called Elise. Mizuto suspects the book shaped his personality growing up, so he asks Yume to read it. After reading the tragic love story, Yume begins to understand Mizuto. After she asks about Mizuto's first love, Yume concludes it was Madoka. Madoka later asks if Yume is in love with Mizuto, but Yume is unsure. Madoka realizes Yume keeps finding excuses not to love Mizuto and decides to help by tricking them into spending time alone. Having read the autobiography and met Mizuto's family, Yume knows she has been selfish. Seeing her cry, Mizuto comforts her. She asks about Madoka but he denies ever loving Madoka and teases her for the mistake, causing her to laugh. As he leaves, Mizuto reiterates that his first love loved to laugh. Yume blushes at the implication she was actually Mizuto's first love.
| 12 | "I Bestow Unto You My First Kiss"; Transliteration: "Fāsuto Kisu wa Fukoku Suru" (Japanese: ファースト・キスは布告する) | Mitsutoshi Satō | Deko Akao | Keiichi Ishikura | September 21, 2022 |
Everyone attends a fireworks festival. Mizuto takes pictures with Yume's phone, somehow already knowing her password. Before the fireworks, Mizuto abruptly disappears. Madoka explains that every year, Mizuto watches the fireworks alone. Piecing together everything she has learned since becoming his stepsister, Yume realizes she never knew the real him. Mizuto reflects on how books were the only thing that made him feel any emotion until he met Yume. Yume then finds him at the shrine and reveals her phone passcode was the date of their first kiss. When she asks why he decided to date her, he admits the truth. Yume kisses Mizuto and swears she will make him her boyfriend again, somehow. Madoka is thrilled Yume made the first move. Returning to home and to school, Mizuto finds that Higashira and Kawanami are competing to be his closest friend. Yume and Mizuto both separately conclude they must move on from their past relationship and begin a new one, though it is alright to stay as stepsiblings for now.

== See also ==
- Arifureta: From Commonplace to World's Strongest, another light novel series illustrated by the same illustrator
- Sherlock Academy, another light novel series written by the same writer
