= Shirabii =

Japanese illustrator

Shirabii (しらび; born February 13) (Note: Despite the standard romanization of しらび is "Shirabi," official sources cited his name as "Shirabii" instead.) is a Japanese illustrator. His notable works include The Ryuo's Work Is Never Done! (2015–2026), Myriad Colors Phantom World (2013–2016), 86 and it's spin offs (2017–present), and Heir to a Monstermancer (2024–present). In Kono Light Novel ga Sugoi!, Shirabii ranked 8th in 2017 and 2018, and ranked 1st in 2019 and 2020. Outside of manga, he has provided an End Card Illustration for Haganai NEXT and outfit art for Fate/Grand Order

He is also the character designer of Hololive DEV_IS member Isaki Riona.
