= Kono Light Novel ga Sugoi! =

Japanese light novel guide book

- Cover of the first issue of Kono Light Novel ga Sugoi!
- Categories: Light novels
- Frequency: Annually
- Publisher: Takarajimasha
- First issue: November 26, 2004
- Country: Japan
- Language: Japanese

Kono Light Novel ga Sugoi! (このライトノベルがすごい!, Kono Raito Noberu ga Sugoi!; lit. This Light Novel is Amazing!) is an annual light novel guide book published by Takarajimasha. The guide book publishes a list of the top ten most popular light novels according to readers polled on the Internet and votes from "collaborators" (critics, influencers, and other people related to the light novel industry). An introduction to each of the works comes with each listing, along with an interview of the light novel's author or authors for first place. Many of the light novels that have been listed in this guide book were later adapted into anime series. Most of the light novels listed contain a series of volumes, but some single-volume light novels also get listed. The first release of the guide book was on November 26, 2004 and is the 2005 listing. The latest release is the 22nd volume on November 26, 2025 and is the 2026 listing.

A Certain Magical Index has appeared in the top 10 in 10 out of 19 issues, Sword Art Online has appeared in 9, Ascendance of a Bookworm appeared in 7 and Baka and Test appeared in 6. The Haruhi Suzumiya series, the Book Girl series, the Monogatari series, Bottom-tier Character Tomozaki, Classroom of the Elite and Mushoku Tensei have all appeared in 5. A Certain Magical Index and Sword Art Online also hold the longest streak in the top 10, with 9 issues in a row each. My Youth Romantic Comedy Is Wrong, As I Expected and Ascendance of a Bookworm have been ranked first 3 times, more than any other series.

The guide book also ranks male characters, female characters (both until 2025) and illustrators from all works released each year. Only on three occasions did a series rank first in all four lists in the same issue: A Certain Magical Index in 2011, My Youth Romantic Comedy Is Wrong, As I Expected in 2015, and The Angel Next Door Spoils Me Rotten in 2024.

== Hall of Fame ==
The following are series inducted into the Hall of Fame. Series in the Hall of Fame will not be considered in future rankings.

Year inducted	Title	Author	Artist	Imprint
2016	My Youth Romantic Comedy Is Wrong, As I Expected	Wataru Watari	Ponkan8	Gagaga Bunko
2020	Sword Art Online	Reki Kawahara	Abec	Dengeki Bunko
2020	A Certain Magical Index	Kazuma Kamachi	Kiyotaka Haimura	Dengeki Bunko
2020	The Ryuo's Work Is Never Done!	Shirow Shiratori	Shirabi	GA Bunko
2023	Ascendance of a Bookworm	Miya Kazuki	You Shiina	TO Books
2023	Classroom of the Elite	Shōgo Kinugasa	Shunsaku Tomose	MF Bunko J
2023	Chitose is in the Ramune Bottle	Hiromu	raemz	Gagaga Bunko

== Top 10 light novel rankings ==
=== 2005–2009 ===
Rank	Title	Author	Artist	Imprint
2005
01	Haruhi Suzumiya	Nagaru Tanigawa	Noizi Ito	Kadokawa Sneaker Bunko
02	Zaregoto	Nisio Isin	Take	Kodansha Novels
03	Akuma no Mikata	Hisamitsu Ueo	Kaori Fujita	Dengeki Bunko
04	Ryūketsu Megamiden	Shinobu Suga	Akari Funato	Cobalt Bunko
05	Baccano!	Ryohgo Narita	Katsumi Enami	Dengeki Bunko
06	Nana Hime Monogatari	Wataru Takano	Osamu Otani	Dengeki Bunko
07	Sora no Kane no Hibiku Hoshi de	Soichiro Watase	Minako Iwasaki	Dengeki Bunko
08	Allison	Keiichi Sigsawa	Kouhaku Kuroboshi	Dengeki Bunko
09	Bludgeoning Angel Dokuro-Chan	Masaki Okayu	Torishimo	Dengeki Bunko
10	Chaos Legion	Tow Ubukata	Satoru Yuiga	Fujimi Fantasia Bunko
2006
01	Zaregoto	Nisio Isin	Take	Kodansha Novels
02	Kino's Journey	Keiichi Sigsawa	Kouhaku Kuroboshi	Dengeki Bunko
03	Satōgashi no Dangan wa Uchinukenai	Kazuki Sakuraba	Mū	Fujimi Mystery Bunko
04	Sora no Kane no Hibiku Hoshi de	Soichiro Watase	Minako Iwasaki	Dengeki Bunko
05	The Ending Chronicle	Minoru Kawakami	Satoyasu	Dengeki Bunko
06	Haruhi Suzumiya	Nagaru Tanigawa	Noizi Ito	Kadokawa Sneaker Bunko
07	Watashitachi no Tamura-kun	Yuyuko Takemiya	Yasu	Dengeki Bunko
08	Saredo Sainin wa Ryū to Odoru	Rabo Asai	Kyūjyō	Kadokawa Sneaker Bunko
08	All You Need Is Kill	Hiroshi Sakurazaka	Yoshitoshi ABe	Super Dash Bunko
10	Hanbun no Tsuki ga Noboru Sora	Tsumugu Hashimoto	Keiji Yamamoto	Dengeki Bunko
2007
01	Spice and Wolf	Isuna Hasekura	Jū Ayakura	Dengeki Bunko
02	Haruhi Suzumiya	Nagaru Tanigawa	Noizi Ito	Kadokawa Sneaker Bunko
03	Zaregoto	Nisio Isin	Take	Kodansha Novels
04	Hanbun no Tsuki ga Noboru Sora	Tsumugu Hashimoto	Keiji Yamamoto	Dengeki Bunko
05	Kino's Journey	Keiichi Sigsawa	Kouhaku Kuroboshi	Dengeki Bunko
06	Toradora!	Yuyuko Takemiya	Yasu	Dengeki Bunko
07	The Ending Chronicle	Minoru Kawakami	Satoyasu	Dengeki Bunko
08	Book Girl	Mizuki Nomura	Miho Takeoka	Famitsu Bunko
09	Sora no Kane no Hibiku Hoshi de	Soichiro Watase	Minako Iwasaki	Dengeki Bunko
10	Aruhi, Bakudan ga Ochitekite	Hideyuki Furuhashi	Yukari Higa	Dengeki Bunko
2008
01	Full Metal Panic!	Shoji Gatoh	Shikidouji	Fujimi Fantasia Bunko
02	Haruhi Suzumiya	Nagaru Tanigawa	Noizi Ito	Kadokawa Sneaker Bunko
03	Book Girl	Mizuki Nomura	Miho Takeoka	Famitsu Bunko
04	Toradora!	Yuyuko Takemiya	Yasu	Dengeki Bunko
05	Spice and Wolf	Isuna Hasekura	Jū Ayakura	Dengeki Bunko
06	Kino's Journey	Keiichi Sigsawa	Kouhaku Kuroboshi	Dengeki Bunko
07	Mimizuku to Yoru no Ō	Izuki Kogyoku	Hiroo Isono	Dengeki Bunko
08	Baka and Test	Kenji Inoue	Yui Haga	Famitsu Bunko
09	Tasogareiro no Uta Tsukai series	Kei Sazane	Miho Takeoka	Fujimi Fantasia Bunko
10	Shakugan no Shana	Yashichiro Takahashi	Noizi Ito	Dengeki Bunko
2009
01	Book Girl	Mizuki Nomura	Miho Takeoka	Famitsu Bunko
02	Toradora!	Yuyuko Takemiya	Yasu	Dengeki Bunko
03	Baka and Test	Kenji Inoue	Yui Haga	Famitsu Bunko
04	A Certain Magical Index	Kazuma Kamachi	Kiyotaka Haimura	Dengeki Bunko
05	Spice and Wolf	Isuna Hasekura	Jū Ayakura	Dengeki Bunko
06	Monogatari series	Nisio Isin	Vofan	Kodansha Box
07	Student Council's Discretion	Sekina Aoi	Kira Inugami	Fujimi Fantasia Bunko
08	Full Metal Panic!	Shoji Gatoh	Shikidouji	Fujimi Fantasia Bunko
09	Usotsuki Mii-kun to Kowareta Maa-chan	Hitoma Iruma	Hidari	Dengeki Bunko
10	The Princess and the Pilot	Koroku Inumura	Haruyuki Morisawa	Gagaga Bunko

=== 2010–2014 ===
Rank	Title	Author	Artist	Imprint
2010
01	Baka and Test	Kenji Inoue	Yui Haga	Famitsu Bunko
02	Monogatari series	Nisio Isin	Vofan	Kodansha Box
03	Book Girl	Mizuki Nomura	Miho Takeoka	Famitsu Bunko
04	Toradora!	Yuyuko Takemiya	Yasu	Dengeki Bunko
05	Student Council's Discretion	Sekina Aoi	Kira Inugami	Fujimi Fantasia Bunko
06	Tasogareiro no Uta Tsukai	Sazane Kei	Miho Takeoka	Fujimi Fantasia Bunko
07	Usotsuki Mii-kun to Kowareta Maa-chan	Hitoma Iruma	Hidari	Dengeki Bunko
08	Ben-To	Asaura	Kaito Shibano	Super Dash Bunko
09	A Certain Magical Index	Kazuma Kamachi	Kiyotaka Haimura	Dengeki Bunko
10	Sōkyū no Karma	Kōshi Tachibana	Haruyuki Morisawa	Fujimi Fantasia Bunko
2011
01	A Certain Magical Index	Kazuma Kamachi	Kiyotaka Haimura	Dengeki Bunko
02	Haganai	Yomi Hirasaka	Buriki	MF Bunko J
03	Baka and Test	Kenji Inoue	Yui Haga	Famitsu Bunko
04	Sword Art Online	Reki Kawahara	Abec	Dengeki Bunko
05	Ben-To	Asaura	Kaito Shibano	Super Dash Bunko
06	Book Girl	Mizuki Nomura	Miho Takeoka	Famitsu Bunko
07	Student Council's Discretion	Sekina Aoi	Kira Inugami	Fujimi Fantasia Bunko
08	Oreimo	Tsukasa Fushimi	Hiro Kanzaki	Dengeki Bunko
09	Durarara!!	Ryohgo Narita	Suzuhito Yasuda	Dengeki Bunko
10	Heaven's Memo Pad	Hikaru Sugii	Mel Kishida	Dengeki Bunko
2012
01	Sword Art Online	Reki Kawahara	Abec	Dengeki Bunko
02	A Certain Magical Index	Kazuma Kamachi	Kiyotaka Haimura	Dengeki Bunko
03	Ben-To	Asaura	Kaito Shibano	Super Dash Bunko
04	Circlet Girl	Satoshi Hase	Miyū	Kadokawa Sneaker Bunko
05	Baka and Test	Kenji Inoue	Yui Haga	Famitsu Bunko
06	Haganai	Yomi Hirasaka	Buriki	MF Bunko J
07	Occultologic	Tsukasa Nimeguchi	Magomago	Kadokawa Sneaker Bunko
08	Haruhi Suzumiya	Nagaru Tanigawa	Noizi Ito	Kadokawa Sneaker Bunko
09	Idolising!	Sakaki Hirozawa	Cuteg	Dengeki Bunko
10	Iris on Rainy Days	Takeshi Matsuyama	Hirasato	Dengeki Bunko
2013
01	Sword Art Online	Reki Kawahara	Abec	Dengeki Bunko
02	A Certain Magical Index	Kazuma Kamachi	Kiyotaka Haimura	Dengeki Bunko
03	Rokka: Braves of the Six Flowers	Ishio Yamagata	Miyagi	Super Dash Bunko
04	Baka and Test	Kenji Inoue	Yui Haga	Famitsu Bunko
05	Oreimo	Tsukasa Fushimi	Hiro Kanzaki	Dengeki Bunko
06	My Youth Romantic Comedy Is Wrong, As I Expected	Wataru Watari	Ponkan8	Gagaga Bunko
07	Durarara!!	Ryohgo Narita	Suzuhito Yasuda	Dengeki Bunko
08	Shinonome Yūko wa Tanpen Shōsetsu o Aishiteiru	Bingo Morihashi	Nardack	Famitsu Bunko
09	Sakurada Reset	Yutaka Kōno	You Shiina	Kadokawa Sneaker Bunko
10	Horizon in the Middle of Nowhere	Minoru Kawakami	Satoyasu	Dengeki Bunko
2014
01	My Youth Romantic Comedy Is Wrong, As I Expected	Wataru Watari	Ponkan8	Gagaga Bunko
02	Alderamin on the Sky	Bokuto Uno	Sanbasō	Dengeki Bunko
03	A Certain Magical Index	Kazuma Kamachi	Kiyotaka Haimura	Dengeki Bunko
04	Is It Wrong to Try to Pick Up Girls in a Dungeon?	Fujino Omori	Suzuhito Yasuda	GA Bunko
05	Sword Art Online	Reki Kawahara	Abec	Dengeki Bunko
06	The Devil Is a Part-Timer!	Satoshi Wagahara	Oniku	Dengeki Bunko
07	Tokyo Ravens	Kōhei Azano	Sumihei	Fujimi Fantasia Bunko
08	Rokka: Braves of the Six Flowers	Ishio Yamagata	Miyagi	Super Dash Bunko
09	Oreimo	Tsukasa Fushimi	Hiro Kanzaki	Dengeki Bunko
10	No Game No Life	Yū Kamiya		MF Bunko J

=== 2015–2016 ===
Rank	Title	Author	Artist	Imprint
2015
01	My Youth Romantic Comedy Is Wrong, As I Expected	Wataru Watari	Ponkan8	Gagaga Bunko
02	Sword Art Online	Reki Kawahara	Abec	Dengeki Bunko
03	No Game No Life	Yū Kamiya		MF Bunko J
04	A Certain Magical Index	Kazuma Kamachi	Kiyotaka Haimura	Dengeki Bunko
05	Kōkyū Rakuen Kyūjō: Harem League Baseball	Hiroshi Ishikawa	Wingheart	Super Dash Bunko
06	Zesshinkai no Solaris	Rakiruchi	Asagiri	MF Bunko J
07	Escape Speed	Nozomu Kuoka	Gin	Dengeki Bunko
08	Toaru Hikūshi e no Seiyaku	Koroku Inumura	Haruyuki Morisawa	Gagaga Bunko
09	Kono Koi to, Sono Mirai	Bingo Morihashi	Nardack	Famitsu Bunko
10	Alderamin on the Sky	Bokuto Uno	Sanbasō	Dengeki Bunko
2016
01	My Youth Romantic Comedy Is Wrong, As I Expected	Wataru Watari	Ponkan8	Gagaga Bunko
02	Sword Art Online	Reki Kawahara	Abec	Dengeki Bunko
03	Alderamin on the Sky	Bokuto Uno	Sanbasō	Dengeki Bunko
04	Eirun Last Code: Kakuu Sekai yori Senjou e	Ryuunosuke Azuma	Mikoto Akemi	MF Bunko J
05	WorldEnd	Akira Kareno	ue	Kadokawa Sneaker Bunko
06	No Game No Life	Yū Kamiya		MF Bunko J
07	A Certain Magical Index	Kazuma Kamachi	Kiyotaka Haimura	Dengeki Bunko
08	Is It Wrong to Try to Pick Up Girls in a Dungeon?	Fujino Omori	Suzuhito Yasuda	GA Bunko
09	Saekano: How to Raise a Boring Girlfriend	Fumiaki Maruto	Kurehito Misaki	Fujimi Fantasia Bunko
10	Escape Speed	Nozomu Kuoka	Gin	Dengeki Bunko

=== 2017–2019 ===
Format	Rank	Title	Author	Artist	Imprint
2017
Bunkobon
Bunkobon	01	The Ryuo's Work Is Never Done!	Shirow Shiratori	Shirabi	GA Bunko
Bunkobon	02	Re:Zero − Starting Life in Another World	Tappei Nagatsuki	Shinichirou Ootsuka	MF Bunko J
Bunkobon	03	A Certain Magical Index	Kazuma Kamachi	Kiyotaka Haimura	Dengeki Bunko
Bunkobon	04	Sword Art Online	Reki Kawahara	Abec	Dengeki Bunko
Bunkobon	05	Goblin Slayer	Kumo Kagyuu	Noboru Kannatsuki	GA Bunko
Bunkobon	06	Melody Lyrik Idol Magik	Hiroshi Ishikawa	POO	Dash X Bunko
Bunkobon	07	Gamers!	Sekina Aoi	Saboten	Fujimi Fantasia Bunko
Bunkobon	08	Bottom-tier Character Tomozaki	Yūki Yaku	Fly	Gagaga Bunko
Bunkobon	09	KonoSuba	Natsume Akatsuki	Kurone Mishima	Kadokawa Sneaker Bunko
Bunkobon	10	Kono Koi to, Sono Mirai	Bingo Morihashi	Nardack	Famitsu Bunko
Tankōbon
Tankōbon	01	Overlord	Kugane Maruyama	so-bin	Enterbrain
Tankōbon	02	Monogatari series	Nisio Isin	Vofan	Kodansha Box
Tankōbon	03	So I'm a Spider, So What?	Okina Baba	Tsukasa Kiryū	Kadokawa Books
Tankōbon	04	Mushoku Tensei: Jobless Reincarnation	Rifujin na Magonote	Shirotaka	MF Books
Tankōbon	05	Ascendance of a Bookworm	Miya Kazuki	You Shiina	TO BOOKS
Tankōbon	06	Ninja Slayer	Bradley Bond, Philip N. Morzez	Warainaku	Kadokawa
Tankōbon	07	Kyūketsuki ni Natta Kimi wa Eien no Ai o Hajimeru: Long Long Engage	Mizuki Nomura	Miho Takeoka	Famitsu Bunko
Tankōbon	08	That Time I Got Reincarnated as a Slime	Fuse	Mitz Vah	GC Novels
Tankōbon	09	Bōkyaku Tantei series	Nisio Isin	Vofan	Kodansha Bungei
Tankōbon	10	Kono Sekai ga Game da to Boku dake ga Shitteiru	Usbar	Ichizen	Enterbrain
2018
Bunkobon
Bunkobon	01	The Ryuo's Work Is Never Done!	Shirow Shiratori	Shirabi	GA Bunko
Bunkobon	02	86	Asato Asato	Shirabi	Dengeki Bunko
Bunkobon	03	Infinite Dendrogram	Sakon Kaidō	Taiki	HJ Bunko
Bunkobon	04	Irina: The Vampire Cosmonaut	Keisuke Masano	Karei	Gagaga Bunko
Bunkobon	05	Sword Art Online	Reki Kawahara	Abec	Dengeki Bunko
Bunkobon	06	Remake Our Life!	Nachi Kio	Eretto	MF Bunko J
Bunkobon	07	Bottom-tier Character Tomozaki	Yūki Yaku	Fly	Gagaga Bunko
Bunkobon	08	Gamers!	Sekina Aoi	Saboten	Fujimi Fantasia Bunko
Bunkobon	09	Is It Wrong to Try to Pick Up Girls in a Dungeon?	Fujino Omori	Suzuhito Yasuda	GA Bunko
Bunkobon	10	A Sister's All You Need	Yomi Hirasaka	Kantoku	Gagaga Bunko
Tankōbon
Tankōbon	01	Ascendance of a Bookworm	Miya Kazuki	You Shiina	TO BOOKS
Tankōbon	02	So I'm a Spider, So What?	Okina Baba	Tsukasa Kiryū	Kadokawa Books
Tankōbon	03	The Saga of Tanya the Evil	Carlo Zen	Shinobu Shinotsuki	Enterbrain
Tankōbon	04	Overlord	Kugane Maruyama	so-bin	Enterbrain
Tankōbon	05	Monogatari series	Nisio Isin	Vofan	Kodansha Box
Tankōbon	06	That Time I Got Reincarnated as a Slime	Fuse	Mitz Vah	GC Novels
Tankōbon	07	Mushoku Tensei: Jobless Reincarnation	Rifujin na Magonote	Shirotaka	MF Books
Tankōbon	08	Yokohama Station SF	Yuba Isukari	Tatsuyuki Tanaka	Kadokawa Books
Tankōbon	09	Wandering Witch: The Journey of Elaina	Jōgi Shiraishi	Azul	GA Novel
Tankōbon	10	If It's for My Daughter, I'd Even Defeat a Demon Lord	Chirolu	Kei	HJ Books
2019
Bunkobon
Bunkobon	01	Sabikui Bisco	Shinji Kobukubo	Akagishi K	Dengeki Bunko
Bunkobon	02	The Ryuo's Work Is Never Done!	Shirow Shiratori	Shirabi	GA Bunko
Bunkobon	03	Bottom-tier Character Tomozaki	Yūki Yaku	Fly	Gagaga Bunko
Bunkobon	04	Higehiro: After Being Rejected, I Shaved and Took In a High School Runaway	Shimesaba	Booota	Kadokawa Sneaker Bunko
Bunkobon	05	86	Asato Asato	Shirabi	Dengeki Bunko
Bunkobon	06	Classroom of the Elite	Shōgo Kinugasa	Shunsaku Tomose	MF Bunko J
Bunkobon	07	Remake Our Life!	Nachi Kio	Eretto	MF Bunko J
Bunkobon	08	Sankaku no Kyori wa Kagiri Nai Zero	Saginomiya Misaki	Hiten	Dengeki Bunko
Bunkobon	09	A Certain Magical Index	Kazuma Kamachi	Kiyotaka Haimura	Dengeki Bunko
Bunkobon	10	Sword Art Online	Reki Kawahara	Abec	Dengeki Bunko
Tankōbon
Tankōbon	01	Ascendance of a Bookworm	Miya Kazuki	You Shiina	TO BOOKS
Tankōbon	02	Umibe no Byōin de Kanojo to Hanashita Ikutsuka no Koto	Hiroshi Ishikawa	Mai Yoneyama	Kadokawa
Tankōbon	03	Monogatari series	Nisio Isin	Vofan	Kodansha Box
Tankōbon	04	Overlord	Kugane Maruyama	so-bin	Enterbrain
Tankōbon	05	That Time I Got Reincarnated as a Slime	Fuse	Mitz Vah	GC Novels
Tankōbon	06	Wandering Witch: The Journey of Elaina	Jogi Shiraishi	Azul	GA Novel
Tankōbon	07	JK Haru is a Sex Worker in Another World	Ko Hiratori	Shimano	Hayakawa Publishing
Tankōbon	08	Mushoku Tensei: Jobless Reincarnation	Rifujin na Magonote	Shirotaka	MF Books
Tankōbon	09	I've Been Killing Slimes for 300 Years and Maxed Out My Level	Kisetsu Morita	Benio	GA Novel
Tankōbon	10	So I'm a Spider, So What?	Okina Baba	Tsukasa Kiryū	Kadokawa Books

=== 2020–2024 ===
Format	Rank	Title	Author	Artist	Imprint
2020
Bunkobon
Bunkobon	01	Reign of the Seven Spellblades	Bokuto Uno	Ruria Miyuki	Dengeki Bunko
Bunkobon	02	The Ryuo's Work Is Never Done!	Shirow Shiratori	Shirabi	GA Bunko
Bunkobon	03	Bottom-tier Character Tomozaki	Yūki Yaku	Fly	Gagaga Bunko
Bunkobon	04	Classroom of the Elite	Shōgo Kinugasa	Shunsaku Tomose	MF Bunko J
Bunkobon	05	Osamake: Romcom Where The Childhood Friend Won't Lose	Shūichi Nimaru	Shigure Ui	Dengeki Bunko
Bunkobon	06	Rascal Does Not Dream of Bunny Girl Senpai	Hajime Kamoshida	Keeji Mizoguchi	Dengeki Bunko
Bunkobon	07	My Stepmom's Daughter Is My Ex	Kyōsuke Kamishiro	Takayaki	Kadokawa Sneaker Bunko
Bunkobon	08	Kimi no Wasurekata o Oshiete	Mirito Amasaki	Fly	Kadokawa Sneaker Bunko
Bunkobon	09	The Tunnel to Summer, the Exit of Goodbye	Mokune Hachi	Kukka	Gagaga Bunko
Bunkobon	10	The Angel Next Door Spoils Me Rotten	Saekisan	Hazano Kazutake	GA Bunko
Tankōbon
Tankōbon	01	Unnamed Memory	Kuji Furumiya	chibi	Dengeki no Shin Bungei
Tankōbon	02	Ascendance of a Bookworm	Miya Kazuki	You Shiina	TO BOOKS
Tankōbon	03	The Eminence in Shadow	Daisuke Aizawa	Tōzai	Enterbrain
Tankōbon	04	Mushoku Tensei: Jobless Reincarnation	Rifujin na Magonote	Shirotaka	MF Books
Tankōbon	05	Rebuild World	Nafuse	Gin	Dengeki no Shin Bungei
Tankōbon	06	Wandering Witch: The Journey of Elaina	Jogi Shiraishi	Azul	GA Novel
Tankōbon	07	That Time I Got Reincarnated as a Slime	Fuse	Mitz Vah	GC Novels
Tankōbon	08	Trapped in a Dating Sim: The World of Otome Games is Tough for Mobs	Yomu Mishima	Monda	GC Novels
Tankōbon	09	So I'm a Spider, So What?	Okina Baba	Tsukasa Kiryū	Kadokawa Books
Tankōbon	10	Endo and Kobayashi Live! The Latest on Tsundere Villainess Lieselotte	Suzu Enoshima	Eihi	Kadokawa Books
2021
Bunkobon
Bunkobon	01	Chitose is in the Ramune Bottle	Hiromu	raemz	Gagaga Bunko
Bunkobon	02	Spy Classroom	Takemachi	Tomari	Fantasia Bunko
Bunkobon	03	Classroom of the Elite	Shōgo Kinugasa	Shunsaku Tomose	MF Bunko J
Bunkobon	04	The Detective Is Already Dead	Nigojū	Umibōzu	MF Bunko J
Bunkobon	05	My Stepmom's Daughter Is My Ex	Kamishiro Kyousuke	Takayaki	Kadokawa Sneaker Bunko
Bunkobon	06	Rakuen Noise	Hikaru Sugii	Shunkafuyu Yuu	Dengeki Bunko
Bunkobon	07	Bottom-tier Character Tomozaki	Yūki Yaku	Fly	Gagaga Bunko
Bunkobon	08	I Kissed My Girlfriend's Little Sister?!	Riku Misora	Mizore Saba	GA Bunko
Bunkobon	09	Propeller Opera	Koroku Inumura	Hitomi Shizuki	Gagaga Bunko
Bunkobon	10	The Angel Next Door Spoils Me Rotten	Saekisan	Hazano Kazutake	GA Bunko
Tankōbon
Tankōbon	01	Ishura	Keiso	Kureta	Dengeki no Shin Bungei
Tankōbon	02	Ascendance of a Bookworm	Miya Kazuki	You Shiina	TO BOOKS
Tankōbon	03	Unnamed Memory	Kuji Furumiya	chibi	Dengeki no Shin Bungei
Tankōbon	04	Rebuild World	Nafuse	Gin	Dengeki no Shin Bungei
Tankōbon	05	Babel	Kuji Furumiya	Haruyuki Morisawa	Dengeki Novel
Tankōbon	06	Tearmoon Empire	Nozomu Mochizuki	Gilse	TO BOOKS
Tankōbon	07	Let This Grieving Soul Retire! Woe is the Weakling Who Leads the Strongest Party	Tsukikage	Chyko	GC Novels
Tankōbon	08	Afumi no Umi: Suimen ga Yureru Toki	Israfil	Foo Midori	TO BOOKS
Tankōbon	09	Dahlia in Bloom: Crafting a Fresh Start with Magical Tools	Hisaya Amagishi	Kei	MF Books
Tankōbon	10	Wandering Witch: The Journey of Elaina	Jogi Shiraishi	Azul	GA Novel
2022
Bunkobon
Bunkobon	01	Chitose is in the Ramune Bottle	Hiromu	raemz	Gagaga Bunko
Bunkobon	02	Agents of the Four Seasons	Kana Akatsuki	Suou	Dengeki Bunko
Bunkobon	03	Classroom of the Elite	Shōgo Kinugasa	Shunsaku Tomose	MF Bunko J
Bunkobon	04	The Mimosa Confessions	Mei Hachimoku	Kukka	Gagaga Bunko
Bunkobon	05	Propeller Opera	Koroku Inumura	Hitomi Shizuki	Gagaga Bunko
Bunkobon	06	The Angel Next Door Spoils Me Rotten	Saekisan	Hazano Kazutake	GA Bunko
Bunkobon	07	Days with My Stepsister	Ghost Mikawa	Hiten	MF Bunko J
Bunkobon	08	The Detective Is Already Dead	Nigojū	Umibōzu	MF Bunko J
Bunkobon	09	Alya Sometimes Hides Her Feelings in Russian	Sunsunsun	Momoco	Kadokawa Sneaker Bunko
Bunkobon	10	Bullet Code: Firewall	Suzu Saitou	Wata	Dengeki Bunko
Tankōbon
Tankōbon	01	Sasaki and Peeps	Buncololi	Kantoku	MF Bunko J
Tankōbon	02	Secrets of the Silent Witch	Matsuri Isora	Nanna Fujimi	Kadokawa Books
Tankōbon	03	Ascendance of a Bookworm	Miya Kazuki	You Shiina	TO BOOKS
Tankōbon	04	Rebuild World	Nafuse	Gin	Dengeki no Shin Bungei
Tankōbon	05	Ishura	Keiso	Kureta	Dengeki no Shin Bungei
Tankōbon	06	Babel	Kuji Furumiya	Haruyuki Morisawa	Dengeki Novel
Tankōbon	07	The Exo-drive Reincarcation Games: All-Japan Isekai Battle Tournament!	Keiso	Tsukasa Kiryuu zunta	Dengeki no Shin Bungei
Tankōbon	08	Modern Villainess: It’s Not Easy Building a Corporate Empire Before the Crash	Tofuro Futsukaichi	Kei	Overlap Novels
Tankōbon	09	Dahlia in Bloom: Crafting a Fresh Start with Magical Tools	Hisaya Amagishi	Kei	MF Books
Tankōbon	10	Boku wa Saiseisu, Boku wa Shi	Hiroshi Ishikawa	Kureta	Kadokawa no Shin Bungei
2023
Bunkobon
Bunkobon	01	Classroom of the Elite	Shōgo Kinugasa	Shunsaku Tomose	MF Bunko J
Bunkobon	02	Chitose is in the Ramune Bottle	Hiromu	raemz	Gagaga Bunko
Bunkobon	03	Watashi wa anata no Namida ni Naritai	Shiki Taiga	Sue Yanagi	Gagaga Bunko
Bunkobon	04	The Angel Next Door Spoils Me Rotten	Saekisan	Hazano Kazutake	GA Bunko
Bunkobon	05	Alya Sometimes Hides Her Feelings in Russian	Sunsunsun	Momoco	Kadokawa Sneaker Bunko
Bunkobon	06	Brunhild The Dragonslayer	Eiko Agarizaki	Aoaso	Dengeki Bunko
Bunkobon	07	I'm Fine With Being the Second Girlfriend	You Saijou	Re:Dake	Dengeki Bunko
Bunkobon	08	Spy Classroom	Takemachi	Tomari	Fujimi Fantasia Bunko
Bunkobon	09	Days with My Stepsister	Ghost Mikawa	Hiten	MF Bunko J
Bunkobon	10	The Detective Is Already Dead	Nigojū	Umibōzu	MF Bunko J
Tankōbon
Tankōbon	01	Ascendance of a Bookworm	Miya Kazuki	You Shiina	TO BOOKS
Tankōbon	02	Dahlia in Bloom: Crafting a Fresh Start with Magical Tools	Hisaya Amagishi	Kei	MF Books
Tankōbon	03	Sentenced to Be a Hero	Rocket Shoukai	Mephisto	Dengeki no Shin Bungei
Tankōbon	04	Secrets of the Silent Witch	Matsuri Isora	Nanna Fujimi	Kadokawa Books
Tankōbon	05	Mushoku Tensei: Jobless Reincarnation	Rifujin na Magonote	Shirotaka	MF Books
Tankōbon	06	The Person I Loved Asked Me to Die in My Sister's Stead	Mizuki Nagano	Saori Toyota	TO BOOKS
Tankōbon	07	Sasaki and Peeps	Buncololi	Kantoku	MF Bunko J
Tankōbon	08	My Contract With the Apothecary Monster	Ayaka Sakuraze	As	TO BOOKS
Tankōbon	09	Overlord	Kugane Maruyama	so-bin	Enterbrain
Tankōbon	10	Tensei Reijo to Suki na Jinsei wo	Kamihara	Shiro46	Hayakawa Bunko JA
2024
Bunkobon
Bunkobon	01	The Angel Next Door Spoils Me Rotten	Saekisan	Hazano Kazutake	GA Bunko
Bunkobon	02	Playing Death Games to Put Food on the Table	Yuuji Ukai	Necometal	MF Bunko J
Bunkobon	03	Alya Sometimes Hides Her Feelings in Russian	Sunsunsun	Momoco	Kadokawa Sneaker Bunko
Bunkobon	04	Bathtub de Kurasu	Shiki Taiga	Sue Yanagi	Gagaga Bunko
Bunkobon	05	Toumei na Yoru ni Kakeru Kimi to, Me ni Mienai Koi wo Shita.	Shima Nanigashi	raemz	GA Bunko
Bunkobon	06	Stella Step	Hayashi Hoshisatoru	Ankotaku	MF Bunko J
Bunkobon	07	Bokura wa “Yomi” wo Machigaeru	Mikazuki Hizuri	Polygon.	Kadokawa Senaker Bunko
Bunkobon	08	Koibito Ijou no Koto wo, Kanojo ja Nai Kimi to.	Yuba Mochizaki	Doushima	Gagaga Bunko
Bunkobon	09	Buying a Classmate Once a Week	Haneda Usa	U35	Fujimi Fantasia Bunko
Bunkobon	10	The Detective Is Already Dead	Nigojū	Umibōzu	MF Bunko J
Tankōbon
Tankōbon	01	The Person I Loved Asked Me to Die in My Sister's Stead	Nagano Mizuki	Toyota Saori	TO BOOKS
Tankōbon	02	A Tale of the Secret Saint	Touya	chibi	Earth Star Novel
Tankōbon	03	The Villainess's Guide to (Not) Falling in Love	Touya	Yoimachi	SQEX Novel
Tankōbon	04	Mushoku Tensei: Jobless Reincarnation	Rifujin na Magonote	Shirotaka	MF Books
Tankōbon	05	7th Time Loop	Touko Amekawa	Wan Hachipisu	Overlap Novels f
Tankōbon	06	That Time I Got Reincarnated as a Slime	Fuse	Mitz Vah	GC Novels
Tankōbon	07	The Eminence in Shadow	Daisuke Aizawa	Tōzai	Enterbrain
Tankōbon	08	Before the Tutorial Starts: A Few Things I Can Do to Keep the Bosses Alive	Kotatsu Takahashi	Kakao Lantern	Dengeki no Shin Bungei
Tankōbon	09	Arasa ga VTuber ni Natta Hanashi	Tokumei	Karasu BTK	Enterbrain
Tankōbon	10	Let This Grieving Soul Retire! Woe is the Weakling Who Leads the Strongest Party	Tsukikage	Chyko	GC Novels

=== 2025–2029 ===
Format	Rank	Title	Author	Artist	Imprint
2025
Bunkobon
Bunkobon	01	Too Many Losing Heroines!	Takibi Amamori	Imigimuru	Gagaga Bunko
Bunkobon	02	Who Killed the Hero?	Daken	Toi8	Kadokawa Sneaker Bunko
Bunkobon	03	Alya Sometimes Hides Her Feelings in Russian	SunSunSun	Momoco	Kadokawa Sneaker Bunko
Bunkobon	04	This Is the End Stagnation Committee	Aiencien	Ogipote	Dengeki Bunko
Bunkobon	05	The Angel Next Door Spoils Me Rotten	Saekisan	Hazano Kazutake	GA Bunko
Bunkobon	06	Shiroki Teikoku	Koroku Inumura	Kotarō	Gagaga Bunko
Bunkobon	07	Kono Monogatari o Kimi ni Sasagu	Hinata Mori	Nun Yukimaru	Kodansha Ranobe Bunko
Bunkobon	08	Days with My Stepsister	Ghost Mikawa	Hiten	MF Bunko J
Bunkobon	09	Hoshi ga Hatetemo Kimi wa Nare	Kuryu Nagayama	Sakinoji	Dengeki Bunko
Bunkobon	10	Hihō: Ojō-sama-kei Teihen Dungeon Haishin-sha	Hirotaka Akagi	Fuku Fox	Gagaga Bunko
Tankōbon
Tankōbon	01	Dahlia in Bloom: Crafting a Fresh Start with Magical Tools	Hisaya Amagishi	Kei	MF Books
Tankōbon	02	A Tale of the Secret Saint	Touya	chibi	Earth Star Novel
Tankōbon	03	The Villainess's Guide to (Not) Falling in Love	Touya	Yoimachi	SQEX Novel
Tankōbon	04	Mahō Tsukai no Hikkoshiya	Yusaku Sakaichi	Haru Ichikawa	Kadokawa Books
Tankōbon	05	The Person I Loved Asked Me to Die in My Sister's Stead	Mizuki Nagano	Saori Toyota	TO BOOKS
Tankōbon	06	Let This Grieving Soul Retire! Woe is the Weakling Who Leads the Strongest Party	Tsukikage	Chyko	GC Novels
Tankōbon	07	7th Time Loop: The Villainess Enjoys a Carefree Life Married to Her Worst Enemy!	Touko Amekawa	Wan Hachipisu	Overlap Novels f
Tankōbon	08	Hikikomori VTuber wa Tsutaetai	Megusuri	popman3580	Dengeki no Shin Bungei
Tankōbon	09	That Time I Got Reincarnated as a Slime	Fuse	Mitz Vah	GC Novels
Tankōbon	10	The Eminence in Shadow	Daisuke Aizawa	Tōzai	Enterbrain
2026
Bunkobon
Bunkobon	01	Playful Relationships	Sekina Aoi	Kurehito Misaki	Fujimi Fantasia Bunko
Bunkobon	02	The Angel Next Door Spoils Me Rotten	Saekisan	Hazano Kazutake	GA Bunko
Bunkobon	03	Too Many Losing Heroines!	Takibi Amamori	Imigimuru	Gagaga Bunko
Bunkobon	04	Alya Sometimes Hides Her Feelings in Russian	SunSunSun	Momoco	Kadokawa Sneaker Bunko
Bunkobon	05	Tensei Teido de Mune no Ana wa Umanaranai	Niteron	Isshiki	Dengeki Bunko
Bunkobon	06	Therefore, First Love Was Proven	Takuma Sakai	Asagi Tōsaka	Dengeki Bunko
Bunkobon	07	Middle Note ni Sayonara	Uraura Tachikawa	Kaeru Ouchi	Gagaga Bunko
Bunkobon	08	This Is the End Stagnation Committee	Aiencien	Ogipote	Dengeki Bunko
Bunkobon	09	The Apothecary Diaries	Hyūganatsu	Touko Shino	Ray Books
Bunkobon	10	Is It Wrong to Try to Pick Up Girls in a Dungeon?	Fujino Ōmori	Suzuhito Yasuda	GA Bunko
Tankōbon
Tankōbon	01	Secrets of the Silent Witch	Matsuri Isora	Nanna Fujimi	Kadokawa Books
Tankōbon	02	A Tale of the Secret Saint	Touya	Chibi	Earth Star Novel
Tankōbon	03	Dahlia in Bloom: Crafting a Fresh Start With Magical Tools	Hisaya Amagishi	Kei	MF Books
Tankōbon	04	That Time I Got Reincarnated as a Slime	Fuse	Mitz Vah	GC Novels
Tankōbon	05	The Villainess's Guide to (Not) Falling in Love	Touya	Yoimachi	SQEX Novel
Tankōbon	06	Nanji, An-kun o Aiseyo	Kentarō Honjō	Toi8	DRE Novels
Tankōbon	07	A Tale of the Secret Saint Zero	Touya	Chibi	Earth Star Novel
Tankōbon	08	Meikyū Kuso Tawake	Iwatoo	Yūki Fuyuno	Dangan Bunko
Tankōbon	09	The Person I Loved Asked Me to Die in My Sister's Stead	Mizuki Nagano	Saori Toyota	TO Books
Tankōbon	10	History of the Kingdom of the Orcsen: How the Barbarian Orcish Nation Came to Burn Down the Peaceful Elfland	Kyōichirō Tarumi	Thores Shibamoto	Saga Forest

== Top 10 female characters rankings (until 2025) ==
Year	Character	Title	Author	Artist	Imprint
2005	Dokuro Mitsukai	Bludgeoning Angel Dokuro-Chan	Masaki Okayu	Torishimo	Dengeki Bunko
2006	Kino	Kino's Journey	Keiichi Sigsawa	Kouhaku Kuroboshi	Dengeki Bunko
2007	Holo	Spice and Wolf	Isuna Hasekura	Jū Ayakura	Dengeki Bunko
2008	Haruhi Suzumiya	Haruhi Suzumiya series	Nagaru Tanigawa	Noizi Ito	Kadokawa Sneaker Bunko
2009	Tohko Amano	Book Girl series	Mizuki Nomura	Miho Takeoka	Famitsu Bunko
2010	Mikoto Misaka	A Certain Magical Index	Kazuma Kamachi	Kiyotaka Haimura	Dengeki Bunko
2011	Mikoto Misaka	A Certain Magical Index	Kazuma Kamachi	Kiyotaka Haimura	Dengeki Bunko
2012	Mikoto Misaka	A Certain Magical Index	Kazuma Kamachi	Kiyotaka Haimura	Dengeki Bunko
2013	Mikoto Misaka	A Certain Magical Index	Kazuma Kamachi	Kiyotaka Haimura	Dengeki Bunko
2014	Mikoto Misaka	A Certain Magical Index	Kazuma Kamachi	Kiyotaka Haimura	Dengeki Bunko
2015	Yukino Yukinoshita	My Youth Romantic Comedy Is Wrong, As I Expected	Wataru Watari	Ponkan8	Gagaga Bunko
2016	Mikoto Misaka	A Certain Magical Index	Kazuma Kamachi	Kiyotaka Haimura	Dengeki Bunko
2017	Mikoto Misaka	A Certain Magical Index	Kazuma Kamachi	Kiyotaka Haimura	Dengeki Bunko
2018	Mikoto Misaka	A Certain Magical Index	Kazuma Kamachi	Kiyotaka Haimura	Dengeki Bunko
2019	Mikoto Misaka	A Certain Magical Index	Kazuma Kamachi	Kiyotaka Haimura	Dengeki Bunko
2020	Kei Karuizawa	Classroom of the Elite	Shōgo Kinugasa	Shunsaku Tomose	MF Bunko J
2021	Kei Karuizawa	Classroom of the Elite	Shōgo Kinugasa	Shunsaku Tomose	MF Bunko J
2022	Mahiru Shiina	The Angel Next Door Spoils Me Rotten	Saekisan	Hazano Kazutake	GA Bunko
2023	Mahiru Shiina	The Angel Next Door Spoils Me Rotten	Saekisan	Hazano Kazutake	GA Bunko
2024	Mahiru Shiina	The Angel Next Door Spoils Me Rotten	Saekisan	Hazano Kazutake	GA Bunko
2025	Mahiru Shiina	The Angel Next Door Spoils Me Rotten	Saekisan	Hazano Kazutake	GA Bunko

=== 2005–2009 ===
Rank	Character	Title	Author	Artist	Imprint
2005
01	Dokuro Mitsukai	Bludgeoning Angel Dokuro-Chan	Masaki Okayu	Torishimo	Dengeki Bunko
02	Yomiko Readman	Read or Die	Hideyuki Kurata	Taraku Uon	Super Dash Bunko
03	Yuki Nagato	Haruhi Suzumiya	Nagaru Tanigawa	Noizi Ito	Kadokawa Sneaker Bunko
04	Haruhi Suzumiya	Haruhi Suzumiya	Nagaru Tanigawa	Noizi Ito	Kadokawa Sneaker Bunko
05	Allison Whittington	Allison	Keiichi Sigsawa	Kouhaku Kuroboshi	Dengeki Bunko
06	Tazusa Sakurano	Ginban Kaleidoscope	Rei Kaibara	Hiro Suzuhira	Super Dash Bunko
07	Sorasumihime	Nanahime Monogatari	Kazu Takano	Osamu Otani	Dengeki Bunko
08	Victorique de Blois	Gosick	Kazuki Sakuraba	Hinata Takeda	Kadokawa Beans Bunko
09	Shana	Shakugan no Shana	Yashichiro Takahashi	Noizi Ito	Dengeki Bunko
10	Danatia Aryl Ankurouge	Rakuen no Majo Tachi	Satomi Kikawa	Mūnī Mutchiri	Cobalt Bunko
2006
01	Kino	Kino's Journey	Keiichi Sigsawa	Kouhaku Kuroboshi	Dengeki Bunko
02	Yuki Nagato	Haruhi Suzumiya	Nagaru Tanigawa	Noizi Ito	Kadokawa Sneaker Bunko
03	Victorique de Blois	Gosick	Kazuki Sakuraba	Hinata Takeda	Kadokawa Beans Bunko
04	Haruhi Suzumiya	Haruhi Suzumiya	Nagaru Tanigawa	Noizi Ito	Kadokawa Sneaker Bunko
05	Shana	Shakugan no Shana	Yashichiro Takahashi	Noizi Ito	Dengeki Bunko
06	Rika Akiba	Hanbun no Tsuki ga Noboru Sora	Tsumugu Hashimoto	Keiji Yamamoto	Dengeki Bunko
07	Hiroka Sōma	Watashitachi no Tamura-kun	Yuyuko Takemiya	Yasu	Dengeki Bunko
08	Yomiko Togano	Missing	Gakuto Coda	Shin Midorigawa	Dengeki Bunko
09	Kaho Sakazaki	Modern Magic Made Simple	Hiroshi Sakurazaka	Miki Miyashita	Super Dash Bunko
10	Eguriko Gankyū	Mushi to Medama series	Akira	Mitsuki Mouse	MF Bunko J
2007
01	Holo	Spice and Wolf	Isuna Hasekura	Jū Ayakura	Dengeki Bunko
02	Yuki Nagato	Haruhi Suzumiya	Nagaru Tanigawa	Noizi Ito	Kadokawa Sneaker Bunko
03	Haruhi Suzumiya	Haruhi Suzumiya	Nagaru Tanigawa	Noizi Ito	Kadokawa Sneaker Bunko
04	Tohko Amano	Book Girl	Mizuki Nomura	Miho Takeoka	Famitsu Bunko
05	Kino	Kino's Journey	Keiichi Sigsawa	Kouhaku Kuroboshi	Dengeki Bunko
06	Taiga Aisaka	Toradora!	Yuyuko Takemiya	Yasu	Dengeki Bunko
07	Rika Akiba	Hanbun no Tsuki ga Noboru Sora	Tsumugu Hashimoto	Keiji Yamamoto	Dengeki Bunko
08	Victorique de Blois	Gosick	Kazuki Sakuraba	Hinata Takeda	Kadokawa Beans Bunko
09	Shana	Shakugan no Shana	Yashichiro Takahashi	Noizi Ito	Dengeki Bunko
10	Louise Françoise Le Blanc de La Vallière	The Familiar of Zero	Noboru Yamaguchi	Eiji Usatsuka	MF Bunko J
2008
01	Haruhi Suzumiya	Haruhi Suzumiya	Nagaru Tanigawa	Noizi Ito	Kadokawa Sneaker Bunko
02	Tohko Amano	Book Girl	Mizuki Nomura	Miho Takeoka	Famitsu Bunko
03	Yuki Nagato	Haruhi Suzumiya	Nagaru Tanigawa	Noizi Ito	Kadokawa Sneaker Bunko
04	Holo	Spice and Wolf	Isuna Hasekura	Jū Ayakura	Dengeki Bunko
05	Kaname Chidori	Full Metal Panic!	Shoji Gatoh	Shiki Douji	Fujimi Fantasia Bunko
06	Kino	Kino's Journey	Keiichi Sigsawa	Kouhaku Kuroboshi	Dengeki Bunko
07	Hitagi Senjōgahara	Monogatari series	Nisio Isin	Vofan	Kodansha Box
08	Nanase Kotobuki	Book Girl	Mizuki Nomura	Miho Takeoka	Famitsu Bunko
09	Teletha Testarossa	Full Metal Panic!	Shoji Gatoh	Shiki Douji	Fujimi Fantasia Bunko
10	Taiga Aisaka	Toradora!	Yuyuko Takemiya	Yasu	Dengeki Bunko
2009
01	Tohko Amano	Book Girl	Mizuki Nomura	Miho Takeoka	Famitsu Bunko
02	Holo	Spice and Wolf	Isuna Hasekura	Jū Ayakura	Dengeki Bunko
03	Taiga Aisaka	Toradora!	Yuyuko Takemiya	Yasu	Dengeki Bunko
04	Nanase Kotobuki	Book Girl	Mizuki Nomura	Miho Takeoka	Famitsu Bunko
05	Mikoto Misaka	A Certain Magical Index	Kazuma Kamachi	Kiyotaka Haimura	Dengeki Bunko
06	Kino	Kino's Journey	Keiichi Sigsawa	Kouhaku Kuroboshi	Dengeki Bunko
07	Hitagi Senjōgahara	Monogatari series	Nisio Isin	Vofan	Kodansha Box
08	Kluele Sophi Net	Tasogareiro no Uta Tsukai	Sazane Kei	Miho Takeoka	Fujimi Fantasia Bunko
09	Shana	Shakugan no Shana	Yashichiro Takahashi	Noizi Ito	Dengeki Bunko
10	Hideyoshi Kinoshita	Baka and Test	Kenji Inoue	Yui Haga	Famitsu Bunko

=== 2010–2014 ===
Rank	Character	Title	Author	Artist	Imprint
2010
01	Mikoto Misaka	A Certain Magical Index	Kazuma Kamachi	Kiyotaka Haimura	Dengeki Bunko
02	Tohko Amano	Book Girl series	Mizuki Nomura	Miho Takeoka	Famitsu Bunko
03	Nanase Kotobuki	Book Girl series	Mizuki Nomura	Miho Takeoka	Famitsu Bunko
04	Hitagi Senjōgahara	Monogatari series	Nisio Isin	Vofan	Kodansha Box
05	Taiga Aisaka	Toradora!	Yuyuko Takemiya	Yasu	Dengeki Bunko
06	Karuma Takasaki	Sōkyū no Karuma	Kōshi Tachibana	Haruyuki Morisawa	Fujimi Fantasia Bunko
07	Hideyoshi Kinoshita	Baka to Test to Shōkanjū	Kenji Inoue	Yui Haga	Famitsu Bunko
08	Kino	Kino no Tabi -the Beautiful World-	Keiichi Sigsawa	Kouhaku Kuroboshi	Dengeki Bunko
09	Kluele Sophi Net	Tasogareiro no Uta Tsukai series	Sazane Kei	Miho Takeoka	Fujimi Fantasia Bunko
10	Holo	Spice and Wolf	Isuna Hasekura	Jū Ayakura	Dengeki Bunko
2011
01	Mikoto Misaka	A Certain Magical Index	Kazuma Kamachi	Kiyotaka Haimura	Dengeki Bunko
02	Yūko Shionji / Alice	Kami-sama no Memo-chō	Hikaru Sugii	Mel Kishida	Dengeki Bunko
03	Index Librorum Prohibitorum	A Certain Magical Index	Kazuma Kamachi	Kiyotaka Haimura	Dengeki Bunko
04	Sena Kashiwazaki	Boku wa Tomodachi ga Sukunai	Yomi Hirasaka	Buriki	MF Bunko J
05	Tohko Amano	Book Girl series	Mizuki Nomura	Miho Takeoka	Famitsu Bunko
06	Asuna Yūki / Asuna	Sword Art Online	Reki Kawahara	Abec	Dengeki Bunko
07	Itsuwa	A Certain Magical Index	Kazuma Kamachi	Kiyotaka Haimura	Dengeki Bunko
08	Hitagi Senjōgahara	Monogatari series	Nisio Isin	Vofan	Kodansha Box
09	Erio Tōwa	Denpa Onna to Seishun Otoko	Hitoma Iruma	Buriki	Dengeki Bunko
10	Nanase Kotobuki	Book Girl series	Mizuki Nomura	Miho Takeoka	Famitsu Bunko
2012
01	Mikoto Misaka	A Certain Magical Index	Kazuma Kamachi	Kiyotaka Haimura	Dengeki Bunko
02	Asuna Yūki / Asuna	Sword Art Online	Reki Kawahara	Abec	Dengeki Bunko
03	Sena Kashiwazaki	Boku wa Tomodachi ga Sukunai	Yomi Hirasaka	Buriki	MF Bunko J
04	Ruri Goko / Kuroneko	Ore no Imōto ga Konna ni Kawaii Wake ga Nai	Tsukasa Fushimi	Hiro Kanzaki	Dengeki Bunko
05	Yūko Shionji / Alice	Kami-sama no Memo-chō	Hikaru Sugii	Mel Kishida	Dengeki Bunko
06	Himeko Inaba	Kokoro Connect	Sadanatsu Anda	Shiromizakana	Famitsu Bunko
07	Hitagi Senjōgahara	Monogatari series	Nisio Isin	Vofan	Kodansha Box
07	Kirino Kousaka	Ore no Imōto ga Konna ni Kawaii Wake ga Nai	Tsukasa Fushimi	Hiro Kanzaki	Dengeki Bunko
09	Haruhi Suzumiya	Haruhi Suzumiya series	Nagaru Tanigawa	Noizi Ito	Kadokawa Sneaker Bunko
10	Yozora Mikazuki	Boku wa Tomodachi ga Sukunai	Yomi Hirasaka	Buriki	MF Bunko J
2013
01	Mikoto Misaka	A Certain Magical Index	Kazuma Kamachi	Kiyotaka Haimura	Dengeki Bunko
02	Asuna Yūki / Asuna	Sword Art Online	Reki Kawahara	Abec	Dengeki Bunko
03	Himeko Inaba	Kokoro Connect	Sadanatsu Anda	Shiromizakana	Famitsu Bunko
04	Kuroyukihime	Accel World	Reki Kawahara	HiMA	Dengeki Bunko
05	Sena Kashiwazaki	Boku wa Tomodachi ga Sukunai	Yomi Hirasaka	Buriki	MF Bunko J
06	Ruri Goko / Kuroneko	Ore no Imōto ga Konna ni Kawaii Wake ga Nai	Tsukasa Fushimi	Hiro Kanzaki	Dengeki Bunko
07	Shino Asada / Sinon	Sword Art Online	Reki Kawahara	Abec	Dengeki Bunko
08	Yukino Yukinoshita	My Youth Romantic Comedy Is Wrong, As I Expected	Wataru Watari	Ponkan8	Gagaga Bunko
09	Kirino Kousaka	Ore no Imōto ga Konna ni Kawaii Wake ga Nai	Tsukasa Fushimi	Hiro Kanzaki	Dengeki Bunko
10	Yozora Mikazuki	Boku wa Tomodachi ga Sukunai	Yomi Hirasaka	Buriki	MF Bunko J
2014
01	Mikoto Misaka	A Certain Magical Index	Kazuma Kamachi	Kiyotaka Haimura	Dengeki Bunko
02	Yukino Yukinoshita	My Youth Romantic Comedy Is Wrong, As I Expected	Wataru Watari	Ponkan8	Gagaga Bunko
03	Asuna Yūki / Asuna	Sword Art Online	Reki Kawahara	Abec	Dengeki Bunko
04	Yui Yuigahama	My Youth Romantic Comedy Is Wrong, As I Expected	Wataru Watari	Ponkan8	Gagaga Bunko
05	Index Librorum Prohibitorum	A Certain Magical Index	Kazuma Kamachi	Kiyotaka Haimura	Dengeki Bunko
06	Kirino Kousaka	Ore no Imōto ga Konna ni Kawaii Wake ga Nai	Tsukasa Fushimi	Hiro Kanzaki	Dengeki Bunko
07	Ayase Aragaki	Ore no Imōto ga Konna ni Kawaii Wake ga Nai	Tsukasa Fushimi	Hiro Kanzaki	Dengeki Bunko
08	Shino Asada / Sinon	Sword Art Online	Reki Kawahara	Abec	Dengeki Bunko
09	Miyuki Shiba	The Irregular at Magic High School	Tsutomu Satō	Kana Ishida	Dengeki Bunko
10	Yozora Mikazuki	Boku wa Tomodachi ga Sukunai	Yomi Hirasaka	Buriki	MF Bunko J

=== 2015–2019 ===
Rank	Character	Title	Author	Artist	Imprint
2015
01	Yukino Yukinoshita	My Youth Romantic Comedy Is Wrong, As I Expected	Wataru Watari	Ponkan8	Gagaga Bunko
02	Mikoto Misaka	A Certain Magical Index	Kazuma Kamachi	Kiyotaka Haimura	Dengeki Bunko
03	Yui Yuigahama	My Youth Romantic Comedy Is Wrong, As I Expected	Wataru Watari	Ponkan8	Gagaga Bunko
04	Asuna Yūki / Asuna	Sword Art Online	Reki Kawahara	Abec	Dengeki Bunko
05	Othinus	A Certain Magical Index	Kazuma Kamachi	Kiyotaka Haimura	Dengeki Bunko
06	Index Librorum Prohibitorum	A Certain Magical Index	Kazuma Kamachi	Kiyotaka Haimura	Dengeki Bunko
07	Shino Asada / Sinon	Sword Art Online	Reki Kawahara	Abec	Dengeki Bunko
08	Komachi Hikigaya	My Youth Romantic Comedy Is Wrong, As I Expected	Wataru Watari	Ponkan8	Gagaga Bunko
09	Misaki Shokuhō	A Certain Magical Index	Kazuma Kamachi	Kiyotaka Haimura	Dengeki Bunko
10	Shiro	No Game No Life	Yū Kamiya		MF Bunko J
2016
01	Mikoto Misaka	A Certain Magical Index	Kazuma Kamachi	Kiyotaka Haimura	Dengeki Bunko
02	Yukino Yukinoshita	My Youth Romantic Comedy Is Wrong, As I Expected	Wataru Watari	Ponkan8	Gagaga Bunko
03	Iroha Ishhiki	My Youth Romantic Comedy Is Wrong, As I Expected	Wataru Watari	Ponkan8	Gagaga Bunko
04	Yui Yuigahama	My Youth Romantic Comedy Is Wrong, As I Expected	Wataru Watari	Ponkan8	Gagaga Bunko
05	Asuna Yūki / Asuna	Sword Art Online	Reki Kawahara	Abec	Dengeki Bunko
06	Megumi Katou	Saekano: How to Raise a Boring Girlfriend	Fumiaki Maruto	Kurehito Misaki	Fujimi Fantasia Bunko
07	Shiro	No Game No Life	Yū Kamiya		MF Bunko J
08	Miyuki Shiba	The Irregular at Magic High School	Tsutomu Satō	Kana Ishida	Dengeki Bunko
09	Othinus	A Certain Magical Index	Kazuma Kamachi	Kiyotaka Haimura	Dengeki Bunko
10	Index Librorum Prohibitorum	A Certain Magical Index	Kazuma Kamachi	Kiyotaka Haimura	Dengeki Bunko
2017
01	Mikoto Misaka	A Certain Magical Index	Kazuma Kamachi	Kiyotaka Haimura	Dengeki Bunko
02	Rem	Re:Zero -Starting Life in Another World-	Tappei Nagatsuki	Shinichirou Ootsuka	MF Bunko J
03	Megumin	KonoSuba	Natsume Akatsuki	Kurone Mishima	Kadokawa Sneaker Bunko
04	Asuna Yūki / Asuna	Sword Art Online	Reki Kawahara	Abec	Dengeki Bunko
05	Yukino Yukinoshita	My Youth Romantic Comedy Is Wrong, As I Expected	Wataru Watari	Ponkan8	Gagaga Bunko
06	Megumi Katou	Saekano: How to Raise a Boring Girlfriend	Fumiaki Maruto	Kurehito Misaki	Fujimi Fantasia Bunko
07	White Queen	Mitou Shoukan:// Blood-Sign	Kazuma Kamachi	Waki Ikawa	Dengeki Bunko
08	Emilia	Re:Zero -Starting Life in Another World-	Tappei Nagatsuki	Shinichirou Ootsuka	MF Bunko J
09	Index Librorum Prohibitorum	A Certain Magical Index	Kazuma Kamachi	Kiyotaka Haimura	Dengeki Bunko
10	Othinus	A Certain Magical Index	Kazuma Kamachi	Kiyotaka Haimura	Dengeki Bunko
2018
01	Mikoto Misaka	A Certain Magical Index	Kazuma Kamachi	Kiyotaka Haimura	Dengeki Bunko
02	Myne	Ascendance of a Bookworm	Miya Kazuki	You Shiina	Nico Nico Seiga
03	Asuna Yūki / Asuna	Sword Art Online	Reki Kawahara	Abec	Dengeki Bunko
04	Mai Sakurajima	Rascal Does Not Dream of Bunny Girl Senpai	Hajime Kamoshida	Keeji Mizoguchi	Dengeki Bunko
05	Megumi Katou	Saekano: How to Raise a Boring Girlfriend	Fumiaki Maruto	Kurehito Misaki	Fujimi Fantasia Bunko
06	Yukino Yukinoshita	My Youth Romantic Comedy Is Wrong, As I Expected	Wataru Watari	Ponkan8	Gagaga Bunko
07	Yui Yuigahama	My Youth Romantic Comedy Is Wrong, As I Expected	Wataru Watari	Ponkan8	Gagaga Bunko
08	Rem	Re:Zero -Starting Life in Another World-	Tappei Nagatsuki	Shinichirou Ootsuka	MF Bunko J
09	Iroha Isshiki	My Youth Romantic Comedy Is Wrong, As I Expected	Wataru Watari	Ponkan8	Gagaga Bunko
10	Othinus	A Certain Magical Index	Kazuma Kamachi	Kiyotaka Haimura	Dengeki Bunko
2019
01	Mikoto Misaka	A Certain Magical Index	Kazuma Kamachi	Kiyotaka Haimura	Dengeki Bunko
02	Vladilena Mirizé	86	Asato Asato	Shirabi	Dengeki Bunko
03	Asuna Yūki / Asuna	Sword Art Online	Reki Kawahara	Abec	Dengeki Bunko
04	Ginko Sora	The Ryuo's Work Is Never Done!	Shirou Shiratori	Shirabi	GA Bunko
05	Myne	Ascendance of a Bookworm	Miya Kazuki	You Shiina	Nico Nico Seiga
06	Minami Nanami	Bottom-tier Character Tomozaki	Yaku Yuuki	Fly	Gagaga Bunko
07	Mai Sakurajima	Rascal Does Not Dream of Bunny Girl Senpai	Hajime Kamoshida	Keeji Mizoguchi	Dengeki Bunko
08	Kei Karuizawa	Classroom of the Elite	Shōgo Kinugasa	Shunsaku Tomose	MF Bunko J
09	Ai Yashajin	The Ryuo's Work Is Never Done!	Shirou Shiratori	Shirabi	GA Bunko
10	Elaina	Wandering Witch: The Journey of Elaina	Shiraishi Jougi	Azul	GA Novel

=== 2020–2024 ===
Rank	Character	Title	Author	Artist	Imprint
2020
01	Kei Karuizawa	Classroom of the Elite	Shōgo Kinugasa	Shunsaku Tomose	MF Bunko J
02	Ginko Sora	The Ryuo's Work Is Never Done!	Shirou Shiratori	Shirabi	GA Bunko
03	Mikoto Misaka	A Certain Magical Index	Kazuma Kamachi	Kiyotaka Haimura	Dengeki Bunko
04	Mai Sakurajima	Rascal Does Not Dream of Bunny Girl Senpai	Hajime Kamoshida	Keeji Mizoguchi	Dengeki Bunko
05	Minami Nanami	Bottom-tier Character Tomozaki	Yaku Yuuki	Fly	Gagaga Bunko
06	Elaina	Wandering Witch: The Journey of Elaina	Shiraishi Jougi	Azul	GA Novel
07	Honami Ichinose	Classroom of the Elite	Shōgo Kinugasa	Shunsaku Tomose	MF Bunko J
08	Mahiru Shiina	The Angel Next Door Spoils Me Rotten	Saekisan	Hazano Kazutake	GA Bunko
09	Shouko Makinohara	Rascal Does Not Dream of Bunny Girl Senpai	Hajime Kamoshida	Keeji Mizoguchi	Dengeki Bunko
10	Vladilena Mirizé	86	Asato Asato	Shirabi	Dengeki Bunko
2021
01	Kei Karuizawa	Classroom of the Elite	Shōgo Kinugasa	Shunsaku Tomose	MF Bunko J
02	Mahiru Shiina	The Angel Next Door Spoils Me Rotten	Saekisan	Hazano Kazutake	GA Bunko
03	Myne	Ascendance of a Bookworm	Miya Kazuki	You Shiina	TO BOOKS
04	Siesta	The Detective Is Already Dead	Nigojuu	Umibouzu	MF Bunko J
05	Mai Sakurajima	Rascal Does Not Dream of Bunny Girl Senpai	Hajime Kamoshida	Keeji Mizoguchi	Dengeki Bunko
06	Honami Ichinose	Classroom of the Elite	Shōgo Kinugasa	Shunsaku Tomose	MF Bunko J
07	Mikoto Misaka	A Certain Magical Index	Kazuma Kamachi	Kiyotaka Haimura	Dengeki Bunko
08	Kuroha Shida	Osamake: Romcom Where The Childhood Friend Won't Lose	Shūichi Nimaru	Shigure Ui	Dengeki Bunko
09	Yume Irido	My Stepmom's Daughter Is My Ex	Kamishiro Kyousuke	Takayaki	Kadokawa Sneaker Bunko
10	Minami Nanami	Bottom-tier Character Tomozaki	Yaku Yuuki	Fly	Gagaga Bunko
2022
01	Mahiru Shiina	The Angel Next Door Spoils Me Rotten	Saekisan	Hazano Kazutake	GA Bunko
02	Siesta	The Detective Is Already Dead	Nigojuu	Umibouzu	MF Bunko J
03	Yukino Yukinoshita	My Youth Romantic Comedy Is Wrong, As I Expected	Wataru Watari	Ponkan8	Gagaga Bunko
04	Kei Karuizawa	Classroom of the Elite	Shōgo Kinugasa	Shunsaku Tomose	MF Bunko J
05	Myne	Ascendance of a Bookworm	Miya Kazuki	You Shiina	TO BOOKS
06	Alisa Mikhailovna Kujou	Alya Sometimes Hides Her Feelings in Russian	Sunsunsun	Momoco	Kadokawa Sneaker Bunko
07	Saki Ayase	Days with My Stepsister	Ghost Mikawa	Hiten	MF Bunko J
08	Haru Aomi	Chitose is in the Ramune Bottle	Hiromu	raemz	Gagaga Bunko
09	Yuzuki Nanase	Chitose is in the Ramune Bottle	Hiromu	raemz	Gagaga Bunko
10	Honami Ichinose	Classroom of the Elite	Shōgo Kinugasa	Shunsaku Tomose	MF Bunko J
2023
01	Mahiru Shiina	The Angel Next Door Spoils Me Rotten	Saekisan	Hazano Kazutake	GA Bunko
02	Kei Karuizawa	Classroom of the Elite	Shōgo Kinugasa	Shunsaku Tomose	MF Bunko J
03	Yukino Yukinoshita	My Youth Romantic Comedy Is Wrong, As I Expected	Wataru Watari	Ponkan8	Gagaga Bunko
04	Myne	Ascendance of a Bookworm	Miya Kazuki	You Shiina	TO BOOKS
05	Dahlia Rossetti	Dahlia in Bloom: Crafting a Fresh Start with Magical Tools	Hisaya Amagishi	Kei	MF Books
06	Siesta	The Detective Is Already Dead	Nigojuu	Umibouzu	MF Bunko J
07	Yuzuki Nanase	Chitose is in the Ramune Bottle	Hiromu	raemz	Gagaga Bunko
08	Alisa Mikhailovna Kujou	Alya Sometimes Hides Her Feelings in Russian	Sunsunsun	Momoco	Kadokawa Sneaker Bunko
09	Saki Ayase	Days with My Stepsister	Ghost Mikawa	Hiten	MF Bunko J
10	Vladilena Milizé	86	Asato Asato	Shirabi	Dengeki Bunko
2024
01	Mahiru Shiina	The Angel Next Door Spoils Me Rotten	Saekisan	Hazano Kazutake	GA Bunko
02	Alisa Mikhailovna Kujou	Alya Sometimes Hides Her Feelings in Russian	Sunsunsun	Momoco	Kadokawa Sneaker Bunko
03	Wisteria Irene	The Person I Loved Asked Me to Die in My Sister's Stead	Nagano Mizuki	Toyota Saori	TO BOOKS
04	Siesta	The Detective Is Already Dead	Nigojuu	Umibouzu	MF Bunko J
05	Luciana Dianthus	The Villainess’s Guide to (Not) Falling in Love	Touya	Yoimachi	SQEX Novel
06	Fia Ruud	A Tale of the Secret Saint	Touya	chibi	Earth Star Novel
07	Rishe Irmgard Weitzner	7th Time Loop	Touko Amekawa	Wan Hachipisu	Overlap Novels f
08	Umi Asanagi	I Made Friends with the Second Prettiest Girl in My Class	Takata	Tom Osabe	Kadokawa Sneaker Bunko
09	Maomao	The Apothecary Diaries	Hyūganatsu	Touko Shino	Hero Bunko
10	Yuki Suou	Alya Sometimes Hides Her Feelings in Russian	Sunsunsun	Momoco	Kadokawa Sneaker Bunko

=== 2025 ===
Rank	Character	Title	Author	Artist	Imprint
2025
01	Mahiru Shiina	The Angel Next Door Spoils Me Rotten	Saekisan	Hazano Kazutake	GA Bunko
02	Anna Yanami	Too Many Losing Heroines!	Takibi Amamori	Imigimuru	Gagaga Bunko
03	Alisa Mikhailovna Kujou	Alya Sometimes Hides Her Feelings in Russian	Sunsunsun	Momoco	Kadokawa Sneaker Bunko
04	Dahlia Rossetti	Dahlia in Bloom: Crafting a Fresh Start with Magical Tools	Hisaya Amagishi	Kei	MF Books
05	Yuki Suou	Alya Sometimes Hides Her Feelings in Russian	Sunsunsun	Momoco	Kadokawa Sneaker Bunko
06	Fia Ruud	A Tale of the Secret Saint	Touya	chibi	Earth Star Novel
07	Luciana Dianthus	The Villainess’s Guide to (Not) Falling in Love	Touya	Yoimachi	SQEX Novel
08	Wisteria Irene	The Person I Loved Asked Me to Die in My Sister's Stead	Mizuki Nagano	Saori Toyota	TO Bunko
09	Rishe Irmgard Weitzner	7th Time Loop: The Villainess Enjoys a Carefree Life Married to Her Worst Enemy!	Touko Amekawa	Wan Hachipisu	Ovelap Novels f
10	Saki Ayase	Days with My Stepsister	Ghost Mikawa	Hiten	MF Bunko J

== Top 10 male characters rankings (until 2025) ==
Year	Character	Title	Author	Artist	Imprint
2005	I (Boku)	Zaregoto series	Nisio Isin	Take	Kodansha Novels
2006	I (Boku)	Zaregoto series	Nisio Isin	Take	Kodansha Novels
2007	Mikoto Sayama	Owari no Chronicle (Ahead series)	Minoru Kawakami	Satoyasu	Dengeki Bunko
2008	Sousuke Sagara	Full Metal Panic!	Shoji Gatoh	Shikidouji	Fujimi Fantasia Bunko
2009	Hideyoshi Kinoshita	Baka to Test to Shōkanjū	Kenji Inoue	Yui Haga	Famitsu Bunko
2010	Hideyoshi Kinoshita	Baka to Test to Shōkanjū	Kenji Inoue	Yui Haga	Famitsu Bunko
2011	Toma Kamijo	A Certain Magical Index	Kazuma Kamachi	Kiyotaka Haimura	Dengeki Bunko
2012	Kazuto Kirigaya / Kirito	Sword Art Online	Reki Kawahara	Abec	Dengeki Bunko
2013	Kazuto Kirigaya / Kirito	Sword Art Online	Reki Kawahara	Abec	Dengeki Bunko
2014	Hachiman Hikigaya	My Youth Romantic Comedy Is Wrong, As I Expected	Wataru Watari	Ponkan8	Gagaga Bunko
2015	Hachiman Hikigaya	My Youth Romantic Comedy Is Wrong, As I Expected	Wataru Watari	Ponkan8	Gagaga Bunko
2016	Hachiman Hikigaya	My Youth Romantic Comedy Is Wrong, As I Expected	Wataru Watari	Ponkan8	Gagaga Bunko
2017	Tōma Kamijō	A Certain Magical Index	Kazuma Kamachi	Kiyotaka Haimura	Dengeki Bunko
2018	Kazuto Kirigaya / Kirito	Sword Art Online	Reki Kawahara	Abec	Dengeki Bunko
2019	Tōma Kamijō	A Certain Magical Index	Kazuma Kamachi	Kiyotaka Haimura	Dengeki Bunko
2020	Kiyotaka Ayanokouji	Classroom of the Elite	Shōgo Kinugasa	Shunsaku Tomose	MF Bunko J
2021	Kiyotaka Ayanokouji	Classroom of the Elite	Shōgo Kinugasa	Shunsaku Tomose	MF Bunko J
2022	Kiyotaka Ayanokouji	Classroom of the Elite	Shōgo Kinugasa	Shunsaku Tomose	MF Bunko J
2023	Kiyotaka Ayanokouji	Classroom of the Elite	Shōgo Kinugasa	Shunsaku Tomose	MF Bunko J
2024	Amane Fujimiya	The Angel Next Door Spoils Me Rotten	Saekisan	Hazano Kazutake	GA Bunko
2025	Kazuhiko Nukumizu	Too Many Losing Heroines!	Takibi Amamori	Imigimuru	Gagaga Bunko

=== 2005–2009 ===
Rank	Character	Title	Author	Artist	Imprint
2005
01	I	Zaregoto series	Nisio Isin	Take	Kodansha Novels
02	Sousuke Sagara	Full Metal Panic!	Shoji Gatoh	Shikidouji	Fujimi Fantasia Bunko
03	Mikoto Sayama	Owari no Chronicle (Ahead series)	Minoru Kawakami	Satoyasu	Dengeki Bunko
04	Orphen	Majutsushi Orphen	Yoshinobu Akita	Yuuya Kusaka	Fujimi Fantasia Bunko
05	Maisaka Ryi	Beat no Discipline	Kouhei Kadono	Kouji Ogata	Dengeki Bunko
06	Kei Monobe	D Crackers	Kōhei Azano	Hisato Murasaki	Fujimi Fantasia Bunko
07	Elion	Harmonizer-Elion	Yoru Yoshimura	Tsukasa Kotobuki	Fujimi Fantasia Bunko
08	Maido B. Garnash	Detamaka	Kazuyuki Takami	Chiyoko	Kadokawa Sneaker Bunko
09	Ferio Aruseifu	Soranokane no Hibiku Wakusei de	Soichiro Watase	Minako Iwasaki	Dengeki Bunko
10	Dr. Kishida	Ariel	Yūichi Sasamoto	Masahisa Suzuki	Sonorama Bunko
2006
01	I	Zaregoto series	Nisio Isin	Take	Kodansha Novels
02	Mikoto Sayama	Owari no Chronicle (Ahead series)	Minoru Kawakami	Satoyasu	Dengeki Bunko
03	Gaius Levina Sorel	Saredo Tsumibito wa Ryū to Odoru	Asai Labo	Miyagi	Gagaga Bunko
04	Sousuke Sagara	Full Metal Panic!	Shoji Gatoh	Shikidouji	Fujimi Fantasia Bunko
05	Shizuo Heiwajima	Durarara!!	Ryohgo Narita	Suzuhito Yasuda	Dengeki Bunko
06	Hitoshiki Zerozaki	Zaregoto series	Nisio Isin	Take	Kodansha Novels
07	Yuri Shibuya	Kyo Kara Maoh!	Tomo Takabayashi	Temari Matsumoto	Kadokawa Sneaker Bunko
08	Abel Nightroad	Trinity Blood	Sunao Yoshida	Thores Shibamoto	Kadokawa Sneaker Bunko
09	Conrad / Conrart Weller	Kyo Kara Maoh!	Tomo Takabayashi	Temari Matsumoto	Kadokawa Sneaker Bunko
10	Daisuke Kusuriya	Mushi-Uta	Kyouhei Iwai	Ruroo	Kadokawa Sneaker Bunko
2007
01	Mikoto Sayama	Owari no Chronicle (Ahead series)	Minoru Kawakami	Satoyasu	Dengeki Bunko
02	I	Zaregoto series	Nisio Isin	Take	Kodansha Novels
03	Hitoshiki Zerozaki	Zaregoto series	Nisio Isin	Take	Kodansha Novels
04	Shizuo Heiwajima	Durarara!!	Ryohgo Narita	Suzuhito Yasuda	Dengeki Bunko
05	Sousuke Sagara	Full Metal Panic!	Shoji Gatoh	Shikidouji	Fujimi Fantasia Bunko
06	Kyon	Haruhi Suzumiya series	Nagaru Tanigawa	Noizi Ito	Kadokawa Sneaker Bunko
07	Gaius Levina Sorel	Saredo Tsumibito wa Ryū to Odoru	Asai Labo	Miyagi	Gagaga Bunko
08	Izaya Orihara	Durarara!!	Ryohgo Narita	Suzuhito Yasuda	Dengeki Bunko
09	Toma Kamijo	A Certain Magical Index	Kazuma Kamachi	Kiyotaka Haimura	Dengeki Bunko
10	Daisuke Kusuriya	Mushi-Uta	Kyouhei Iwai	Ruroo	Kadokawa Sneaker Bunko
2008
01	Sousuke Sagara	Full Metal Panic!	Shoji Gatoh	Shikidouji	Fujimi Fantasia Bunko
02	Kyon	Haruhi Suzumiya series	Nagaru Tanigawa	Noizi Ito	Kadokawa Sneaker Bunko
03	Tōma Kamijō	A Certain Magical Index	Kazuma Kamachi	Kiyotaka Haimura	Dengeki Bunko
04	Hideyoshi Kinoshita	Baka to Test to Shōkanjū	Kenji Inoue	Yui Haga	Famitsu Bunko
05	Ryūji Takasu	Toradora!	Yuyuko Takemiya	Yasu	Dengeki Bunko
06	Daisuke Kusuriya	Mushi-Uta	Kyouhei Iwai	Ruroo	Kadokawa Sneaker Bunko
07	Konoha Inoue	Book Girl series	Mizuki Nomura	Miho Takeoka	Famitsu Bunko
08	Saito Hiraga	Zero no Tsukaima	Noboru Yamaguchi	Eiji Usatsuka	MF Bunko J
09	Kraft Lawrence	Spice and Wolf	Isuna Hasekura	Jū Ayakura	Dengeki Bunko
10	Kurz Weber	Full Metal Panic!	Shoji Gatoh	Shikidouji	Fujimi Fantasia Bunko
2009
01	Hideyoshi Kinoshita	Baka to Test to Shōkanjū	Kenji Inoue	Yui Haga	Famitsu Bunko
02	Ryūji Takasu	Toradora!	Yuyuko Takemiya	Yasu	Dengeki Bunko
03	Tōma Kamijō	A Certain Magical Index	Kazuma Kamachi	Kiyotaka Haimura	Dengeki Bunko
04	Sousuke Sagara	Full Metal Panic!	Shoji Gatoh	Shikidouji	Fujimi Fantasia Bunko
05	Konoha Inoue	Book Girl series	Mizuki Nomura	Miho Takeoka	Famitsu Bunko
06	Koyomi Araragi	Monogatari series	Nisio Isin	Vofan	Kodansha Box
07	Mii-kun	Usotsuki Mii-kun to Kowareta Maa-chan	Hitoma Iruma	Hidari	Dengeki Bunko
08	Akihisa Yoshii	Baka to Test to Shōkanjū	Kenji Inoue	Yui Haga	Famitsu Bunko
09	Kraft Lawrence	Spice and Wolf	Isuna Hasekura	Jū Ayakura	Dengeki Bunko
10	Ken Sugisaki	Seitokai no Ichizon series	Sekina Aoi	Kira Inugami	Fujimi Fantasia Bunko

=== 2010–2014 ===
Rank	Character	Title	Author	Artist	Imprint
2010
01	Hideyoshi Kinoshita	Baka to Test to Shōkanjū	Kenji Inoue	Yui Haga	Famitsu Bunko
02	Koyomi Araragi	Monogatari series	Nisio Isin	Vofan	Kodansha Box
03	Tōma Kamijō	A Certain Magical Index	Kazuma Kamachi	Kiyotaka Haimura	Dengeki Bunko
04	Mii-kun	Usotsuki Mii-kun to Kowareta Maa-chan	Hitoma Iruma	Hidari	Dengeki Bunko
05	Ken Sugisaki	Seitokai no Ichizon series	Sekina Aoi	Kira Inugami	Fujimi Fantasia Bunko
06	Ryūji Takasu	Toradora!	Yuyuko Takemiya	Yasu	Dengeki Bunko
07	Konoha Inoue	Book Girl series	Mizuki Nomura	Miho Takeoka	Famitsu Bunko
08	Neight Yehlemihas	Tasogareiro no Uta Tsukai series	Kei Sazane	Miho Takeoka	Fujimi Fantasia Bunko
09	Hideo Kawamura	Sentō Jōsai Masurawo	Tomoaki Hayashi	Yumehito Ueda	Kadokawa Sneaker Bunko
10	Akihisa Yoshii	Baka to Test to Shōkanjū	Kenji Inoue	Yui Haga	Famitsu Bunko
2011
01	Tōma Kamijō	A Certain Magical Index	Kazuma Kamachi	Kiyotaka Haimura	Dengeki Bunko
02	Accelerator	A Certain Magical Index	Kazuma Kamachi	Kiyotaka Haimura	Dengeki Bunko
03	Kazuto Kirigaya / Kirito	Sword Art Online	Reki Kawahara	Abec	Dengeki Bunko
04	Hideyoshi Kinoshita	Baka to Test to Shōkanjū	Kenji Inoue	Yui Haga	Famitsu Bunko
05	You Satou	Ben-To	Asaura	Kaito Shibano	Super Dash Bunko
06	Sousuke Sagara	Full Metal Panic!	Shoji Gatoh	Shikidouji	Fujimi Fantasia Bunko
07	Koyomi Araragi	Monogatari series	Nisio Isin	Vofan	Kodansha Box
08	Ken Sugisaki	Seitokai no Ichizon series	Sekina Aoi	Kira Inugami	Fujimi Fantasia Bunko
09	Mii-kun	Usotsuki Mii-kun to Kowareta Maa-chan	Hitoma Iruma	Hidari	Dengeki Bunko
10	Shizuo Heiwajima	Durarara!!	Ryohgo Narita	Suzuhito Yasuda	Dengeki Bunko
2012
01	Kazuto Kirigaya / Kirito	Sword Art Online	Reki Kawahara	Abec	Dengeki Bunko
02	Tōma Kamijō	A Certain Magical Index	Kazuma Kamachi	Kiyotaka Haimura	Dengeki Bunko
03	Koyomi Araragi	Monogatari series	Nisio Isin	Vofan	Kodansha Box
04	Accelerator	A Certain Magical Index	Kazuma Kamachi	Kiyotaka Haimura	Dengeki Bunko
05	You Satou	Ben-To	Asaura	Kaito Shibano	Super Dash Bunko
06	Hideyoshi Kinoshita	Baka to Test to Shōkanjū	Kenji Inoue	Yui Haga	Famitsu Bunko
07	Kyousuke Kousaka	Ore no Imōto ga Konna ni Kawaii Wake ga Nai	Tsukasa Fushimi	Hiro Kanzaki	Dengeki Bunko
08	Kyon	Haruhi Suzumiya series	Nagaru Tanigawa	Noizi Ito	Kadokawa Sneaker Bunko
09	Akihisa Yoshii	Baka to Test to Shōkanjū	Kenji Inoue	Yui Haga	Famitsu Bunko
10	Ken Sugisaki	Seitokai no Ichizon series	Sekina Aoi	Kira Inugami	Fujimi Fantasia Bunko
2013
01	Kazuto Kirigaya / Kirito	Sword Art Online	Reki Kawahara	Abec	Dengeki Bunko
02	Tōma Kamijō	A Certain Magical Index	Kazuma Kamachi	Kiyotaka Haimura	Dengeki Bunko
03	Accelerator	A Certain Magical Index	Kazuma Kamachi	Kiyotaka Haimura	Dengeki Bunko
04	Hachiman Hikigaya	My Youth Romantic Comedy Is Wrong, As I Expected	Wataru Watari	Ponkan8	Gagaga Bunko
05	Kyousuke Kousaka	Ore no Imōto ga Konna ni Kawaii Wake ga Nai	Tsukasa Fushimi	Hiro Kanzaki	Dengeki Bunko
06	Koyomi Araragi	Monogatari series	Nisio Isin	Vofan	Kodansha Box
07	Tatsuya Shiba	The Irregular at Magic High School	Tsutomu Satou	Kana Ishida	Dengeki Bunko
08	You Satou	Ben-To	Asaura	Kaito Shibano	Super Dash Bunko
09	Ken Sugisaki	Seitokai no Ichizon series	Sekina Aoi	Kira Inugami	Fujimi Fantasia Bunko
10	Toori Aoi	Horizon in the Middle of Nowhere	Minoru Kawakami	Satoyasu	Dengeki Bunko
2014
01	Hachiman Hikigaya	My Youth Romantic Comedy Is Wrong, As I Expected	Wataru Watari	Ponkan8	Gagaga Bunko
02	Tōma Kamijō	A Certain Magical Index	Kazuma Kamachi	Kiyotaka Haimura	Dengeki Bunko
03	Kazuto Kirigaya / Kirito	Sword Art Online	Reki Kawahara	Abec	Dengeki Bunko
04	Accelerator	A Certain Magical Index	Kazuma Kamachi	Kiyotaka Haimura	Dengeki Bunko
05	Sadao Maō	The Devil Is a Part-Timer!	Satoshi Wagahara	Oniku	Dengeki Bunko
06	Kyousuke Kousaka	Ore no Imōto ga Konna ni Kawaii Wake ga Nai	Tsukasa Fushimi	Hiro Kanzaki	Dengeki Bunko
07	Izayoi Sakamaki	Mondaiji-tachi ga Isekai Kara Kuru Sō Desu yo?	Tarō Tatsunoko	Yū Amano	Kadokawa Sneaker Bunko
08	Tatsuya Shiba	The Irregular at Magic High School	Tsutomu Satou	Kana Ishida	Dengeki Bunko
09	Ken Sugisaki	Seitokai no Ichizon series	Sekina Aoi	Kira Inugami	Fujimi Fantasia Bunko
10	Koremitsu Akagi	Hikaru ga Chikyū ni Itakoro	Mizuki Nomura	Miho Takeoka	Famitsu Bunko

=== 2015–2019 ===
Rank	Character	Title	Author	Artist	Imprint
2015
01	Hachiman Hikigaya	My Youth Romantic Comedy Is Wrong, As I Expected	Wataru Watari	Ponkan8	Gagaga Bunko
02	Tōma Kamijō	A Certain Magical Index	Kazuma Kamachi	Kiyotaka Haimura	Dengeki Bunko
03	Kazuto Kirigaya / Kirito	Sword Art Online	Reki Kawahara	Abec	Dengeki Bunko
04	Accelerator	A Certain Magical Index	Kazuma Kamachi	Kiyotaka Haimura	Dengeki Bunko
05	Tatsuya Shiba	The Irregular at Magic High School	Tsutomu Satou	Kana Ishida	Dengeki Bunko
06	Sora	No Game No Life	Yū Kamiya		MF Bunko J
07	Rentarō Satomi	Black Bullet	Shiden Kanzaki	Saki Ukai	Dengeki Bunko
08	Bell Cranel	Is It Wrong to Try to Pick Up Girls in a Dungeon?	Fujino Ōmori	Suzuhito Yasuda	GA Bunko
09	Saika Totsuka	My Youth Romantic Comedy Is Wrong, As I Expected	Wataru Watari	Ponkan8	Gagaga Bunko
10	Ikuta Soroku	Alderamin on the Sky	Bokuto Uno	Sanbasō	Dengeki Bunko
2016
01	Hachiman Hikigaya	My Youth Romantic Comedy Is Wrong, As I Expected	Wataru Watari	Ponkan8	Gagaga Bunko
02	Kazuto Kirigaya / Kirito	Sword Art Online	Reki Kawahara	Abec	Dengeki Bunko
03	Tōma Kamijō	A Certain Magical Index	Kazuma Kamachi	Kiyotaka Haimura	Dengeki Bunko
04	Accelerator	A Certain Magical Index	Kazuma Kamachi	Kiyotaka Haimura	Dengeki Bunko
05	Tatsuya Shiba	The Irregular at Magic High School	Tsutomu Satou	Kana Ishida	Dengeki Bunko
06	Sora	No Game No Life	Yū Kamiya		MF Bunko J
07	Bell Cranel	Is It Wrong to Try to Pick Up Girls in a Dungeon?	Fujino Ōmori	Suzuhito Yasuda	GA Bunko
08	Saika Totsuka	My Youth Romantic Comedy Is Wrong, As I Expected	Wataru Watari	Ponkan8	Gagaga Bunko
09	Sakuta Azusagawa	Rascal Does Not Dream of Bunny Girl Senpai	Hajime Kamoshida	Keiji Mizoguchi	Dengeki Bunko
10	Sadao Maō	The Devil Is a Part-Timer!	Satoshi Wagahara	Oniku	Dengeki Bunko
2017
01	Tōma Kamijō	A Certain Magical Index	Kazuma Kamachi	Kiyotaka Haimura	Dengeki Bunko
02	Kazuto Kirigaya / Kirito	Sword Art Online	Reki Kawahara	Abec	Dengeki Bunko
03	Accelerator	A Certain Magical Index	Kazuma Kamachi	Kiyotaka Haimura	Dengeki Bunko
04	Subaru Natsuki	Re:Zero -Starting Life in Another World-	Tappei Nagatsuki	Shinichirou Ootsuka	MF Bunko J
05	Hachiman Hikigaya	My Youth Romantic Comedy Is Wrong, As I Expected	Wataru Watari	Ponkan8	Gagaga Bunko
06	Ninja Slayer / Kenji Fujikido	Ninja Slayer series	Bradley Bond; Philip Ninj@ Morzez	Warainaku	Enterbrain
07	Tatsuya Shiba	The Irregular at Magic High School	Tsutomu Satou	Kana Ishida	Dengeki Bunko
08	Kazuma Sato	KonoSuba	Natsume Akatsuki	Kurone Mishima	Kadokawa Sneaker Bunko
09	Sora	No Game No Life	Yū Kamiya		MF Bunko J
10	Kyousuke Shiroyama	Mitou Shoukan:// Blood-Sign	Kazuma Kamachi	Waki Ikawa	Dengeki Bunko
2018
01	Kazuto Kirigaya / Kirito	Sword Art Online	Reki Kawahara	Abec	Dengeki Bunko
02	Hachiman Hikigaya	My Youth Romantic Comedy Is Wrong, As I Expected	Wataru Watari	Ponkan8	Gagaga Bunko
03	Tōma Kamijō	A Certain Magical Index	Kazuma Kamachi	Kiyotaka Haimura	Dengeki Bunko
04	Tatsuya Shiba	The Irregular at Magic High School	Tsutomu Satou	Kana Ishida	Dengeki Bunko
05	Accelerator	A Certain Magical Index	Kazuma Kamachi	Kiyotaka Haimura	Dengeki Bunko
06	Sora	No Game No Life	Yū Kamiya		MF Bunko J
07	Subaru Natsuki	Re:Zero -Starting Life in Another World-	Tappei Nagatsuki	Shinichirou Ootsuka	MF Bunko J
08	Ferdinand	Ascendance of a Bookworm	Miya Kazuki	You Shiina	Nico Nico Seiga
09	Kazuma Sato	KonoSuba	Natsume Akatsuki	Kurone Mishima	Kadokawa Sneaker Bunko
10	Kiyotaka Ayanokouji	Classroom of the Elite	Shōgo Kinugasa	Shunsaku Tomose	MF Bunko J
2019
01	Tōma Kamijō	A Certain Magical Index	Kazuma Kamachi	Kiyotaka Haimura	Dengeki Bunko
02	Hachiman Hikigaya	My Youth Romantic Comedy Is Wrong, As I Expected	Wataru Watari	Ponkan8	Gagaga Bunko
03	Kazuto Kirigaya / Kirito	Sword Art Online	Reki Kawahara	Abec	Dengeki Bunko
04	Kiyotaka Ayanokouji	Classroom of the Elite	Shōgo Kinugasa	Shunsaku Tomose	MF Bunko J
05	Shinei Nouzen	86	Asato Asato	Shirabi	Dengeki Bunko
06	Accelerator	A Certain Magical Index	Kazuma Kamachi	Kiyotaka Haimura	Dengeki Bunko
07	Rio	Seirei Gensouki	Yuri Kitayama	Riv	Hobby Japan
08	Bisco Akaboshi	Sabikui Bisco	Shinji Kobukubo	Akagishi K	Dengeki Bunko
09	Kazuma Sato	KonoSuba	Natsume Akatsuki	Kurone Mishima	Kadokawa Sneaker Bunko
10	Bell Cranel	Is It Wrong to Try to Pick Up Girls in a Dungeon?	Fujino Ōmori	Suzuhito Yasuda	GA Bunko

=== 2020–2024 ===
Rank	Character	Title	Author	Artist	Imprint
2020
01	Kiyotaka Ayanokouji	Classroom of the Elite	Shōgo Kinugasa	Shunsaku Tomose	MF Bunko J
02	Sakuta Azusagawa	Rascal Does Not Dream of Bunny Girl Senpai	Hajime Kamoshida	Keiji Mizoguchi	Dengeki Bunko
03	Tōma Kamijō	A Certain Magical Index	Kazuma Kamachi	Kiyotaka Haimura	Dengeki Bunko
04	Hachiman Hikigaya	My Youth Romantic Comedy Is Wrong, As I Expected	Wataru Watari	Ponkan8	Gagaga Bunko
05	Kazuto Kirigaya / Kirito	Sword Art Online	Reki Kawahara	Abec	Dengeki Bunko
06	Kazuma Sato	KonoSuba	Natsume Akatsuki	Kurone Mishima	Kadokawa Sneaker Bunko
07	Accelerator	A Certain Magical Index	Kazuma Kamachi	Kiyotaka Haimura	Dengeki Bunko
08	Bell Cranel	Is It Wrong to Try to Pick Up Girls in a Dungeon?	Fujino Ōmori	Suzuhito Yasuda	GA Bunko
09	Shinei Nouzen	86	Asato Asato	Shirabi	Dengeki Bunko
10	Fumiya Tomozaki	Bottom-Tier Character Tomozaki	Yūki Yaku	Fly	Gagaga Bunko
2021
01	Kiyotaka Ayanokouji	Classroom of the Elite	Shōgo Kinugasa	Shunsaku Tomose	MF Bunko J
02	Ferdinand	Ascendance of a Bookworm	Miya Kazuki	You Shiina	TO BOOKS
03	Hachiman Hikigaya	My Youth Romantic Comedy Is Wrong, As I Expected	Wataru Watari	Ponkan8	Gagaga Bunko
04	Chitose Saku	Chitose Is in the Ramune Bottle	Hiromu	raemz	Gagaga Bunko
05	Sakuta Azusagawa	Rascal Does Not Dream of Bunny Girl Senpai	Hajime Kamoshida	Keiji Mizoguchi	Dengeki Bunko
06	Kazuto Kirigaya / Kirito	Sword Art Online	Reki Kawahara	Abec	Dengeki Bunko
07	Tōma Kamijō	A Certain Magical Index	Kazuma Kamachi	Kiyotaka Haimura	Dengeki Bunko
08	Kazuma Sato	KonoSuba	Natsume Akatsuki	Kurone Mishima	Kadokawa Sneaker Bunko
09	Kimizuka Kimihiko	The Detective Is Already Dead	Nigojuu	Umibouzu	MF Bunko J
10	Tatsuya Shiba	The Irregular at Magic High School	Tsutomu Satou	Kana Ishida	Dengeki Bunko
2022
01	Kiyotaka Ayanokouji	Classroom of the Elite	Shōgo Kinugasa	Shunsaku Tomose	MF Bunko J
02	Chitose Saku	Chitose Is in the Ramune Bottle	Hiromu	raemz	Gagaga Bunko
03	Hachiman Hikigaya	My Youth Romantic Comedy Is Wrong, As I Expected	Wataru Watari	Ponkan8	Gagaga Bunko
04	Ferdinand	Ascendance of a Bookworm	Miya Kazuki	You Shiina	TO BOOKS
05	Amane Fujimiya	The Angel Next Door Spoils Me Rotten	Saekisan	Hazano Kazutake	GA Bunko
06	Kimizuka Kimihiko	The Detective Is Already Dead	Nigojuu	Umibouzu	MF Bunko J
07	Sakuta Azusagawa	Rascal Does Not Dream of Bunny Girl Senpai	Hajime Kamoshida	Keiji Mizoguchi	Dengeki Bunko
08	Shinei Nouzen	86	Asato Asato	Shirabi	Dengeki Bunko
09	Kazuto Kirigaya / Kirito	Sword Art Online	Reki Kawahara	Abec	Dengeki Bunko
10	Akira	Rebuild World	Nafuse	Gin	Dengeki no Shin Bungei
2023
01	Kiyotaka Ayanokouji	Classroom of the Elite	Shōgo Kinugasa	Shunsaku Tomose	MF Bunko J
02	Chitose Saku	Chitose Is in the Ramune Bottle	Hiromu	raemz	Gagaga Bunko
03	Amane Fujimiya	The Angel Next Door Spoils Me Rotten	Saekisan	Hazano Kazutake	GA Bunko
04	Hachiman Hikigaya	My Youth Romantic Comedy Is Wrong, As I Expected	Wataru Watari	Ponkan8	Gagaga Bunko
05	Ferdinand	Ascendance of a Bookworm	Miya Kazuki	You Shiina	TO BOOKS
06	Masachika Kuze	Alya Sometimes Hides Her Feelings in Russian	Sunsunsun	Momoco	Kadokawa Sneaker Bunko
07	Shinei Nouzen	86	Asato Asato	Shirabi	Dengeki Bunko
08	Kimizuka Kimihiko	The Detective Is Already Dead	Nigojuu	Umibouzu	MF Bunko J
09	Wolfred Scalfarotto	Dahlia in Bloom: Crafting a Fresh Start with Magical Tools	Hisaya Amagishi	Kei	MF Books
10	Yuuta Asamura	Days with My Stepsister	Ghost Mikawa	Hiten	MF Bunko J
2024
01	Amane Fujimiya	The Angel Next Door Spoils Me Rotten	Saekisan	Hazano Kazutake	GA Bunko
02	Masachika Kuze	Alya Sometimes Hides Her Feelings in Russian	Sunsunsun	Momoco	Kadokawa Sneaker Bunko
03	Kiyotaka Ayanokouji	Classroom of the Elite	Shōgo Kinugasa	Shunsaku Tomose	MF Bunko J
04	Lloyd Allen Wruning	The Person I Loved Asked Me to Die in My Sister's Stead	Nagano Mizuki	Toyota Saori	TO BOOKS
05	Safia Dianthus	The Villainess's Guide to (Not) Falling in Love	Touya	Yoimachi	Earth Star Novels
06	Sakuta Azusagawa	Rascal Does Not Dream of Bunny Girl Senpai	Hajime Kamoshida	Keiji Mizoguchi	Dengeki Bunko
07	Kimizuka Kimihiko	The Detective Is Already Dead	Nigojuu	Umibouzu	MF Bunko J
08	Chitose Saku	Chitose Is in the Ramune Bottle	Hiromu	raemz	Gagaga Bunko
09	Bell Cranel	Is It Wrong to Try to Pick Up Girls in a Dungeon?	Fujino Ōmori	Suzuhito Yasuda	GA Bunko
10	Shinei Nouzen	86	Asato Asato	Shirabi	Dengeki Bunko

=== 2025 ===
Rank	Character	Title	Author	Artist	Imprint
2025
1	Kazuhiko Nukumizu	Too Many Losing Heroines!	Takibi Amamori	Imigimuru	Gagaga Bunko
2	Masachika Kuze	Alya Sometimes Hides Her Feelings in Russian	SunSunSun	Momoco	Kadokawa Sneaker Bunko
3	Amane Fujimiya	The Angel Next Door Spoils Me Rotten	Saekisan	Hazano Kazutake	GA Bunko
4	Kiyotaka Ayanokouji	Classroom of the Elite	Shōgo Kinugasa	Shunsaku Tomose	MF Bunko J
5	Safia Dianthus	The Villainess's Guide to (Not) Falling in Love	Touya	Yoimachi	SQEX Novel
6	Yuuta Asamura	Days with My Stepsister	Ghost Mikawa	Hiten	MF Bunko J
7	Wolfred Scalfarotto	Dahlia in Bloom: Crafting a Fresh Start with Magical Tools	Hisaya Amagishi	Kei	MF Books
8	Sakuta Azusagawa	Rascal Does Not Dream of Bunny Girl Senpai	Hajime Kamoshida	Keiji Mizoguchi	Dengeki Bunko
9	Cid Kagenou	The Eminence in Shadow	Daisuke Aizawa	Tōzai	Enterbrain
10	Krai Andrey	Let This Grieving Soul Retire! Woe Is the Weakling Who Leads the Strongest Party	Tsukikage	Chyko	GC Novels

== Top 10 illustrator rankings ==
=== 2010–2014 ===
Rank	Artist	Notable works
2010
01	Miho Takeoka	Book Girl, Tasogareiro no Utatsukai
02	Noizi Ito	Shakugan no Shana, Haruhi Suzumiya
03	Hidari	Usotsuki Mii-kun to Kowareta Maa-chan
04	Yui Haga	Baka and Test
05	Meru Kishida	Heaven's Memo Pad
06	Buriki	Haganai, Ground Control to Psychoelectric Girl
07	Kouhaku Kuroboshi	Kino's Journey, Lillia and Treize, Meg and Seron
08	Kira Inugami	Student Council's Discretion
09	Ryō Ueda	Sayonara Piano Sonata
10	Yasu	Toradora!
2011
01	Kiyotaka Haimura	A Certain Magical Index
02	Buriki	Haganai, Ground Control to Psychoelectric Girl
03	Miho Takeoka	Book Girl, Tasogareiro no Utatsukai
04	Meru Kishida	Heaven's Memo Pad
05	Hidari	Usotsuki Mii-kun to Kowareta Maa-chan
06	Abec	Sword Art Online
07	Noizi Ito	Shakugan no Shana, Haruhi Suzumiya series
08	Yui Haga	Baka and Test
09	Kira Inugami	Student Council's Discretion
10	Suzuhito Yasuda	Durarara!!
2012
01	Buriki	Haganai, Ground Control to Psychoelectric Girl
02	Kiyotaka Haimura	A Certain Magical Index
03	Abec	Sword Art Online, Sword Art Online Progressive
04	Meru Kishida	Heaven's Memo Pad
05	Kantoku	The "Hentai" Prince and the Stony Cat.
06	Miho Takeoka	Book Girl, Tasogareiro no Utatsukai
07	Noizi Ito	Shakugan no Shana, Haruhi Suzumiya
08	Shiromizakana	Kokoro Connect, Tobira no Soto
09	Hiro Kanzaki	Oreimo
10	Hidari	Usotsuki Mii-kun to Kowareta Maa-chan
2013
01	Abec	Sword Art Online, Sword Art Online Progressive
02	Buriki	Haganai, Ground Control to Psychoelectric Girl
03	Kiyotaka Haimura	A Certain Magical Index
04	Shiromizakana	Kokoro Connect, Tobira no Soto
05	Kantoku	The "Hentai" Prince and the Stony Cat.
06	Ponkan8	My Youth Romantic Comedy Is Wrong, As I Expected
07	Miho Takeoka	Book Girl, Tasogareiro no Utatsukai
08	Meru Kishida	Heaven's Memo Pad
09	Hiro Kanzaki	Oreimo
09	Kobuichi	Aria the Scarlet Ammo
2014
01	Kiyotaka Haimura	A Certain Magical Index
02	Ponkan8	My Youth Romantic Comedy Is Wrong, As I Expected
03	Abec	Sword Art Online, Sword Art Online Progressive
04	Buriki	Haganai, Ground Control to Psychoelectric Girl
05	Kantoku	The "Hentai" Prince and the Stony Cat.
06	Tsunako	Date A Live
07	Miho Takeoka	Book Girl, Tasogareiro no Utatsukai
08	Hiro Kanzaki	Oreimo, Eromanga Sensei
09	Saki Ukai	Black Bullet
10	Suzuhito Yasuda	Durarara!!

=== 2015–2019 ===
Rank	Artist	Notable works
2015
01	Ponkan8	My Youth Romantic Comedy Is Wrong, As I Expected
02	Kiyotaka Haimura	A Certain Magical Index
03	Abec	Sword Art Online, Sword Art Online Progressive
04	Buriki	Boku wa Tomodachi ga Sukunai, Denpa Onna to Seishun Otoko
05	Saki Ukai	Black Bullet
06	Kantoku	The "Hentai" Prince and the Stony Cat., A Sister's All You Need
07	Miho Takeoka	Book Girl, Tasogareiro no Utatsukai, Hikaru ga Chikyū ni Itakoro
08	Yū Kamiya	No Game No Life
09	Suzuhito Yasuda	Durarara!!, Is It Wrong to Try to Pick Up Girls in a Dungeon?
10	Tsunako	Date A Live
2016
01	Ponkan8	My Youth Romantic Comedy Is Wrong, As I Expected
02	Kiyotaka Haimura	A Certain Magical Index
03	Abec	Sword Art Online, Sword Art Online Progressive
04	Kantoku	The "Hentai" Prince and the Stony Cat., A Sister's All You Need
05	Kurehito Misaki	Saekano: How to Raise a Boring Girlfriend
06	Suzuhito Yasuda	Durarara!!, Is It Wrong to Try to Pick Up Girls in a Dungeon?
07	Yū Kamiya	No Game No Life
08	Kurone Mishima	Akashic Records of Bastard Magic Instructor, KonoSuba
09	Tsunako	Date A Live
10	Saki Ukai	Black Bullet
2017
01	Kiyotaka Haimura	A Certain Magical Index
02	Abec	Sword Art Online, Sword Art Online Progressive
03	Kantoku	Hentai Ōji to Warawanai Neko., A Sister's All You Need
04	Kurone Mishima	Akashic Records of Bastard Magic Instructor, KonoSuba
05	Warainaku	Ninja Slayer
06	Ponkan8	My Youth Romantic Comedy Is Wrong, As I Expected
07	Kurehito Misaki	Saekano: How to Raise a Boring Girlfriend
08	Shirabii	The Ryuo's Work Is Never Done!
09	Shinichirou Ootsuka	Re:Zero -Starting Life in Another World-
10	Saki Ukai	Black Bullet, Torture Princess: Fremd Torturchen
2018
01	Kiyotaka Haimura	A Certain Magical Index
02	Abec	Sword Art Online, Sword Art Online Progressive
03	Kurone Mishima	Akashic Records of Bastard Magic Instructor, KonoSuba
04	Ponkan8	My Youth Romantic Comedy Is Wrong, As I Expected
05	Keeji Mizoguchi	The Pet Girl of Sakurasou, Rascal Does Not Dream of Bunny Girl Senpai series
06	Kantoku	The "Hentai" Prince and the Stony Cat., A Sister's All You Need
07	Kurehito Misaki	Saekano: How to Raise a Boring Girlfriend
08	Shirabi	The Ryuo's Work Is Never Done!
09	Saki Ukai	Black Bullet, Torture Princess: Fremd Torturchen
10	Hiro Kanzaki	Oreimo, Eromanga Sensei
2019
01	Shirabi	The Ryuo's Work Is Never Done!, 86
02	Kyotaka Haimura	A Certain Magical Index
03	Fly	Bottom-tier Character Tomozaki
04	Kantoku	The "Hentai" Prince and the Stony Cat., A Sister's All You Need
05	Kurone Mishima	Akashic Records of Bastard Magic Instructor, KonoSuba
06	Keiji Mizoguchi	The Pet Girl of Sakurasou, Rascal Does Not Dream of Bunny Girl Senpai series
07	Abec	Sword Art Online, Sword Art Online Progressive
08	Saki Ukai	Black Bullet, Torture Princess: Fremd Torturchen
09	Riv	Seirei Gensouki: Spirit Chronicles
10	Shunsaku Tomose	Classroom of the Elite

=== 2020–2024 ===
Rank	Artist	Notable works
2020
01	Shirabii	The Ryuo's Work Is Never Done!, 86
02	Fly	Bottom-tier Character Tomozaki
03	Shunsaku Tomose	Classroom of the Elite
04	Keeji Mizoguchi	The Pet Girl of Sakurasou, Rascal Does Not Dream of Bunny Girl Senpai series
05	Kurone Mishima	Akashic Records of Bastard Magic Instructor, KonoSuba
06	Kiyotaka Haimura	A Certain Magical Index
07	Kantoku	The "Hentai" Prince and the Stony Cat., A Sister's All You Need
08	Azul	Wandering Witch: The Journey of Elaina
09	Abec	Sword Art Online, Sword Art Online Progressive
10	Saki Ukai	Black Bullet, Torture Princess: Fremd Torturchen
2021
01	Shunsaku Tomose	Classroom of the Elite
02	Fly	Bottom-tier Character Tomozaki
03	Shirabi	The Ryuo's Work Is Never Done!, 86
04	Ui Shigure	Osamake: Romcom Where The Childhood Friend Won't Lose
05	Kurone Mishima	Akashic Records of Bastard Magic Instructor, KonoSuba
06	Keeji Mizoguchi	The Pet Girl of Sakurasou, Rascal Does Not Dream of Bunny Girl Senpai series
07	Tomari	Spy Classroom
08	Kureta	Ishura
09	You Shiina	Ascendance of a Bookworm
10	Hanekoto	The Angel Next Door Spoils Me Rotten
2022
01	Shunsaku Tomose	Classroom of the Elite
02	Raemz	Chitose Is in the Ramune Bottle
03	Shirabi	The Ryuo's Work Is Never Done!, 86
04	Hanekoto	The Angel Next Door Spoils Me Rotten
05	Hiten	Days with My Stepsister
06	Umibouzu	The Detective Is Already Dead
07	Fly	Bottom-tier Character Tomozaki
08	Ui Shigure	Osamake: Romcom Where The Childhood Friend Won't Lose
09	You Shiina	Ascendance of a Bookworm
10	Momoco	Alya Sometimes Hides Her Feelings in Russian
2023
01	Shunsaku Tomose	Classroom of the Elite
02	Raemz	Chitose Is in the Ramune Bottle
03	Hanekoto	The Angel Next Door Spoils Me Rotten
04	Hiten	Days with My Stepsister
05	Momoco	Alya Sometimes Hides Her Feelings in Russian
06	Umibouzu	The Detective Is Already Dead
07	You Shiina	Ascendance of a Bookworm
08	Shirabi	The Ryuo's Work Is Never Done!, 86
09	Ui Shigure	Osamake: Romcom Where The Childhood Friend Won't Lose
10	Fly	Bottom-tier Character Tomozaki
2024
01	Hanekoto	The Angel Next Door Spoils Me Rotten
02	Momoco	Alya Sometimes Hides Her Feelings in Russian
03	Shunsaku Tomose	Classroom of the Elite
04	Raemz	Chitose Is in the Ramune Bottle
05	Umibouzu	The Detective Is Already Dead
06	Saori Toyota	The Person I Loved Asked Me to Die in My Sister's Stead
07	Hiten	Days with My Stepsister
08	Wan Hachipisu	7th Time Loop
09	Shirabi	The Ryuo's Work Is Never Done!, 86
10	Yoimachi	The Villainess’s Guide to (Not) Falling in Love

=== 2025–2029 ===
Rank	Artist	Notable works
2025
1	Imigimuru	Too Many Losing Heroines!
2	Hanekoto	The Angel Next Door Spoils Me Rotten
3	Momoco	Alya Sometimes Hides Her Feelings in Russian
4	Hiten	Days with My Stepsister
5	Umibouzu	The Detective Is Already Dead
6	Shunsaku Tomose	Classroom of the Elite
7	Yoimachi	The Villainess's Guide to (Not) Falling in Love
8	Raemz	Chitose Is in the Ramune Bottle
9	Saori Toyota	The Person I Loved Asked Me to Die in My Sister's Stead
10	Kantoku	A Salad Bowl of Eccentrics, Sasaki and Peeps
2026
1	Hanekoto	The Angel Next Door Spoils Me Rotten
2	Imigimuru	Too Many Losing Heroines!
3	Momoco	Alya Sometimes Hides Her Feelings in Russian
4	Saori Toyota	The Person I Loved Asked Me to Die in My Sister's Stead
5	Eku Takeshima	Watashi ga Koibito ni Nareru Wake Nai jan, Muri Muri! (※Muri ja Nakatta!?)
6	Hachi Komada	Dahlia in Bloom
7	Yoimachi	The Villainess's Guide to (Not) Falling in Love
8	U35	Buying a Classmate Once a Week
9	Ogipote	Kochira, Shūmatsu Teitai Iinkai
10	Hiten	Days with My Stepsister

== Top 10 light novels of the decade ==
=== Decade of 2010s ===
Rank	Title	Author	Artist	Imprint
2010s
01	Sword Art Online	Reki Kawahara	abec	Dengeki Bunko
02	A Certain Magical Index	Kazuma Kamachi	Kiyotaka Haimura	Dengeki Bunko
03	The Ryuo's Work Is Never Done!	Shirow Shiratori	Shirabi	GA Bunko
04	Is It Wrong to Try to Pick Up Girls in a Dungeon?	Fujino Ōmori	Suzuhito Yasuda	GA Bunko
05	Alderamin on the Sky	Bokuto Uno	Sanbasō	Dengeki Bunko
06	No Game No Life	Yū Kamiya		MF Bunko J
07	Ascendance of a Bookworm	Miya Kazuki	You Shiina	TO BOOKS
08	The Irregular at Magic High School	Tsutomu Satou	Kana Ishida	Dengeki Bunko
09	Bottom-tier Character Tomozaki	Yūki Yaku	Fly	Gagaga Bunko
10	Monogatari series	Nisio Isin	Vofan	Kodansha Box

== See also ==
- Kono Mystery ga Sugoi!
- Kono Manga ga Sugoi!
