= The Villainess's Guide to (Not) Falling in Love =

Japanese light novel series

- First light novel volume cover

悪役令嬢は溺愛ルートに入りました!? (Akuyaku Reijō wa Dekiai Rūto ni Hairimashita!?)
- Genre: Isekai; Romantic comedy
- Novel series
- Written by: Touya
- Published by: Shōsetsuka ni Narō
- Original run: February 14, 2020 – present
- Light novel
- Written by: Touya
- Illustrated by: Yoimachi
- Published by: Square Enix
- Imprint: SQEX Novel
- Original run: February 5, 2021 – present
- Volumes: 10
- Manga
- Written by: Touya; Shiori Shiono (composition)
- Illustrated by: Ren Sakuma
- Published by: Square Enix
- English publisher: NA: Square Enix
- Imprint: Gangan Comics UP!
- Magazine: Manga Up!
- Original run: February 12, 2022 – present
- Volumes: 7

The Villainess's Guide to (Not) Falling in Love (悪役令嬢は溺愛ルートに入りました!?, Akyuaku Reijō wa Dekiai Rūto ni Hairimashita?!) is a Japanese light novel series written by Touya and illustrated by Yoimachi. It originally began serialization on the user-generated novel publishing website Shōsetsuka ni Narō in February 2020. It was later acquired by Square Enix who began publishing it under their SQEX Novel light novel imprint in February 2021. A manga adaptation illustrated by Ren Sakuma began serialization on Square Enix's Manga Up! manga website in February 2022.

== Synopsis ==
Luciana Dianthus suddenly remembers that in her past life she was a 30-something virgin, and that she was the villainous young lady in the otome game "Magic Kingdom Cinderella," which she played so much that she became obsessed with it. Luciana desperately tries to trace her memories and discovers that the event of her condemnation will occur one year from now. In order to avoid the event of her condemnation, Luciana tries to avoid the men who are her romantic targets, but contrary to her wishes, the men begin to approach her.

== Media ==
=== Light novel ===
Written by Touya, The Villainess's Guide to (Not) Falling in Love began serialization on the user-generated novel publishing website Shōsetsuka ni Narō on February 14, 2020. It was later acquired by Square Enix who began publishing it under their SQEX Novel light novel imprint with illustrations by Yoimachi on February 5, 2021. Ten volumes have been released as of June 5, 2026.

No.	Release date	ISBN
1	February 5, 2021	978-4-7575-7063-4
2	August 6, 2021	978-4-7575-7411-3
3	March 7, 2022	978-4-7575-7800-5
4	September 7, 2022	978-4-7575-8130-2
5	March 7, 2023	978-4-7575-8459-4
6	September 7, 2023	978-4-7575-8777-9
7	May 7, 2024	978-4-7575-8983-4
8	December 6, 2024	978-4-7575-9541-5
9	October 7, 2025	978-4-301-00108-9
10	June 5, 2026	978-4-301-00568-1

=== Manga ===
A manga adaptation illustrated by Ren Sakuma and with composition by Shiori Shiono began serialization on Square Enix's Manga Up! manga website on February 12, 2022. Its chapters have been compiled into seven tankōbon volumes as of June 2026. The manga adaptation is published in English on Square Enix's Manga UP! Global website and app. During their panel at Anime Expo 2023, Square Enix Manga & Books announced that they would begin releasing volumes in English on March 12, 2024.

No.	Original release date	Original ISBN	North American release date	North American ISBN
1	September 7, 2022	978-4-7575-8127-2	March 12, 2024	978-1-64609-294-9
1. "I Must Avoid Lakas... Right?"; 2. "Lakas's Beloved"; 3. "Duke Fritillaria's Birthday Celebration"; 4. "The Proud Black Lily"; 5. "The Yggdrasil Mage"; Special side story: "Lakas's Perspective: Let Me Be Your Black Lily"
2	March 7, 2023	978-4-7575-8455-6	July 23, 2024	978-1-64609-295-6
6. "Fate Revealed by Foresight"; 7. "Conrad's Room"; 8. "The Power of Enchantment"; 9. "The Beautiful Commander of the Terrestrial Magic Division"; Special side story: "Lakas's Perspective: The Black Lily Envies the Wisteria"
3	September 7, 2023	978-4-7575-8775-5	November 19, 2024	978-1-64609-307-6
10. "My Impressive Brother"; 11. "An Offering of the Finest Wine"; 12. "A Banquet at the House of Wisteria"; 13. "The Evil Star of the East"; Bonus: "A Day Out with Saphir"; Special side story: "What if I Were a Mermaid?"
4	May 7, 2024	978-4-7575-9180-6; 978-4-7575-9181-3 (SE)	July 15, 2025	978-1-64609-373-1
14. "Sharing the Secret"; 15. "Daryl's Dream"; 16. "Precious Things"; 17. "To the Other Me"; Special side story: "Lakas's Perspective: Awakening Emotions"
5	December 6, 2024	978-4-7575-9499-9	January 6, 2026	978-1-64609-438-7
18. "Summoned to Cataleya's Castle"; 19. "Found at Last"; 20. "To Be Protected at All Costs"; 21. "The Dianthus Endowment"; Bonus: "Let's Play the "I Love You" Game"; Special side story: "Joshua's Perspective: My Choice"
6	October 7, 2025	978-4-301-00103-4; 978-4-301-00104-1 (SE)	November 3, 2026	979-8-8991-0040-6
22. "Encounter"; 23. "The Wisteria Family Legend"; 24. "The Guardian's Blessing"; 25. "Because You're My Only Sibling"; Special side story: "The Job of a Villainess"
7	June 5, 2026	978-4-301-00564-3	—	—

== Reception ==
The series was ranked sixth overall at the 2021 Next Light Novel Awards. The series won the 2022 edition in the tankōbon category. The series was ranked third in the 2024 and 2025 editions of Takarajimasha's Kono Light Novel ga Sugoi! guidebook in the tankōbon category.

== See also ==
- A Tale of the Secret Saint, another light novel series with the same writer
