= I'm Fine With Being the Second Girlfriend =

Japanese light novel series

- First light novel volume cover

わたし、二番目の彼女でいいから。 (Watashi, Nibanme no Kanojo de Ii kara)
- Genre: Romantic comedy
- Light novel
- Written by: Jōyō Nishi
- Illustrated by: ReTake
- Published by: ASCII Media Works
- Imprint: Dengeki Bunko
- Original run: September 10, 2021 – May 9, 2026
- Volumes: 9
- Manga
- Written by: Jōyō Nishi
- Illustrated by: Ninoko
- Published by: ASCII Media Works
- English publisher: NA: Seven Seas Entertainment
- Imprint: Dengeki Comics NEXT
- Magazine: Dengeki Comic Regulus
- Original run: September 23, 2022 – present
- Volumes: 3

I'm Fine With Being the Second Girlfriend (わたし、二番目の彼女でいいから。, Watashi, Nibanme no Kanojo de Ii kara) is a Japanese light novel series written by Jōyō Nishi and illustrated by ReTake. It was published in nine volumes under ASCII Media Works' Dengeki Bunko imprint from September 2021 to May 2026. A manga adaptation illustrated by Ninoko began serialization on ASCII Media Works' Dengeki Comic Regulus website in September 2022 and has been compiled into three tankōbon volumes as of January 2026.

== Plot ==
The series follows Shirō Kirishima, a high school classmate who has a close relationship with Akane Hayasaka. Although both act distant in public, in secret they act as lovers. They do so because both have feelings for other people but cannot have a relationship with them: Shirō's crush Hikari Tachibana already has a boyfriend, while Akane is also unable to be with her crush. Despite seeing each other as their second choice, Shirō and Akane find themselves becoming closer together as time goes on.

== Characters ==
Shirō Kirishima (桐島 司郎, Kirishima Shirō)
The protagonist. He is in love with Hikari Tachibana, but settles for Akane in the meantime as Hikari already has a boyfriend. He initially sees their relationship as temporary, with each other supporting their true crushes, although he finds himself falling for Akane more as time goes on.
Akane Hayasaka (早坂 あかね, Hayasaka Akane)
Voiced by: Rie Takahashi (PV)
Shirō's current girlfriend. She is dating him as she is unable to have a relationship with her actual crush. She is an honor student and is popular, being the recipient of multiple confessions. She has a crush on Yanagi, Shirō's senior when he was in elementary school.
Hikari Tachibana (橘 ひかり, Tachibana Hikari)
Voiced by: Reina Ueda (PV)
The student council president and Shirō's crush. She has a boyfriend, much to Shirō's disappointment. She plays the piano. She and Shirō bond over literature, with him becoming the subject of her advances. Her boyfriend comes from a wealthy family and she is engaged to him, with their marriage planned to happen after she graduates from high school.
Akira Tōno (遠野 あきら, Tōno Akira)
One of Shirō's classmates and friends after he goes to a university in Kyoto. She is part of the volleyball team.
Shiori Miyamae (宮前 しおり, Miyamae Shiori)
One of Shirō's classmates and friends after he goes to a university in Kyoto. Her beauty has been compared to that of a model.

== Media ==
=== Light novels ===
The series is written by Jōyō Nishi and illustrated by ReTake. It was published in nine volumes under ASCII Media Works' Dengeki Bunko imprint from September 10, 2021, to May 9, 2026. A promotional video featuring Rie Takahashi as Akane Hayasaka and Reina Ueda as Hikari Tachibana was released in September 2022, coinciding with the launch of the manga adaptation.

No.	Japanese release date	Japanese ISBN
1	September 10, 2021	978-4-04-913583-1
2	January 8, 2022	978-4-04-914154-2
3	May 10, 2022	978-4-04-914232-7
4	September 9, 2022	978-4-04-914401-7
5	January 7, 2023	978-4-04-914688-2
6	July 7, 2023	978-4-04-915128-2
7	March 8, 2024	978-4-04-915445-0
8	March 7, 2025	978-4-04-915914-1
9	May 9, 2026	978-4-04-915915-8

=== Manga ===
A manga adaptation illustrated by Ninoko began serialization on ASCII Media Works' Dengeki Comic Regulus website on September 23, 2022. It has been compiled into three tankōbon volumes as of January 2026. The manga adaptation is licensed in English by Seven Seas Entertainment, who publish it under their Ghost Ship imprint.

No.	Original release date	Original ISBN	English release date	English ISBN
1	July 27, 2023	978-4-04-915006-3	July 14, 2026	979-8-89765-752-0
2	September 27, 2024	978-4-04-915935-6	November 3, 2026	979-8-89765-760-5
3	January 27, 2026	978-4-04-916862-4	—	—

=== Other ===
An ASMR product was released on March 8, 2024, with Takahashi reprising her role as Akane.

== Reception ==
The series ranked 17th in the general category at the Tsugi ni Kuru Light Novel Awards in 2021. In 2023, the series ranked 3rd in the general new works category and 7th in the paperback category in the 2023 edition of Kono Light Novel ga Sugoi!. The eight volume's obi reported that the series has sold over 350,000 copies both physically and digitally.
