= This Is the End Stagnation Committee =

Japanese light novel series

- First light novel volume cover

こちら、終末停滞委員会。 (Kochira, Shūmatsu Teitai Iinkai)
- Genre: Action, science fantasy
- Light novel
- Written by: Kien Aien
- Illustrated by: Ogipote
- Published by: ASCII Media Works
- Imprint: Dengeki Bunko
- Original run: July 10, 2024 – present
- Volumes: 6
- Manga
- Written by: Kien Aien
- Illustrated by: Yutaka Sakurai
- Published by: Kadokawa Shoten
- Imprint: Kadokawa Comics A
- Magazine: Shōnen Ace Plus
- Original run: April 29, 2025 – present
- Volumes: 2
- Anime

This Is the End Stagnation Committee (Japanese: こちら、終末停滞委員会。, Hepburn: Kochira, Shūmatsu Teitai Iinkai) is a Japanese light novel series written by Kien Aien and illustrated by Ogipote. It began publication under ASCII Media Works' Dengeki Bunko imprint in July 2024, and has been compiled into six volumes as of July 2026. A manga adaptation illustrated by Yutaka Sakurai began serialization on Kadokawa Shoten's Shōnen Ace Plus service in April 2025 and has been compiled into two tankōbon volumes as of July 2026. An anime adaptation has been announced.

== Plot ==
The series follows Kotoha Kotoyorozu, a former member of the mafia. After years of being forced to work for the mafia after being kidnapped, he somehow finds himself reincarnated in another world after wishing for a better life. He finds himself becoming involved with a group of girls calling themselves the Apocalypse Stagnation Committee and starting a new life as a student at Azure Academy, living the high school life he was never able to live.

== Characters ==
Kotoha Kotoyorozu (言万 心葉, Kotoyorozu Kotoha)
A former member of the mafia, who loses his life in a drowning incident. Raised in a temple, he had been kidnapped and forced to work with a mafia, where he gained the nickname "Whisperer". Prior to his death, he felt regret about being unable to live a normal high school life due to his life as a slave for the mafia.
Luna
Voiced by: Ayane Sakura (PV)
A robotic maid and one of the members of the Apocalypse Stagnation Committee.
Hikari Koito (恋兎 ひかり, Koito Hikari)
A member of the Apocalypse Stagnation Committee. As the oldest member, she serves as the group's leader. She has short red hair and animal ears.
Nyao Koshiba (小柴 ニャオ, Koshiba Nyao)
A member of the Apocalypse Stagnation Committee. She has long twintailed hair.
Elif Anatolia (エリフ・アナトリア, Erifu Anatoria)
Voiced by: Inori Minase (PV)
The student council president of Azure Academy, who keeps her true identity secret from the student body.

== Media ==
=== Light novel ===
The series is written by Kien Aien and illustrated by Ogipote. It began publication under ASCII Media Works' Dengeki Bunko imprint on July 10, 2024, and has been compiled into six volumes as of July 2026. A promotional video narrated by Inori Minase was released in January 2025 to promote the release of the third volume.

A spin-off novel illustrated by Asanaya was serialized in eight chapters on Dengeki Bunko's Dengeki Novecomi web service from March 13 to May 2, 2025.

No.	Japanese release date	Japanese ISBN
1	July 10, 2024	978-4-04-915800-7
2	September 10, 2024	978-4-04-915906-6
3	January 10, 2025	978-4-04-916094-9
4	June 10, 2025	978-4-04-916413-8
5	December 10, 2025	978-4-04-916414-5
6	July 10, 2026	978-4-04-952304-1

=== Manga ===
A manga adaptation illustrated by Yutaka Sakurai began serialization on Kadokawa Shoten's Shōnen Ace Plus service on April 29, 2025. The first tankōbon volume was released on October 23, 2025; two volumes have been released as of July 10, 2026.

No.	Japanese release date	Japanese ISBN
1	October 23, 2025	978-4-04-116613-0
2	July 10, 2026	978-4-04-117253-7

=== Anime ===
An anime adaptation was announced during the "Dengeki Bunko Fall Festival Online 2026" livestream event on October 3, 2026.

== Reception ==
The series placed in multiple categories at the 2025 Kono Light Novel ga Sugoi! Awards, ranking 2nd in the New Releases category and 4th in the Paperback category.
