= Shiroki Teikoku =

Japanese light novel series

- First light novel volume cover

白き帝国
- Genre: Fantasy, military
- Light novel
- Written by: Koroku Inumura
- Illustrated by: Kotarō
- Published by: Shogakukan
- Imprint: Gagaga Bunko
- Original run: February 19, 2024 – August 18, 2026
- Volumes: 8

Shiroki Teikoku (白き帝国; lit. 'White Empire') is a Japanese light novel series written by Koroku Inumura and illustrated by Kotarō. It was published in eight volumes under Shogakukan's Gagaga Bunko imprint from February 2024 to August 2026.

== Plot ==
The series follows a war between various nations surrounding the Sea of Grapes. Among those involved are the Kingdom of Gattoland, a nation ruled by a tribe of cat-eared humans, and a group known as the Black Rose Knights. The first novel focuses on Toto Gattoland, a prince from Gottoland. One day, he encounters Artemisia, a human girl who had been taken hostage by a group known as the Black Rose Knights. The two immediately develop a connection; however, their relationship becomes complicated due to tensions between Gattoland's people and humans. Nevertheless, the two develop feelings for each other. The later novels focus on the events of the war that followed the destruction of Gattoland.

== Characters ==
Toto Gattoland (トト・ガトランド, Toto Gatorando)
A prince from the Kingdom of Gattoland, whose dream is to stop the fighting between the nations and to unite them under one peaceful nation, the White Country. He encounters Artemisia and the two develop feelings for each other, although their relationship is ultimately doomed. Despite being strong, he acts weak so that his older brother Gaga would get more attention from the people.
Artemisia (アルテミシア, Arutemishia)
A human girl who was taken hostage by the Black Rose Knights. She later comes under the care of the Gattoland royal family and forms a relationship with Toto. She hoped to establish cordial relations between humans and the cat-eared tribe that ruled over Gattoland.
Ruru Gattoland (ルル・ガトランド, Ruru Gatorando)
Toto's older sister and a princess of Gattoland. She has a cheerful personality and is popular among the kingdom's citizens. Due to her popularity and royal status, she has many suitors, though she has turned them down because she wants to live freely.
Shushu Gattoland (シュシュ・ガトランド, Shushu Gatorando)
The oldest princess of Gattoland. She is blind and spends her time playing the lute and being secluded from others, as she does not want to be a burden to the royal family and the country.
Gaga Gattoland (ガガ・ガトランド, Gaga Gatorando)
The oldest prince of Gattoland, who has a kind personality.
Dada Gattoland VII (ダダ・ガトランド七世, Dada Gatorando Nanase)
The king of Gattoland, who developed it from a small nation to becoming a strong military power thanks to his military prowess. He is not close to his queen and has a large harem of concubines and hundreds of children.

== Publication ==
The series is written by Koroku Inumura and features illustrations by Kotarō. It was published in eight volumes by Shogakukan under their Gagaga Bunko imprint from February 19, 2024, to August 18, 2026.

No.	Release date	ISBN
1	February 19, 2024	978-4-09-453119-0
2	July 18, 2024	978-4-09-453195-4
3	January 20, 2025	978-4-09-453227-2
4	May 19, 2025	978-4-09-453244-9
5	August 20, 2025	978-4-09-453256-2
6	December 18, 2025	978-4-09-453274-6
7	July 17, 2026	978-4-09-453302-6
8	August 18, 2026	978-4-09-453306-4

== Reception ==
The series was nominated for the 2025 edition of Kono Light Novel ga Sugoi!, placing 6th in the paperback category.

== See also ==
- The Pilot's Love Song, another light novel series written by Koroku Inumura
- The Princess and the Pilot, another light novel series written by Koroku Inumura
