= Tensei Teido de Mune no Ana wa Umanaranai =

Japanese light novel series

- First light novel volume cover

転生程度で胸の穴は埋まらない
- Genre: Fantasy, isekai
- Novel series
- Written by: Niteron
- Published by: Kakuyomu; Hameln
- Original run: April 26, 2024 – present
- Light novel
- Written by: Niteron
- Illustrated by: Isshiki
- Published by: ASCII Media Works
- Imprint: Dengeki Bunko
- Original run: January 10, 2025 – present
- Volumes: 5
- Manga
- Written by: Niteron
- Illustrated by: Ryōichi Otama
- Published by: Kadokawa Shoten
- Magazine: KadoComi (Isekai Comic)
- Original run: June 26, 2026 – present

Tensei Teido de Mune no Ana wa Umanaranai (転生程度で胸の穴は埋まらない; lit. "The Hole in My Heart Cannot Be Filled With Reincarnation") is a Japanese light novel series written by Niteron and illustrated by Isshiki. It was originally serialized as a web novel on the online services Kakuyomu and Hameln, before being published by ASCII Media Works under their Dengeki Bunko imprint since January 2025. A manga adaptation illustrated by Ryōichi Otama began serialization on Kadokawa's KadoComi manga service under the Isekai Comic label in June 2026.

== Plot ==
The series is set in a world where people can turn their desires into magic. Particularly strong magicians, known as the Adept, are tasked with protecting the world from threats. Konoe, a man who was reincarnated into this world, lives with the trauma of his past life and has become distrustful of others. His disillusion grows as he trains to become an Adept, his disillusion not going away even after becoming an Adept. However, following an encounter with a sick woman named Telnerica, his life changes, seeing Telnerica as filling the void that has long existed in his heart.

== Characters ==
Konoe (コノエ)
A man who is still living with regrets from his past life. After dying from illness in his early twenties, he is reincarnated into another world with the ability to perform Life Magic. Because of his ordinary life, he envied harem stories where the protagonist was in a relationship with many women. In his new life, he trained to become an Adept, but found his training difficult. After several years of training, he finally becomes an Adept, although he has become disillusioned. He then encounters Telnerica, a young elf woman who is gravely ill, using his newfound status to heal her. Some time later, the two start living together.
Telnerica (テルネリカ, Terunerika)
A young elf woman who came from a noble family. She first encounters Konoe while seeking help. At the time, she was suffering from a serious illness that caused her body to decay, although he was able to heal her. They later start living together and form a relationship.
Melmina (メルミナ, Merumina)
A red-haired Adept who becomes interested in Konoe.
Goddess (神様, Kamisama)

== Media ==
=== Light novel ===
Niteron originally began serializing the series as a web novel on Kadokawa's online publishing platform Kakuyomu, as well as the online service Hameln, on April 26, 2024. It was later picked up for publication by Kadokawa's ASCII Media Works subsidiary, which began publishing it as a light novel under their Dengeki Bunko imprint on January 10, 2025; the novels are illustrated by Isshiki. Five volumes have been released as of September 10, 2026.

No.	Release date	ISBN
1	January 10, 2025	978-4-04-916099-4
2	June 10, 2025	978-4-04-916306-3
3	September 10, 2025	978-4-04-916595-1
4	March 10, 2026	978-4-04-916937-9
5	September 10, 2026	978-4-04-916938-6

=== Manga ===
A manga adaptation illustrated by Ryōichi Otama was announced on November 25, 2025. It began serialization on Kadokawa's KadoComi manga service under the Isekai Comic label on June 26, 2026.

== Reception ==
The series was cited in the 2026 edition of Kono Light Novel ga Sugoi!, placing fifth in the paperback category and second in the new release paperback category.
