= The Person I Loved Asked Me to Die in My Sister's Stead =

Japanese light novel series

- First light novel volume cover

恋した人は、妹の代わりに死んでくれと言った。―妹と結婚した片思い相手がなぜ今さら私のもとに？と思ったら― (Koishita Hito wa, Imōto no Kawari ni Shindekure to Itta: Imōto to Kekkonshita Kataomoi Aite ga Naze Imasara Watashi no Moto ni? To Omottara)
- Genre: Action, isekai, romance
- Novel series
- Written by: Mizuki Nagano
- Published by: Shōsetsuka ni Narō
- Original run: November 20, 2020 – September 28, 2022
- Light novel
- Written by: Mizuki Nagano
- Illustrated by: Saori Toyota
- Published by: TO Books
- Imprint: TO Bunko
- Original run: September 10, 2021 – present
- Volumes: 8 + 1 short story
- Manga
- Written by: Mizuki Nagano
- Illustrated by: Maki Yamori
- Published by: TO Books
- English publisher: NA: Tokyopop
- Imprint: Corona Comics
- Magazine: Corona EX
- Original run: June 6, 2022 – present
- Volumes: 6
- Anime

The Person I Loved Asked Me to Die in My Sister's Stead (Japanese: 恋した人は、妹の代わりに死んでくれと言った。―妹と結婚した片思い相手がなぜ今さら私のもとに？と思ったら―, Hepburn: Koishita Hito wa, Imōto no Kawari ni Shindekure to Itta: Imōto to Kekkonshita Kataomoi Aite ga Naze Imasara Watashi no Moto ni? To Omottara) is a Japanese light novel series written by Mizuki Nagano and illustrated by Saori Toyota. It was serialized online from November 2020 to September 2022 on the user-generated novel publishing website Shōsetsuka ni Narō. It was later acquired by TO Books, who has published eight volumes and a short stories collection since September 2021. After October 2022, the published novel on Shōsetsuka ni Narō is no longer accessible.

In addition to the print release, a manga adaptation by Maki Yamori has been serialized via TO Books' Corona EX manga website since June 2022. Six volumes have been published by TO Books. The English version of the manga has been released since July 2024, published by Tokyopop.

The first drama CD written by Mizuki Nagano was released in August 2024. The first volume of the audiobook in Japanese was released on Audible, narrated by Haruka Kajiyama. An anime adaptation has been announced.

== Plot ==
Wisteria, who lost her birth parents in an accident, was raised as an adopted child in an earl's family. From a young age, she secretly held romantic feelings for her childhood friend, Bright, whose lack of magical ability made him fail to match the talented reputation of his ducal family. Wisteria wanted to help him use magic, and devoted herself to researching the Predawn Realm, a dangerous netherworld filled with miasma, the source of magic.

One day, her stepsister Rosalie was chosen as the guardian of the Predawn Realm, meaning that if she were to accept this, she would never be able to return to her world. Bright, who had fallen in love with Rosalie and was desperate to save her, asked Wisteria to volunteer herself as guardian instead of Rosalie. Wisteria agreed, and took Rosalie's place as guardian of the Predawn Realm. Though the guardians were expected to die alone there, she survived with the help of the sacred sword Sartis.

Wisteria fought monsters in solitude for 23 years, until a man with a striking resemblance to Bright entered the Predawn Realm. This man, Lloyd, revealed himself to be Bright and Rosalie's son, and became Wisteria's disciple in order to eventually surpass her and claim Sartis for himself.

== Characters ==
Wisteria Irene
Voiced by: Fairouz Ai (first drama CD), Mayuko Kazama (second drama CD)
The protagonist of the story, who has been the guardian of "The Predawn Realm" for 23 years. She lives with the sacred sword Sartis who can talk. She is in her 40s, but her appearance hasn't changed since entering the Predawn Realm when she was 20 years old. In the original world, she is apparently feared as a "witch".
• Kono Light Novel ga Sugoi! 2024 - 3rd place (Female Character)
Sacred sword Sartis
Voiced by: Kenji Hamada (first drama CD), Junichi Suwabe (second drama CD)
A sentient sword that has existed since the age of mythology. Ever since feeling pity for Wisteria's circumstances and accompanying her to the Predawn Realm, it has been by her side for 23 years. With formidable power and self-awareness, there had been no one for a long time who could truly master it.
Lloyd Allen-Wruining
Voiced by: Yu Miyazaki (first drama CD), Junya Enoki (second drama CD)
A 22-year-old young man who arrived at the Predawn Realm. The son of Bright and Rosalie, making him Wisteria's nephew without blood ties. While declaring his intention to defeat Wisteria and claim the sacred sword Sartis, he also proposes to become her disciple.
• Kono Light Novel ga Sugoi! 2024 - 4th place (Male Character)

== Media ==
=== Light novels ===
The light novels are written by Mizuki Nagano and illustrated by Saori Toyota. Eight volumes and a short stories collection have been published since September 10, 2021, under TO Books.

No.	Release date	ISBN
1	September 10, 2021	978-4-86699-322-5
2	November 10, 2021	978-4-86699-366-9
3	July 9, 2022	978-4-86699-568-7
4	May 20, 2023	978-4-86699-853-4
5	December 1, 2023	978-4-86794-018-1
6	August 1, 2024	978-4-86794-270-3
SS	December 2, 2024	978-4-86794-376-2
7	May 1, 2025	978-4-86794-558-2
8	January 10, 2026	978-4-86794-822-4
9	November 1, 2026	978-4-86854-192-9

=== Manga ===
A manga adaptation by Maki Yamori has been serialized online via TO Books' Corona EX manga website since June 6, 2022. Six volumes have been published since October 1, 2022, by TO Books. The English translation of the manga has been licensed to Tokyopop on March 23, 2024.

No.	Original release date	Original ISBN	North American release date	North American ISBN
1	October 1, 2022	978-4-86699-680-6	July 15, 2024 (digital); December 3, 2024 (print)	978-1-4278-8035-2
2	May 15, 2023	978-486699-844-2	October 15, 2024 (digital); February 18, 2025 (print)	978-1-4278-8160-1
3	December 1, 2023	978-486794-014-3	January 6, 2025 (digital); April 22, 2025 (print)	978-1-4278-8090-1
4	August 1, 2024	978-4-86794-262-8	August 5, 2025 (print)	978-1-42788-260-8
5	May 1, 2025	978-4-86794-552-0	–	—
6	January 10, 2026	978-4-86794-815-6	–	—
7	October 1, 2026	978-4-86854-136-3	–	—

=== Audiobook ===
Six volumes of audiobook in Japanese have been released on Audible, narrated by Haruka Kajiyama.

No.	Release date	ASIN
1	August 1, 2024	B0D3LNW36K
2	October 25, 2024	B0D9JP8V2N
3	December 25, 2024	B0DK5CDX7F
4	March 25, 2025	B0DPWQ6FBX
5	June 25, 2025	B0DZNV1131
6	January 10, 2026	B0FBGK2G8R
SS	February 25, 2026	B0FTSJYXNF
7	August 25, 2026	B0GLP6CDQ9

=== Drama CD ===
The first drama CD adaptation was released on August 1, 2024. The second drama CD was released on January 10, 2026.

=== Anime ===
An anime adaptation was announced on January 7, 2026.

== Reception ==
- Next Light Novel Awards 2021 (次にくるライトノベル大賞2021) - Ranked 12th (Overall) and 7th (Web based Tankōbon)
- Next Light Novel Awards 2022 (次にくるライトノベル大賞2022) - 9th (Tankōbon)
- Kono Light Novel ga Sugoi! 2023 - 6th place (Tankōbon)
- Kono Light Novel ga Sugoi! 2024 - 1st place (Tankōbon)
- Kono Light Novel ga Sugoi! 2025 - 5th place (Tankōbon)
- Kono Light Novel ga Sugoi! 2026 - 9th place (Tankōbon)
- Da Vinci Book of the Year Award 2025 - 10th place (Novel)
- Piccoma AWARD 2025 - Absolutely interesting work (Light Novel)

By July 2026, the series has sold over 1,400,000 copies.
