= Buying a Classmate Once a Week =

Japanese light novel series

- First volume cover of the light novel

週に一度クラスメイトを買う話 ～ふたりの時間、言い訳の五千円～ (Shū ni Ichido Classmate o Kau Hanashi: Futari no Jikan, Iiwake no Go Sen-en)
- Genre: Romance, yuri
- Novel series
- Written by: Usa Haneda
- Published by: Kakuyomu
- Original run: February 4, 2020 – present
- Light novel
- Written by: Usa Haneda
- Illustrated by: U35
- Published by: Fujimi Shobo
- English publisher: NA: Yen Press
- Imprint: Fujimi Fantasia Bunko
- Original run: February 17, 2023 – present
- Volumes: 10
- Manga
- Written by: Usa Haneda
- Illustrated by: Migihara
- Published by: Akita Shoten
- Imprint: Young Champion Comics
- Magazine: Young Champion Retsu; Young Champion Web
- Original run: June 18, 2024 – present
- Volumes: 2

Buying a Classmate Once a Week (週に一度クラスメイトを買う話 ～ふたりの時間、言い訳の五千円～, Shū ni Ichido Classmate o Kau Hanashi: Futari no Jikan, Iiwake no Go Sen-en; lit. "I Buy Time with My Classmate Once a Week — Time for Two, The Excuse of 5,000 Yen.") is a Japanese light novel series written by Usa Haneda and illustrated by U35. It originally began serialization on Kadokawa's user-generated novel publishing website Kakuyomu in February 2020. It later began publication by Fujimi Shobo under their Fujimi Fantasia Bunko imprint in February 2023; ten volumes have been released as of October 2026. A manga adaptation by Migihara began serialization in Akita Shoten's Young Champion Retsu magazine and on Young Champion Web service in June 2024.

== Plot ==
The series follows Shiori Miyagi, a lonely high school student living on an allowance. She uses this allowance to pay Hazuki Sendai, her popular classmate, to meet her once a week. During these three-hour long meetups, Shiori asks Hazuki to follow her commands. One day, Shiori asks Hazuki to remove her socks and lick her feet; to her surprise, Hazuki agrees. Shiori becomes conscious about Hazuki obeying her orders, wondering how long their relationship would last.

== Characters ==
Shiori Miyagi (宮城 志緒理, Miyagi Shiyori)
Voiced by: Lynn (PV, voice drama)
A high school student who ranks low in the school hierarchy. However, she has an unusual relationship with Hazuki, renting her every week and asking her to obey her orders. Outside of this weekly interaction the two do not meet. She is conscious about relationships due to having a difficult childhood.
Hazuki Sendai (仙台 葉月, Sendai Hazuki)
Voiced by: Kana Ichinose (PV, voice drama)
A popular student who has good grades. Shiori rents her for 5,000 yen once a week. Their relationship started one day when Shiori helped her at a bookstore.

== Media ==
=== Light novels ===
Initially serialized as a web novel on Kakuyomu since February 2020, the series began publication by Fujimi Shobo under their Fujimi Fantasia Bunko imprint in February 2023 after winning a Special Award at the 7th Kakuyomu Web Novel contest. It is written by Usa Haneda and illustrated by U35. Ten volumes have been published as of October 20, 2026. Kadokawa released a promotional video for the series in June 2023, with Lynn voicing the character Shiori Miyagi and Kana Ichinose voicing the character Hazuki Sendai. A voice drama was released on Kadokawa's YouTube channel in April 2024 to promote the release of the fourth novel, with Lynn and Ichinose reprising their respective roles.

In April 2026, Yen Press announced that they had licensed the series for English publication, with the first volume set to release in October of the same year.

No.	Original release date	Original ISBN	English release date	English ISBN
1	February 17, 2023	978-4-0407-4878-8	October 13, 2026	979-8-8554-3106-3
2	June 20, 2023	978-4-0407-5028-6	January 12, 2027	979-8-8554-3108-7
3	December 20, 2023	978-4-0407-5179-5	—	—
4	April 19, 2024	978-4-0407-5380-5	—	—
5	October 19, 2024	978-4-0407-5527-4	—	—
6	February 20, 2025	978-4-0407-5773-5	—	—
7	August 20, 2025	978-4-0407-5975-3	—	—
8	December 19, 2025	978-4-0407-6170-1	—	—
9	May 20, 2026	978-4-0407-6327-9	—	—
10	October 20, 2026	978-4-0407-6552-5	—	—

=== Manga ===
A manga adaptation illustrated by Migihara began serialization in Akita Shoten's Young Champion Retsu magazine on June 18, 2024, with the series moving to the company's Young Champion Web service later in the year.

No.	Japanese release date	Japanese ISBN
1	February 27, 2025	978-4-253-31233-2
2	December 19, 2025	978-4-253-00945-4

== Reception ==
The series was included in Kimirano's Tsugirano vote in 2023, placing 8th in the paperback category. It was also included in the site's Konorano vote in 2024, placing 9th in the paperback section and 7th in the new works section.
