= List of Alya Sometimes Hides Her Feelings in Russian episodes =

Alya Sometimes Hides Her Feelings in Russian is a Japanese anime television series adaptation based on the light novel series of the same name written by SunSunSun and illustrated by Momoco. An anime adaptation, produced by Doga Kobo, was announced in March 2023. It was directed and scripts written by Ryota Itoh, character designs handled by Yūhei Murota who also serves as chief animation director, and music composition by Hiroaki Tsutsumi. Ryō Kobayashi serves as a producer. The anime series was originally scheduled for April 2024, but was later delayed, and eventually aired from July 3 to September 18, 2024, on Tokyo MX and various other networks. The first season covers 12 episodes, mainly centering around Alya's interactions with Masachika. She eventually brings Masachika involved with the Student Council and ultimately has him as her running mate for Student Council President.

The opening theme song is "Ichiban Kagayaku Hoshi" (1番輝く星; "The Brightest Star"), while each episode features a different ending theme song which are covers of pre-existing Japanese songs, all performed by Sumire Uesaka as her character Alya. Kadokawa Corporation compiled the episodes into three Blu-ray and DVD sets, which were released from September 25 to November 27, 2024.

Crunchyroll streamed the series. The first season was released on Blu-ray on July 22, 2025. Medialink licensed the series in Southeast Asia, South Asia, and Oceania (except Australia and New Zealand).

Upon the conclusion of the first-season finale, a second season was announced. Hiroshi Haraguchi will direct the season, with Yuka Yamada serving as the scriptwriter, and Yūhei Murota returning as the character designer. It was originally set to premiere in 2026; however, it was later delayed to 2027 to further improve the quality of the series.

== Series overview ==
Season	Episodes	Originally released	
Season	Episodes	First released	Last released
1	12	3 July 2024	18 September 2024
2	TBA	2027	TBA

== Episodes ==
=== Season 1 (2024) ===
No. overall	No. in season	Title	Directed by	Written by	Storyboarded by	Ending theme song (Note: Ending theme song information is taken from the ending credits of each episode)	Original release date
1	1	"Alya Hides Her Feelings in Russian"; Transliteration: "Roshiago de Dereru Ārya-san" (Japanese: ロシア語でデレるアーリャさん)	Ryota Itoh	Ryota Itoh	Ryota Itoh	"Gakuen Tengoku" (学園天国)	July 3, 2024
A Russo-Japanese teenager Alisa "Alya" Kujou is popular at school for her beauty and aloof personality. When around her classmate, Masachika Kuze, she criticizes his slacker personality. Occasionally, she will claim to insult him in Russian, unaware Masachika learnt basic Russian so he could talk to a Russian girl he knew as a child. Masachika has secretly had a crush on Alya since she started attending the same school as him, but believes he is not worthy of her and decides to push his feelings aside. However, Alya seems to have fallen in love with him and constantly flirts with him in Russian, which often leaves him flustered and perplexed, but he forces himself to just roll with it and pretend to not understand her. Alya is on the Student Council with her older sister Maria and her rival Yuki Suou. Alya is jealous of Yuki who has known Masachika since childhood and keeps trying to get him elected to the council. One morning while alone in class, Alya has to change her wet socks and dares Masachika to help her put on dry ones. Accepting her dare, he does so but accidentally puts his hand up her skirt, so she kicks him in the face, leaving Masachika with a new leg fetish. She eventually forgives him, only to learn he also saw her panties when she kicked him, so she punches him and runs away, but Masachika chases after her until she runs out of breath. Realizing she is embarrassed from him looking at her panties, Masachika apologizes for this mishap, and she accepts it, admitting it was her fault too and that she needed a moment for herself to cool off. She resumes flirting with him in Russian, much to his annoyance.
2	2	"So Much For Childhood Friends"; Transliteration: "Osananajimi to wa?" (Japanese: 幼馴染とは？)	Kōki Uchinomiya	Ryota Itoh	Ryota Itoh	"Kawaikute Gomen" (可愛くてごめん)	July 10, 2024
Yuki introduces Masachika to council president Touya Kenzaki as part of her plot to get Masachika on the council. Masachika learns Alya plans to be council president next year. At his home, it is revealed Yuki is actually Masachika's younger sister with a different family name. She has no plan on revealing this to Alya or anyone else since she enjoys teasing people. While shopping together, Yuki and Masachika realize Alya is spying on them. Yuki invites Alya to lunch with them at the spiciest ramen restaurant in the city which the siblings both enjoy, and Alya stubbornly accepts despite the ramen making her want to pass out, all while Yuki teases her suggestively about Yuki's closeness to Masachika in his bedroom. In Russian, Alya expresses a wish Masachika would support her as her vice president. Yuki leaves on an errand so Alya takes Masachika clothes shopping where she bravely tries on outfits for his approval. She ends up enjoying his compliments so much she tries on increasingly more daring outfits, hoping for more compliments, only to embarrass herself in a short skirt when Yuki unexpectedly returns. Her shock lasts for the entire train ride home, only to snap out of it when she realizes Masachika and Yuki got off at the same station, implying they live close to each other.
3	3	"And So They Met"; Transliteration: "Soshite Futari wa Deatta" (Japanese: そして二人は出会った)	Daisuke Nishimura	Ryota Itoh	Daisuke Nishimura	"Omoide ga Ippai" (想い出がいっぱい)	July 17, 2024
Alya returns home where Maria teases her about Masachika. Alya's childhood in Russia is shown where her effort in school caused conflict with her classmates who did the bare minimum to get by. Moving to Japan, she first encountered Masachika, but immediately disliked his laziness until the announcement of a school festival. Alya was surprised when Masachika took a full part in preparing for the festival and even convinced other slacker students to help. With Masachika's effort, the school approved the students staying at school all night to get the festival ready, including a bonfire and dance. With the preparations over, Alya admits she hates the nickname "Princess" everyone calls her due to the implication she was born privileged. She thanks Masachika for his hard work and allows him to use her personal nickname "Alya" instead of her full name Alisa. Maria is certain Alya and Masachika will soon be lovers. The next day, Maria arranges to go shopping with Masachika on council business and cannot help feeling she knows him from somewhere else. While shopping, Masachika is unexpectedly reminded of his parents' divorce, so Maria hugs him. Masachika cannot help feeling her hug is somehow familiar, but it ends abruptly when she accidentally spills hot tea on him.
4	4	"An Outpouring of Emotion"; Transliteration: "Afure Dasu Omoi" (Japanese: 溢れ出す想い)	Hiroshi Haraguchi	Ryota Itoh	Hiroshi Haraguchi	"Hare Hare Yukai" (ハレ晴レユカイ)	July 24, 2024
Masachika tells Touya he is unworthy of joining the council since he joined the council in middle school for a selfish reason. Touya claims it does not matter since he himself only became council president to impress Chisaki. Masachika decides to consider joining, but only to help Alya become president. Alya is sent to mediate a dispute between the soccer and baseball clubs, which does not go well due to her inexperience and she starts to doubt she could ever be a good president, even regrets the way she treated everybody with her need to become perfect. Masachika, having heard her crying in Russian, steps in and tricks the club managers who happen to be dating into settling the dispute themselves. Alya is impressed. Despite knowing Touya manipulated him, Masachika agrees to join the council and to help Alya become president. Falling even deeper in love, Alya tells him she likes him without using Russian. Something about her confession reminds him of the Russian girl from his childhood, ruining the moment, so she slaps him for thinking about another woman. She immediately forgives him and even kisses the cheek she slapped, but when she leaves without saying anything in Russian, Masachika is left unsure about what any of their conversation really meant. Alya is likewise unsure why she told him she likes him. Maria states that it's because she is in love with Masachika, which she stubbornly denies. Maria openly advises her to confess to him before another girl gets to him first, hinting at a possible love triangle, but Alya remains oblivious to what she means.
5	5	"Different People, Common Undercurrent"; Transliteration: "Sorezore no Ketsui" (Japanese: それぞれの決意)	Sung Min Kim	Misuzu Chiba	Sung Min Kim	"Chiisana Koi no Uta" (小さな恋のうた)	July 31, 2024
Masachika wrestles with the idea Alya might really like him, but concludes it must have been a plot to get him on the council, pushing aside his own feelings for her. Returning home, he walks in on Yuki naked, but rather than get in trouble, Yuki explains she planned the whole thing as a bizarre apology for forcing him onto the council. Yuki is disappointed Masachika plans to help Alya become president and, believing he did it because Alya has large breasts, declares they are rivals both for Masachika's love and for the presidency. Secretly, she is glad Masachika has his motivation back. Alya notices changes to Masachika's behavior and wonders if it is because he is serious about his support for. Ever since her semi-confession, Masachika has begun noticing more of Alya's "subtle-sexiness" moments, making him crush on her even more. This is made worse when she starts showing open concern for him, until she learns his odd behavior was mostly caused by skipping breakfast that morning. Alya returns to treating him coldly, which Masachika approves. They attend their first council meeting where Maria notices Masachika and Alya do seem to be closer than before. Masachika is made the councils General Affairs Officer, but openly admits his main focus will be making Alya the next president.
6	6	"A Kiss of the Indirect Variety"; Transliteration: "Iwayuru Hitotsu no Kansetsu Kisu" (Japanese: いわゆるひとつの間接キス)	Mitsuhiro Osako	Yuka Yamada	Hiroaki Yoshikawa	"Himitsu no Kotoba" (秘密の言葉)	August 7, 2024
Yuki and Alya are paired up for council work where Yuki tells Alya she loves Masachika and pressures Alya to embrace her own love for him. Alya cannot bring herself to accept her feelings, but still declares she will not let Yuki steal Masachika away from her, much to Yuki's amusement. They return to the council where Alya sits much closer to Masachika, which embarrasses him. Maria jokes about marriage and Masachika notices that while Alya denies it in Russian, it is only because she thinks she is too young, which hurts him slightly. Masachika notices tension between Alya and Yuki, and believes them to be fighting over him. While at a café working on her campaign to be president, Masachika reassures Alya that Yuki enjoys teasing people. He also warns her about General Meetings where council members are expected to solve serious issues through debate. Yuki is already popular but if Alya beats her in a General Meeting, it will improve her odds of winning. Alya cannot focus and instead pressures him into an indirect kiss by insisting he try her ice cream using her spoon. This embarrasses them both in front of the whole café, but nevertheless Masachika manages to advice her to somehow get the voters sympathy like President Touya who, during his own campaign, lost weight and improved his grades. Masachika solves the spoon issue by ordering food for himself with separate utensils. Alya stubbornly tries it, despite his meal containing chillies, and him warning her beforehand, and spends the rest of the evening in pain. The next day, Yuki introduces her potential vice-president, Ayano Kimishima, which worries Masachika and amuses Yuki.
7	7	"A Storm Arrives"; Transliteration: "Arashi, Kitaru" (Japanese: 嵐、来たる)	Takafumi Fujii	Misuzu Chiba	Hiroaki Yoshikawa	"Love Story wa Totsuzen ni" (ラブ・ストーリーは突然に)	August 14, 2024
Ayano works for the Suou family and informs Masachika that helping Alya compete against Yuki has angered Masachika and Yuki's grandfather, who exiled Masachika and his father years ago. Not caring about his maternal grandfather's opinion, Masachika repeats his support for Alya. Later, Masachika accidentally angers Alya, who believes he prefers her beauty over her personality. Yuki is glad Masachika still loves her like a sister. Ayano suggests she too is drawn to Masachika, but purely for sexual reasons as she despises his slacker personality. Yuki looks forward to facing Masachika in competition as he is secretly the greatest prodigy of the Suou family. During a council party, Masachika quickly notices Ayano's new interest in him. Maria is happy Alya has someone she can trust since as her sister her own support for Alya has to be more subtle. Masachika reveals to her his slacker personality is just an act to hide what he is capable of. Sayaka of the Public Morals Committee, another presidential candidate, accuses Alya of conspiring to steal Masachika from Yuki for the competition, most likely by blackmail or other immoral means. When Masachika denies this, Sayaka challenges them both to a General Meeting to force them out of the competition.
8	8	"Student Congress"; Transliteration: "Gakusei Gikai" (Japanese: 学生議会)	Daisuke Nishimura & Shohei Fujita	Misuzu Chiba	Ryota Itoh	"Cherry"	August 21, 2024
Masachika admits Sayaka likely hates him for supporting Yuki against her for president in middle school. They learn Sayaka's teammate Nonoa has useful connections. Sayaka begins by claiming presidents typically select friends to join the council; therefore teacher screenings would ensure only appropriate students join. Alya counters by claiming this would give teachers inappropriate power over the council, which impresses the audience. However, in support of her best friend, Nonoa uses friends among the audience to whisper against Alya for being foreign, upsetting her. Masachika takes over and points out students voted for President Touya, who due to his poor past grades never would have made it through a teachers screening. Unable to respond, Sayaka flees in tears. Alya follows and Sayaka admits she accepted losing to Yuki in middle school because Yuki and Masachika were a perfect team, but seeing Masachika with Alya makes her loss unbearable and refuses to accept Alya as his partner. Alya admits she does not know why Masachika supports her, but hopes to be worthy of it and for Sayaka to see her in a better light. Yuki is disappointed Masachika let the debate last so long when he could have won at any time, but is still impressed to know her brother is skilled. Masachika admits to Alya he partnered with Yuki due to guilt, but supports Alya because he wants to, and genuinely likes spending time with her. Alya is happy to have his support and reveals in Russian that she chose Masachika because of who he is and how nice he is to her. However, she is still angry at Masachika's earlier comment about her breast size, which embarrasses him.
9	9	"Rom-commy with a Chance of Hypnosis"; Transliteration: "Rabukome nochi Saiminjutsu" (Japanese: ラブコメのち催眠術)	Yukiko Tsukahara, Aya Ikeda & Shinichi Fukumoto	Misuzu Chiba	Moe Suzuki & Ryota Itoh	"World Is Mine" (ワールドイズマイン)	August 28, 2024
Yuki's grandfather warns her she must become president as he will not tolerate her losing to Masachika since he left the family. Alya feels guilty Sayaka was humiliated and people talking bad about her so Masachika agrees to help her clear her name. Alya is touched, but Masachika panics when it looks like a romantic atmosphere is developing and quickly points out Touya and Chisaki hiding nearby, their own romantic moment having been interrupted by Alya and Masachika. Masachika asks Nonoa to spread a rumour justifying Sayaka running off stage without it looking like she ran away. Unconcerned with her own reputation, Nonoa spreads the story Sayaka left because she was mad at her for planting her friends in the audience to distract Alya. While studying with Masachika, Alya is annoyed they are disturbed by Yuki, Ayano and Maria, but is unable to do anything about it. Maria finds a book on hypnosis. Alya is skeptical and insists Masachika try hypnotizing her to prove it is nonsense. Unsurprisingly, both Alya and Maria end up hypnotized. Yuki takes advantage and orders them to abandon their inhibitions. Both girls start removing their clothes and cannot be stopped even using the book. Fortunately, Chisaki appears and wakes them up, having read more of the book than Masachika. As both girls panic at waking up half-naked, Chisaki attempts to punish Masachika for looking at their half-dressed state.
10	10	"Birthday Party, Much Belated"; Transliteration: "Okurebasenagara, Tanjōkai" (Japanese: 遅ればせながら、誕生会)	Sung Min Kim	Yuka Yamada	Sung Min Kim	"Koi no Uta" (こいのうた)	September 4, 2024
As exams are soon done, Alya bets Masachika if he makes it to within the top 30, she will do any one thing he asks. Masachika happens to mention it was his birthday three months previously and Alya is disappointed he did not invite her. After exams are over, Masachika explains that birthdays are not celebrated in his family. As she seems upset by this, he impulsively offers to throw a party just for the two of them. During the party, they discuss the closing ceremony where presidential candidates give speeches, and the audience reaction is usually a good indicator of the likely winner. Yuki is already incredibly popular so Masachika advises Alya to aim just high enough to be considered a viable opponent. Masachika notices not only does she compliment him without using Russian, she even accepts an indirect kiss via a fork without any reaction. She also gifts him a teacup and subtly hints she kept a matching cup for herself. Touya announces he is hoping to get the school to update the uniforms. Maria gets revenge on Masachika for the hypnosis incident. Masachika's paternal grandfather accompanies him to parent-teacher conference and encounters Alya and her mother. Masachika's grandfather and Alya's mother immediately take a liking to Alya and Masachika, embarrassing both of them. Masachika is deeply upset to also encounter Yuki with their mother Yumi. Before he could say anything, his paternal grandfather manages to ease the tension by initiating a conversation with Yumi.
11	11	"An Unexpected Curtain-Raiser"; Transliteration: "Yoki Senu Zenshō-sen" (Japanese: 予期せぬ前哨戦)	Mitsuhiro Osako	Misuzu Chiba	Hiroaki Yoshikawa & Mitsuhiro Osako	"Kimagure Romantic" (気まぐれロマンティック)	September 11, 2024
Masachika has a nightmare of being unable to impress his mother. He also finds the stress has given him a cold. He is exasperated when Yuki sends Alya to his apartment to nurse him, but still enjoys having her take care of him. Masachika falls asleep until late and awakens to Alya competing with Ayano to nurse him overnight. In the end, Alya has to leave as she has an event the next morning. Masachika does not awaken until the following afternoon and realizes Yuki deliberately gave Alya cold medicine for him that causes drowsiness, while also sending Ayano in a maid disguise to make sure the medicine works on him. Realizing Yuki schemed to keep him off school longer, he rushes to school and finds during his absence, Yuki pressured Alya into doing a radio broadcast but right before the broadcast, she told Alya about her genius older brother, and implies he died. Unsettled by this, Alya performed terribly during the broadcast, and is left devastated. Masachika cheers her up and points out Yuki's goal was to get in Alya's head and depress her before the closing ceremony speeches. As Masachika starts to scheme against Yuki himself, Alya notices him smiling like an evil mastermind over his sister's underhanded trick and thinks it makes him look attractive, but does not put two and two together that he is Yuki's brother. Sayaka and Nonoa interrupt to properly apologize for the General Meeting and announce Sayaka is quitting the contest to become president. Masachika asks her not to announce it publicly yet as he just thought of a way Alya can defeat Yuki during closing ceremony with Sayaka's help.
12	12	"Chin Up and Face Forward"; Transliteration: "Mae o Muite" (Japanese: 前を向いて)	Ryota Itoh	Ryota Itoh	Ryota Itoh	"Hanamoyoi" (ハナモヨイ)	September 18, 2024
Masachika tells Alya a trick to engage the audience. In her speech, Yuki shares her plan to resurrect the student suggestion box and references her past experience as president in middle school. Masachika admits it was a good speech despite containing only empty promises. Ayano gives a speech on becoming Yuki's vice-president in which she praises Yuki shamelessly. Alya confuses the audience by starting her speech in Russian, and then amuses them by claiming she did it accidentally due to being nervous. This has the effect Masachika wanted of calming the audience down after Yuki's speech, refocusing them as Alya genuinely impresses them on stage. Alya admits to her lack of experience, but promises to work harder than everyone to gain that experience. In his speech, Masachika deliberately makes a fool of himself to make the audience laugh, but also explains that he chose Alya for her charisma and earnest nature. He also reveals if Alya becomes president, her former opponents, Sayaka and Nonoa, will join the council as her subordinates, leaving everyone, including Yuki and Ayano, surprised. Albeit frustrated, Yuki admits defeat with a smile on her face, but promises to beat Alya and Masachika the next year. Later that day, Masachika points out he did not make it into the top 30 exam results, and Alya has no idea what to ask as a forfeit as she never thought he would lose. Remembering something she said earlier in Russian, Masachika suggests they should start calling each other by their first names. Alya agrees, but both of them are left flustered as their feelings for each other grow stronger. As they leave the school, Masachika shyly suggests that he and Alya should spend the summer together, preparing for the actual student election the following year, as Yuki and Ayano will be doing the same, to which Alya happily accepts.

== Home media release ==
=== Japanese ===
Kadokawa Corporation (Japan – Region 2/A)
Vol.	Episodes	Cover character(s)	Release date	Ref.
1	1–4	Alisa "Alya" Mikhailovna Kujou	September 25, 2024	
2	5–8	Yuki Suou	October 25, 2024	
3	9–12	Maria "Masha" Mikhailovna Kujou	November 27, 2024	

=== English ===
Crunchyroll, LLC (North America – Region 1/A)
Vol.	Discs	Episodes	Standard edition release date	Limited edition release date	Ref.
Season 1	2	1–12	July 22, 2025		
