= Saho Tenamachi =

Japanese manga artist

- 手名町紗帆
- Born: November 25; Wakayama Prefecture, Japan
- Occupation: Manga artist
- Known for: Alya Sometimes Hides Her Feelings in Russian

Saho Tenamachi (手名町紗帆, Tenamachi Saho; born Nov 25) is a Japanese manga artist from Wakayama Prefecture. She graduated from the Comic Art Course in the Faculty of Manga at Kyoto Seika University.

== Biography ==
Tenamachi received an honorable mention in the 32nd Grand Challenge with her piece Yotaka to Rokutōsei (夜鷹と六等星; The Nightjar and the Sixth Magnitude Star). In 2019, she made her professional debut with her comic adaptation Shōsetsu no Kamisama (小説の神様; God of Novels) serialized in Shōnen Magazine R. Her comic adaptation of Alya Sometimes Hides Her Feelings in Russian began a serialized run in Magazine Pocket on October 29, 2022.

== Personal life ==
For her profile images, Tenamachi uses pictures of a character she drew in high school called Tena Usagi (てなうさぎ; Tena Rabbit). The Saku Nozawa branch of Tsutaya Bookstore also displays a 3D version of the character.

== Works list ==
=== Manga ===
==== Serials ====
- Shōsetsu no Kamisama (小説の神様; God of Novels). Original story by Saho Aizawa. Serialized in Shonen Magazine R 2019 Issue 6 - 2020 Issue 10 (3 volumes total).
- Itsuka, Nemuri ni Tsuku Hi (いつか、眠りにつく日; Someday, I Will Fall Asleep). Original story by Inujun. Character design by Momoco. Serialized in *Monthly ComicREX* April 2021 Issue - September 2022 Issue (2 volumes total).
- Alya Sometimes Hides Her Feelings in Russian. Original story by SunSunSun. Serialized in Kadokawa Beans Bunko since October 29, 2022 (currently 7 volumes).

==== One-shots ====
- Jitsuroku! Corona de Utsu + Enkei Datsumō-shō ni Natta Mangaka ga Dysonn no Sōjiki wo Kau Hanashi!! (実録！コロナで鬱＋円形脱毛症になった漫画家がダイソンの掃除機を買う話!!; The True Story of a Manga Artist who Developed Depression and Alopecia Areata after Catching COVID and Bought a Dyson Vacuum!!). Published in *MANGA Day to Day* Volume 2, 2021 - Relay serialization.

=== Illustrations ===
==== Light Novels ====
- Urareta Reijō wa Hōkōsaki de Tokeru hodo Dekiai Sarete Imasu (売られた令嬢は奉公先で溶けるほど溺愛されています). Written by Hozakura Hisaki. Published by KADOKAWA (Kadokawa Beans Bunko). Published March 2022 ISBN 978-4-04-112429-1
