= Jujutsu Kaisen season 2 (soundtrack) =

2023 anime soundtrack album by Yoshimasa Terui

There were a total of two soundtrack albums released for season 2 of the TV anime series Jujutsu Kaisen. Both composed by Yoshimasa Terui, with some tracks by the previous season and film soundtrack composers, Hiroaki Tsutsumi and Alisa Okehazama.

The "Shibuya Incident" soundtrack contains all tracks of the "Hidden Inventory / Premature" soundtrack, along with some new tracks and a new disc.

== Hidden Inventory / Premature Death ==
Jujutsu Kaisen Hidden Inventory / Premature Death Original Soundtrack

Soundtrack album by Yoshimasa Terui
- Released: August 6, 2023
- Length: 57:14
- Label: Toho Animation

Jujutsu Kaisen soundtrack albums chronology
Jujutsu Kaisen 0 (Original Motion Picture Soundtrack) (2021)	Jujutsu Kaisen Hidden Inventory / Premature Death Original Soundtrack (2023)	Jujutsu Kaisen Hidden Inventory / Premature Death & Shibuya Incident Original Soundtrack (2024)

Jujutsu Kaisen Hidden Inventory / Premature Death Original Soundtrack (「呪術廻戦 懐玉・玉折」オリジナル・サウンドトラック, 「Jujutsu Kaisen Kaigyoku・Gyokusetsu」Orijinaru・Saundotorakku) is the soundtrack for the Hidden Inventory/Premature Death arc of the 2023 TV anime series Jujutsu Kaisen season 2. It was composed by Yoshimasa Terui, and released on August 6, 2023, by Toho Animation Records.

=== Track listing ===
Jujutsu Kaisen Hidden Inventory / Premature Death Original Soundtrack track listing
No.	Title	Lyrics	Music	Artist	Length
1.	"Hidden Inventory (懐玉, Kaigyoku)"		Yoshimasa Terui	Terui	1:29
2.	"Our Mission"		Terui	Terui	2:15
3.	"The Search for the Cursed Spirit (呪霊の探索, Jurei no Tansaku)"		Terui	Terui	2:23
4.	"A Little Lesson"		Terui	Terui	2:06
5.	"Tōji Fushiguro (伏黒甚爾, Fushiguro Tōji)"		Terui	Terui	2:32
6.	"Elegant Time"		Terui	Terui	2:08
7.	"You Jerk"		Terui	Terui	1:56
8.	"Searching for Riko (理子の捜索, Riko no Sōsaku)"		Terui	Terui	1:41
9.	"Attack By Storm"		Terui	Terui	1:43
10.	"Beautiful Dreamer"	Stephen C. Foster	Foster	Terui, Chorus	2:02
11.	"Limitless Cursed Technique (無下限呪術, Mukagen Jujutsu)"		Terui	Terui	2:19
12.	"Prepare Yourself"		Terui	Terui	2:31
13.	"Tida Sansan（Dazzling Sun） (太陽燦々（てぃださんさん）, Taiyō Sansan（Tida Sansan）)"	Mion	Terui	Terui, Mion	2:27
14.	"Trip Itinerary"		Terui	Terui	2:51
15.	"If I Am With You (一緒なら, Issho Nara)"		Terui	Terui	2:26
16.	"No Hesitation"		Terui	Terui	2:59
17.	"Our Fellow Sorcerers' Corpses (仲間（じゅつし）の屍, Nakama（Jutsushi）no Shikabane)"		Terui	Terui	2:06
18.	"Physical Prowess (フィジカルギフテッド, Fijikaru Gifuteddo)"		Terui	Terui	2:15
19.	"With Rage"		Terui	Terui	2:21
20.	"Little Hand"		Terui	Terui	1:56
21.	"Delirious"		Terui	Terui	2:30
22.	"Decision"		Terui	Terui	2:36
23.	"The Taste of a Cursed Spirit (呪霊の味, Jurei no Aji)"		Terui	Terui	1:43
24.	"Arrogance"		Terui	Terui	2:21
25.	"Premature (玉折, Gyokusetsu)"		Terui	Terui	1:22
26.	"You Better Get Strong (強くなってよ, Tsuyoku Natte Yo)"		Terui	Terui	2:16
Total length:					57:14

== Hidden Inventory / Premature Death & Shibuya Incident ==
Jujutsu Kaisen Hidden Inventory / Premature Death & Shibuya Incident Original Soundtrack

Soundtrack album by Yoshimasa Terui
- Released: January 24, 2024
- Length: 141:58
- Label: Toho Animation

Jujutsu Kaisen soundtrack albums chronology
Jujutsu Kaisen Hidden Inventory / Premature Death Original Soundtrack (2023)	Jujutsu Kaisen Hidden Inventory / Premature Death & Shibuya Incident Original Soundtrack (2024)

Jujutsu Kaisen Hidden Inventory / Premature Death & Shibuya Incident Original Soundtrack (「呪術廻戦 懐玉・玉折 / 渋谷事変」オリジナル・サウンドトラック, 「Jujutsu Kaisen Kaigyoku・Gyokusetsu / Shibuya Jihen」Orijinaru・Saundotorakku) is the soundtrack for the Shibuya Incident arc of 2023 TV anime series Jujutsu Kaisen's season 2. It was released on January 24, 2024, by Toho Animation Records.

=== Track listing ===
Disc 1
No.	Title	Lyrics	Music	Artist	Length
1.	"Hidden Inventory (懐玉, Kaigyoku)"		Yoshimasa Terui	Terui	1:29
2.	"Our Mission"		Terui	Terui	2:15
3.	"The Search for the Cursed Spirit (呪霊の探索, Jurei no Tansaku)"		Terui	Terui	2:23
4.	"A Little Lesson"		Terui	Terui	2:06
5.	"Tōji Fushiguro (伏黒甚爾, Fushiguro Tōji)"		Terui	Terui	2:32
6.	"Elegant Time"		Terui	Terui	2:08
7.	"You Jerk"		Terui	Terui	1:56
8.	"Searching for Riko (理子の捜索, Riko no Sōsaku)"		Terui	Terui	1:41
9.	"Attack By Storm"		Terui	Terui	1:43
10.	"Beautiful Dreamer"	Stephen C. Foster	Foster	Terui, Chorus	2:02
11.	"Limitless Cursed Technique (無下限呪術, Mukagen Jujutsu)"		Terui	Terui	2:19
12.	"Prepare Yourself"		Terui	Terui	2:31
13.	"Tida Sansan（Dazzling Sun） (太陽燦々（てぃださんさん）, Taiyō Sansan（Tida Sansan）)"	Mion	Terui	Terui, Mion	2:27
14.	"Trip Itinerary"		Terui	Terui	2:51
15.	"If I Am With You (一緒なら, Issho Nara)"		Terui	Terui	2:26
16.	"No Hesitation"		Terui	Terui	2:59
17.	"Our Fellow Sorcerers' Corpses (仲間（じゅつし）の屍, Nakama（Jutsushi）no Shikabane)"		Terui	Terui	2:06
18.	"Physical Prowess (フィジカルギフテッド, Fijikaru Gifuteddo)"		Terui	Terui	2:15
19.	"With Rage"		Terui	Terui	2:21
20.	"Little Hand"		Terui	Terui	1:56
21.	"Delirious"		Terui	Terui	2:30
22.	"Decision"		Terui	Terui	2:36
23.	"The Taste of a Cursed Spirit (呪霊の味, Jurei no Aji)"		Terui	Terui	1:43
24.	"Arrogance"		Terui	Terui	2:21
25.	"Premature (玉折, Gyokusetsu)"		Terui	Terui	1:22
26.	"You Better Get Strong (強くなってよ, Tsuyoku Natte Yo)"		Terui	Terui	2:16
27.	"Someone Behind the Scenes (裡にいる何者か, Uchi ni Iru Nanimonoka)"		Terui	Terui	2:11
28.	"Evening Festival (宵祭り, Yoimatsuri)"		Terui	Terui	2:16
29.	"Ultimate Mechamaru Mode: Absolute (究極メカ丸絶対形態（モード・アブソリュート）, Kyūkyoku Mekamaru Zettai Keitai（Mōdo Abusoryuto）)"		Terui	Terui	1:58
Total length:					63:39

Disc 2
No.	Title	Lyrics	Music	Artist	Length
1.	"Jujutsu Sorcerer"		Terui	Terui	3:33
2.	"Shibuya Incident (渋谷事変, Shibuya Jihen)"		Terui	Terui	1:37
3.	"Bad Situation"		Terui	Terui	2:04
4.	"Domain Expansion (領域展開, Ryōiki Tenkai)"		Terui	Terui	1:59
5.	"Locust Plague (蝗害, Kōgai)"		Terui	Terui	1:59
6.	"Doom (凶運, Kyōun)"		Terui	Terui	2:44
7.	"Three Years of Youth Overflowing (溢れ出す3年間の青い春, Afuredasu San-nenkan no Aoi Haru)"		Terui	Terui	2:28
8.	"Pandemonium (昏乱, Konran)"		Terui	Terui	1:40
9.	"Expectation"		Terui	Terui	2:00
10.	"Recapture"		Terui	Terui	2:17
11.	"Equilibrium"		Terui	Terui	2:36
12.	"Fight Alongside (共闘, Kyōtō)"		Terui	Terui	1:54
13.	"Dull Knife (鈍刀, Dontō)"		Terui	Terui	3:11
14.	"Special Grade Disease Cursed Spirit "Smallpox Deity" (特級特定疾病呪霊「疱瘡神」, Tokkyū Tokutei Shippei Jurei「Hōsōgami」)"		Terui	Terui	1:58
15.	"Red Scale (赫鱗, Rinkakuku)"		Terui	Terui	2:28
16.	"Resolve"		Terui, Hiroaki Tsutsumi	Terui, Tsutsumi	3:52
17.	"Memories (記憶, Kioku)"		Terui	Terui	2:40
18.	"Fluctuations (揺蕩, Yōtō)"		Terui	Terui	1:39
19.	"Awaken (目覚め, Mezame)"		Terui	Terui	2:34
20.	"Still Unaware (未だ知らず, Mada Shirazu)"		Terui	Terui	1:40
21.	"Thunderclap (霹靂, Hekireki)"		Terui	Terui	3:37
22.	"Eight-Handled Sword Divergent Sila Divine General Makora (八握剣異戒神将魔虚羅, Hachi-nigi Ken I Kai Jinshō Makora)"		Terui	Terui	1:40
23.	"Malevolent Shrine (伏魔御廚子, Fukuma Mizushi)"		Terui	Terui	5:18
24.	"Vague Reason (曖昧な理由, Aimai na Riyū)"		Terui	Terui	3:32
25.	"Jujutsu Sorcerer・Nobara Kugisaki (呪術師・釘崎野薔薇, Jujutsushi・Kugisaki Nobara)"		Terui, Alisa Okehazama	Terui, Okehazama	2:43
26.	"Life wasn't so bad (悪くなかった, Warukunakatta)"		Terui	Terui	2:32
27.	"Entrusted (託されたもの, Takusareta Mono)"		Terui	Terui	3:40
28.	"Climax☆Jumping! (最高潮☆JUMPING!, Saikōchō☆JUMPING!)"	Genki Mizuno from (K)now Name	Terui, Tsutsumi	Terui, Takada-chan（CV：Tomoyo Kurosawa）	3:44
29.	"Transformation（Metamorphosis） (変身, Henshin)"		Terui, Okehazama	Terui, Okehazama	3:00
30.	"Detestable Person (憎むべき者, Nikumu Beki-Mono)"		Terui	Terui	1:19
Total length:					141:58
