= Jujutsu Kaisen 0 (soundtrack) =

Jujutsu Kaisen 0 (Original Motion Picture Soundtrack)

Soundtrack album by Hiroaki Tsutsumi, Yoshimasa Terui, and Alisa Okehazama
- Released: December 22, 2021
- Length: 78:23
- Label: Toho Animation
- Director: Yoshiki Kobayashi
- Producer: Yoshiki Kobayashi

Jujutsu Kaisen soundtrack albums chronology
| Jujutsu Kaisen Original Soundtrack (2021) | Jujutsu Kaisen 0 (Original Motion Picture Soundtrack) (2021) | Jujutsu Kaisen Hidden Inventory / Premature Death Original Soundtrack (2023) |

Jujutsu Kaisen 0 (Original Motion Picture Soundtrack) (『劇場版 呪術廻戦 0』オリジナル・サウンドトラック, 『Gekijōban Jujutsu Kaisen 0』Orijinaru・Saundotorakku) is the soundtrack for the 2021 anime film Jujutsu Kaisen 0. It was composed by Hiroaki Tsutsumi, Yoshimasa Terui, and Alisa Okehazama, and released on December 22, 2021, by Toho Animation Records.

== Track listing ==
Jujutsu Kaisen 0 (Original Motion Picture Soundtrack) track listing
| No. | Title | Lyrics | Music | Artist | Length |
|---|---|---|---|---|---|
| 1. | "The Cursed Child" | | Alisa Okehazama | Okehazama | 2:07 |
| 2. | "Greatest Strength" | Chica | Hiroaki Tsutsumi | Tsutsumi, Toft Willingham, Chez, Jessica Gelinas | 3:12 |
| 3. | "Transfer Student" | | Okehazama | Okehazama | 1:00 |
| 4. | "Record" | | Yoshimasa Terui | Terui | 1:01 |
| 5. | "It's a Promise" | | Terui | Terui | 0:46 |
| 6. | "Team Up If They Are Weak" | | Tsutsumi | Tsutsumi | 2:07 |
| 7. | "What'd You Expect?" | | Terui | Terui | 4:00 |
| 8. | "Special Grade Vengeful Cursed Spirit: Rika" | | Tsutsumi | Tsutsumi, Gelinas | 1:57 |
| 9. | "Together Forever and Ever" | | Tsutsumi | Tsutsumi | 2:16 |
| 10. | "From Unknown" | | Okehazama | Okehazama | 1:46 |
| 11. | "Practice" | | Terui | Terui | 3:30 |
| 12. | "Things Are Lookn' Good" | | Terui | Terui | 1:00 |
| 13. | "A Mission" | | Terui | Terui | 1:35 |
| 14. | "Cursed Speech" | | Tsutsumi | Tsutsumi | 0:46 |
| 15. | "Toge and Okkotsu" | | Tsutsumi | Tsutsumi | 4:57 |
| 16. | "In Similar Circumstances" | | Tsutsumi | Tsutsumi | 1:54 |
| 17. | "Geto's Residuals" | | Tsutsumi | Tsutsumi | 1:30 |
| 18. | "Geto's True Identity" | | Terui | Terui | 3:09 |
| 19. | "Contact" | | Terui | Terui | 2:23 |
| 20. | "Declare War" | | Okehazama | Okehazama | 1:44 |
| 21. | "Hesitate" | | Okehazama | Okehazama | 2:32 |
| 22. | "The Night Parade of a Hundred Demons" | | Tsutsumi | Tsutsumi | 1:26 |
| 23. | "About Maki" | | Tsutsumi | Tsutsumi | 1:46 |
| 24. | "A Feeling of Strangeness" | | Okehazama | Okehazama | 2:46 |
| 25. | "Fisticuffs" | | Tsutsumi | Tsutsumi | 1:52 |
| 26. | "To Fight the Curse" | | Okehazama | Okehazama | 6:46 |
| 27. | "Gojo VS Miguel" | | Tsutsumi | Tsutsumi | 2:51 |
| 28. | "The Real You" | Chica | Tsutsumi | Tsutsumi, Willingham | 4:50 |
| 29. | "We Are Stop the Attack" | | Terui | Terui | 2:06 |
| 30. | "This Is Pure Love" | | Okehazama | Okehazama, Gelinas | 5:20 |
| 31. | "Peace Out" | | Tsutsumi | Tsutsumi | 3:28 |
| Total length: | | | | | 78:23 |
