= My Senpai Is Annoying =

Japanese manga series and its adaptation(s)

- First tankōbon volume cover, featuring Harumi Takeda (left) and Futaba Igarashi (right)

先輩がうざい後輩の話 (Senpai ga Uzai Kōhai no Hanashi)
- Genre: Romantic comedy Slice of life
- Manga
- Written by: Shiro Manta
- Published by: Ichijinsha
- English publisher: NA: Seven Seas Entertainment
- Magazine: Comic Pool
- Original run: September 17, 2017 – July 26, 2024
- Volumes: 13
- Anime television series
- Directed by: Ryota Itoh
- Produced by: Takashi Jinguuji; Hajime Kamata; Fumihiro Ozawa; Renta Suzuki; Fumi Miura; Taiki Kakizaki
- Written by: Yoshimi Narita
- Music by: Hiroaki Tsutsumi
- Studio: Doga Kobo
- Licensed by: Crunchyroll (Note: In North America through Crunchyroll, LLC (formerly known as Funimation).); SA/SEA: Muse Communication
- Original network: Tokyo MX, BS11, GYT, HTB, Animax, TUF
- English network: SEA: Animax Asia
- Original run: October 10, 2021 – December 26, 2021
- Episodes: 12
- icon

My Senpai Is Annoying (Japanese: 先輩がうざい後輩の話, Hepburn: Senpai ga Uzai Kōhai no Hanashi; transl. 'Story of a Kōhai Annoyed by Her Senpai') is a Japanese romantic comedy manga series written and illustrated by Shiro Manta. The series was first posted on Twitter and Pixiv in September 2017 before it ended in July 2024. It also began serialization via Ichijinsha's Comic Pool digital manga magazine in July 2018. Its chapters have been collected in thirteen tankōbon volumes. The manga is licensed in North America by Seven Seas Entertainment. An anime television series adaptation produced by Doga Kobo aired from October to December 2021.

== Plot ==
Futaba Igarashi, a diminutive and scrappy office worker who is often mistaken for a child, constantly complains about her big and boisterous coworker, Harumi Takeda. However, it is clear to Futaba's friends and coworkers she secretly harbors feelings for Takeda that she is struggling with.

== Characters ==
Futaba Igarashi (五十嵐双葉, Igarashi Futaba)
Voiced by: Haruka Shiraishi (manga PV), Tomori Kusunoki (anime) (Japanese); Risa Mei (English)
Igarashi is a diminutive young woman with green hair and eyes. Due to her height, she is often mistaken for a child. She is constantly annoyed by her office senpai, Harumi Takeda, who is big, loud, and boisterous. Despite this, however, Igarashi harbors romantic feelings for Takeda, which she struggles to deal with despite it being obvious to everyone else.
Harumi Takeda (武田晴海, Takeda Harumi)
Voiced by: Takaya Kuroda (manga PV), Shunsuke Takeuchi (anime) (Japanese); Patrick Seitz (English)
Takeda is a boisterous office worker of great height. In the office, he is in charge of Igarashi and will go out of his way to help her and their other colleagues. His favorite hobby is teasing Igarashi by tousling her hair. While he has stated in the past he likes Igarashi, it is unclear if he harbors any romantic feelings for her. Despite this, he spends most of his time both in and out of the office with Igarashi.
Touko Sakurai (桜井桃子, Sakurai Tōko)
Voiced by: Atsumi Tanezaki (manga PV), Saori Hayami (anime) (Japanese); Jennifer AuBuchon (English)
Sakurai is the most attractive woman in the office, and the object of affection for most of her male coworkers. Though gentle and polite, she does not return any of their advances, largely taking a romantic interest in Kazama because of his perceived lack thereof.
Souta Kazama (風間蒼太, Kazama Sōta)
Voiced by: Taku Yashiro (manga PV), Reiō Tsuchida (anime) (Japanese); Mark Allen Jr. (English)
Kazama is a fellow coworker and a good friend of Takeda's. Though he is perpetually stoic, he is also somewhat of a hikikomori with a fondness for video games and women. A running gag features Kazama nonchalantly filming things around the office, particularly embarrassing moments for Igarashi, making him the primary target of her wrath. He has feelings for Sakurai, and may be the only person in the office genuinely interested in her, despite often ogling her breasts.
Natsumi Kurobe (黒部夏美, Kurobe Natsumi)
Voiced by: Saori Ōnishi (manga PV), Reina Aoyama (anime) (Japanese); Erica Schroeder (English)
Kurobe is an athletic woman who is Igarashi's best friend. They have been friends since junior high, meeting on Igarashi's first day at her Tokyo school.
Yuto Sakurai (桜井優人, Sakurai Yūto)
Voiced by: Yui Horie (Japanese); Bryn Apprill (English)
Yuto is Touko's timid younger brother.
Mona Tsukishiro (月城モナ, Tsukishiro Mona)
Voiced by: Aoi Koga (Japanese); Madeleine Morris (English)
Tsukishiro is a coworker of Igarashi's who has a Russian background. This is evident by her Russian expressions, her references to Siberia, and her love of vodka. She has a tendency to randomly appear next to people when they least expect it.
Futaba's grandfather (おじいちゃん, Ojī-chan)
Voiced by: Akio Ōtsuka (Japanese); R. Bruce Elliott (English)
Igarashi's grandfather who raised her until she was 13, after which she moved to Tokyo. Though he supports her desire for independence, he is overprotective of his granddaughter and often goes to great lengths to make sure she is okay, including being adamant against her dating. Though they butt heads, he and Takeda have a lot in common, sharing the same hobbies and physical prowess. He rides a motorcycle.
Department Chief (部長, Buchō)
Voiced by: Yutaka Aoyama (Japanese); Kenny James (English)
He is the department chief who is kind and supportive.
Ooishi (大石, Ōishi)
Voiced by: Yūta Odagaki (Japanese); Austin Sisk (English)
Ooishi is one of Kazama's two best work friends. He tends to be timid and self-deprecating.
Hijikata (土方)
Voiced by: Takayuki Kondō (Japanese); Luis Bermudez (English)
Hijikata is the other of Kazama's two best work friends. He has a massive crush on Sakurai, which she is oblivious to due to her feelings for Kazama.

== Media ==
=== Manga ===
Written and illustrated by Shiro Manta, My Senpai Is Annoying was first posted on the author's Twitter and Pixiv accounts on September 17, 2017. The series ended on July 26, 2024. It also began serialization via Ichijinsha's Comic Pool web magazine on July 6, 2018. Ichijinsha collected its chapters in thirteen tankōbon volumes, released from March 28, 2018, to February 3, 2025.

Seven Seas Entertainment holds the license to publish the manga in English in North America.

==== Volumes ====
No.	Original release date	Original ISBN	English release date	English ISBN
1	March 28, 2018	978-4-75-800981-2	May 26, 2020 (digital); July 7, 2020 (print)	978-1-64505-531-0
Chapters 1–20 and five extra chapters.
2	September 10, 2018	978-4-75-800997-3	September 22, 2020	978-1-64505-536-5
Chapters 21–40 and six extra chapters.
3	February 25, 2019	978-4-75-802026-8	November 3, 2020	978-1-64505-777-2
Chapters 41–57 and seven extra chapters.
4	September 25, 2019	978-4-75-802051-0	February 16, 2021	978-1-64505-965-3
Chapters 58–77 and four extra chapters.
5	July 2, 2020	978-4-75-802093-0	July 27, 2021	978-1-64827-253-0
Chapters 78–99 and four extra chapters.
6	November 25, 2020	978-4-75-802175-3	November 30, 2021	978-1-64827-351-3
Chapters 100–121 and four extra chapters.
7	April 28, 2021	978-4-75-802230-9	April 19, 2022	978-1-63858-211-3
Chapters 122–140 and six extra chapters.
8	September 28, 2021	978-4-75-802292-7	July 19, 2022	978-1-63858-357-8
Chapters 141–159 and four extra chapters.
9	May 25, 2022	978-4-75-802385-6	January 3, 2023	978-1-63858-856-6
Chapters 160–178 and four extra chapters.
10	December 26, 2022	978-4-75-802469-3	July 18, 2023	978-1-68579-521-4
Chapters 179–195 and four extra chapters.
11	July 25, 2023	978-4-75-802552-2	January 30, 2024	979-8-88843-256-3
Chapters 196–215 and two extra chapters.
12	May 24, 2024	978-4-75-802673-4	December 17, 2024	979-8-88843-804-6
Chapters 216–231 and two extra chapters.
13	February 3, 2025	978-4-75-802829-5	November 18, 2025	979-8-89561-699-4
Chapters 232–239 and four extra chapters.

=== Anime ===
On July 1, 2020, an anime television series adaptation produced by Doga Kobo was announced. The series was directed by Ryota Itoh, with Yoshimi Narita overseeing the series' scripts, Shigemitsu Abe designing the characters, and Hiroaki Tsutsumi composing the series' music. It aired from October 10 to December 26, 2021, on Tokyo MX, BS11, GYT, HTB, Animax, and TUF. (Note: Tokyo MX listed the series premiere at 25:00 on October 9, 2021, which is effectively 1:00 a.m. JST on October 10.) Tomori Kusunoki, Saori Hayami, Reina Aoyama, and Aoi Koga performed the opening theme "Annoying! San-san Week!", while Yui Horie performed the ending theme "Niji ga Kakaru made no Hanashi" ("The Story Across the Rainbow").

Funimation licensed the series outside of Asia. Muse Communication has licensed this series in South Asia and Southeast Asia. They licensed the series to Animax Asia for TV broadcasts.

==== Episodes ====
No.	Title (Note: All English titles are taken from Funimation.)	Directed by	Written by	Storyboarded by	Original release date
1	"Each Other's Stride"; Transliteration: "Otagai no Hohaba" (Japanese: お互いの歩幅)	Ryōta Itō	Yoshimi Narita	Ryōta Itō	October 10, 2021
Futaba Igarashi works for Itomaki Trading with goals of becoming a salesperson. Being diminutive stature, Igarashi is dwarfed by her senpai, Harumi Takeda, who is taller than average and teases her by tousling her hair. Igarashi and Takeda visit companies to give sales pitches. Takeda lets Igarashi give the pitch and she makes her very first sale. The next day, Igarashi learns she made a mistake and owes the client an apology, then feels worse when Takeda gives the apology. Igarashi forgets her train pass and returns to the office to retrieve it where she finds Takeda asleep, having worked late to fix her mistake. Igarashi returns to normal the next day, to her co-workers' relief, develops a better pitch and makes an even bigger sale to the client. She apologizes for causing Takeda trouble then they go out drinking to celebrate. Igarashi becomes drunk and, wondering why Takeda is nice to her, demands to know if he likes her, and he confirms that he does, like a daughter. Igarashi drunkenly bemoans not being thought of like his wife then quickly realizes what she just said and becomes embarrassed.
2	"Udon with the Occasional Full Moon"; Transliteration: "Udon, Tokidoki Mangetsu" (Japanese: うどん、ときどき満月)	Takashi Takeuchi	Yoshimi Narita	Ryōta Itō	October 17, 2021
The next day, Igarashi tells Takeda she did not mean what she said while Takeda admits he thought it was funny due to her being drunk. Igarashi is relieved yet disappointed. Souta Kazama has lunch with co-workers who all want to date Touko Sakurai, yet Kazama has never even tried asking her out. Igarashi is annoyed when the same co-workers comment she looks like Takeda's daughter. Igarashi asks Sakurai how to grow bigger breasts then panics when Sakurai assumes she wants to impress Takeda. Igarashi goes shopping with Natsumi Kurobe, and while trying on clothes pads her bra to see what big breasts would be like. Igarashi realizes she forgot to un-pad her bra when Takeda and Kazama both get on her train. However, Takeda remains oblivious. This upsets Igarashi who believes Takeda does not think of her as a woman. Sakurai is asked out by another co-worker, so Kazama helps her by faking a phone call, which Sakurai finds sweet. Takeda catches a creep taking photographs of Igarashi's underwear. Sakurai asks Kazama out to dinner. Igarashi admits she respects Takeda more now, but still punches him when he calls her a "little" lady.
3	"And Then, It's Christmas"; Transliteration: "Soshite Kurisumasu" (Japanese: そしてクリスマス)	Sumie Noro	Misaki Morie	Hiroaki Yoshikawa	October 24, 2021
Igarashi gives her scarf to a young girl, even though she herself is freezing, so Takeda gives her his scarf then tells everyone in the office, to her great embarrassment. Igarashi and Sakurai are selected to be office Santas. Igarashi considers buying Takeda a gift so Kurobe suggests a necktie. Sakurai in her Santa outfit is a big hit with the office men while Takeda teases Igarashi while wearing hers. Igarashi feels awkward about giving Takeda the tie and accidentally waits too long until Takeda has gone home. She sneaks into work early to leave it on Takeda's desk, but panics when Kazama also arrives early. No other opportunity appears but they do go for a Christmas meal after work. Sakurai has fun teasing Kazama about her costume while Kazama manages to ask her out for dinner, which she accepts. Igarashi finally gives Takeda the tie and Takeda reveals he also bought her a gift, a scarf to replace the one she gave away. Takeda does not wear the tie the next day for fear of getting it dirty and instead asks permission to display it on his desk, until a furious Igarashi forces him to wear it properly.
4	"Someone Who'll Be By Your Side"; Transliteration: "Soba ni Itekureru Hito" (Japanese: そばにいてくれる人)	Ryouki Kamitsubo	Yuka Yamada	Ryōki Kamitsubo	October 31, 2021
Igarashi catches a cold, which worries everyone. With nothing in the refrigerator at home, she is forced to shop for groceries, but she finds Takeda outside her apartment with a bag of groceriesfor her. He cooks her dinner and leaves when she falls asleep. Igarashi recovers but feels mortified when she realizes she invited Takeda in her apartment. Takeda decides to buy a smartphone as he was the last to learn Igarashi was sick, so Igarashi helps him shop for a smartphone on their day off. She promises to look after him if he ever gets sick. They are seen together by Kurobe, who calls Igarashi later to tease her. Igarashi waits impatiently for Takeda to send a text and with Kazama's help Takeda manages to send one, making her happy. Takeda also catches a cold so Igarashi goes to his apartment to return the favor, despite her embarrassment. After Takeda eats and falls asleep, Igarashi cannot help wondering what his chin stubble feels like. However, when he wakes up, she is so embarrassed she karate chops him and flees. The next day, Takeda thanks her, unintentionally letting their co-workers know she visited his apartment. As he enjoyed her cooking so much, she offers to cook for him again.
5	"Valentine Symphony"; Transliteration: "Barentain Kōkyōkyoku" (Japanese: バレンタイン交響曲)	Takafumi Fujii	Misaki Morie	Royden B, Ryōta Itō	November 7, 2021
Valentine's Day approaches. Igarashi and Kurobe help a young man find his way, making Igarashi happy when he recognizes her as an adult. Sakurai plans her usual chocolates for everyone, with the men all hoping to get special heartfelt chocolates this year. Igarashi spends most of the day without Takeda and feels sad, until he invites her to ramen after work. While waiting for Igarashi to arrive, Takeda saves the same young man from thieves. When Igarashi and Sakurai later arrive, they realize he is Yuto Sakurai, Touko's younger brother. Takeda and Igarashi go for ramen. Kazama sees Touko with Yuto and becomes very depressed as he assumes they are dating. Igarashi makes everyone chocolate, including a special green tea chocolate for Takeda as he does not like sweets, though she worries he might think it is heartfelt chocolate. Meanwhile, Touko gives heartfelt chocolate to Kazama, but he becomes upset when he thinks she is only giving it to him out of sheer courtesy. Touko quickly clarifies the misunderstanding about Yuto and Kazama apologizes. Igarashi later claims to have seen Kazama with a ridiculously big grin on his face, which everyone finds hard to believe.
6	"Grandpa Hearts Futaba"; Transliteration: "Futaba Daisuki Ojii-chan" (Japanese: 双葉大好きおじいちゃん)	Takashi Takeuchi	Yuka Yamada	Hiroaki Yoshikawa	November 14, 2021
Sakurai accidentally sends a misleading photograph of Igarashi and Takeda to Igarashi's grandfather. Igarashi goes shopping for her own birthday present, causing Takeda to realize their birthdays are the same day, so they buy each other flowers. Igarashi's grandfather then arrives and, despite having similar personalities, butts heads with Takeda over who has the right to tousle Igarashi's hair. Despite trying to avoid each other, Grandpa and Takeda have a lot of hobbies in common, repeatedly bumping into each other and competing childishly at fishing, baseball and even litter picking, gaining a grudging respect for each other. Grandpa reminisces about raising Igarashi until she decided to live by herself for high school. White Day arrives and Kazuma gets Sakurai macarons. Takeda gets Igarashi medicine for her yearly hayfever outbreak and an invitation to dinner for White Day. Takeda bumps into Grandpa in the bathroom and informs him Igarashi is doing just fine since she is as stubborn as Grandpa. Delinquents harass Igarashi but are swiftly punished by Takeda and Grandpa working together. Despite her annoyance at the both of them, Igarashi forgives them and all three go to dinner together.
7	"Here and Now"; Transliteration: "Ima, Koko de" (Japanese: いま、ここで)	Chao Nekotomi	Misaki Morie	Chao Nekotomi	November 21, 2021
As a child, Kurobe competed in sports day but she was tripped during the race. Igarashi remembers meeting Kurobe in junior school after getting lost. Kurobe tricked Igarashi into going to an amusement arcade. The office arranges to attend a blossom viewing party as a group. While jogging, Kurobe meets Yuto and learns he wants to play basketball but is too scared to join the basketball club. Kurobe advises him to at least try so he will not regret it later. It is revealed her sports day competitor tripped her on purpose, causing her to hate competitions. As such, Igarashi told her to run for fun instead. At the party, Igarashi likes the pink blossoms but is embarrassed Takeda prefers green, the color of her hair. They talk about Kurobe convincing Igarashi to join art club and even beat up the bullies who teased her. They became good friends after this and Kurobe ended up joining track and field club. Igarashi attributes her courage to Kurobe's friendship while Takeda asks her to draw something for him one day. The party ends when people start getting too drunk. Kurobe later learns from Touko that Yuto did finally join the basketball club.
8	"Everyone's Holidays"; Transliteration: "Sorezore no Kyūjitsu" (Japanese: それぞれの休日)	Tatsuya Nogimori, Hiroyuki Tsuchiya	Yoshimi Narita	Ryōta Itō	November 28, 2021
For Golden Week, Igarashi plans to clean her apartment. Meanwhile, Kazama overhears Sakurai rejecting another co-worker so he impulsively asks her on a date to an aquarium. Kazama is unsure how to act so he treats the situation like it is a game. Igarashi terrifies herself watching scary movies and calls Takeda, but hangs up from embarrassment. Regardless, Takeda visits her apartment. At the aquarium, Sakurai claims she and Kazama are a couple. Since they both have nothing else to do, Takeda and Igarashi decide to spend Golden Week together. Sakurai compliments Kazama on always helping others. During a dolphin show, he almost admitted his selfish reasons for doing so but is prevented when they were soaked by dolphin splash. Igarashi and Takeda go for ramen. Kazama buys Sakurai a dolphin toy that shares his name, Souta. Takeda wins Igarashi a toy from a claw machine. Sakurai is harassed by two men until Kazama claims they are together, making Sakurai blush even though he admits he borrows the words from a manga. Everyone returns to work happier than before.
9	"A Light-Hearted Summer Vacation"; Transliteration: "Ukiuki Natsuyasumi" (Japanese: ウキウキ夏休み)	Masako Satō	Yuka Yamada	Hiroaki Yoshikawa	December 5, 2021
Igarashi is invited to an overnight beach trip with Sakurai, Yūto, and Kurobe but is annoyed when Kazama and Takeda are invited, implying she feels inferior to Sakurai and Kurobe's since they are well-endowed chests. Takeda assures Igarashi he values her personality. Over dinner, Igarashi stops Takeda from revealing she has cooked for him several times. Elsewhere, Yūto reveals to Kurobe he has a friend who is a girl and other kids at his school tease him for it, but Kurobe assures him it is normal and suggests the girl might one day become his girlfriend. That night, the girls tease Igarashi for her implied closeness to Takeda before Kurobe interrogates Sakurai about Kazama. Meanwhile, Kazama cannot sleep due to Takeda's snoring. The next morning, Takeda and Sakurai interrogate each other about Igarashi and Kazama, respectively, embarrassing both who overhear the conversation. After another day of fun, Kazama gets more embarrassing photos of Takeda and Igarashi falling asleep together. Kurobe is glad Igarashi works with such nice people. Igarashi bravely asks Takeda to spend next summer together. The next day at work, it is clear Igarashi and Takeda both forgot sunscreen and both have dark tans.
10	"Autumn, or Ordinary Days"; Transliteration: "Aki, Aruiwa Nichijō no Hibi" (Japanese: 秋、あるいは日常の日々)	Jun Takada	Misaki Morie	Hiroaki Yoshikawa, Tetsuhito Saitō, Ryōta Itō	December 12, 2021
Fearing she has gained weight, Sakurai begins jogging but later has to hide her pain from Kazama. Takeda enters a pork bun eating contest against Mona Tsukishiro from their office, but she quits after discovering they are served hot. Kazama gives Yuto some basketball training, but gets hit in the face due to Yuto's inaccuracy. Sakurai is grateful to Kazama anyway. Igarashi becomes jealous learning Takeda spent time with Tsukishiro so Takeda takes Igarashi for pork buns as well. Takeda, Igarashi, and Kurobe join in the next basketball session, which annoys Sakurai. After a chaotic game, everyone quits due to various injuries, leaving only Kazama and Kurobe who stubbornly play against each other for almost two hours, annoying Touko since they were supposed to be helping Yuto. Afterwards, everyone decides to visit a public bath, except for Touko who insists on some alone time with Kazama. In the baths, Igarashi is upset she has not grown at all since middle school, whereas Yuto discovers the secret to Takeda's size is lots of food, sleep, and milk. Touko and Kazama get hot dogs while everyone else gets milk after their hot baths to grow bigger.
11	"The Seasons Come and Go"; Transliteration: "Meguru Kisetsu" (Japanese: めぐる季節)	Chao Nekotomi, Takashi Takeuchi	Yuka Yamada	Sumie Noro, Masayoshi Nishida	December 19, 2021
At the end of year office party, everyone discusses their plans for New Year's. Later at Touko's house, Yuto has plans with his friends, meaning Touko and Kazama will be alone all night. Elsewhere, while Igarashi spends the night with Kurobe, she misses Takeda. The next morning, everyone visits the shrine for New Year's Day. Igarashi spots Takeda so Kurobe makes an excuse to leave Igarashi alone with Takeda. They have their fortunes drawn and both receive the message the person they have been waiting for is right beside them, though they both hide this from each other. Later at Takeda's favorite restaurant, Igarashi watches Kazama and Touko being interviewed on TV where they talk about Igarashi and Takeda's uncertain relationship, which causes Igarashi to furiously rush back to the shrine to punish Kazama, all while Takeda remains oblivious. After he recovers, Kazama tells Touko he much preferred spending the day with her than his original plan of spending the time alone. A nearby child attempts to show Kazama a photo she took, but Touko prevents Kazama from seeing it as it shows her kissing him while he was unconscious.
12	"My Senpai Is Annoying"; Transliteration: "Senpai ga Uzai Kōhai no Hanashi" (Japanese: 先輩がうざい後輩の話)	Ryōta Itō	Yoshimi Narita	Ryōta Itō	December 26, 2021
Takeda lands a new client and Igarashi worries he still thinks of her as a rookie so she volunteers to do one of his presentations by herself. The presentation is a success so Igarashi has ramen to celebrate. However, without Takeda, she does not enjoy it. She feels worse when Takeda is invited to drinks by the office ladies. Depressed, she goes drinking alone and remembers her first day of work when Takeda mistook her for a schoolgirl. A drunk mistakes Igarashi for a child and scolds her for drinking alcohol, until Takeda arrives, sends the drunk away, then joins Igarashi, explaining he would rather drink with her than the other ladies. Igarashi almost asks Takeda if he likes her again but stops herself. Takeda claims Igarashi has grown a lot in just a year, making her proud. She warns him she will one day be a full-grown salesperson and will not need him anymore, so he promises to be by her side every day until that happens. While walking in the rain, Igarashi must share Takeda's umbrella, flustering her when he pulls her in close. As such, she declares him to still be her annoying senpai.

== Reception ==
In 2018, the series won the fourth Next Manga Award in the web manga category.
