= The Tale of the Outcasts =

Japanese manga series

- First tankōbon volume cover, featuring Wisteria (left) and Marbas (right)

ノケモノたちの夜 (Nokemono-tachi no Yoru)
- Genre: Dark fantasy; Historical fantasy; Supernatural
- Manga
- Written by: Makoto Hoshino
- Published by: Shogakukan
- English publisher: NA: Seven Seas Entertainment
- Imprint: Shōnen Sunday Comics
- Magazine: Weekly Shōnen Sunday
- Original run: August 7, 2019 – April 14, 2021
- Volumes: 8
- Anime television series
- Directed by: Yasutaka Yamamoto
- Written by: Kenichi Yamashita
- Music by: Hiroaki Tsutsumi; Kana Hashiguchi
- Studio: Ashi Productions
- Licensed by: Crunchyroll
- Original network: Tokyo MX, ytv, BS Fuji
- Original run: January 8, 2023 – April 2, 2023
- Episodes: 13
- Manga

The Tale of the Outcasts: The Flame Knight
- Written by: Makoto Hoshino
- Published by: Shogakukan
- Imprint: Shōnen Sunday Comics
- Magazine: Sunday Webry
- Original run: January 8, 2023 – March 5, 2023
- Volumes: 1

The Tale of the Outcasts (Japanese: ノケモノたちの夜, Hepburn: Nokemono-tachi no Yoru) is a Japanese manga series written and illustrated by Makoto Hoshino. It was serialized in Shogakukan's shōnen manga magazine Weekly Shōnen Sunday from August 2019 to April 2021, with its chapters collected in eight tankōbon volumes. The series is licensed for English release in North America by Seven Seas Entertainment. An anime television series adaptation by Ashi Productions aired from January to April 2023.

== Plot ==
Wisteria is an orphan girl living in a corner of the British Empire at the end of the 19th century. Her life is desolate and bleak–until she encounters Marbas, a powerful but equally lonely immortal being with a furry appearance, hounded by hunters. Together, Wisteria and Marbas roam the Empire–populated by humans and human-like beasts–in search of a place where they can live together in peace.

== Characters ==
Wisteria Langley (ウィステリア・ラングレイ, Uisuteria Rangurei)
Voiced by: Ayana Taketatsu
A girl who was treated like a slave. She was born with the ability to see demons. She makes a contract with the great demon Marbas, offering her "sight" to him, and goes about her daily life with Marbas as a free woman.
Marbas (マルバス, Marubasu)
Voiced by: Katsuyuki Konishi
A demon who looks like a lion. A great demon who used to be feared, but now that the number of people who can see demons has decreased, he spends his days bored. He makes a contract with Wisteria, a girl who can see demons, and goes about his daily life with her.
Snow Langley (スノウ・ラングレイ, Sunō Rangurei)
Voiced by: Ryōta Ōsaka
The older brother of Wisteria who was separated from her. His love for his sister is very deep. He wears the clothes of a clergyman and belongs to the Knights of the Sword Cross. However, he is somewhat of a delinquent.
Takenami (タケナミ)
Voiced by: Kentarō Kumagai
A captain of the Knights of the Sword Cross and Snow's colleague. He wields a Japanese sword.
Diana Blackbell (レディー・ダイアナ・ブラックベル, Daiana Burakkuberu)
Voiced by: Risa Imayanagi
The only daughter of the Earl Blackbell family. A young lady of noble birth. She has made a contract with the great demon Naberius. She also has a friendly demeanor.
Naberius (ナベリウス, Naberiusu)
Voiced by: Junichi Suwabe
A demon who looks like a wolf. A great demon. One of the Thirteen Plagues of the Collapsed Kingdom. He has made a contract with Diana, a young lady of noble birth.
Commander of the Knights of the Sword Cross (剣十字騎士団団長, Kenjūji Kishidan Danchō)
Voiced by: Ryōtarō Okiayu
The leader of the Knights of the Sword Cross, a demon-slaying organization based in Europe, mainly in England. He always wears armor. His real name is Sol Adams (ソル・アダムス, Adamusu Soru).
Astaroth (アスタロト, Asutaroto)
Voiced by: Yū Kobayashi
A demon who looks like a bird. A great demon who was counted among the Thirteen Plagues of the Broken Kingdom. She was defeated by the Commander and made a contract with the Knights of the Sword Cross after being tortured.
Dantalion (ダンタリオン, Dantarion)
Voiced by: Shunsuke Takeuchi
A demon who looks like a bull. One of the Thirteen Plagues. He has a contract with Luther. In exchange for making Luther fight for his life, he has made a pact with him to restore his lost memories. He wants humans to wage war.
Sitri (シトリ, Shitori)
Voiced by: Yoshitsugu Matsuoka
A demon who looks like a dragon. A great demon and another of the Thirteen Plagues. He sleeps at the bottom of a lake in the Lake District. Once he sleeps, he doesn't wake up for several hundred years. His words and actions are full of mysteries.
Luther Roosevelt (ルーサー・ローズヴェルト, Rūsā Rōzuvueruto)
Voiced by: Yūki Ono
A veteran of the Afghan War who fought alongside Snow. Works with the two pillars of the Thirteen Plagues, Citri and Dantalion. Wants to fight and declares war on the Knights of the Sword Cross.
John H. Watson (ジョン・H・ワトソン, Jon Eichi Watoson)
Voiced by: Atsushi Abe
A military doctor who spent time on the battlefield with Snow and Luther.
Sherlock Holmes (シャーロック・ホームズ, Shārokku Hōmuzu)
Voiced by: Makoto Furukawa
London's most famous detective.
Maury (モリー, Morī)
Voiced by: Chitose Morinaga
Harriet Carter (ハリエット, Harietto)
Voiced by: Karin Oda
Iberta (イベルタ, Iberuta)
Voiced by: Gara Takashima
Stanley (スタンリー, Sutanrī)
Voiced by: Hidenori Takahashi
Shura (シュラ)
Voiced by: Koutaro Nishiyama
Vivian (ビビアン, Bibian)
Voiced by: Iori Saeki
Lucia (ルシア, Rushia)
Voiced by: Shizuka Itō

== Media ==
=== Manga ===
The Tale of the Outcasts, written and illustrated by Makoto Hoshino, was serialized in Shogakukan's shōnen manga anthology Weekly Shōnen Sunday from August 7, 2019, to April 14, 2021. Shogakukan collected its chapters in eight tankōbon volumes, released from November 18, 2019, to May 18, 2021.

On August 28, 2020, Seven Seas Entertainment announced the English language release of the manga starting on June 1, 2021.

A nine-chapter special manga series by Hoshino, subtitled The Flame Knight, was serialized in Shogakukan's Sunday Webry website from January 8 to March 5, 2023. A single volume was published on March 16, 2023.

==== Volumes ====
No.	Original release date	Original ISBN	English release date	English ISBN
1	November 18, 2019	978-4-09-129443-2	June 1, 2021	978-1-64827-115-1
2	February 18, 2020	978-4-09-129558-3	August 24, 2021	978-1-64827-323-0
3	June 18, 2020	978-4-09-850075-8	October 12, 2021	978-1-64827-923-2
4	August 18, 2020	978-4-09-850136-6	January 4, 2022	978-1-64827-580-7
5	September 18, 2020	978-4-09-850179-3	June 28, 2022	978-1-63858-205-2
6	December 18, 2020	978-4-09-850287-5	November 15, 2022	978-1-63858-345-5
7	May 18, 2021	978-4-09-850399-5	May 23, 2023	978-1-63858-794-1
8	May 18, 2021	978-4-09-850527-2	November 14, 2023	978-1-68579-328-9

=== Anime ===
An anime television series adaptation was announced on June 30, 2022. At Anime Expo 2022, Crunchyroll announced that it would stream the series outside of Asia. At Crunchyroll Expo 2022, it was announced that the series would be animated by Ashi Productions and directed by Yasutaka Yamamoto, with Kenichi Yamashita in charge of series composition and writing scripts along with Yamamoto and Sayaka Harada; Mina Ōsawa designing the characters and serving as chief animation supervisor along with Hikaru Suzuki; Kanta Suzuki designing the monsters; and Hiroaki Tsutsumi and Kana Hashiguchi composing the music. It aired from January 8 to April 2, 2023, on Tokyo MX and other networks. Ayana Taketatsu performed the opening theme song "Ashita no Katachi" (明日のカタチ; "Shape of Tomorrow"), while Hakubi performed the ending theme song "Rewrite".

==== Episodes ====
No.	Title	Directed by (Note: Information is taken from the ending credits of each episode.)	Written by	Storyboarded by	Original release date
1	"Let's be alone together"	Yasutaka Yamamoto	Kenichi Yamashita	Yasutaka Yamamoto	January 8, 2023
2	"Encounter"; Transliteration: "Kaikō" (Japanese: 邂逅)	Xiao Can Chen	Kenichi Yamashita	Kosuke Shirota	January 15, 2023
3	"Riverside Murder"; Transliteration: "Ribāsaido Mādā" (Japanese: リバーサイド・マーダー)	Michita Shiraishi	Yasutaka Yamamoto	Saori Yamamoto	January 22, 2023
4	"Snowbound Manor"; Transliteration: "Sekka no Yakata" (Japanese: 雪下の館)	Sayaka Tsuji	Sayaka Harada	Hiroyuki Hata	January 29, 2023
5	"Confronting Calamity"; Transliteration: "Yakusai Kairin" (Japanese: 厄災解臨)	Xiao Can Chen	Yasutaka Yamamoto	Kosuke Shirota	February 5, 2023
6	"Guiding Light"; Transliteration: "Michibiku Akari" (Japanese: 導く灯)	Keita Nakano	Kenichi Yamashita	Yoshihisa Iida	February 12, 2023
7	"The Echo of Gunfire and the Rise of the Curtain"; Transliteration: "Kaimaku wa Kako no Jūsei to Tomoni" (Japanese: 開幕は過去の銃声と共に)	Yasutaka Yamamoto	Sayaka Harada	Shin Matsuo	February 19, 2023
8	"Something in the rainy night"	Hideki Tonokatsu	Yasutaka Yamamoto	Hideki Tonokatsu	February 26, 2023
9	"Bullfight"; Transliteration: "Tōgyū" (Japanese: 闘牛)	Michita Shiraishi	Kenichi Yamashita	Yasutaka Yamamoto; Saori Yamamoto	March 5, 2023
10	"The London Demonic Battlefront"; Transliteration: "Rondon Taima Sensen" (Japanese: ロンドン対魔戦線)	Xiao Can Chen	Kenichi Yamashita	Hiroyuki Hata; Kia Asamiya	March 12, 2023
11	"A Legacy"; Transliteration: "Nokoshitai Mono" (Japanese: 残したいもの)	Michita Shiraishi; Masaki Utsunomiya	Sayaka Harada	Masayoshi Nishida	March 19, 2023
12	"Journey through Memories"; Transliteration: "Kioku no Tabiji" (Japanese: 記憶の旅路)	Mikirō Shiiba	Kenichi Yamashita	Fumikazu Satō	March 26, 2023
13	"You mean the world to me."	Yasutaka Yamamoto, Mizuki Sasaki	Sayaka Harada	Yasutaka Yamamoto, Masayoshi Nishida	April 2, 2023

== See also ==
- Ryū Okuri no Isagi, another manga series by the same author
