= Jujutsu Kaisen season 1 (soundtrack) =

Jujutsu Kaisen Original Soundtrack

Soundtrack album by Hiroaki Tsutsumi, Yoshimasa Terui, and Alisa Okehazama
- Released: April 21, 2021
- Studios: Sony Music (Shinjuku, Tokyo, Japan)
- Length: 153:25
- Label: Toho Animation
- Director: Yoshiki Kobayashi
- Producer: Yoshiki Kobayashi

Jujutsu Kaisen soundtrack albums chronology
Jujutsu Kaisen Original Soundtrack (2021)	Jujutsu Kaisen 0 (Original Motion Picture Soundtrack) (2021)

TV Animation Jujutsu Kaisen Original Soundtrack (TVアニメ「呪術廻戦」オリジナル・サウンドトラック, TV Anime「Jujutsu Kaisen」Orijinaru・Saundotorakku) is the soundtrack to the 2020 TV anime series Jujutsu Kaisen. It was composed by Hiroaki Tsutsumi, Yoshimasa Terui, and Alisa Okehazama, and released on April 21, 2021, by Toho Animation Records.

== Track listing ==
Disc 1
No.	Title	Lyrics	Music	Artist	Length
1.	"A Thousand-Year Curse (千年の呪い, Sennen no Noroi)"		Yoshimasa Terui	Terui	1:44
2.	"The Source of the Curse (呪いの源, Noroi no Minamoto)"		Alisa Okehazama	Okehazama	2:25
3.	"Takagi vs. Itadori (高木 VS 虎杖)"		Okehazama	Okehazama	2:17
4.	"Occult Phenomenon Research Club (オカ研, Oka-ken)" (featuring Paranom, and Aztech)		Hiroaki Tsutsumi	Tsutsumi, Paranom, and Aztech	2:05
5.	"As Usual (いつも通りでいい, Itsumodōri de ii)"	Tsutsumi	Okehazama	Okehazama	2:04
6.	"Looming Threat (迫る危険, Semaru Kiken)"		Terui	Terui	2:45
7.	"Impatience" (featuring Paranom, and Kasper)		Tsutsumi	Tsutsumi, Paranom, and Kasper	2:39
8.	"Ryōmen Sukuna (両面宿儺)"	Tsutsumi	Tsutsumi	Tsutsumi	4:01
9.	"The Scariest (最恐, Saikyō)" (featuring RIN)			Tsutsumi, and RIN	3:22
10.	"Your Battle is My Battle" (featuring Chica)		Tsutsumi	Tsutsumi, and Chica	4:03
11.	"Be Prepared" (featuring Che Lingo)	Chica	Tsutsumi	Tsutsumi, and Che Lingo	3:07
12.	"Attack of Cursed Corpse (呪骸の攻撃, Jugai no Kōgeki)"	Tsutsumi	Terui	Terui	1:44
13.	"Feelings of Regret (後悔の気持ち, Kōkai no Kimochi)"		Tsutsumi	Tsutsumi	2:04
14.	"The Beginning (始まり, Hajimari)"		Okehazama	Okehazama	1:44
15.	"Life" (featuring Paranom, Kasper, and Aztech)		Okehazama	Okehazama, Paranom, Kasper, and Aztech	2:41
16.	"Colors" (featuring Aztech)	Okehazama	Okehazama	Okehazama, and Aztech	1:06
17.	"Learn the Lesson" (featuring Kasper, and Aztech)	Okehazama	Tsutsumi	Tsutsumi, Kasper, and Aztech	1:53
18.	"Countermeasure for Domain Expansion (領域展開への対抗手段, Ryōiki Tenkai e no Taikō Shudan)"	Tsutsumi	Tsutsumi, Okehazama	Tsutsumi, and Okehazama	2:46
19.	"Straw Doll Technique「Resonance」 (芻霊呪法「共鳴り」, Sūrei Juhō「Tomonari」)"		Terui	Terui	1:35
20.	"Curse Womb Must Die (呪胎戴天, Jutai Taiten)"	Terui	Tsutsumi	Tsutsumi	3:30
21.	"Extraordinary Emergency (緊急事態で異常事態, Kinkyūjitai de Ijō Jitai)"		Okehazama	Okehazama	2:30
22.	"Put It in This Fist (拳にのせろ, Kobushi ni Nosero)"		Tsutsumi	Tsutsumi	2:38
23.	"Power of Special Grade Curse (特級呪霊の力, Tokkyū Jurei no Chikara)"		Okehazama	Okehazama	2:33
24.	"An Unfair Reality Granted to All Equally (平等に与えられている不平等な現実, Byōdō ni Ataerareteiru Fubyōdō na Genjitsu)"		Terui	Terui	2:31
25.	"Jujutsu Sorcerer Megumi Fushiguro (呪術師・伏黒恵, Jujutsushi・Fushiguro Megumi)"		Terui	Terui	3:34
26.	"Strong and Intelligent Allies (強く聡い仲間, Tsuyoku Satoi Nakama)"		Okehazama	Okehazama	3:23
27.	"Eradicate (根絶やし, Nedayashi)"		Tsutsumi	Tsutsumi	2:14
28.	"Unguarded Moment (隙, Suki)"		Okehazama	Okehazama	3:06
29.	"Apology for a Defeat (敗北の謝罪, Haiboku no Shazai)"		Okehazama	Okehazama	3:04
30.	"Jujutsu Kaisen (呪術廻戦)"		Tsutsumi, Alisa Okehazama	Tsutsumi, and Alisa Okehazama	1:50
Total length:					76:48

Disc 2
No.	Title	Lyrics	Music	Artist	Length
1.	"The Man・Aoi Tōdō (漢・東堂葵, Otoko・Tōdō Aoi)"		Tsutsumi	Tsutsumi	2:22
2.	"Blood" (featuring Che Lingo)	Tsutsumi	Tsutsumi	Tsutsumi, and Lingo	4:16
3.	"To Select How to Die (死に方を選ぶために, Shinikata o Erabu Tameni)"		Tsutsumi	Tsutsumi	2:54
4.	"Investigation with Mr. Ichiji (伊地知さんと調査, Ijichi-san to Chōsa)"		Okehazama	Okehazama	3:09
5.	"7:3"		Okehazama	Okehazama	3:32
6.	"Working Overtime (時間外労働, Jikangairōdō)"		Terui	Terui	2:09
7.	"Sunset and Friend (夕焼けと友達, Yūyake to Tomodachi)"		Tsutsumi	Tsutsumi	2:21
8.	"Beyond Sacrifice (犠牲の先, Gisei no Saki)"		Okehazama	Okehazama	2:16
9.	"The Words That Came from Deep Inside My Gut (腹の底から出た本音, Hara no Soko Kara Deta Honne)"		Tsutsumi	Tsutsumi	4:21
10.	"Eye Catch A (アイキャッチ A, Aikyatchi A)"		Tsutsumi	Tsutsumi	0:08
11.	"Eye Catch B (アイキャッチ B, Aikyatchi B)"		Tsutsumi	Tsutsumi	0:08
12.	"Self-Embodiment of Perfection (自閉円頓裹, Jihei Endonka)"		Okehazama	Okehazama	1:53
13.	"Stand in the Darkness" (featuring Steve Memmolo)	Chica	Tsutsumi	Tsutsumi, and Steve Memmolo	4:29
14.	"Preview of the Next Episode 1 (次回予告1, Jikaiyokoku 1)"		Okehazama	Okehazama	0:13
15.	"Preview of the Next Episode 2 (次回予告2, Jikaiyokoku 2)"	Tsutsumi	Tsutsumi	Tsutsumi	0:13
16.	"Gray Eyes" (featuring Che Lingo)	Okehazama	Okehazama	Okehazama, and Lingo	2:57
17.	"A Curse Born From Mankind (人から生まれた呪い, Hito kara Umareta Noroi)"		Okehazama	Okehazama	2:44
18.	"Brother (ブラザー, Buraza)"		Tsutsumi	Tsutsumi	2:39
19.	"Memories That Didn't Exist (存在しない記憶, Sonzai Shinai Kioku)"		Tsutsumi	Tsutsumi	2:31
20.	"One Day... Together With Everyone... (いつか皆と一緒に..., Itsuka Minna to Isshoni...)"		Tsutsumi	Tsutsumi	2:09
21.	"Fight Again" (featuring Chica)	Chica	Tsutsumi	Tsutsumi, and Chica	4:04
22.	"Entertain Us" (featuring Chica)	Chica	Okehazama	Okehazama, and Chica	2:24
23.	"Upbringing (生い立ち, Oitachi)"		Terui	Terui	2:54
24.	"Liar (嘘つき, Usotsuki)"		Okehazama	Okehazama	3:15
25.	"Description of the Cursed Spirit (呪霊の説明, Jurei no Setsumei)"		Tsutsumi & Okehazama	Tsutsumi, and Okehazama	1:30
26.	"Boogie Woogie (不義遊戯, Fugi Yūgi)"		Terui	Terui	3:16
27.	"Hollow「Purple」 (虚式「茈」, Kyoshiki「Murasaki」)"		Okehazama	Okehazama	3:53
28.	"Jujutsu Kōshien (呪術甲子園, Jujutsu Kōshien)"		Okehazama	Okehazama	2:08
29.	"Remember"	Masato from coldrain	Tsutsumi	Tsutsumi, and Masato from coldrain	4:03
30.	"Hurt (痛み, Itami)"		Tsutsumi	Tsutsumi	1:46
Total length:					153:25

== Personnel ==
Main

- Hiroaki Tsutsumi (堤 博明, Tsutsumi Hiroaki) – lyrics, music, piano, electric sitar, electric bass, low whistle, voice, oud, programming
- Yoshimasa Terui (照井 順政, Terui Yoshimasa) – lyrics, music, piano, programming
- Alisa Okehazama (桶狭間 ありさ, Okehazama Arisa) – lyrics, music, programming, other instruments

Supporting

- Annette Philip, Shion Miura (三浦 詩音, Miura Shion), Chica, Masato from Coldrain – vocals
- Chica – lyrics, backing vocals
- Paranom, Aztech, Kasper, RIN, Che Lingo – rap
- Hideki Aoyama (青山 英樹, Aoyama Hideki) from Babymetal – drums
- Ikuo, Tabokun – bass
- Tetsurō Tōyama (遠山 哲朗, Tōyama Tetsurō), 遠山哲朗, Junko Sugawara (菅原 潤子, Sugawara Junko) – electric guitar, acoustic guitar
- Daisuke Kadowaki Strings (門脇大輔ストリングス, Kadowaki Daisuke sutoringusu) – strings
- Daisuke Kadowaki (門脇 大輔, Kadowaki Daisuke), Sena Ōshima (大嶋 世菜, Ōshima Sena), Daisuke Yamamoto (山本 大将, Yamamoto Daisuke), Yōko Fujinawa (藤縄 陽子, Fujinawa Yōko), Leina Ushiyama (牛山 玲名, Ushiyama Reina), Natsumi Okimasu (沖増 菜摘, Okimasu Natsumi) – 1st violin
- Kazuha Takahashi (高橋 和葉, Takahashi Kazuha), Yayoi Fujita (藤田 弥生, Fujita Yayoi), Makiko Tomokiyo (友清 麻樹子, Tomokiyo Makiko), Yuki Nakajima (中島 優紀, Nakajima Yuki), Natsue Kameda (亀田 夏絵, Kameda Natsue), Kano Tajima (田島 華乃, Tajima Kano) – 2nd violin
- Tomoko Shimaoka (島岡 智子, Shimaoka Tomoko), Reiichi Tateizumi (舘泉 礼一, Tateizumi Reiichi), Chikako Nishimura (西村 知佳子, Nishimura Chikako) – viola
- Masabumi Sekiguchi (関口 将史, Sekiguchi Masabumi), Yoshie Furukawa (古川 淑恵, Furukawa Yoshie) – cello
- Masashi Kimura (木村 将之, Kimura Masashi), Shigeki Ippon (一本 茂樹, Ippon Shigeki) – contrabass
- Akio Noguchi (野口 明生, Noguchi Akio) – Irish flute, tin whistle, duduk
- Yūsuke Orita (織田 祐亮, Orita Yūsuke) – trumpet
- Yūsuke Baba (馬場 祐介, Baba Yūsuke) – trombone
- Tomoko Yokoyama (横山 知子, Yokoyama Tomoko) – alto sax, tenor sax
- Junnosuke Fujita (藤田 淳之介, Fujita Junnosuke) – baritone sax
- Taiki Ōyama (大山 泰輝, Ōyama Taiki) – piano
- Reiko Tsuchiya (土屋 玲子, Tsuchiya Reiko) – erhu
- Ryōichi Kayatani (萱谷 亮一, Kayatani Ryōichi) – percussion
- Mimi – hammered dulcimer
- Hiroshi Fukuzawa (福沢 宏, Fukuzawa Hiroshi) – viola da gamba

Artwork

- Sunghoo Park (Korean: 박성후) – artwork

Engineers / Directors / Producers

- Hiroya Takayama (髙山 浩也, Takayama Hiroya) – recording engineer, mixing engineer
- Yoshinori Adachi (安達 義規, Adachi Yoshinori) – strings recording engineer
- Yuki Kanesaka, Yōki Yamamoto (山本 友樹, Yamamoto Yōki) – vocal recording engineer, vocal direction
- Mitsuyasu Abe (阿部 充泰, Abe Mitsuyasu) – mastering engineer
- Kōhei Amino (網野 航平, Amino Kōhei) – score assistant
- Yoshiki Kobayashi (小林 健樹, Kobayashi Yoshiki) – music producer, music director
- MAPPA – finishing work

Coordinators / Sales / Supervisor

- Takanori Satō (佐藤 貴則, Satō Takanori) – design
- Atsushi Yoshikawa (吉川 敦史, Yoshikawa Atsushi) – product coordinator
- Gō Inagaki (稲垣 豪, Gō Inagaki), Mei Nashimoto (梨本 萌以, Nashimoto Mei), Yasuyo Uetsuji (上辻 康代, Uetsuji Yasuyo) – sales promotion
- Hiroaki Matsutani (松谷 浩明, Matsutani Hiroaki) – music supervisor

Special Thanks

- Kentarō Tanaka (田中 健太郎, Tanaka Kentarō), Maki Sasayama (笹山 真希, Sasayama Maki), Tatsurō Watanabe (渡部 達郎, Watanabe Tatsurō), Jujutsu Kaisen Production Committee (呪術廻戦製作委員会, Jujutsu Kaisen Seisaku Iinkai)

Studios

- Recorded / mixed / mastered at Sony Music Studios (Shinjuku, Tokyo, Japan)
