= List of Hyperdimension Neptunia: The Animation episodes =

Series title card from Episodes 1 to 9.

Hyperdimension Neptunia: The Animation is a 2013 Japanese anime television series based on the Hyperdimension Neptunia video game series although featuring a storyline independent of the games themselves. In the world of Gamindustri, beings known as Goddesses rule over the four countries: Planeptune, Lastation, Lowee, and Leanbox. After having fought over Share energy for many years, the Goddesses signed a treaty which forbids each from taking Share energy from the other using forceful means.

The anime adaptation is produced by David Production of Japan and directed by Masahiro Mukai. Series composition and script writing are done by Shogo Yasukawa, with a musical score composed by Hiroaki Tsutsumi, Kenji Kaneko and Masaru Yokoyama. Character designs are done by Hitomi Takechi, based on the original designs by Tsunako along with art direction by Masanobu Nomura and sound direction by Jin Aketagawa. A manga series illustrated by Mikage Baku which complements the television animation, titled Hyperdimension Neptune: The Animation - Hello New World, began serialisation within the June 2013 issue of Dengeki Maoh. A spin-off novel of the anime, titled Hyperdimension Neptune TGS Hono no Futsukakan, was published by MF Bunko J and released 25 May 2013.

The twelve-episode series aired from July 12 to September 27, 2013, on Tokyo MX and were later aired on BS11, KBS, Sun TV, and tvk. The series was acquired by Funimation for online streaming in North America with both the English dub and the original Japanese dub with English subtitles.

The opening theme is "Dimension tripper!!!" by nao and the ending theme is "Neptune☆Sagashite" (ネプテューヌ☆サガして) by Afilia Saga. "Go→Love&Peace" by Ayane is used as the ending theme of episodes 3 and 4, which is also the ending theme song of Hyperdimension Neptunia mk2, in addition to "Ito" (糸) by Afilia Saga on episode 10. Insert songs include "Hard beat x Break beat" by nao during episode 12, and "Kirihirake! Glazy☆Star" (きりひらけ! グレイシー☆スター) by nao in Japanese and Caitlin Glass in English for episode 3, which is also the opening theme song of Hyperdimension Neptunia mk2. The OVA episode contains the insert song "Kami Jigen! Fortune Material" (神次元!ふぉーちゅん・まてりある) by nao, which is also the opening theme song of Hyperdimension Neptunia Victory.

== Episode list ==
No.	Title	Directed by	Original release date
1	"The Goddess(Neptune) of Planeptune"; Transliteration: "Puranetyūnu no megami(neputyūnu)" (Japanese: プラネテューヌの女神(ネプテューヌ))	Masayuki Katō	July 12, 2013
In Planeptune, the CPUs of Gamindustri have signed a friendship treaty, banning the use of military force to take Shares. A month has passed since then. With the Planeptune's Shares declining shown through the power of the Sharicite due to idleness, Neptune decided to learn more about the duties of a CPU from Noire. Noire initially declined to help, but she later helped Neptune by getting her assigned to a monster extermination mission. Neptune, with the help of Nepgear, IF, and Compa, took care of the Dogoos in Nasuume Highlands (despite initially getting overpowered, leading to Iffy defeating them in a fit of anger), while Noire took care of the monsters in Toruune Cave. In HDD form, Noire handled the monsters within with ease until she reverted to her human form for an unknown reason. Cornered by an Ancient Dragon, Noire was overwhelmed until Neptune went and defeated the Ancient Dragon. Somewhere near Toruune Cave, Warechu and Arfoire were revealed to be searching something within the cave. Planeptune gained some Shares, but it's unknown whether it's due to Neptune completing the mission or certain photos of Nepgear that were leaked on the Internet.
2	"Lowee's Terror(Lickorrist)"; Transliteration: "Ruuī no kyōkō(perorisuto)" (Japanese: ルウィーの兇行(ペロリスト))	Hirokazu Yamada	July 19, 2013
On Lowee, Blanc overexerts herself with work, while her sisters Rom and Ram are pulling pranks much to her annoyance. Neptune, Nepgear, Vert, Noire, and Uni make a visit to Lowee and take Rom and Ram to an amusement park, while Blanc stays behind to continue working. Rom and Ram are kidnapped by CFW Trick and Linda. Blanc becomes exhausted after Abnes shows up to interview her after leaking the kidnapping to the public. With the help of Vert and Leanbox's advanced technology, Rom and Ram are located. Trick abuses the girls by licking them repeatedly, while Linda plots to ransom the girls. Their plan is foiled when Neptune, Noire, and Vert arrive and use their HDD powers. Rom and Ram are saved when Blanc arrives and defeats Trick with her powers as White Heart. Blanc then apologizes to Rom and Ram for being too hard on them. Meanwhile, the maid that had been serving Blanc is revealed to be Arfoire in disguise, and she is in possession of a red crystal.
3	"A Weekend(Girls' Night Out) at Leanbox"; Transliteration: "Rīnbokkusu no shūmatsu(gāruzunaito)" (Japanese: リーンボックスの週末(ガールズナイト))	Hitomi Ezoe	July 26, 2013
Vert invites the other CPUs and their sisters to Leanbox for a party. They go to a 5pb. concert, with the exception of Vert, who the girls later find out is too busy playing an MMO and did not prepare for a party. Disappointed there was no party, the others decide to prepare one for themselves instead. On the way back from shopping for party food, Nepgear picks up a red crystal dropped by Warechu (who had tripped earlier and tended to by Compa) and suddenly becomes dizzy. Compa and IF head towards Nepgear, just as Warechu runs away with the crystal. During the party, a mass monster outbreak occurs on a nearby island within the Zune District and the CPUs go to stop it before it reaches the city. Meanwhile, IF finds out the mouse (Warechu) is on the blacklist for every country and took a boat to the same place where the outbreak was. Finding that suspicious, IF and Nepgear head out to the area. After defeating the monsters, the CPUs are captured by Arfoire in a barrier made by the anti-crystals, slowly draining their Share power. Iffy and Nepgear arrive too late, only to be shocked by the sight of the captured CPUs. As the result All 4 CPU are declared:MIA. But luckily the CPU manage to press a Panic button in their weapons handle which send an emergency signal to the basilicom and also blink a Morse code message spelled out "SOS HEART PURPLE BLACK WHITE GREEN".
4	"The Sisters' Resolve(Turn)"; Transliteration: "Imōto-tachi no ketsui(tān)" (Japanese: 妹たちの決意(ターン))	Yoshinobu Tokumoto	August 2, 2013
Iffy and Nepgear flee the Zune district and return to the Leanbox Basilicom. Histoire recommends everyone return home but after Uni berates Nepgear, she admits that she is unable to transform due to her having "a limiter on her heart". As a result of their shared desire to gain their HDD forms, the candidates decide to train so they can acquire that ability. The candidates, IF and Compa return to the Zune district before they complete their training to stop share loss after pictures of the subdued goddesses are leaked to the net. As the result of their captivity, all four candidates declare the status of all four goddesses (including Neptune): POW. Despite managing to hold their own for a while, each of the CPU candidates are picked off one by one by the ensuing onslaught of monsters. In a moment of panic, Nepgear tries to call out for Neptune's help, but realises that her reliance on her sister is holding her back as she is afraid of growing stronger than Neptune. This allows her to unlock her HDD form: Purple Sister. After destroying the rest of the monsters within their immediate vicinity, Nepgear and the others head towards a sea of monsters within the distance.
5	"The Goddesses' Resonance(Over Limit)"; Transliteration: "Megami-tachi no kyōmei(ōbārimitto)" (Japanese: 女神たちの共鳴(オーバーリミット))	Yasufumi Soejima	August 9, 2013
Nepgear's transformation helps them gain the upper hand for a while until Arfoire use her own transformation. The other three candidates then learn their own transformations and fight together with Nepgear. In the middle of battle the goddesses are swallowed inside the anti-crystal field, causing the candidates to lose hope and turn the tide of battle once again. Just when all hope is lost, once again all four candidates declare the status of the goddesses: POW. Then Nepgear realizes the goddesses are still fighting for their survival inside the now-blackened crystal field, she gathers her resolve alongside Uni, Rom and Ram and proceeds to defeat Arfoire in a team attack. The battle ends with Arfoire's defeat and causes the blackened crystal field to explode from Nepgear's Gunblade. The explosion results in Arfoire becoming injured beyond recovery and losing all attack techniques from the four goddesses. And The splinters from exploding blackened crystal field killed all four goddesses trapped inside instantly. After the battle ends, Nepgear and the other candidates tries to call her sister and the other three goddesses. After not getting a response, she and the other candidates declare all four goddesses: KIA (they Belive that the Goddeses Didn't Survive The Blast). However, when Nepgear hears her sister's voice, she and other three candidates turn their attention to the sky. It turns out the goddesses are alive, and having managed to escape the blackened crystal field. The end shows the four goddesses reunited with the candidates (except Vert who doesn't have a sister). Because they had been captive for so long, the candidates break down into tears and give their big sisters big hugs (Including Nepgear who feel worried, scared and lonely for a long time). The goddesses apologize to their little sisters for leaving them alone for so long (Including Neptune who will always be with Nepgear). Then Nepgear notice Vert is about to break down into tears too so she give her a big hug to make Vert look like her 2nd big sister. Meanwhile, Warechu carries a wounded Arfoire away. The episode ends with Planeptune's shares remaining on a consistent level (despite being in a downward trend). IF tells Compa that despite the other countries losing shares, Vert gained more shares after releasing her augmented reality add-on that the goddesses had tried out 2 episodes prior. Blanc released snack buns called "Blanc Manju" (a parody of blancmange). And that Noire and Uni had defeated so many monsters that they easily gained more shares than they had lost. During a picnic on the hill, Neptune, Nepgear, IF and Compa meet a young girl who appears behind them, and calls the latter two by name.
6	"Lastation's Secret(For Your Eyes Only)"; Transliteration: "Rasuteishon no himitsu(yua aizu onrī)" (Japanese: ラステイションの秘密(ユア・アイズ・オンリー))	Jirō Fujimoto	August 16, 2013
Neptune adopts the young girl, named Peashy. Lastation's security is compromised when an anonymous hacker hacks into their satellite. As the four goddesses gather to discuss how to catch the hacker, Uni consults Nepgear over Noire's recent behavior of locking herself in her room. Nepgear suggests placing a hidden camera inside Noire's room to discover what she's been doing, but finds other hidden cameras already placed there. The four goddesses track the hacker's location down with the help of Setag (a female Bill Gates-esque character), with the candidates also going to the same location by tracing additional hidden cameras that Nepgear had identified due to interference wit hers. The goddesses confront the hacker, a flamboyant man name Anonydeath, who turn out to be a huge fan of Noire. Anonydeath has been taking pictures of Noire using the hidden cameras in her room, which show her cosplaying various characters. Noire attacks Anonydeath in a rage but Anonydeath manages to slip away, only to run into the candidates whom Uni angrily stares down after transforming. Anonydeath gives himself up, leaving an embarrassed Noire begging the candidates to forget everything they saw. Back on Lastation's Basilicom, Noire discuss her cosplay hobby with Uni, only to be hit by a girl falling from the sky. The girl introduces herself as Plutia, the Goddess of Planeptune, much to everyone's surprise.
7	"The Fruit(Deep Purple) of Revenge"; Transliteration: "Fukushū no kajitsu(dīpupāpuru)" (Japanese: 復讐の果実(ディープパープル))	Masashi Abe; Hiroyuki Ōshima	August 23, 2013
Plutia is revealed to be the Goddess of Planeptune from another dimension. During a Dinner Neptune Suddenly Scream and She don't want eggplant in her Dish. A smaller version of Histoire explains Plutia was sent to recover something that was causing energy from Plutia's dimension to flow into Neptune's dimension. As Plutia, Neptune, Nepgear and Peashy get acquainted, Iffy and Compa are kidnapped by Arfoire and Warechu. Neptune, Nepgear and Plutia arrive at an eggplant farm in an attempt to rescue them, but Neptune's hate for eggplants causes her transformation to break, leaving Nepgear alone to fight a horde of eggplant monsters. While IF is getting suggestively tortured by Arfoire, Plutia snaps and transforms into a very sadistic goddess(although was banned when she get angry or being requested by someone), defeating both Arfoire and Warechu (whom had captured Compa due to his infatuation with her). Defeated and having spent all her money on the eggplant farm, Arfoire decides to give up world domination and become a legitimate eggplant farmer, with Warechu helping her.
8	"The Paradise(Island) Forbidden ...on which people will DO THINGS to other people and forget wardrobe malfunction because there might even be some tonguing and it'll be like "Oh no, Neptune is so embarrassed~~"!" Transliteration: "Kindan no rakuen(airando) ……De anna koto ya konna koto yacchattari yararechattari de moshika suruto porori dokoroka perori made aru kamo shirenakute iya~n Neputyūnu hazukashī~ mitai na!" (Japanese: 禁断の楽園(アイランド) ……であんなことやこんなことやっちゃったりやられちゃったりでもしかするとポロリどころかペロリまであるかもしれなくていや〜んネプテューヌ恥ずかしい〜みたいな! ネプテューヌ恥ずかしい〜みたいな!)	Hitomi Ezoe	August 30, 2013
When Satellite discovers an artillery battery on the R-18 Island, the more mature looking goddesses head out to investigate. At the R-18 island, Neptune, Noire, Vert and Nepgear pass through the security checkpoint in their goddess forms with ease, while Blanc in her goddess form had to destroy the checkpoint to gain access, as it was repeatedly asking Blanc and Plutia (in her human form) for confirmation of their age due to their small breast size. The goddesses then decide to take a detour for some naked antics at the beach. When they proceed to the artillery battery, they find the battery appeared to be nothing more than a bubble making machine. The goddesses return to Planeptune, only to find out Peashy returned to her mother, leaving Neptune depressed.
9	"The Challenge(Rebellion) of Eden"; Transliteration: "Edin no chōsen(riberion)" (Japanese: エディンの挑戦(リベリオン))	Yoshinobu Tokumoto	September 6, 2013
While Neptune tries to not think about Peashy by overworking herself, Plutia gets angry at Neptune's attitude and fights her. Just when Neptune is finally honest with herself, they are informed that a new nation, Eden, was formed on the R-18 Island. The goddesses go and find Anonydeath, who reveals that the Anonydeath in Lastation's prison was only his body double. Noire tries to attack Anonydeath, only to be intercepted by the goddess Yellow Heart. Yellow Heart proceeds to fight all the goddesses, while appearing to take no damage herself. Neptune, Noire, Vert and Blanc finally surround Yellow Heart and unleash a barrage of attacks on her, causing her transformation to break. Yellow Heart turns out to be Peashy, to the shock of the goddesses (especially Neptune). Anonydeath and his accomplice Rei Ryghts then declare Peashy as the Goddess of Eden and demand that all the 18+ goods made in Eden are to be exported to other nations in unlimited quantities or there will be war.
10	"The Battlefront(Conflict) of Oblivion"; Transliteration: "Bōkyaku no sensen(konfurikuto)" (Japanese: 忘却の戦線(コンフリクト))	Masayuki Katō	September 13, 2013
Peashy leads Eden's soldiers to invade Planeptune, while IF and Nepgear lead Planeptune soldiers to intercept. Meanwhile riots break out in Lastation, Leanbox and Lowee, preventing the other goddesses from helping Planeptune. Neptune loses the will to fight but is encouraged by Noire and Plutia, which allows her to gather her resolve to confront Peashy. Neptune use a pacifist approach to attack Peashy's memory, while Plutia and Noire, leaving Lastation to Uni, infiltrate Eden. Plutia and Noire successfully destroy Eden's source of power, causing the riot to calm, Eden's soldiers to regain their senses, and Peashy reverting to her human form. Having found Peashy as the one she was looking for, Plutia take Peashy back to their world, with Peashy finally regaining her memory just as they teleport.
11	"The Messenger(Aggressor) From the Ancient Past"; Transliteration: "Inishie kara no shisha(aguressā)" (Japanese: 古からの使者(アグレッサー))	Daisuke Kurose; Masahiro Mukai	September 20, 2013
Planeptune's share had skyrocketed due to stopping Eden's invasion. Neptune plans to hold a festival to celebrate the occasion. Planeptune's rise has cause the other three nation's shares to drop, which made Noire, Vert and Blanc decline the invitation to the festival. Neptune is called to a forest by Blanc, where Blanc suddenly attacks Neptune, accusing Planeptune of stealing her new shares. The attack is stopped by Rom and Ram, but Blanc threatens war. Neptune returns to Planeptune, only to find Rei Ryghts transformed into a goddess and destroyed part of Planeptune to recreate the ancient nation of Tari. Rei destroys Planeptune's Basilicom in a show of power, crippling Planeptune's communication in the process, and preventing any call for help.
12	"The Bonds(Bifrost) to Tomorrow"; Transliteration: "Ashita e no kizuna(bivurosuto)" (Japanese: 明日への絆(ビヴロスト))	Hirofumi Ogura	September 27, 2013
Neptune is overwhelmed by Rei's power until reinforcements from the other three nations arrive. Rei reveals her goal was not to rule the world but to simply destroy it. Explaining that Tari collapsed due to her abusive attitude towards her subjects, which led to The Great Crash. The eight goddesses work together to destroy Tari and her super weapon. Rei is unfazed by the destruction and plans to self-destruct as another means to destroy the world. The eight goddesses surround Rei and join all their Share energy together, ready to sacrifice themselves to stop the destruction. A tremendous blast occurs, but the goddesses are able to contain it. The eight goddesses survive, but are reverted to their human forms. Rei Ryghts also survives, and plans to use her remaining energy to at least kill the eight goddesses. Just as Rei is ready to kill the goddesses, Arfoire arrives and uses the Anti-crystals on Tari's Share crystal, sealing Rei's power and saving the goddesses. Several months later, at a ceremony to celebrate the completion of the new Planeptune Basilicom, Neptune announces the dissolution of the friendship treaty, stating they no longer need it because the goddesses are now true comrades.
13 (OVA)	"The Promised Happily Ever After(True End)"; Transliteration: "Yakusoku no eien(turūendo)" (Japanese: 約束の永遠(トゥルーエンド))	Jirō Fujimoto	March 26, 2014
The little sisters are infected with Bad Ending Syndrome, which causes them to have nightmares. In order to cure it, Neptune and Vert travel to Plutia's dimension to obtain the Shimmering Flowers (Strategy Guidaisy in the dub). At their destination, Neptune is reunited with Plutia and Peashy, and meets the other dimension's Noire, Vert, and Blanc. With the aid of the alternate CPUs, Neptune and Vert ascend a 10000-floor tower, which has the Shimmering Flowers at the top. Neptune ultimately obtains the flowers, but when Peashy is in trouble fighting a monster, Neptune sends Vert back with the flowers and goes to help Peashy, despite being unable to use her goddess transformation in this dimension. Only Vert makes it back to the dimensional gate in time, while Neptune misses the gate and is stuck in Plutia's dimension. However, on the way out of the tower, Neptune fiddles with the transportation device, which accidentally opens another gate between the dimensions, permitting unlimited travel between the two. With the two worlds linked, the goddesses all meet and befriend their counterparts, and Neptune celebrate the occasion with a toast of pudding. The episode fades out with Plutia displaying a large amount of stuffed dolls on a shelf resembling Hyperdimension goddesses and candidates, Iffy, Compa, Mina Nishizawa (Lowee's Oracle), Kei Jinguji (Lastation's Oracle), Chika Hakozaki (Leanbox's Oracle), Histoire (both versions) and the Ultradimension Goddesses.
14 (OVA)	"Neptune's Summer Vacation"; Transliteration: "Shugo Megami(Nepu) no Natsu Yasumi" (Japanese: 守護女神(ねぷ)のなつやすみ)	Masahiro Mukai	July 8, 2019
Bored with work, Neptune takes her friends on a vacation to Summer Mountain. Nepgear gets irritated at Neptune's immaturity. While separated from the CPUs, the little sisters pass through a shrine gate and are transported to another dimension. They are attacked by monsters and find that they cannot use their goddess transformations. They are rescued by an alternate version of Neptune who works as a hunter. She and her companion Croire explain that the shrine gate acts as a portal, but it only opens for a short time at random intervals. As the alternate Neptune teaches them how to survive, Nepgear bonds with her, liking this mature version of her sister, and invites her to come to their dimension. As the CPUs search for their sisters, both groups reach the shrine gate from opposite sides as the portal is about to open, but both groups get attacked by monsters. As the portal opens, Neptune hears Nepgear's voice and as they both touch the portal, Neptune donates energy, allowing Nepgear to transform and make quick work of the monsters on her end. The little sisters jump through the portal back to their own dimension, but the alternate Neptune fails to make it through before it closes. Though disappointed, she says she can just come another time. To end their vacation, Nepgear and Neptune light fireworks together.
15 (OVA)	"Nep-Nep Festival"; Transliteration: "Nepu Nepu Darake no Kansha-sai(Fesutibaru)" (Japanese: ねぷねぷだらけの感謝祭(フェスティバル))	Masahiro Mukai	December 15, 2021
As a festival in Planeptune begins, Neptune is overworked. The alternate Neptune and Croire arrive in Planeptune through a portal, but before they can meet Neptune, she passes out from overwork. She dreams she is on a tropical island with Noire, Vert, and Blanc, who say this is a world of laziness. Neptune was supposed to do a mock-battle performance, so Nepgear goes in her place. The alternate Neptune helps her, using a jetpack to compensate for not having a transformation, and they defeat several monsters, wowing the crowd. Meanwhile, Arfiore is angry that no one will buy her eggplants. In her dream, Neptune is attacked by another version of herself called Neptune GT, who is angry that she is only allowed to come to the island when Neptune works hard. Neptune makes peace with her and wakes up. Learning the festival is already over, she apologizes to Nepgear for making her do her job and goes back to work, making the others think she is still sick due to her uncharacteristic diligence. The alternate Neptune appears with her luggage and she and Neptune finally meet.
16 (OVA)	"Little Purple Sunshine"; Transliteration: "Hidamari no Nasu Hana(Ritoru Pāpuru)" (Japanese: 陽だまりの茄花(リトルパープル))	Masahiro Mukai	July 3, 2022
Arfiore returns to villainy and attacks the CPUs with a monster called Level Trick, but it turns on her and zaps them all, turning Arfiore into a younger woman and the CPUs into children. The CPUs all lose their memories and act like brats. Arfiore takes Neptune back to her eggplant farm and tries to raise her as her successor, but Neptune hates eggplants until she gets the idea to bake them into a pie, which Neptune enjoys. Noire, Vert, and Blanc are looked after by their little sisters, If, Compa, Histoire, and the alternate Neptune. They eventually track Neptune's location and so Nepgear and alternate Neptune head out with a share crystal to restore her powers. Arfoire regrets tricking Neptune into thinking she was her daughter and tries to make her leave, but Level Trick reappears and attacks them. As they draw near, the share crystal jumps out of Nepgear's hands and flies into Neptune, causing her to transform and defeat Level Trick, restoring everyone to their proper ages. Back home, as everyone talks about their experiences, Neptune orders a pizza, but Arfoire, disguised as the delivery person, gives an eggplant pie instead, which Neptune enjoys. After the credits, Uzume Tennouboshi wakes up in the Zero Dimension.
