= Ryū Okuri no Isagi =

Japanese manga series

- First tankōbon volume cover

竜送りのイサギ
- Genre: Drama, historical fantasy
- Manga
- Written by: Makoto Hoshino
- Published by: Shogakukan
- Imprint: Shōnen Sunday Comics Special
- Magazine: Sunday Webry
- Original run: September 3, 2023 – present
- Volumes: 8

Ryū Okuri no Isagi (竜送りのイサギ) is a Japanese manga series written and illustrated by Makoto Hoshino. It began serialization on Shogakukan's Sunday Webry manga website in September 2023.

== Synopsis ==
Set in Himuka, a land where dragons are revered, Isagi is a boy who lives in a penal colony where he works as an executioner. Isagi has an ability that allows him to see the memories of criminals he has been appointed to execute. One day, he meets a man named Tatsunami, who has been training Isagi with his swordsmanship. Later, Isagi is appointed to execute Tatsunami, and when he takes a look into his mind he discovers that Tatsunami slayed a dragon. After Tatsunami's execution, his son Chienami reaches out to Isagi and guides him on a path to discover Tatsunami's motive.

== Publication ==
Written and illustrated by Makoto Hoshino, Ryū Okuri no Isagi began serialization on Shogakukan's Sunday Webry manga website on September 3, 2023. Its chapters have been compiled into eight tankōbon volumes as of September 2026.

No.	Release date	ISBN
1	January 12, 2024	978-4-09-853081-6
2	May 10, 2024	978-4-09-853308-4
3	September 11, 2024	978-4-09-853565-1
4	February 12, 2025	978-4-09-853847-8
5	July 11, 2025	978-4-09-854170-6
6	December 12, 2025	978-4-09-854365-6
7	May 12, 2026	978-4-09-854576-6
8	September 11, 2026	978-4-09-854803-3

== Reception ==
The series was nominated for the tenth Next Manga Awards in the web category in 2024. The series was ranked twelfth in the eleventh edition in 2025. The series won the grand prize in the Men's Division of the 2025 Renta Manga Awards.

== See also ==
- The Tale of the Outcasts, another manga series by the same author
