= Alya Sometimes Hides Her Feelings in Russian =

Japanese light novel series and its adaptations

- First light novel volume cover, featuring Alya

時々ボソッとロシア語でデレる隣のアーリャさん (Tokidoki Bosotto Roshiago de Dereru Tonari no Ārya-san)
- Genre: Romantic comedy
- Created by: SunSunSun
- Novel series
- Written by: SunSunSun
- Published by: Shōsetsuka ni Narō (self-published)
- Original run: May 6, 2020 – May 27, 2020
- Light novel
- Written by: SunSunSun
- Illustrated by: Momoco
- Published by: Kadokawa Shoten
- English publisher: NA: Yen Press
- Imprint: Kadokawa Sneaker Bunko
- Original run: February 27, 2021 – present
- Volumes: 12 (Note: Plus two short story collection)
- Manga
- Written by: SunSunSun
- Illustrated by: Saho Tenamachi
- Published by: Kodansha
- English publisher: NA: Yen Press
- Magazine: Magazine Pocket
- Original run: October 29, 2022 – present
- Volumes: 10
- Anime television series
- Directed by: Ryota Itoh (S1); Hiroshi Haraguchi (S2)
- Produced by: Ryō Kobayashi
- Written by: Ryota Itoh (S1); Yuka Yamada (S2)
- Music by: Hiroaki Tsutsumi
- Studio: Doga Kobo
- Licensed by: Crunchyroll (Note: In North America through Crunchyroll, LLC.); SA/SEA: Medialink
- Original network: Tokyo MX, BS NTV, SUN, KBS Kyoto, Mētele, HTB, RKB, TSS, Miyatere, TV Shizuoka, BSN, UTY, TUF, itv, NBC, IBC, TUT, MRO, FTB, TUY, RBC, KKB, AT-X
- Original run: July 3, 2024 – present
- Episodes: 12
- icon

Alya Sometimes Hides Her Feelings in Russian (Note: Japanese: 時々ボソッとロシア語でデレる隣のアーリャさん, Hepburn: Tokidoki Bosotto Roshiago de Dereru Tonari no Ārya-san; lit. Alya, Who Sits Next to Me, Sometimes Whispers Sweet Nothings in Russian) is a Japanese light novel series written by SunSunSun and illustrated by Momoco. It was originally published online as two short stories on the novel publishing website Shōsetsuka ni Narō on May 6 and 27, 2020, respectively, before being acquired by Kadokawa Shoten, who have published the series since February 2021 under their Sneaker Bunko imprint.

The story follows a beautiful and talented young Russo-Japanese woman named Alisa Kujou who is a transfer student at her new high school in Japan. The story also follows a brilliant, yet lazy male student named Masachika Kuze.

A manga adaptation by Saho Tenamachi began serialization online in Kodansha's Magazine Pocket app and website in October 2022.

An anime television series adaptation produced by Doga Kobo aired from July to September 2024. A second season is set to premiere in 2027.

By August 2024, the light novel series had over five million copies in circulation.

== Premise ==
Alisa Mikhailovna Kujou, nicknamed Alya, is a female high school student with silver hair who looks so beautiful that she turns heads wherever she goes, but her aloof demeanor makes people around her feel uneasy. Masachika Kuze, who sits next to Alya, is an unmotivated student who just stays up late at night and is a sleepyhead at school. Alya often complains about Masachika but seems to be secretly in love with him, and occasionally makes flirtatious remarks in Russian. However, she does not realize that Masachika also harbours a secret crush for her and understands Russian, and her flirty comments towards him constantly leave him perplexed and flustered.

As their friendship blossoms, Alya eventually chooses to run for Student Council with Masachika eventually choosing to be her running mate. Their quest to be elected soon begins to unravel their mutual pasts, including their respective complicated family histories and the real reason as to why Masachika can understand Russian.

== Characters ==
=== Seirei Private Academy ===
==== Student Council ====
Alisa Mikhailovna Kujou (アリサ・ミハイロヴナ・九条, Arisa Mihairovuna Kujō; Russian: Алиса Михайловна Кудзё) / Alya (アーリャ, Ārya; Russian: Аля)
Voiced by: Sumire Uesaka (drama CD, voice comic, PV, anime) (Japanese); Sarah Natochenny (English)
Alya is a beautiful and talented first-year student who is known for her looks and cold attitude. She was born to a Russian father and a Japanese mother. She occasionally makes remarks in Russian, which confuses her teacher and classmates. Though many students envy her because of her cold demeanor, Alya does not have many friends and is not very experienced at social interaction. That slowly changes the more she spends time with her classmate Masachika. She disapproves of Masachika's lack of motivation, but at the same time, she is in love with him, and constantly flirts with him in Russian. Alya is Masha's younger sister. She spent her childhood in Vladivostok, Russia, where she had difficulties making friends. Alya is the Student Council Treasurer, and is running to be the next Student Council President, with Masachika as her running mate.
Her cold attitude could be rooted to her experiences in Vladivostok when during one time, her groupmates were too lazy to work on a project. Her groupmates, however, then quarrelled with Alya since she was working too hard. The project work later came as a failure, so she decided to work hard on her own and avoid working with others, leading to her cold attitude.
Alya likes to eat sweet food, and is afraid of eating spicy food.
Masachika Kuze (久世 政近, Kuze Masachika)
Voiced by: Kōhei Amasaki (drama CD, voice comic, PV, anime) (Japanese); Aaron Dismuke, Erin Lundquist (young) (English)
Masachika Kuze holds a position in high school envied by many boys: the seat next to Alya. He is a slacking sleepyhead who tends to stay up late most nights and lacks motivation in class. Whenever Alya makes remarks in Russian, Masachika pretends not to understand her, but he secretly does. He learned Russian only so to speak to a female childhood friend who only understood Russian, although she later moves away. It is later revealed that Masachika was originally the heir of the Suou family. He later renounced the position after his parents divorced and he left with his father. His younger sister Yuki subsequently inherited the position. He was allowed to leave the Suou household on the condition that he could never disclose his connection with the household or that anyone from the household was his relative, including his own biological sister Yuki Suou, and his mother Yumi Suou as well. He has a crush on Alya and is always willing to help in any way he can, but deems himself unworthy for her. As of the recent volume of the light novel, Masachika and Alya still refuse to openly confess their feelings to each other.
Back in the days when his surname was still Suou, he was considered the prodigy of the Suou house. Therefore, he received elite education from his maternal grandfather Gensei. He was also a skilled piano player. Yet, as Yuki got asthma and his mother Yumi ignored him, Masachika felt more stressed and eventually collapsed. After his parents' divorce, he followed his father Kyoutarou Kuze and left the Suou family. Following this, Masachika is revealed to act lazy, only to cause others not to depend on him, obviously due to his past experience.
He loves his little sister Yuki, treating her as the most important person in existence.
After being heavily persuaded by others, Masachika decides to join the Student Council General Affairs Officer, and eventually decides to run for Vice-President in the election as Alya's running mate.
Yuki Suou (周防 有希, Suō Yuki)
Voiced by: Wakana Maruoka (anime) (Japanese); Reshel Mae (English)
A first-year who serves as the Student Council Public Relations who is one of the most popular students in school. She is Masachika's younger sister who serves as the daughter of the Suou house, whose origin was a former noble family and has shouldered the role of a diplomat for generations, becoming the heir after her father Kyoutarou Kuze and older brother Masachika Kuze left the family. She is a genuine, beautiful and straightforward girl, and enjoys teasing Alya over her romantic feelings for Masachika, as Yuki's relation with him is not public knowledge. She and Alya are rivals, and she occasionally torments Alya for her performance to attend the Student Council. She has a follower, Ayano Kimishima, who becomes her running mate when she runs for Student Council President as Alya's challenger.
She and Masachika are forced to hide their true relations in public by pretending to be childhood friends. Whenever only Masachika and/or Ayano are around, she displays another face: Otaku and cuteness. She sometimes makes sexual remarks due to her otaku nature. She often comes to Masachika's home to stay overnight.
She used to have asthma when she was small, but claims that she has recovered and has never caught a cold since middle school.
Maria Mikhailovna Kujou (マリヤ・ミハイロヴナ・九条, Mariya Mihairovuna Kujō; Russian: Мария Михайловна Кудзё) / Masha (マーシャ, Māsha; Russian: Маша)
Voiced by: Yukiyo Fujii (anime) (Japanese); Jill Harris (English)
Alya's older sister, a second-year and the Student Council Secretary. She has a sweet and gentle personality, and is always caring of these around her, especially Alya and Masachika. She has similar looks as her little sister.
She likes to make black tea for herself and other Student Council members. She also likes cute things, once attempting to buy several dolls to be put inside the Student Council room.
She is Masachika's childhood friend and first love. They used to play together when they were young, and he became sad when she moved away. Because Masha's Japanese was not as fluent as her Russian, his knowledge of Russian allowed them to form a bond.
Ayano Kimishima (君嶋 綾乃, Kimishima Ayano)
Voiced by: Saya Aizawa (anime) (Japanese); Rebecca Danae (English)
She is a maid of Yuki, who is naturally silent and expressionless. She is a Student Council General Affairs Officer. She was formerly a maid for Masachika, but after Masachika relinquished his position as the heir of the Suou household, she became a follower of his younger sister, Yuki, when Yuki was chosen to become the heiress of the Suou household due to Masachika's decision to give up that role.
She is a masochist and respectfully loves Masachika and Yuki. Moreover, she is sweet and cares for others a lot.
She keeps a low profile at school. When she speaks on stage during the End of Year Service, most schoolmates do not know who she is, and are surprised by her beauty.
She is running for Vice-President as Yuki's running mate.
Chisaki Sarashina (更科 茅咲, Sarashina Chisaki)
Voiced by: Maki Kawase (anime) (Japanese); Mikaela Krantz (English)
The Student Council Vice-President and a second-year student at the high school. She is feared by some male students, but is extremely popular among female students. She is currently dating the student council president, Touya Kenzaki. Her hobby is kendo. She is bad at paperwork, but is good at dealing with quarrels, especially by means of threat.
Touya Kenzaki (剣崎 統也, Kenzaki Tōya)
Voiced by: Kaito Ishikawa (anime) (Japanese); Aaron Campbell (English)
A second-year student and Chisaki's boyfriend, he is the charismatic Student Council President of the high school section. He used to be obese and have bad grades back when he was in the middle school section, but changed himself in order to win Chisaki's heart, whom he had always been in love with.

==== Other students ====
Sayaka Taniyama (谷山 沙也加, Taniyama Sayaka)
Voiced by: Ikumi Hasegawa (anime) (Japanese); Izzi Raine (English)
A loyal but stoic girl who competed with Yuki for the position of Student Council resident in the middle school and currently is a public morals committee member. She once looked up to Masachika and Yuki for their teamwork and mutual honesty, but was left crushed when she found out Masachika decided to partner with Alya for the upcoming student council elections against Yuki. Nevertheless, she reluctantly decides to become their subordinate along with her closest friend Nonoa Miyamae. She eventually warms up to Alya as they work together, and they both become close friends.
Nonoa Miyamae (宮前 乃々亜, Miyamae Nonoa)
Voiced by: Yoshino Aoyama (anime) (Japanese); Sarah Wiedenheft (English)
A first-year high school student and Sayaka's best friend. She has blond hair with a loose perm.
She cannot feel other people's emotions, only acknowledge them, so she only acts as what others would like to see for her benefit. Moreover, she is able to analyze things around her rationally.
She planted several shills during the Student Congress in order to place Alya at a disadvantage, but eventually decided to stop and partner up with Alya and Masachika, alongside Sayaka.
Takeshi Maruyama (丸山 毅, Maruyama Takeshi)
Voiced by: Kōdai Sakai (anime) (Japanese); Corey Wilder (English)
One of Masachika's best male friends who has a crush on Yuki Suou.
Hikaru Kiyomiya (清宮 光瑠, Kiyomiya Hikaru)
Voiced by: Taichi Ichikawa (anime) (Japanese); Joshua Waters (English)
One of Masachika's male best friends.

== Media ==
=== Web novel ===
Before the light novel's publication, two short stories were published on Shōsetsuka ni Narō on May 6 and 27, 2020. However, the stories and characters in the web version are completely different from the published novel.

In an interview with Japanese magazine Da Vinci in 2021, SunSunSun told that he initially wanted the series to take place in an isekai setting where the heroine gets transported to another world where no one could understand the Japanese language, except for the protagonist who was planned to be reincarnated as well. The idea was scrapped since he felt that it would be troublesome to explain the new environment, so he went with a real-world setting instead. Regarding Alya's half-Russian heritage, the author stated that he was influenced by the beauty of Russian women.

=== Light novel ===
The light novel series is written by SunSunSun and illustrated by Momoco. In June 2020, SunSunSun first received an invitation from Kadokawa Sneaker Bunko for whether the imprint could publish the work. On December 22, 2020, it was announced the short stories published on Shōsetsuka ni Narō would be published by Kadokawa Shoten under their Kadokawa Sneaker Bunko imprint after being adapted as a series. The title of the series follows the title of one of the two short stories. The first volume was published on February 27, 2021. As of November 2025, eleven volumes and two short story volumes have been released.

At Sakura-Con 2022, Yen Press announced that they licensed the series for English publication.

No.	Original release date	Original ISBN	English release date	English ISBN
1	February 27, 2021	978-4-04-111118-5	November 22, 2022	978-1-9753-4784-0
Prologue: The Solitary Princess and Her Lazy Neighbor; Chapter 1: Who wouldn't be frustrated if they missed the free daily character summon?; Chapter 2: I have friends, you know?; Chapter 3: Yes, Officer. This man right here.; Chapter 4: What's wrong with a little sisterly love?; Chapter 5: Please don't fight over me!; Chapter 6: This is the first time I have ever seen the shadow of death.; Chapter 7: That was quite the tragedy, wasn't it?; Chapter 8: I understand.; Epilogue: Take My Hand
2	July 30, 2021	978-4-04-111119-2	February 21, 2023	978-1-9753-4786-4
Prologue: You've got it wrong!; Chapter 1: Do you get it now?; Chapter 2: Balls are the enemy, and that's final.; Chapter 3: Could I have seconds?; Chapter 4: I could only taste the cream. I'm serious.; Chapter 5: The bigger the better.; Chapter 6: What all nerds want to do at least once in their life.; Chapter 7: It's a promise; Chapter 8: Ideals and Reality; Epilogue: A Reason
3	December 1, 2021	978-4-04-111955-6	May 23, 2023	978-1-9753-6757-2
Prologue: Suou; Chapter 1: Two rom-coms in one.; Chapter 2: Fear the reset.; Chapter 3: Still not in the mood to clean.; Chapter 4: I-it's a cultural difference...; Chapter 5: Blinding for more than one reason.; Chapter 6: Hot for more than one reason.; Chapter 7: Apparently, it's sort of like Ishikawa's 5M method.; Chapter 8: A Greeting; Epilogue: Chin Up
4	April 1, 2022	978-4-04-111956-3	October 17, 2023	978-1-9753-6759-6
Prologue: A Past Best Forgotten; Chapter 1: Do stomach fetishes even exist?; Chapter 2: Otaku are so annoying.; Chapter 3: Wait. Seriously?; Chapter 4: Uh, are you pulling my leg?; Chapter 5: That was no wrestling.; Chapter 6: I want to be a turtle.; Chapter 7: They were floating, man.; Chapter 8: It's some kind of (sleeping) prank?; Chapter 9: You're calling me a tyrant?; Chapter 10: Feelings of Love; Epilogue: A Past That Mustn't Be Forgotten
4.5	July 29, 2022	978-4-04-112780-3	March 19, 2024	978-1-9753-6761-9
Chapter 1: GL and BL; Chapter 2: A Princess and a God; Chapter 3: Atmosphere and Appetite; Chapter 4: Brother Complex, Sister Complex; Chapter 5: Ideals and Reality; Chapter 6: A Storeroom and a Locked Room; Chapter 7: Stargazing and a Scolding; Chapter 8: Beauty and the Bonehead; Chapter 9: Adoration and Arrogance; Chapter 10: A Ditz and a Pro; Chapter 11: A Meal and a Mystery; Chapter 12: My Love, My Lord; Chapter 13: Masachika and Alya
5	December 1, 2022	978-4-04-112781-0	August 20, 2024	978-1-9753-8950-5
Prologue: Encounter; Chapter 1: A Reunion and a Farewell; Chapter 2: Maybe dreams aren't always meant to come true.; Chapter 3: What were you planning on doing with my armpit?; Chapter 4: Who wants to see a guy blush?; Chapter 5: Hiding Feelings in Russian, AKA the Verbal Exhibitions; Chapter 6: I'm innocent! I swear!; Chapter 7: Guilty. Straight to jail.; Chapter 8: Seriously. Who wants to see a guy blushing and stuff?!; Chapter 9: Aren't these guys too strong?; Chapter 10: Pride and Stubbornness; Chapter 11: And the winner is...?; Epilogue: Pledge
6	April 1, 2023	978-4-04-113544-0	December 10, 2024	978-1-9753-8952-9
Prologue: My Wizard; Chapter 1: They're getting a little too into it.; Chapter 2: All nerds dream of doing a chi blast.; Chapter 3: I haven't argued this passionately since the debate.; Chapter 4: Honestly, it was tempting.; Chapter 5: In a way, I actually do feel better.; Chapter 6: Combat power is what's really important.; Chapter 7: Violence is always the answer.; Chapter 8: If you can't beat'em, break'em.; Chapter 9: I will keep my promise.; Chapter 10: Saying thank you and good-bye to first love.; Epilogue: At least for now.; Bonus Story: The Day Professor Side Slit Was Born; The Short Story After the Afterword: Yuri will save the world.
7	September 1, 2023	978-4-04-114062-8	May 13, 2025	979-8-8554-0705-1
Prologue: Woah. Hey now...; Chapter 1: Reunion; Chapter 2: Would rather not have this foreshadowing.; Chapter 3: Wait, am I stupid?; Chapter 4: The most colossal backfire of the century.; Chapter 5: Be proud of your fake persona.; Chapter 6: A girl bad for the heart, a girl good for the heart.; Chapter 7: At least it was probably an accident.; Chapter 8: My, have you grown.; Chapter 9: Encounter; Chapter 10: The Run; Epilogue: So this is...; Side Story: When she was but a childhood friend.
8	February 1, 2024	978-4-04-114592-0	November 11, 2025	979-8-8554-0707-5
Prologue: Secret; Chapter 1: First Love; Chapter 2: A Lie; Chapter 3: Purity; Chapter 4: Revelation; Chapter 5: Chaos; Chapter 6: Cards; Chapter 7: Music; Chapter 8: Connection; Chapter 9: Celebration; Chapter 10: Confession; Epilogue: Repentance
9	August 30, 2024	978-4-04-114831-0	April 14, 2026	979-8-8554-2305-1
Prologue: But Yuki was still a child.; Chapter 1: And then, it all came down to thighs.; Chapter 2: And then, the mother and her child locked eyes.; Chapter 3: And in the end, I was still a nobody.; Chapter 4: And then, Masachika made his decision.; Chapter 5: And then, the pretense became the real thing.; Chapter 6: And then, Alisa peacefully passed away.; Chapter 7: And then, the culprit was exposed.; Chapter 8: And then, the see had been sown.; Chapter 9: And then, they faced each other.; Epilogue: And that's how I became me.
9.5	November 29, 2024	978-4-04-115742-8	October 13, 2026	979-8-8554-2453-9
10	July 1, 2025	978-4-04-116155-5	—	—
11	November 29, 2025	978-4-04-116837-0	—	—
12	October 1, 2026	978-4-04-117791-4	—	—

=== Manga ===
A manga adaptation with art by Saho Tenamachi began serialization in Kodansha's Magazine Pocket app and website on October 29, 2022. The first tankōbon volume was released on March 9, 2023. The series is published in English on Kodansha's "K Manga" app. On December 16, 2024, Yen Press announced that they also licensed the manga for English print publication.

No.	Original release date	Original ISBN	English release date	English ISBN
1	March 9, 2023	978-4-06-531091-5	June 24, 2025	979-8-8554-1379-3
Chapter 1: The Solitary Princess and Her Lazy Neighbor; Chapter 2: Who Wouldn't Be Frustrated if They Missed the Free Daily Gacha Pull?; Chapter 3: I Have Friends, You Know? Part I; Chapter 4: I Have Friends, You Know? Part II; Chapter 5: I Have Friends, You Know? Part III; Chapter 6: Yes, Officer. This Guy Right Here. Part I; Chapter 7: Yes, Officer. This Guy Right Here. Part II; Chapter 8: What's Wrong With a Little Sisterly Love? Part I; Chapter 9: What's Wrong With a Little Sisterly Love? Part II
2	June 8, 2023	978-4-06-531880-5	September 23, 2025	979-8-8554-1381-6
Chapter 10: What's Wrong With a Little Sisterly Love? Part III; Chapter 11: What's Wrong With a Little Sisterly Love? Part IV; Chapter 12: What's Wrong With a Little Sisterly Love? Part V; Chapter 13: What's Wrong With a Little Sisterly Love? Part VI; Chapter 14: What's Wrong With a Little Sisterly Love? Part VII; Chapter 15: What's Wrong With a Little Sisterly Love? Part VIII; Chapter 16: Please Don't Fight Over Me! Part I; Chapter 17: Please Don't Fight Over Me! Part II
3	November 9, 2023	978-4-06-533550-5	April 28, 2026	979-8-8554-1383-0
Chapter 18: Please Don't Fight Over Me! Part III; Chapter 19: Please Don't Fight Over Me! Part IV; Chapter 20: This Is the First Time I Have Ever Seen the Shadow of Death Part I; Chapter 21: This Is the First Time I Have Ever Seen the Shadow of Death Part II; Chapter 22: This Is the First Time I Have Ever Seen the Shadow of Death Part III; Chapter 23: This Is the First Time I Have Ever Seen the Shadow of Death Part IV; Chapter 24: That Was Quite the Tragedy, Wasn't It? Part I; Chapter 25: That Was Quite the Tragedy, Wasn't It? Part II
4	April 9, 2024	978-4-06-535169-7	January 26, 2027	979-8-8554-2487-4
5	August 7, 2024	978-4-06-536510-6	—	—
6	January 8, 2025	978-4-06-538068-0	—	—
7	June 9, 2025	978-4-06-539753-4	—	—
8	November 7, 2025	978-4-06-541536-8	—	—
9	April 9, 2026	978-4-06-543316-4	—	—
10	September 9, 2026	978-4-06-544959-2	—	—

=== Anime ===
An anime television series adaptation was announced in March 2023. It is produced by Doga Kobo, with series direction and screenplay by Ryota Itoh, character designs handled by Yūhei Murota who also serves as chief animation director, and music composition by Hiroaki Tsutsumi. Ryō Kobayashi serves as a producer. The anime series was originally scheduled for April 2024, but was later delayed, and eventually aired from July 3 to September 18, 2024, on Tokyo MX and various other networks. The opening theme song is "Ichiban Kagayaku Hoshi" (1番輝く星; "The Brightest Star"), while each episode features a different ending theme song which are covers of pre-existing Japanese songs, all performed by Sumire Uesaka as her character Alya. Kadokawa Corporation compiled the episodes into three Blu-ray and DVD sets, which were released from September 25 to November 27, 2024.

Crunchyroll licensed the series for worldwide streaming. The first season was released on Blu-ray on July 22, 2025. Medialink licensed the series in Southeast Asia, South Asia, and Oceania (except Australia and New Zealand).

Upon the conclusion of the first season finale, a second season was announced. Hiroshi Haraguchi will direct the season, with Yuka Yamada serving as the scriptwriter, and Yūhei Murota returning as the character designer. It was originally set to premiere in 2026; however, it was later delayed to 2027 to further improve the quality of the series.

=== Audiobooks ===
An audiobook adaptation based on the light novel series was first produced and published in Japanese with Sumire Uesaka and Kōhei Amasaki voicing the main characters Alya Mikhailovna Kujou and Masachika Kuze, respectively.

In March 2024, Yen Audio, a subsidiary of Yen Press, announced to produce an English-language audiobook based on the light novels. The first audiobook was published on August 13, 2024, with Taylor Meskimen as narrator.

=== Smartphone game ===
On July 17, 2024, the production of a smartphone game titled Alya Sometimes Hides Her Feelings in Russian: Puzzle Party! (時々ボソッとロシア語でデレる隣のアーリャさん パズルパーティ！, Tokidoki Bosotto Roshiago de Dereru Tonari no Ārya-san Pazuru Pāti!) for Android and iOS devices was announced and the pre-registration phase started. Developed by Poppin Games Japan, the puzzle game was released on September 19, 2024.

=== Other ===
A VTuber model of Alya debuted in July 2021 to promote the release of the second light novel volume.

Kadokawa released an art book titled Alya Sometimes Hides Her Feelings in Russian: Momoco's Art Book (時々ボソッとロシア語でデレる隣のアーリャさん ももこ画集) (ISBN 978-4-04-114832-7) on June 28, 2024. Yen Press published an English print of the book on December 16, 2025 (ISBN 979-8-8554-2073-9).

== Reception ==
Alya Sometimes Hides Her Feelings in Russian ranked ninth in the 2022 edition of Takarajimasha's annual light novel guide book Kono Light Novel ga Sugoi! in the bunkobon category, and fifth overall among the other new series of that year. It also ranked fifth in the bunkobon category of the 2023 edition, and third in the 2024 and 2025 editions. At the 2021 Next Light Novel Awards, the series placed first in the Librarian's Choice category. It also ranked second in the Web Publication category, and ninth in the overall category. By April 2022, the series has 500,000 copies in circulation. In August 2024, it has reported that the series became the first to reach five million copies in the history of Kadokawa Shoten's Sneaker Bunko imprint's romantic comedy stories.

According to Kadokawa Corporation, Alya Sometimes Hides Her Feelings in Russian was the fifth most successful franchise of the company in the second quarter of the fiscal year 2024. The company stated that the franchise managed to accumulate around 1 billion yen in revenue based on manga and light novel licensing, manga and light novel sales as well as streaming revenue for the anime series.

The first season of the anime series won Slice of Life Anime of the Year and Supporting Girl of the Year (Yuki Suou) while receiving eight other nominations, including Anime of the Year at the 11th Anime Trending Awards. Alisa "Alya" Mikhailovna Kujou's voice actor Sarah Natochenny was nominated for Best Voice Artist Performance (English) at the 9th Crunchyroll Anime Awards in 2025.
