= SunSunSun =

Japanese novelist (born 1993)

SunSunSun 燦々SUN
- Born: October 8, 1993 (age 33) Japan
- Area: Novelist
- Notable works: Alya Sometimes Hides Her Feelings in Russian

SunSunSun (燦々SUN, SunSunSun; born October 8, 1993) is a Japanese novelist. They are best known as the creator of the hit light novel series Alya Sometimes Hides Her Feelings in Russian.

== Overview ==
Originally, they were active on the novel posting site Shōsetsuka ni Narō ("Let's Become a Novelist"), primarily focusing on short stories. Inspired by other novels on the site, they posted their first novel around October 2017.

Their writing led to them being contacted by a representative of Kadokawa Sneaker Bunko, who wanted to serialize one of their short stories. This would become Alya Sometimes Hides Her Feelings in Russian, their publishing debut. According to Kadokawa, its first volume was their highest-sold new paperback light novel from April 4, 2020 to March 31, 2021, their most downloaded romantic comedy e-book at release from September 1, 2019 to March 31, 2021, and their best-selling light novel of 2021.

When asked about authors and works that influenced them, they mentioned Accel World by Reki Kawahara, the first light novel they ever purchased, particularly noting Kawahara's influence on their detailed character portrayals and how they approach psychological descriptions. As for works they consider masterpieces, they pointed to Fullmetal Alchemist and Attack on Titan. On the other hand, they mentioned that they do not typically read science fiction.

== Works ==
- Alya Sometimes Hides Her Feelings in Russian (illustrated by Momoco, published by Kadokawa Sneaker Bunko, 11 volumes and 2 short story volumes, 2021–present)

== See also ==
- List of Japanese writers: S
