= Momoco =

Japanese illustrator

- ももこ
- Born: January 25; Hokkaido, Japan
- Occupation: Illustrator
- Known for: Alya Sometimes Hides Her Feelings in Russian

Momoco (ももこ, Momoco; born January 25) is a Japanese illustrator from Hokkaido. She is the leader of the doujin group Sashimi Neko-ya (さしみねこ屋).

Her first solo exhibition espressivo was held from October 4 to October 23, 2019 at the pixiv WAEN GALLERY on Omotesando. She had another solo exhibition in Taiwan from January 18 to February 23, 2020.

On May 30, 2020, she released an art book titled Momoko Gashū Arietta (ももこ画集 arietta; Momoka Art Book Arietta) published by Genkosha. The art book contains 230 illustrations, including original works, commercial pieces, and fan creations.

She ranked 10th in the illustrator category of Kono Light Novel ga Sugoi! 2022 published by Takarajimasha.

== Works List ==
=== Illustrations ===
==== Light Novels ====
- Akugyaku Kishidan: Sono Elf, Kyōbō ni Tsuki (悪逆騎士団 そのエルフ、凶暴につき) by Hazuki Minase
- Problem Children Are Coming from Another World, Aren't They? by Taro Ryunoko
- Alya Sometimes Hides Her Feelings in Russian by SunSunSun
- Oshieko ni Kyōsaku Sareru no wa Hanzai desu ka? (教え子に脅迫されるのは犯罪ですか?) by Sagara Sou
- Junpaku to Ōgon (純白と黄金) by Junpaku Natsume, character design by Ratan

=== Character Designs ===
==== Games ====
- Bullet Girls Fantasia
- Kanpani☆Girls – Nomado A. Nihiru, among others

==== Virtual YouTubers ====
- NIJISANJI EN – Petra Gurin
- Hololive – Koyori Hakui
- NIJISANJI – Rika Igarashi
- 774 Inc – Yuge Anzu (New Visual)
