= Hiroaki Tsutsumi =

Japanese musical artist (born 1985)

Hiroaki Tsutsumi 堤博明
- Born: June 5, 1985 (age 41); Tokyo
- Genres: Film score; Soundtrack
- Occupations: Composer; Arranger
- Instruments: Guitar
- Label: Miracle Bus

Hiroaki Tsutsumi (Japanese: 堤 博明, Hepburn: Tsutsumi Hiroaki; born June 5, 1985) is a Japanese musician and composer best known for his work on various anime television series. He started his musical career at the age of 14 when he first started playing the guitar. After winning a guitar contest three years later, he decided to become a professional musician and later graduated from Kunitachi College of Music.

In 2013, he was given the role of lead composer for the first time with Hyperdimension Neptunia: The Animation. Since Hyperdimension Neptunia: The Animation, he has composed many series, including Dr. Stone, Jujutsu Kaisen, and Teasing Master Takagi-san.

== Biography ==
Hiroaki Tsutsumi was born in Tokyo on June 5, 1985, and began his musical career when he first started playing the guitar at the age of 14 after many of his peers started playing the instrument themselves. At the age of 17, he won a guitar contest, which became the reason he decided to become a professional musician. After practicing under guidance from Yoshihisa Suzuki and graduating from high school, he attended and later graduated from Kunitachi College of Music.

Before graduating, Tsutsumi worked a bit with Masaru Yokoyama, who influenced Tsutsumi to try composing for other works. In 2013, Tsutsumi was put in charge of composing for the first time with the anime television series for the Hyperdimension Neptunia media franchise. In 2020, the anime adaptation of Dr. Stone was nominated for Best Score at the 4th Crunchyroll Anime Awards, which Tsutsumi co-composed. In 2021, Jujutsu Kaisen won Anime of the Year at the 5th Crunchyroll Anime Awards, which Tsutsumi also co-composed.

== Works ==
=== TV series ===
- Hyperdimension Neptunia: The Animation (2013) (composer with Kenji Kaneko and Masaru Yokoyama)
- I Couldn't Become a Hero, So I Reluctantly Decided to Get a Job (2013) (composer with Masaru Yokoyama)
- Meganebu! (2013) (composer with Keiko Osaki and Shota Hashimoto)
- Blue Spring Ride (2014) (composer with Keiko Osaki and Shota Hashimoto)
- Monster Musume (2015) (composer)
- Lance N' Masques (2015) (composer)
- Valkyrie Drive: Mermaid (2015) (composer)
- Kuromukuro (2016) (composer)
- Orange (2016) (composer)
- Long Riders! (2016–2017) (composer)
- Akashic Records of Bastard Magic Instructor (2017) (composer)
- Seven Mortal Sins (2017) (composer with Masaru Yokoyama)
- Clean Freak! Aoyama-kun (2017) (composer)
- Children of the Whales (2017) (composer)
- Teasing Master Takagi-san (2018–2022) (composer)
- Anima Yell! (2018) (composer with manzo)
- Ao-chan Can't Study! (2019) (composer)
- Dr. Stone (2019–present) (composer with Tatsuya Kato and Yuki Kanesaka)
- Ahiru no Sora (2019–2020) (composer)
- Actors: Songs Connection (2019) (composer with Hideakira Kimura and Tomotaka Ōsumi)
- Jujutsu Kaisen (2020–2021) (composer with Yoshimasa Terui and Alisa Okehazama)
- By the Grace of the Gods (2020–present) (composer)
- Koikimo (2021) (composer)
- Tokyo Revengers (2021–2023) (composer)
- My Senpai Is Annoying (2021) (composer)
- Shikimori's Not Just a Cutie (2022) (composer)
- The Tale of the Outcasts (2023) (composer with Kana Hashiguchi)
- I Shall Survive Using Potions! (2023) (composer)
- Bartender: Glass of God (2024) (composer)
- Alya Sometimes Hides Her Feelings in Russian (2024) (composer)
- 2.5 Dimensional Seduction (2024) (composer)
- Omusubi (2024–2025) (composer)
- Scooped Up by an S-Rank Adventurer! (2025) (composer with Tsubasa Handa)
- Snowball Earth (2026) (composer with Tatsuya Kato and Yuki Kanesaka)
- Draw This, Then Die! (2026) (composer)
- Gacha Girls Corps (2027) (composer with George King)

=== Films ===
- Jujutsu Kaisen 0 (2021) (composer with Yoshimasa Terui and Alisa Okehazama)
- Teasing Master Takagi-san: The Movie (2022) (composer)
- 100 Meters (2025) (composer)
- Mieruko-chan (2025) (composer)

=== Original net animation ===
- Monster Strike the Animation (2018) (composer with Masaru Yokoyama, Nobuaki Nobusawa, and Moe Hyūga)
- Monsters: 103 Mercies Dragon Damnation (2024) (composer)
- Bullet/Bullet (2025) (composer)

=== Original video animation ===
- Alice in Borderland (2014–2015) (composer)

=== Albums ===
- Some Dreams (2018) (guitar playing)
