= List of Gargoyle of Yoshinaga House media =

Gargoyle of Yoshinaga House is a Japanese light novel series written by Sennendō Taguchi and illustrated by Yuji Himukai.

The main story consists of 15 volumes published between January 2004 and July 2008 by Famitsu Bunko.

== Light novel ==
No.	Japanese release date	Japanese ISBN
1	January 23, 2004	978-4-7577-1701-5
2	March 19, 2004	978-4-7577-1788-6
3	May 22, 2004	978-4-7577-1871-5
4	August 23, 2004	978-4-7577-1967-5
5	October 20, 2004	978-4-7577-2033-6
6	January 20, 2005	978-4-7577-2133-3
7	April 20, 2005	978-4-7577-2251-4
8	October 29, 2005	978-4-7577-2488-4
9	March 30, 2006	978-4-7577-2663-5
10	April 28, 2006	978-4-7577-2742-7
11	October 30, 2006	978-4-7577-3000-7
12	April 28, 2007	978-4-7577-3503-3
13	October 29, 2007	978-4-7577-3793-8
14	May 30, 2008	978-4-7577-4230-7
15	July 30, 2008	978-4-7577-4333-5

=== Gargoyle Alternative ===
A spin-off series titled Gargoyle Alternative (ガーゴイルおるたなてぃぶ) was published from July 2006 to January 2009, lasting 5 volumes.

No.	Japanese release date	Japanese ISBN
1	July 29, 2006	978-4-7577-2866-0
2	January 29, 2007	978-4-7577-3325-1
3	July 30, 2007	978-4-7577-3631-3
4	January 30, 2008	978-4-7577-3978-9
5	January 30, 2009	978-4-7577-4648-0

=== Other ===
Short stories set in the Gargoyle universe have been published in various non-series books, including 3 collaborative short story anthologies.

No.	Title	Japanese release date	Japanese ISBN
1	Yoshinaga-san Chi no Gargoyle Anime Special (吉永さん家のガーゴイル アニメすぺしゃる)	October 30, 2006	978-4-7577-3003-8
A collection of short stories written to celebrate the anime release plus the written scenario for each anime episode.
2	Collab Anthology Ichi "Kyōran Kazoku Nikki" (「コラボアンソロジー1 狂乱家族日記」)	August 30, 2008	978-4-7577-4372-4
A collaborative anthology of short stories written by authors Akira, Sennendō Taguchi, Takaaki Kaima, Ryō Satō and Shio Sasahara. Cover illustrated by x6suke.
3	Collab Anthology Ni "Bungaku Shōjo" waa Gargoyle to Baka no Kaidan wo Noboru (コラボアンソロジー2 "文学少女"はガーゴイルとバカの階段を昇る)	October 30, 2008	978-4-7577-4484-4
A collaborative anthology of short stories written by authors Mizuki Nomura, Sennendō Taguchi, Takaaki Kaima and Kenji Inoue. Cover illustrated by Yui Haga.
4	Collab Anthology San "Magicians Academy" (コラボアンソロジー3 まじしゃんず・あかでみい)	January 30, 2009	978-4-7577-4581-0
A collaborative anthology of short stories written by authors Sennendō Taguchi, Takaaki Kaima, Furuhashi Hideyuki, Shinya Kasai and Akira. Cover illustrated by BLADE.

== Manga ==
The manga drawn by Kagari Tamaoka was serialized in the Magi-Cu ("Magical-Cute") magazine. The first tankōbon volume was released on March 31, 2006, while the second was published on February 25, 2008.

No.	Title	Japanese release date	Japanese ISBN
1	Yoshinaga-san Chi no Gargoyle (吉永さん家のガーゴイル)	March 31, 2006	978-4-7577-2690-1
2	Yoshinaga-san Chi no Gargoyle Happy & Heartfelt (吉永さん家のガーゴイル ハッピー&ハートフル)	February 25, 2008	978-4-7577-4073-0

== Anime ==
The anime was produced by Studio Hibari and began airing in April 2006, ending with a total of 13 episodes. Sentai Filmworks licensed the series in 2021. The opening theme, Ohayō! (オハヨウ) and main ending theme Ai nioide, Ai nioide (愛においで逢いにおいで) are performed by Chiwa Saito, Nana Mizuki, and Yuuna Inamura. Episode 13 has its own unique ending theme titled Kotae wa Sora no Shita (答えは空の下) which is sung by Chiwa Saito.

=== Episode list ===
No.	Title (Note: Japanese episode titles taken from Amazon.jp. English episode titles taken from HIDIVE.com.)	Original air date
1	"The Yoshinaga's Pebble" "Yoshinaga-san Chi no Ishikkoro" (吉永さん家の石ッころ)	April 1, 2006
Only a month after getting Gar-kun, he has already gained a bad reputation.
2	"Clash! An Angel and a Devil" "Gekitotsu! Tenshi to Akuma" (激突!天使と悪魔)	April 8, 2006
Futaba is lured to the Higashimiya mansion.
3	"The Stolen Girl" "Nusumareta Shōjo" (盗まれた少女)	April 15, 2006
Kaito Hyakushiki appears and rescues Lili from her father.
4	"The Heart with No Reflection" "Kagami ni Utsuranai Kokoro" (鏡に映らない心)	April 22, 2006
The battles between many for both Lili and the Philosopher's Stone continue.
5	"Singing Voice of the Mountain" "Yama no Utagoe" (山の歌声)	April 29, 2006
Iyo gives Futaba a helmet which allows her to communicate with plants.
6	"I Can't Hear Your Song Anymore" "Mou Kimi no Uta wa Kikoenai" (もう君の歌は聞こえない)	May 6, 2006
The Osiris appears.
7	"The Headless Dullahan That Loves Lili" "Lili Koishi ya Kubinashi Dullahan" (梨々恋しや首なしデュラハン)	May 13, 2006
Dullahan breaks out of the Hamilton research facility and goes after Lily who is home alone.
8	"Gargoyle of Glittering Silver Snow" "Ginsetsu no Gargoyle" (銀雪のガーゴイル !)	May 20, 2006
Gar-kun is given a new ability.
9	"Phantom Thief Lili" "Kaitō Lili" (怪盗梨々)	May 27, 2006
Lily and Dullahan take over for Hyakushiki who is ill.
10	"Shopping Arcade Rhapsody" "Shōtengai Kyōsōkyoku" (商店街狂想曲)	June 3, 2006
Gar-kun and his friends help rectify the shopping district merchants' declining popularity due to a large department store opening nearby.
11	"The String of Fate the Doll Found" "Ningyō ga Mitsuketa Akai Ito" (人形がみつけた赤い糸)	June 10, 2006
Momo, the younger sister of Kazumi's classmate and a member of their school's drama club, makes Kazumi a gift to show him her affection.
12	"A Marital Dispute is Part of the Festival" "Fūfugenka mo Matsuri no Hana" (夫婦喧嘩も祭りの華)	June 17, 2006
Goshiki is getting ready for the festival but one of Papa's old friends has plans to use it to advertise for the department store.
13	"All's Well that Ends in a Festival" "Matsuri Yokereba Owariyoshi!" (祭りよければ終わりよし!)	June 24, 2006
During the festival, Lily's father and the Zachore leader cause chaos in the shopping district by using a stolen artifact on the shrine's Sakura tree.
