= List of Book Girl light novels =

The cover of the first volume of the Book Girl light novel series released by Enterbrain.

Book Girl is a collection of Japanese light novels written by Mizuki Nomura, with illustrations by Miho Takeoka. The novels share the common title Book Girl (文学少女, Bungaku Shōjo), which is where the series gets its name. The series centers around Konoha Inoue, a writer in high school who joined the literature club after meeting Tohko Amano, the president and sole member of the club. Tohko can only eat stories by consuming the paper they are printed on and Tohko often asks Konoha to write her short stories as "snacks".

There are 16 novels in the series: eight cover the original series, four are short story collections, and four are of a side story. The eight novels of the original series were published between April 28, 2006, and August 30, 2008. The four short story collections were published between December 26, 2008, and December 25, 2010; many of the short stories were previously published in Enterbrain's FB Online online magazine. The four side story novels were published between April 30, 2009, and April 30, 2011. The first three side story novels are a part of a single story, while the last one is separate. The novels were published by Enterbrain under their Famitsu Bunko imprint. Yen Press licensed the light novel series and began releasing it in English in North America in July 2010, with a new volume being released every six months.

== Volume list ==
=== Main series ===
No.	Title	Original release date	English release date
1	Book Girl and the Suicidal Mime; Bungaku Shōjo to Shinitagari no Piero ("文学少女"と死にたがりの道化【ピエロ】)	April 28, 2006; 978-4-7577-2806-6	July 27, 2010; 978-0-316-07690-6
Prologue: "Memories for an Introduction—Volume 1: The Author, Girl Prodigy" (自己紹介代わりの回想――元·天才美少女作家です, Jikoshōkai Kawari no Kaisō—Moto Tensai Bishōjo Sakka desu); Chapter 1: "Tohko Has Refined Tastes" (遠子先輩は、美食家です, Tōko-senpai wa, Bishokuka desu); Chapter 2: "The Most Delicious Story in the World" (この世で一番美味しい物語, Konoyo de Ichiban Oishii Monogatari); Chapter 3: "The First Letter—Shuji Kataoka's Confession" (第一の手記～片岡愁二の告白, Daiichi no Shuki~Kataoka Shūji no Kokuhaku); Chapter 4: "One Bright Day in May, He..." (五月の晴れた日、彼は...。, Gogatsu no Hareta Hi, Kare wa...); Chapter 5: "The Book Girl's Deduction" ("文学少女"の推理, Bungaku Shōjo no Suiri); Chapter 6: "The Book Girl's Allegation" ("文学少女"の主張, Bungaku Shōjo no Shuchō); Epilogue: "A New Story" (新しい物語, Atarashii Monogatari)
Konoha Inoue is a second-year high school student and one of two members in his school's literature club, the other being third-year and club president Tohko Amano. Tohko is a self-proclaimed "book girl" who can only eat stories by consuming the paper they are printed on. After Tohko set up a mailbox for people to ask help in matters of love, a first-year girl named Chia Takeda comes to the literature club for help. Konoha ends up getting roped into writing love letters for the boy Chia likes, a third-year on the archery team named Shuji Kataoka. Konoha and Tohko discover there is no one on the archery team named Shuji. Chia takes Konoha to watch the archery team practice and when alumni of the archery club come to visit, they are surprised to see Konoha, who looks almost exactly like their old friend Shuji. Konoha and Tohko find out more about Shuji and how he had committed suicide ten years previous, as well as finding out that Chia already has a boyfriend. Chia lures Yasuyuki Soeda, one of Shuji's friends, to confront Konoha, since she suspected Soeda killed Shuji, who admits to stabbing him in the chest. However, Tohko arrives with Soeda's wife Rihoko and friend Shigeru Manabe, also previous friends of Shuji. Tohko proclaims that Rihoko was the one Shuji feared the most, since she saw through his act of always joking around. Rihoko admits to allowing Shuji to jump off the roof, after being stabbed by Soeda, so as to be at peace. Later, Konoha discovers that Chia had experienced similar things that Shuji had gone through, and he and Tohko manage to prevent Chia from committing suicide by jumping off the school roof.
2	Book Girl and the Famished Spirit; Bungaku Shōjo to Uekawaku Gōsuto ("文学少女"と飢え渇く幽霊【ゴースト】)	August 30, 2006; 978-4-7577-2915-5	January 25, 2011; 978-0-316-07692-0
Prologue: "Memories for an Introduction—I Used to Be a Shut-In" (自己紹介代わりの回想――あの頃ぼくは、引きこもりでした, Jikoshōkai Kawari no Kaisō—Ano Koro Boku wa, Hikikomori deshita); Chapter 1: "Pay Attention to What You Eat" (食べ物を粗末にしてはいけません, Tabemono o Somatsu ni Shite wa Ikemasen); Chapter 2: "Who is That?" (誰ですか、アレ, Dare desu ka, Are); Chapter 3: "When I Met You" (ぼくが出逢ったきみ, Boku ga Deatta Kimi); Chapter 4: "Spirit from the Past" (過去の亡霊, Kako no Bōrei); Chapter 5: "The Book Girl's Report" ("文学少女"の報告, Bungaku Shōjo no Hōkoku); Chapter 6: "This is Our Secret Room" (ここは秘密のお部屋だから, Koko wa Himitsu no Oheya dakara); Chapter 7: "The Tale of the Famished Spirit" (飢え渇く魂の物語, Uekawaku Tamashii no Monogatari); Chapter 8: "The Girl in the Storm" (嵐の少女, Arashi no Shōjo); Epilogue: "And So We..." (そして、ぼくらは..., Soshite, Bokura wa...)
One day after school, Tohko looks in the literature club's mailbox and finds a bunch of scraps of paper with mysterious short phrases and strings of numbers. After they stake out the mailbox, they discover an emaciated girl, who says she is Kayano Kujo, wearing the school's old uniform and proclaims that she is already dead. However, Tohko finds out that the girl's real name is Hotaru Amemiya, and Tohko is determined to uncover the mystery of the ghost, but Konoha wants no part in it. However, Konoha meets with Ryuto Sakurai, a boy who lives with his mother and Tohko, and who is in a relationship with Hotaru. Konoha meets with Hotaru and her alter ego Kayano to help Ryuto understand her behavior. Konoha and Ryuto discover Hotaru demolishing a room in her mansion, though Konoha leaves to go back home. Tohko calls him from the police station, and explains she was investigating with Nanase, who is recovering in a hospital after being injured. Tohko explains that she has found out Kayano as Hotaru's mother, and the relationship she shares with her uncle and guardian Tamotsu Kurosaki. Konoha and Tohko go to Hotaru's mansion to look for Ryuto, but are almost killed by Hotaru, who believes them to be the dead spirits of Kayano and Aoi Kunieda, whom Kayano had loved. Ryuto had been stabbed and nearly killed by Hotaru. Tohko, Konoha, Ryuto and Maki Himekura go to a church to find Kurosaki and Hotaru, who wanted to enact her revenge against Kurosaki. Tohko reveals that they are actually father and daughter, something only Hotaru was aware of, and that Hotaru loves Kurosaki as much as she hates him. Hotaru had been suffering from a terminal disease and dies a week later.
3	Book Girl and the Captive Fool; Bungaku Shōjo to Tsunagareta Fūru ("文学少女"と繋がれた愚者【フール】)	December 25, 2006; 978-4-7577-3084-7	August 16, 2011; 978-0-316-07693-7
Prologue: "Memories for an Introduction—I Used to be a Fool in Love" (自己紹介代わりの回想――ぼくは、恋する馬鹿者でした, Jikoshōkai Kawari no Kaisō—Boku wa, Koisuru Bakamono deshita); Chapter 1: "Don't Leave a Crumb" (ごはんは、残さず食べましょう, Gohan wa, Nokosazu Tabemashō); Chapter 2: "Lemon Cookies Taste Like Youth" (レモンクッキーは青春の味, Remon Kukkī wa Seishun no Aji); Chapter 3: "I'll Slice it to Pieces" (切り裂きたいもの, Kirisakitai Mono); Chapter 4: "Girl From The Past" (過去から来た少女, Kako kara Kita Shōjo); Chapter 5: "You Were Crying That Day" (あのとき、きみが泣いたので, Ano Toki, Kimi ga Naita no de); Chapter 6: "A Fool's Labyrinth" (愚か者の迷宮, Orokamono no Meikyū); Chapter 7: "The Book Girl's Wish" ("文学少女"の願い, Bungaku Shōjo no Negai); Epilogue: "Friends" (ともだち, Tomodachi)
4	Book Girl and the Corrupted Angel; Bungaku Shōjo to Aimei no Anju ("文学少女"と穢名の天使【アンジュ】)	April 28, 2007; 978-4-7577-3506-4	January 24, 2012; 978-0-316-07694-4
Prologue: "Memories for an Introduction—I Used to be an Angel" (自己紹介代わりの回想――ぼくが天使といた頃, Jikoshōkai Kawari no Kaisō—Boku ga Tenshi to Ita Koro); Chapter 1: "Don't Ever Forget The Snack" (おやつは絶対、忘れずに, Oyatsu wa Zettai, Wasurezu ni); Chapter 2: "The Diva's Whereabouts" (歌姫の行方, Utahime no Yukue); Chapter 3: "The Angel Watches From The Shadows" (天使は闇から見つめている, Tenshi wa Yami kara Mitsumeteiru); Chapter 4: "The Book Girl's Value" ("文学少女"のお値打ち, Bungaku Shōjo no Oneuchi); Chapter 5: "That Was My First Love" (あれが、あたしの初恋でした, Are ga, Atashi no Hatsukoi deshita); Chapter 6: "A Song of Death and Ice" (死と氷の歌, Shi to Kōri no Uta); Chapter 7: "Inside the Dark, Dark Earth" (暗い、暗い、土の中, Kurai, Kurai, Tsuchi no Naka); Chapter 8: "I'll go, Then" (じゃあ、行くね, Jaa, Iku ne); Epilogue: "To You, My Dear Friend" (親愛なるきみへ, Shin'ai Naru Kimi e)
5	Book Girl and the Wayfarer's Lamentation; Bungaku Shōjo to Dōkoku no Parumiēre ("文学少女"と慟哭の巡礼者【パルミエーレ】)	August 30, 2007; 978-4-7577-3685-6	July 24, 2012; 978-0-316-07695-1
Prologue: "Memories for an Introduction—What I Wanted to Be" (自己紹介代わりの回想――ぼくがなりたかったもの, Jikoshōkai Kawari no Kaisō—Boku ga Naritakatta Mono); Chapter 1: "Step by Step It Comes" (ぼくらは、おずおずと, Bokura wa, Ozuozu to); Chapter 2: "Why Miu Inoue Died" (井上ミウが死んだ理由（わけ）, Inoue Miu ga Shinda Wake); Chapter 3: "That is a Pristine Trap" (それは、聖（きよ）らかな罠, Sore wa, Kiyoraka na Wana); Chapter 4: "A Map Through The Stars" (星を巡る地図, Hoshi ga Meguru Chizu); Chapter 5: "The Defeated Youth" (敗れた少年, Yabureta Shōnen); Chapter 6: "Who Killed The Little Bird?" (誰が、小鳥を殺したの?, Dare ga, Kotori o Koroshita no?); Chapter 7: "Journey in The Dark of Night" (闇夜の旅路, Yamiyo no Tabiji); Chapter 8: "Lamentation" (慟哭, Dōkoku); Chapter 9: "Back When You Looked at the Sky" (きみが空を見ていたころ, Kimi ga Sora o Miteita Koro); Epilogue: "The Beginning of the End" (終わりのはじまり, Owari no Hajimari)
6	Book Girl and the Undine Who Bore a Moonflower; Bungaku Shōjo to Tsuki-hana o Daku Undīne ("文学少女"と月花を孕く水妖【ウンディーネ】)	December 25, 2007; 978-4-7577-3918-5	January 22, 2013; 978-0-316-07696-8
Prologue: "Maki-Firefly Nightfall/The Princess Speaks" (麻貴 蛍の宵・姫の語れる, Maki Hotaru no Yoi Hime no Katareru); Chapter 1: "A Bad Person Abducted Me" (さらったのは悪い人です, Saratta no wa Warui Hito desu); Chapter 2: "The Oracle Who Read From Books" (本を読む巫女, Hon o Yomu Miko); Chapter 3: "Shirayuki Appears" (白雪あらわる, Shirayuki Arawaru); Chapter 4: "The Princess' Situation" (姫の事情, Hime no Jijō); Chapter 5: "The Guest Who Was Too Early/The Lover Who Disappeared" (早すぎた客人・消えた恋人, Hayasugita Kyakujin Kieta Koibito); Chapter 6: "A Crimson World" (緋色の誓い, Hiiro no Chikai); Epilogue: "I Know That I'll be Smiling" (私は、きっと笑っています, Watashi wa, Kitto Waratteimasu)
7	Book Girl and the Scribe Who Faced God (part 1); Bungaku Shōjo to Kami ni Nozomu Romanshie Jō ("文学少女"と神に臨む作家【ロマンシエ】 上)	April 28, 2008; 978-4-7577-4173-7	July 23, 2013; 978-0-316-07697-5
Prologue: "Memories for an Introduction—What She Wished For That Day" (自己紹介代わりの回想――あの日、彼女が願ったこと――, Jikoshōkai Kawari no Kaisō—Ano Hi, Kanojo ga Negatta Koto—); Chapter 1: "My President and My Girlfriend" (先輩と彼女, Senpai to Kanojo); Chapter 2: "The Day You Betrayed Me" (きみが裏切った日, Kimi ga Uragitta Hi); Chapter 3: "A Very High Place Filled With Light" (いと高く、光満ちる場所, Ito Takaku, Hikari Michiru Basho); Chapter 4: "An Author's Lies" (作家の嘘, Sakka no Uso); Chapter 5: "The Morning of Good-bye" (さよならの朝, Sayonara no Asa); Chapter 6: "The Two Stories of Death" (死神の二つの物語, Shinigami no Futatsu no Monogatari); Chapter 7: "The Girl with the Violet Barrette" (すみれの髪飾りの少女, Sumire no Kamikazari no Shōjo)
8	Book Girl and the Scribe Who Faced God (part 2); Bungaku Shōjo to Kami ni Nozomu Romanshie Ge ("文学少女"と神に臨む作家【ロマンシエ】 下)	August 30, 2008; 978-4-7577-4371-7	January 21, 2014; 978-0-316-07698-2
Prologue: "Memories for an Introduction:The Last Thing She Whispered" (自己紹介代わりの回想――彼女が、最後につぶやいたこと――, Jikoshōkai Kawari no Kaisō—Kanojo ga, Saigo ni Tsubuyaita Koto—); Chapter 1: "The Murderous Desire You Trigger In Me" (きみが揺らす、ぼくの殺意, Kimi ga Yurasu, Boku no Satsui); Chapter 2: "Poison Dripping From The Hand" (毒をたらす手, Doku o Tarasu Te); Chapter 3: "Words Hidden" (秘められた言葉, Himerareta Kotoba); Chapter 4: "A Dwindling Back, Not Even a Footfall" (足音を立てずに、消えてゆく背中, Ashioto o Tatezu ni, Kieteyuku Senaka); Chapter 5: "The Anguish of Paradise" (楽園の苦悩, Rakuen no Kunō); Chapter 6: "When The World Ends" (世界が終わるとき, Sekai ga Owaru Toki); Chapter 7: "To The Person I Love The Most" (最愛の人へ, Saiai no Hito e); Chapter 8: "The Scribe Who Faced God" (神に臨む作家, Kami ni Nozomu Sakka); Epilogue: "Book Girl" (文学少女, Bungaku Shōjo)

=== Short story collections ===
No.	Title	Release date	ISBN
1	Book Girl and Falling in Love Episode 1 Bungaku Shōjo to Koisuru Episōdo 1 ("文学少女"と恋する挿話集【エピソード】 1)	December 26, 2008	978-4-7577-4578-0
"Book Girl and the Minotaur in Love" ("文学少女"と恋する牛魔王【ミノタウロス】, Bungaku Shōjo to Koisuru Minotaurosu); "Book Girl's Snack for Today: Sarashina Diary" ("文学少女"の今日のおやつ 〜『更級日記』〜, Bungaku Shōjo no Kyō no Oyatsu ~Sarashina Nikki~); "Book Girl and the Revolutionary Proletarian" ("文学少女"と革命する労働者【プロレタリア】, Bungaku Shōjo to Kakumeisuru Puroretaria); "Book Girl's Snack for Today: Man'yōshū" ("文学少女"の今日のおやつ 〜『万葉集』〜, Bungaku Shōjo no Kyō no Oyatsu ~Man'yōshū~); "Book Girl and the Sickly Chloe" ("文学少女"と病がちな乙女【クロエー】, Bungaku Shōjo to Yamaigachi na Kuroē); "Book Girl's Snack for Today: The Little Bookroom" ("文学少女"の今日のおやつ 〜『ムギと王さま』〜, Bungaku Shōjo no Kyō no Oyatsu ~Mugi to Ō-sama~); "The Reserved Prince and the Humble Walking Mermaid" (無口な王子【プリンス】と歩き下手の人魚【マーメイド】, Mukuchi na Purinsu to Aruki Shitade no Māmeido); "Book Girl and the Lady Through the Door" ("文学少女"と扉のこちらの姫【レイディ】, Bungaku Shōjo to Tobira no Kochira no Reidi); "Book Girl and the Fickle Jokanaan" ("文学少女"と浮気な預言者【ヨカナーン】, Bungaku Shōjo to Uwaki na Yokanān); "Book Girl's Snack for Today Special Chapter: The Snow Goose" ("文学少女"の今日のおやつ 特別編〜『スノーグース』〜, Bungaku Shōjo no Kyō no Oyatsu Tokubetsu-hen ~Sunō Gūsu~)
2	Book Girl and Falling in Love Episode 2 Bungaku Shōjo to Koisuru Episōdo 2 ("文学少女"と恋する挿話集【エピソード】 2)	August 29, 2009	978-4-7577-5039-5
"Mori-chan's Muttering" (森ちゃんのつぶやき, Mori-chan no Tsubuyaki); "Book Girl and Heine Who Shouts Love" ("文学少女"と愛を叫ぶ詩人【ハイネ】, Bungaku Shōjo to Ai o Sakebu Haine); "Book Girl's Snack for Today: Lolita" ("文学少女"の今日のおやつ 〜『ロリータ』〜, Bungaku Shōjo no Kyō no Oyatsu ~Rorīta~); "Book Girl and Byron Who Couldn't Wait for a Kiss" ("文学少女"とキスを待てない詩人【バイロン】, Bungaku Shōjo to Kisu o Matenai Bairon); "Book Girl's Snack for Today: The Flying Classroom" ("文学少女"の今日のおやつ 〜『飛ぶ教室』〜, Bungaku Shōjo no Kyō no Oyatsu ~Tobu Kyōshitsu~); "Nanase's Love Diary Chapter 1: Merely a Single Dream" (ななせの恋日記 其ノ一 たったひとつの願いごと, Nanase no Koi Nikki Sono Ichi Tatta Hitotsu no Negaigoto); "Nanase's Love Diary Chapter 2: The Hated Lining" (ななせの恋日記 其ノ二 大嫌いの裏側, Nanase no Koi Nikki Sono Ni Daikirai no Uragawa); "Nanase's Love Diary Chapter 3: Tomorrow for Sure" (ななせの恋日記 其ノ三 明日にはきっと, Nanase no Koi Nikki Sono San Ashita ni wa Kitto); "Book Girl and the Dirty Chūya" ("文学少女"と汚れつちまつた詩人【チューヤ】, Bungaku Shōjo to Yogore Tsuchimatsuta Chūya); "Book Girl's Snack for Today: The Silver Spoon" ("文学少女"の今日のおやつ 〜『銀の匙』〜, Bungaku Shōjo no Kyō no Oyatsu ~Gin no Saji~); "Book Girl and the Blessed Tagore" ("文学少女"と祝福する詩人【タゴール】, Bungaku Shōjo to Shukufukusuru Dagōru); "Nanase's Love Diary Special Chapter" (ななせの恋日記 特別編, Nanase no Koi Nikki Tokubetsu-hen)
3	Book Girl and Falling in Love Episode 3 Bungaku Shōjo to Koisuru Episōdo 3 ("文学少女"と恋する挿話集【エピソード】 3)	April 30, 2010	978-4-04-726487-8
"Book Girl and Fire Raising Minotaur" ("文学少女"と炎を上げる牛魔王【ミノタウロス】, Bungaku Shōjo to Honō o Ageru Minotaurosu); "Book Girl's Snack for Today: Five Women Who Loved Love" ("文学少女"の今日のおやつ 〜『好色五人女』〜, Bungaku Shōjo no Kyō no Oyatsu ~Kōshoku Gonin Onna~); "Book Girl and the Maid Who Falls in Love" ("文学少女"と恋しはじめの女給【メイド】, Bungaku Shōjo to Koishihajime no Meido); "Book Girl's Snack for Today: Ravine" ("文学少女"の今日のおやつ 〜『谷間』〜, Bungaku Shōjo no Kyō no Oyatsu ~Tanima~); "The Wounded Tenor and the Pure Soprano" (傷ついた紳士【テノール】と穢れなき歌姫【ソプラノ】, Kizutsuita Tenōru to Kegarenaki Sopurano); "The Young Diva and the Wandering Angel" (卵の歌姫【ディーヴァ】と彷徨える天使【エンゲル】, Tamago no Dīva to Samayoeru Engeru); "Ms. Tohko's Secret" (遠子おばタンの秘密, Tōko Oba-tan no Himitsu); "The Wavering Bambi and The Lying Doll" (迷える仔鹿【バンビ】と嘘つき人形【ドール】, Mayoeru Banbi to Usotsuki Dōru); "The Persistent Bambi and the Cowardly Holly" (頑張る仔鹿【バンビ】と臆病な旅行者【ホリー】, Ganbaru Banbi to Okubyō na Horī); "The Mime's Muttering" (道化【ピエロ】のつぶやき, Piero no Tsubuyaki)
4	Book Girl and Falling in Love Episode 4 Bungaku Shōjo to Koisuru Episōdo 4 ("文学少女"と恋する挿話集【エピソード】 4)	December 25, 2010	978-4-04-726960-6
"Book Girl Apprentice's Discovery" ("文学少女"見習いの、発見。, Bungaku Shōjo Minarai no, Hakken.); "Book Girl and the Nobel in Deep Thought" ("文学少女"と物思ふ公達【ノーブル】, Bungaku Shōjo to Monomofu Nōburu); "Book Girl's Snack for Today: Jonathan Livingston Seagull" ("文学少女"の今日のおやつ 〜『かもめのジョナサン』〜, Bungaku Shōjo no Kyō no Oyatsu ~Kamome no Jonasan~); "Book Girl and the Joyous Child" ("文学少女"と幸福な子供【チャイルド】, Bungaku Shōjo to Kōfuku na Chairudo); "Book Girl and the Noisy Lovers" ("文学少女"と騒がしい恋人【ラヴァーズ】たち, Bungaku Shōjo to Sawagashii Ravāzu-tachi); "Studio's Secret Talk" (アトリエの内緒話, Atorie no Naishobanashi); "The Girl of Displeasure and the Lemon Boy" (不機嫌な私【ガール】と檸檬の君【ボーイ】, Fukigen na Gāru to Remon no Bōi); "Miu: Take One Step At a Time While Confused" (美羽〜戸惑いながら一歩ずつ〜, Miu ~Tomadoinagara Ippozutsu~); "Nanase: Call to an Angel" (ななせ〜天使へのコール〜, Nanase ~Tenshi e no Kōru~); "Hotaru: To the Inside of the Sunlight After the Storm" (蛍〜嵐のあとの陽の中へ〜, Hotaru ~Arashi no Ato no Hi no Naka e~); "Book Girl's Snack for Today: Under the Blossoming Cherry Trees" ("文学少女"の今日のおやつ 〜『桜の森の満開の下』〜, Bungaku Shōjo no Kyō no Oyatsu ~Sakura no Mori no Mankai no Shita~); "The Cream Puff's Secret" (シュークリームの秘密, Shū Kurīmu no Himitsu); "Book Girl's Snack for Today Special Chapter: 100 Years Later" ("文学少女"の今日のおやつ 特別編〜『百年後』〜, Bungaku Shōjo no Kyō no Oyatsu Tokubetsu-hen ~Hyakkunengo~)

=== Side story series ===
No.	Title	Release date	ISBN
1	Book Girl Apprentice's First Love; Bungaku Shōjo Minarai no, Hatsukoi. ("文学少女"見習いの、初戀【はつこい】。)	April 30, 2009	978-4-7577-4829-3
"Book Girl Apprentice's First Love" ("文学少女"見習いの、初戀【はつこい】。, Bungaku Shōjo Minarai no, Hatsukoi.); "Book Girl Apprentice's Lovers Suicide" ("文学少女"見習いの、心中【しんじゅう】。, Bungaku Shōjo Minarai no, Shinjū.)
2	Book Girl Apprentice's Heartbreak; Bungaku Shōjo Minarai no, Shōshin. ("文学少女"見習いの、傷心【しょうしん】。)	December 26, 2009	978-4-04-726030-6 (regular edition); 978-4-04-726029-0 (DVD bundled edition)
"Book Girl Apprentice's Heartbreak" ("文学少女"見習いの、傷心【しょうしん】。, Bungaku Shōjo Minarai no, Shōshin.); "Book Girl Apprentice's Monster" ("文学少女"見習いの、怪物【かいぶつ】。, Bungaku Shōjo Minarai no, Kaibutsu.)
3	Book Girl Apprentice's Graduation; Bungaku Shōjo Minarai no, Sotsugyō. ("文学少女"見習いの、卒業【そつぎょう】。)	August 30, 2010	978-4-04-726725-1
"Book Girl Apprentice's Loneliness" ("文学少女"見習いの、寂寞【せきばく】。, Bungaku Shōjo Minarai no, Sekibaku.); "Book Girl Apprentice's Graduation" ("文学少女"見習いの、卒業【そつぎょう】。, Bungaku Shōjo Minarai no, Sotsugyō.)
4	Soft-boiled Author and the Book Girl Muse; Hanjuku Sakka to Bungaku Shōjo na Myūzu (半熟作家と“文学少女”な編集者【ミューズ】)	April 30, 2011	978-4-04-727222-4
"Soft-boiled Author and the Book Girl Muse" (半熟作家と"文学少女"な編集者【ミューズ】, Hanjuku Sakka to Bungaku Shōjo na Myūzu); "Soft-boiled Author and the Scandalous Scarlet" (半熟作家とスキャンダラスな淑女【スカーレット】, Hanjuku Sakka to Sukyandarasu na Sukāretto); "Soft-boiled Author and the Fussy Scarlet" (半熟作家と空騒ぎの学友達【スカーレット】, Hanjuku Sakka to Karasawagi no Sukāretto); "Soft-boiled Author and the Dears That Turn the Pages" (半熟作家とページを捲る"文学少女"【ディアーズ】, Hanjuku Sakka to Pēji o Makuru Diāzu)

=== Additional stories ===
- "Someday, Until the Day I Meet You" (いつか、きみに会う日まで, Itsuka, Kimi no Au Hi made)
- "Magnolia's Prayer" (木蓮（マグノリア）の祈り, Magunoria no Inori)
- "The End of the Summer You Were Here" (きみがいた夏の終わり, Kimi ga Ita Natsu no Owari)
- "Book Girl Peace Chapter: The Young Lord Put into Writing and the Young Lady Put into Speech and Reading" ("文学少女"平安編 書き綴る若君と読み語る女房, Bungaku Shōjo Heian-hen Kakitsuzuru Wakagimi to Yomikataru Nyōbō)
- "The Mermaid Likes Sweet Romance" (人魚姫【マーメイド】は甘いロマンスが好き, Māmeido wa Amai Romansu ga Suki)
- "The Snow Queen Won't Allow Love" (雪の女王(スノークイーン)は愛を許さない, Sunō Kuīn wa Ai o Yurusanai)
- "Belle Turned Away with a Scowl" (美女(ベル)はツンと顔をそむける, Beru wa Tsun to Kao o Sumukeru)
- "Sweet Digression: Always From Now On" (甘い余談～これからも、ずっと, Amai Yodan: Korekara mo, Zutto)
