= Light Novel Award =

Literary award

The Light Novel Award (ライトノベルアワード, Raito Noberu Awaado) was a literary award handed out by the Japanese publisher Kadokawa Shoten for light novels, and was only held once in 2007. The novels which were applicable to receive the award were either published by Kadokawa Shoten under their Kadokawa Sneaker Bunko light novel label, or by three other publishing companies affiliated with Kadokawa Shoten in the Kadokawa Group—Enterbrain, Fujimi Shobo, and MediaWorks. The novels by Enterbrain were published under their Famitsu Bunko label; the novels by Fujimi Shobo were published under their Fujimi Fantasia Bunko or Fujimi Mystery Bunko labels; and the novels by MediaWorks were published under their Dengeki Bunko label (which encompasses their sub label Dengeki Game Bunko as well). There were five categories in the contest—romantic comedy, school setting, action, mystery, and novelization (for novels based on previously published material)—with four novels being picked for each category (one from each publisher) during the semi-final round. The final round picked one novel from each of the four listed in each category which became the winner in that given category. The winners were decided by readers of the novels themselves.

== Prize winners ==
Romantic comedy Toradora!, Yuyuko Takemiya Runners-up Goshūshō-sama Ninomiya-kun, Daisuke Suzuki Kamisama Game, Shū Miyazaki Magician's Academy, Ichirō Sakaki School setting Chrome Shelled Regios, Shūsuke Amagi Runners-up Andaka no Kaizōgaku, Akira Asura Cryin', Gakuto Mikumo Gakkō no Kaidan, Takaaki Kaima Action Rental Magica, Makoto Sanda Runners-up Kōtetsu no Shiro Usagi Kishi Dan, Kō Maisaka Rengoku no Escudo, Junichirō Takane Toaru Majutsu no Index, Kazuma Kamachi	Mystery Book Girl series, Mizuki Nomura Runners-up Danshō no Grimm, Gakuto Coda Makizoe Holic, Ryōta Azuma Shi-No, Amane Kōzuki Novelization Monster Hunter (adapted from the video game), Yūkinrin Runners-up Eureka Seven, Tomonori Zugihara Gunparade Orchestra, Ryōsuke Sakaki Karin Zōketsuki, Tōru Kai
