= Miss Medic's Diary at War =

Japanese light novel and manga series

- Medics Battlefield Diary
- First light novel volume cover

TS衛生兵さんの戦場日記 (TS Eiseihei-san no Senjō Nikki)
- Genre: Isekai, war
- Novel series
- Written by: Tama Masaki
- Published by: Shōsetsuka ni Narō
- Original run: January 23, 2022 – present
- Light novel
- Written by: Tama Masaki
- Illustrated by: Kureta (vol. 1–4); Daichi (vol. 5–)
- Published by: Enterbrain
- English publisher: NA: J-Novel Club
- Imprint: Famitsu Bunko
- Original run: July 28, 2023 – present
- Volumes: 7
- Manga
- Written by: Tama Masaki
- Illustrated by: Mimishiki
- Published by: ASCII Media Works
- Imprint: Dengeki Comics NEXT
- Magazine: Dengeki Comic Regulus
- Original run: August 25, 2023 – present
- Volumes: 5

Medics Battlefield Diary (TS衛生兵さんの戦場日記, TS Eiseihei-san no Senjō Nikki) is a Japanese light novel series written by Tama Masaki and illustrated by Kureta. It began serialization as a web novel published on Shōsetsuka ni Narō in January 2022. It was later acquired by Enterbrain who began publishing it under their Famitsu Bunko imprint in July 2023. A manga adaptation illustrated by Mimishiki began serialization on ASCII Media Works' Dengeki Comic Regulus manga website in August 2023.

== Plot ==
A former professional FPS gamer is reincarnated in a fantasy world as a young orphan girl named Touri Noel. Although she expected a magical world of adventure, she instead finds herself in a war-torn land filled with gunfire, artillery, and brutal battlefield conditions. After discovering she has an aptitude for healing magic, Touri volunteers for the army as a combat medic in order to earn money to support the orphanage where she was raised.

Despite lacking proper magical training, Touri is assigned to a frontline assault unit on the Western Front and is ordered to serve as the personal medic to Garback, a ruthless commander known for achieving results regardless of casualties. Forced to operate in extremely dangerous combat zones, Touri uses her healing magic and her knowledge from her previous life as a shooter gamer to survive the battlefield and keep her patients alive.

== Media ==
=== Light novel ===
Written by Tama Masaki, Miss Medic's Diary at War began serialization as a web novel on Shōsetsuka ni Narō on January 23, 2022. It was later acquired by Enterbrain who began publishing the series with illustrations by Kureta under their Famitsu Bunko light novel imprint on July 28, 2023. Later volumes feature illustrations by Daichi (from volume 5 onwards) with Kureta credited for character design. Seven volumes have been released as of July 30, 2026.

In February 2026, J-Novel Club announced that they had licensed the series for English publication.

No.	Original release date	Original ISBN	English release date	English ISBN
1	July 28, 2023	978-4-04-737542-0	May 19, 2026	978-1-7183-9610-4
1. "Year 1938, Summer 1"; 2. "Western Front 1"; 3. "Year 1938, Summer 2"; 4. "Western Front 2"; 5. "Year 1938, Summer 3"; 6. "Western Front 3"; 7. "Year 1938, Summer 4"; 8. "Western Front 4"; 9. "Year 1938, Summer 5"
2	December 28, 2023	978-4-04-737736-3	August 18, 2026	978-1-7183-9612-8
1. "Year 1938, Summer 6"; 2. "Mashdale Defense Battle"; 3. "Year 1938, Summer 7"; 4. "Mashdale Defense Battle 2"; 5. "Year 1938, Summer 8"; 6. "Mashdale Evacuation 1"; 7. "Year 1938, Summer 9"; 8. "Mashdale Evacuation 2"; 9. "Year 1938, Summer 10"; 10. "Mashdale Evacuation 3"; 11. "Year 1938, Summer 11"; 12. "Mashdale Evacuation 4"; 13. "Year 1938, Summer 12"; 14. "Wynn Capital 1"; 15. "Year 1938, Summer 13"; 16. "Wynn Capital 2"; 17. "Year 1938, Summer 14"
3	May 30, 2024	978-4-04-737983-1	November 3, 2026	978-1-7183-9614-2
1. "Year 1938 Summer 15"; 2. "Wynn Capital 3"; 3. "Year 1938 Summer 16"; 4. "Wynn Capital 4"; 5. "September 30th, Night"; 6. "October 1st, Late at Night, Early Dawn"; 7. "October 1st, Morning"; 8. "Year 1938 Summer 17"; 9. "Western March 1"; 10. "Year 1938 Summer 18"; 11. "Western March 2"; 12. "Western March 3"; 13. "Year 1938 Summer 20"
4	November 29, 2024	978-4-04-738124-7	February 4, 2027	978-1-7183-9616-6
5	July 30, 2025	978-4-04-738465-1	—	—
6	December 27, 2025	978-4-04-738640-2	—	—
7	July 30, 2026	978-4-04-500080-5	—	—

=== Manga ===
A manga adaptation illustrated by Mimishiki began serialization on ASCII Media Works' Dengeki Comic Regulus manga website on August 25, 2023. The manga's chapters have been compiled into five tankōbon volumes as of October 2026.

No.	Release date	ISBN
1	February 26, 2024	978-4-04-915585-3
2	August 27, 2024	978-4-04-915887-8
3	April 25, 2025	978-4-04-916389-6
4	January 27, 2026	978-4-04-916906-5
5	October 27, 2026	978-4-04-952472-7

== Reception ==
The series won the Next Light Novel Award 2023 in the tankōbon category.
