= Famitsu Bunko =

Japanese publishing imprint

Famitsu Bunko (ファミ通文庫, Famitsū Bunko) is a light novel publishing imprint affiliated with the Japanese publishing company Enterbrain, a division of Kadokawa Future Publishing. It was established on July 18, 1998, and is aimed at young adult male audience. The label accounted for 7% of the Japanese light novel market in 2009.

== Published titles ==
=== !–9 ===
Title	Author	Illustrator	No. of volumes
100 Gold Shop "Usagiya"	Origami Nekomiya	Yuichi Murakami	2
420 Renpai Girl	Naruto Kiriyama	Rio Nanamomo	4

=== A ===
Title	Author	Illustrator	No. of volumes
Ajisai no Kisetsu ni Bokura wa Kannō suru	Fumihiko Shimo	You Shiina	1
Anata no Kotonara Nandemo Shitteru Watashi ga Kanojo ni Narubekida yo ne	Aizuki Kaname	Achiki	1
Aoi Haruno Subete	Sadanatsu Anda	Yukiko Horiguchi	5
Aquanaut Chronicle		Cosmic	1
Arcana Narrative	Yūki Itō	Shii	1
Arasa ga VTuber ni Natta Hanashi	Tokumei	Karasu BTK	6
Argent Carrère	Mizuki Nomura	Manyako	2
Arianrhod x Alshard Collaboration Replay - Blue Sphere Daydream	Takeshi Kikuchi, Tarou Suzufuki	Hiroyuki Ishida	1
Arist Craisi	Keishi Ayasato	Ruroo	3
Asahina-san Quest senpai, Watashi wo Hitotsudake Homete Mite Kudasai	Senji Ichinichi	U35	1

=== B ===
Title	Author	Illustrator	No. of volumes
B.A.D.	Keishi Ayasato	kona	13
Baka to Test to Shōkanjū	Kenji Inoue	Yui Haga	16
Boku no Coffee-ten ni wa Chiisana Mahōtsukai ga Isōrō shiteiru	Fuminori Teshima	Ame Karasuba	1
Boku no Gakkō no Ansatsubu	Fukami Makoto	Haruaki Fuyuno	3
Bukatsu Shōjo Battle	Hajime Tsukimoto	Itsui	1
Bungaku Shōjo	Mizuki Nomura	Miho Takeoka	16
Busaiku desukedo Nanika? Tensai Majutsushi Saidai no Ketten	Shiharu Kuromine	Akahito	2

=== C ===
Title	Author	Illustrator	No. of volumes
Cafe de Blood	Mizuki Mizushiro	Namanie	1
Call of Cthulhu TRPG VS Ii Otona-tachi Replay - Nama Hōsō de Jashin Shōkan!	Ii Otona-tachi, Shinkurō Bandō	Taichoo, Yui Haga	1
Chibikko Kenja, Lv.1 Isekai de Ganbarimasu!	Ayato Yume	Takehana Note	5
Chikasugiru Karera no, Jūnanasai no Tōi Kankei	Yu Kudo	Kina Kazuharu	1
Chloride ni Shizumu	Akira Ogata, Kūtarō Hokari, Maru Kashii, Riichi Kitaumi	Kazutomo Miya, ODESSA, Yashiro Hiiragi	1
Commushō no Ore ga, Kōshō Skill ni ZenFurishite Tenseishita Kekka	Tōwa Akatsuki	Mitsuki Yano	4
Cosmic Princess Kaguya!	Naruto Kiriyama	Asao Urata	1
Crimson Magi Trunnion	Kō Maisaka	Nihonen	1

=== D ===
Title	Author	Illustrator	No. of volumes
Daitoshokan no Hitsujikai	Noritake Tao	Masao Aona	2
Daraku no Ō	Tsukikage	Erect Sawaru	2
Densetsu no Onnēsan tachi ga, Yūsha no Iukoto wo Kiite Kurenai no Desu ga	Akihiko Ureshino	Tetsubuta	1
Dress na Boku ga Yangotonaki Katagata no Kateikyōshi-sama na Kudan	Mizuki Nomura	Karory	8
Dungeon Surveyor	Akihiko Ureshino	Irua	2

=== E ===
Title	Author	Illustrator	No. of volumes
Eiyū Shikkaku	Shunsuke Sarai	Tetsuhiro Nabeshima	3
Endenburg no Hanayome	Minamo Mizuki	Yasumo	1
Esther do Baronia	Masaru Hyakukuro	sime	2

=== F ===
Title	Author	Illustrator	No. of volumes
Fami Plex	Toshihiko Tsukiji	Megumi Kawahara	3
Final Fantasy XI: Owari Naki Daichi no Uta	Miyabi Hasegawa		1
Flower Knight Girl	Ryūji Koregane	Satoru Arikawa	3
Frontier World: Shōkanshi to Shite Katsudōchū	Nagawasabi64	Yū Tachibana	1
Fusetsu no Fushiō no Saiseiki	Sasaki Sakuma	Eishi Hayama	1

=== G ===
Title	Author	Illustrator	No. of volumes
Gabriela Senki	Kō Maisaka	Kira Yūki	7
Galge no Sekai yo, Youkoso!	Noritake Tao	Satoru Arikawa	12
Gakkō no Kaidan	Takaaki Kaima	Amane Amahuku	12
Gakkō no Soto-Kaidan	Takaaki Kaima	Amane Amahuku	2
Gekkō Senki Ariel	Kō Maisaka	Fruit Punch	2
Genjū Chōsain	Keishi Ayasato	Lack	2
Ginga Joshi Chūgakusei Diary	Shōji Takashi	Gochō	1

=== H ===
Title	Author	Illustrator	No. of volumes
Hagane no Kuro Usagi Kishi	Kō Maisaka	Ben Itō	1
Hagane no Shirousagi Kishidan	Kō Maisaka	Ben Itō	10
Hagure Madō Kyōshi no Unlimited Eiyū Hōteishiki	Raika Hara	POPQN	2
Hai Ōji to Kemono Hime no Gunki	Hirohiko Tashiro	Sumihei	1
Haken no Kōki Altina	Yukiya Murasaki	Himesuz	14
Harem e no Kiyoku Tadashiki Route	Mizuki Nomura	Miho Takeoka	3
Hariko no Otome	Zeroki	Yuni Yukimura	6
High School Loreley Unmei no Hito to Mimihore	Yōtarō Shida	Mitsuki	1
Hikaru ga Chikyū ni Itakoro	Mizuki Nomura	Miho Takeoka	10
Himajin, Maō no Sugata de Isekai e	Atsushi Ai	Yoshiaki Katsurai	5
Hōkago no Tosyoshitsu de Oshitoyakana Kanojo no Yuzurenai Rabukome	Kuyō	Fly	1

=== I ===
Title	Author	Illustrator	No. of volumes
Ichijō Asuna no Chikyū Rengō	Ryusei Shidō	Sacraneco	1
Idai naru Daigensui no Tenshin	Hazuki Takeoka	Tomozo	2
Ikkyū Tensai no Kiwamete Fuhoni na Meisuiri	Kazuma Ōtorino	Akaringo	2
Inu to Hasami wa Tsukaiyō	Shunsuke Sarai	Tetsuhiro Nabeshima	10
Inu to Hasami wa Tsukaiyō Dog Ears	Shunsuke Sarai	Tetsuhiro Nabeshima	4
Isekai de Hunter Hajimemashita.: Emono wa Oishiku Itadakimasu	Rin Yūki	Ryūta Fuse	2
Isekai desu ga Mamono Saibai shiteimasu.	Setsugetsuka	Shri	2
Isekai Harem ga Ore ni Kyūkyoku no Sentaku wo Ottekita	Haru Hakua	Koban Sameda	1
Isekai Kenkokuki	Sakura Sakuragi	Runa	2
Isekai Madō Kojoten	Mugichatarō Nenjū	Yūnagi	2
Isekai Shōkan ga Ōsugite Megami-sama ga Buchigiremashita	Mukai Yudate	Ichiyan	1
Isekai Supermarket o Eigyō Shimasu	Satoshi Kashiwagi	Nakabayashi Reimei	2
Iseki Shugosha	Aya Uduki	RIHO	1
Itan no Shingen Tsukai: Oretachi no Power Word de Isekai o Kakumei suru	Ryō Satō	Kurihito Mutō	2
Ixiano Ikusa Monogatari: Kokurōkyō to Tengan no Gunshi	Kazuma Ōtorino	Zin Arima	1

=== J ===
Title	Author	Illustrator	No. of volumes
Jingai Makyō	Norimitsu Kaihō	Namaniku ATK	2

=== K ===
Title	Author	Illustrator	No. of volumes
Kaimonjū no Gaikōkan to, Ryū no Kuni no Taishikan	Fukami Makoto	Merontomari	1
Kanpani Girls	Sow Kamishiro	Maro Fal	2
Kantai Collection - KanColle - Kagerou, Batsubyō Shimasu!	Toshihiko Tsukiji	NOCO	7
Karakuri Onigami Akatsuki	Ichirō Sakaki	Tony Taka	2
Karuma no Folklore	Hajime Tsukimoto	Fal Maro	1
Kemomusu Shōtai ni Yarukinashi Shireikan ga Chakunin Shimashita.	Tetsurou Mikado	Kona	1
Kenja no Mago	Tsuyoshi Yoshioka	Seiji Kikuchi	6
Kill Milu Katalu	Tomoka Hiiro	ukyo_rst	1
Kinki no Karma to Seiyaku no Himegimi	Iko Torimura	Satoru Arikawa	1
Kirawaremono Hajimemashita	Tarō Kuma	Karei	1
Kokoro Connect	Sadanatsu Anda	Shiromizakana	11
Kono Koi to, sono Mirai.	Bingo Morihashi	Nardack	5
Kōtetsu no Quadriga			1
Kuro no Hiera-Glaphicos	Akihiko Ureshino	Ruria Miyuki	13
Kuroraido ni Shizumu	Akira Ogata	ODESSA	1
Kurosaki Mayu no Hitomi ni Utsuru Utsukushii Sekai	Yu Kudo	Hanekoto	2
Kusuguri Tōshi no Zero Rumble	Asamaru Nishina	Mojarin	1
Kyōran Kazoku Nikki	Akira	x6suke	24
Kyō ga Saigo Hito da toshitemo	Sadanatsu Anda	Mieko Hosoi	2
Kyūketsuki ni Natta Kimi ha Eien no Ai o Hajimeru	Mizuki Nomura	Miho Takeoka	5

=== L ===
Title	Author	Illustrator	No. of volumes
Lady!? Steady, GO!!	Kenji Inoue	Shin Maru	1
Leadale no Daichi nite	Ceez	Tenmaso	5
Legal Fantasy	Ryosuke Hata	Kazutomo Miya	1
Lost: Kaze no Uta ga Kikoeru	Kurō Ikebe	Yuki Sakura	2
Lugal Gigam	Yoshiaki Inaba	toi8	2

=== M ===
Title	Author	Illustrator	No. of volumes
Mackenzie Eleanor no Fringe Laboratory	Ichirō Sakaki	Chiri	1
Magician's Academy	Ichirō Sakaki	Blade	9 + 5 short story collections
Mahōtsukai de hikikomori?	M Kotoriya	Tobe Sunaho	9 + 1 side story
Majo no Zettai Dōtoku	Kisetsu Morita	NOCO	2
Maōgoroshi to Itsuwari no Yūsha	Hirohiko Tashiro	Ginta	2
Megami no Yūsha wo Taosu Gesu na Hōhō	Sakuma Sasaki	Asagi Toosaka	6
Meikyoku no Almaine	Toshihiko Tsukiji	Fruits Punch	4
Meikyū Toshi no Antique Shop	Hatotarō Ōba	Ginta	3
Mimikari Neruri	Hiroshi Ishikawa	Uki	3
Mojo-kai no Futekisetsu na Nichijō	Reiji Kaitō	Aka Akasaka	3
Monogusa Neneko no Taida na Tanteichō		Hisasi	1
Monster Hunter	Gorō Seino	Ryūichi Sadamatsu	3
Monster Hunter: Akatsuki no Chikai	Kazuaki Emoto		6
Monster Hunter Frontier: Shakunetsu no Yaiba			2
Musubuto Hon. "Geka Shitsu" no Itto	Mizuki Nomura	Miho Takeoka	1
Muv-Luv Alternative: Schwarzesmarken	Hiroki Uchida	Carnelian	7

=== N ===
Title	Author	Illustrator	No. of volumes
Naita Tori no Yukusaki wa	Tōzai Yōno	Mitsuki Koyoi	1
Nanatsuiro Drops	Tamaki Ichikawa	Noizi Ito	1
Naraku Eiyū no Rebellion	Shūya Asanagi	Yūnagi	2
Neet na Maō to Tsundere Yūsha		Sakura Miwabe	1

=== O ===
Title	Author	Illustrator	No. of volumes
Oretachi wa Isekai ni Ittara Mazu Massaki ni Butsuri Hōsoku o Kakunin suru	Kaname Atsuki	Gekka Uruu	4
Ore yori Tsuyoi Ano Ko o Naguri ni Iku		Senmu	1
Ōsako Kōkō Dungeon-bu!	Mitsuru Abu	Minori Fuyuzora	1

=== P ===
Title	Author	Illustrator	No. of volumes
Panatea Itan	Takeoka Hazuki	Runa	5
Petopeto-san	Kou Kimura	Yug	5
Psycome	Mizuki Mizushiro	Namanie	6

=== R ===
Title	Author	Illustrator	No. of volumes
Ryūgajō Nanana no Maizōkin	Kazuma Ōtorino	Aka Ringo, Non	10
Ryūgoroshi no Gunshi: To Aru Sagishi no Eiyūtan	Ryōsuke Hata	Marimo	1
Ryūkishi kara Hajimeru Kuni Tsukuri	Inubukuro	Niritsu	1
Ryūsei Gakuen no Lost Night	Yū Hibiki	Merontomari	2

=== S ===
Title	Author	Illustrator	No. of volumes
Saeki-san to, Hitotsu Yane no Shita	Kuyō	Fly	1
Saishin no Mahō Tsukai to AI wo Shiru Mono	GODO	Yoichi Asano	1
Sawatari-san Chi no Ragnarok	Sennendō Taguchi	Yūji Himukai	1
Schwarzesmarken Sekiei no Bernhard	Hiroki Uchida	Auru Mimizuku	2
Seiōken to Ushinawareta Ryūhime	Tetsurō Mikado	Rin Hagiwara	2
Sekai no Kiki wa Mekurumeku	Ryō Satō	Takuya Fujima	8
Seneen no Gran	Takaaki Kaima	Akinaie	1
Sennen Sensō Aigis: Gekka no Hanayome	Yū Hibiki	Itsuwa Katō	5
Shinonome Yūko wa Tanpen Shōsetsu o Aishiteiru	Bingo Morihashi	Nardack	3
Shitayomi Danshi to Tōkō Joshi	Mizuki Nomura	Eihi	1
Sōsei no Ebriot Seed	Kazuya Ikezaki	Tera Akai	1
Suisei no Gargantia	Daishiro Tanimura, Gen Urobuchi	Akiko Murayama	3
Suisei no Gargantia: Haruka, Kaikō no Tenchi	Daishiro Tanimura	Hanaharu Naruko	2
Suzumin wa Nikushokukei Karyu	Gorou Seino	Anapon	3

=== T ===
Title	Author	Illustrator	No. of volumes
Tales of Zestiria	Sawako Hirabayashi	Ufotable	2
Tegs no Meikyū Tanbōroku	Tyu-moji	Gekka Uruu	3
Tenkeiteki Isekai Tenseitan	Usubaa	Nyanya	3
Tensei no Kafka Tsukai	Tomoyasu Higa	Zerokichi	1

=== U ===
Title	Author	Illustrator	No. of volumes
Ubau Mono Ubawareru Mono	Mino	Kazutake Hazano	8
Uosato Kōkō Dungeon-bu!	Mitsuru Abu	Minori Fuyuzora	2
Usui to Kanojo to Roku-san no.	Kei Aramoto	Vania 600	1
Utae Canaria	Masami Molockchi	Shibamoto Thores	1
Utsuro na Assassin to Kyūkyoku no Sekai Ningyō	Kō Maisaka	Mantarō Mitsuki	1

=== V ===
Title	Author	Illustrator	No. of volumes
Villains Tail	Keishi Ayasato	Riraru	1

=== W ===
Title	Author	Illustrator	No. of volumes
Waga Itsuwari no Na no Moto ni Tsudoe, Hoshiboshi	Takashi Shōji	Sime	1

=== Y ===
Title	Author	Illustrator	No. of volumes
Yoru-hime to Bōkoku no Roku Kishi	Kou Maisaka	Ko-cha	4
Yoshinaga-san Chi no Gargoyle	Sennendou Taguchi		15
Yōkai Hyakki-tan!	Takaaki Kaima	Om	1
Yūsha Datta Ore wa Osananajimi no Shitsuji ni Narimashita.	Shōta Tatsuza	Benio	1

=== Z ===
Title	Author	Illustrator	No. of volumes
Zoku: Monogusa Neneko no Taida na Tantei-jō	Kō Maisaka	Hisasi	1
