= Ryōki Nagae =

Japanese actor

- Born: August 26, 1998 (age 27); Osaka, Japan
- Occupation: Actor
- Years active: 2008–present
- Agent: Avex Management
- Notable work: Hetalia; Bungo Stray Dogs
- Height: 169 cm (5 ft 7 in)

Ryōki Nagae (Japanese: 長江 崚行, Nagae Ryouki; born August 26, 1998) is a Japanese actor and singer represented by Avex Management. He is best known for his role as Italy in the musicals Hetalia, and Edogawa Ranpo in the stage plays Bungo Stray Dogs.

== Filmography ==
=== Television ===
- Tensai TV-kun MAX (2009–2012) – TV Warrior
- 2.5D NAVI (2019 – ) – Regular appearance
- Sengoku Nabe TV (2020) – Mori Nagatakashi
- Tsukai TV Sukatto Japan (2020) – Yamaji Tsuyoshi
- Osanai Brothers (2020) – Shirafuji Katsuki

=== Stage Play ===
- Legend of the Galactic Heroes – Julian Mintz
  - Legend of the Galactic Heroes – Chapter Three – Civil War (2013)
  - Legend of the Galactic Heroes – Chapter Four Part One – Crash Eve (2014)
  - Legend of the Galactic Heroes – Special Performance – Star Trail (2015)
- Satomi Hakkenden (2014) – Fusahachi
- Musical Hetalia – Italy
  - Musical Hetalia – Singin’ in the World (2015)
  - Musical Hetalia – The Great World (2016)
  - Musical Hetalia – In the New World (2017)
  - Musical Hetalia – The world is wonderful (2021)
  - Musical Hetalia – The Fantastic World (2023)
  - Musical Hetalia – The Glorious World (2024)
  - Musical Hetalia – A Tender World (2025)
- Psycome; Stage (2016) – Kamiya Kyosuke
- Masuda Kosuke Theater “Good Day for Gag Manga” Deluxe Flavor (2016) – Ono no Imoko
- Geten no Hana Yume Akari (2016) – Takenaka Hanbei
- Ace Attorney Investigations (2016) – Takanashi Mamoru
- Whistle! BREAK THROUGH – Break through the wall (2016) – Toyama Ippei
- Gokujo Bungaku “Human Chair/The conjurer” (2016) – Fumiyo
- Stage play “Messiah Project” – Miike Mayo
  - Messiah – Akatsuki no Toki (2017)
  - Messiah – Yuukyuu no Toki (2017)
  - Messiah – Tsukuyomi no Toki (2018)
  - Messiah – Twilight – Kokon no Arano (2019)
  - Messiah – Reimei no Toki (2019)
- Stage play MONSTER LIVE! (2017)
- Stage play “King of Prism” – Kogami Taiga
  - KING OF PRISM – Over the Sunshine! (2017)
  - KING OF PRISM – Shiny Rose Stars (2020)
- Bungo Stray Dogs – Edogawa Ranpo
  - Bungo Stray Dogs (2018)
  - Bungo Stray Dogs – Kuro no Jidai (2018)
  - Bungo Stray Dogs – Sansha Teiritsu (2019)
  - Bungo Stray Dogs – Hajigaki Tanteisha Setsuritsu Hiwa (2020)
- Stage play “Hiragana Danshi” (2018) – Ne
- Musical “Mata kanarazu aou – to daremo ga itta” (2018) – Akitsuki Kazuya
- Stage play “Tougenkyou Labyrinth” (2019) – Sakata Ginga
- Theatrical Company Animeza – Butai no kodo ha ai – (2019) – Tatsuma
- Musical “Indigo Tomato” (2019) – Mamoru
- Tensai TV-kun the STAGE – TV Warrior REBORN (2020) – Nagae Ryoki
- Stage play “RE:CLAIM” (2020) – Hatori (Performances cancelled due COVID-19)
- Stage play “12 Angry men” (2020) – Jury No.1
- Musical "Houshin engi – Kaisen no Prelude" (2020) – Inkō
- Reading Drama "5 years after" (2020)
- Musical “DREAM!ing” (2020) – Shishimaru Takatomi
- Stage play "Aoyama Operetta" (2021) – Miyajima Asahi
- Reading Drama "5 years after"

=== Movies ===
- Messiah Project Gaiden – Kyokuya Polar night (2017) – Miike Mayo
- Togenkyo Labyrinth (2019) – Sakata Ginga

=== Live Concerts ===
- Club INSPIRE VJ Gou Presents Event (2016, 2017)
- Live “STAGE FES” –Stage play “KING OF PRISM” – Kogami Taiga
  - STAGE FES 2017
  - STAGE FES 2018
  - STAGE FES 2019
- Musical “Hetalia FINAL LIVE – A World in the Universe -” (2018) – Italy
- Musical “Hetalia 10th Anniversary – The World Concert -” (2026) – Italy
- Stage play “KING OF PRISM – Rose Party on STAGE 2019” (2019) – Kogami Taiga

=== WEB shows ===
- Don't you work part-time? Tenju-kun (2019) – Shirafuji Katsuki
- peep “Nurarihyon no sumu ie” (2020) – Oyamada Kazuhiro
