= Magi-Cu =

Japanese manga magazine

- Magi-Cu vol. 38 cover.
- Categories: Shōnen/Seinen Manga
- Frequency: Monthly
- First issue: April 27, 2001 (as Magi-Cu Premium)
- Final issue: June 25, 2007
- Company: Enterbrain
- Country: Japan
- Based in: Tokyo
- Language: Japanese
- Website: Official website

Magi-Cu (マジキュー, Majikyū) was a Japanese manga magazine published by Enterbrain and was sold monthly on the twenty-fifth. The name comes from the phrase Magical Cute. The magazine was first published on April 27, 2001, under the title Magi-Cu Premium. It kept that title for three years until 2004, when it was changed to simply Magi-Cu. On June 25, 2007, Magi-Cu published its last issue at volume forty.

== Magazine content ==
=== Reader participations games ===
- Bottle Fairy
- Duel Dolls
- Full Throttle Halation!: Hoshi ni Negai wo
- Heart Mark!
- Koromo Yūgi
- Lovely Idol
- Neko no Sakaue
- Otsukai Blade: Kuro Kishi Monogatari
- Rune Princess
- Town Memory
- Tsungri! Hontō wa Tsundere na Grimm Dōwa
- World's end

=== Manga ===
- 5 Kai Bishōjo Kaden Uriba de Gozaimasu
- Bad! Daddy
- Food Girls
- Maoyuu 4-Koma - Muitemasen yo, Maou-sama!
- Magi Kyūdō
- Kirin Chō Bōei Gumi
- Otome wa Boku ni Koishiteru
- Petopeto-san
- Sukusuku Suisui
- Urekko Dōbutsu
- Gargoyle of Yoshinaga House

=== Light novels ===
- Chōmai Taisen Sismagedon
- Magician's Academy
