= Arasa ga VTuber ni Natta Hanashi =

Japanese light novel series

- First light novel volume cover

アラサーがVTuberになった話。
- Genre: Comedy
- Novel series
- Written by: Tokumei
- Published by: Hameln; Shōsetsuka ni Narō; Kakuyomu
- Original run: April 19, 2020 – present
- Light novel
- Written by: Tokumei
- Illustrated by: Karasu BTK
- Published by: Enterbrain
- Imprint: Famitsu Bunko
- Original run: September 30, 2022 – present
- Volumes: 8 + 1 side story
- Manga
- Written by: Tokumei
- Illustrated by: Sekihiko Inui
- Published by: Kadokawa Shoten
- Magazine: KadoComi
- Original run: May 25, 2024 – present
- Volumes: 5

Arasa ga VTuber ni Natta Hanashi (アラサーがVTuberになった話。) is a Japanese light novel series written by Tokumei and illustrated by Karasu BTK. It began serialization as a web novel published on Hameln in April 2020, on Shōsetsuka ni Narō in November of the same year, and on Kakuyomu in February 2021. It was later acquired by Enterbrain who began publishing it under their Famitsu Bunko light novel imprint in September 2022. A manga adaptation illustrated by Sekihiko Inui began serialization on Kadokawa Shoten's KadoComi manga website in May 2024.

== Media ==
=== Light novel ===
Written by Tokumei, Arasa ga VTuber ni Natta Hanashi began serialization on Hameln on April 19, 2020, on Shōsetsuka ni Narō on November 12 of the same year, and on Kakuyomu on February 2, 2021. Enterbrain acquired the series and began publishing it with illustrations by Karasu BTK under their Famitsu Bunko light novel imprint on September 30, 2022. Eight volumes and a side story volume have been released as of April 2026.

No.	Release date	ISBN
1	September 30, 2022	978-4-04-737197-2
2	February 28, 2023	978-4-04-737378-5
3	July 28, 2023	978-4-04-737577-2
4	February 28, 2024	978-4-04-737763-9
5	September 30, 2024	978-4-04-738046-2
SS	September 30, 2024	978-4-04-738047-9
6	March 28, 2025	978-4-04-738299-2
7	September 29, 2025	978-4-04-738541-2
8	April 30, 2026	978-4-04-738811-6

=== Manga ===
A manga adaptation illustrated by Sekihiko Inui began serialization on Kadokawa Shoten's KadoComi manga website on May 25, 2024. The manga's chapters have been collected into five tankōbon volumes as of July 2026.

No.	Release date	ISBN
1	October 7, 2024	978-4-04-811381-6
2	April 7, 2025	978-4-04-811478-3
3	August 6, 2025	978-4-04-811646-6
4	January 7, 2026	978-4-04-811770-8
5	July 7, 2026	978-4-04-811992-4

== Reception ==
The series won the first place in the overall new work category of the "Light Novel News Online Awards September 2022 Edition". The series was ranked second in the tankōbon category in the 2022 Next Light Novel Awards and fifth in the same category in the 2023 edition. It was also ranked ninth in the 2024 edition of Takarajimasha's Kono Light Novel ga Sugoi! guidebook in the tankōbon category.
