= Kamisama Game =

Japanese light novel series

神様ゲーム (Kamisama Gēmu)
- Genre: Fantasy, Romantic comedy
- Light novel
- Written by: Shū Miyazaki
- Illustrated by: Nanakusa
- Published by: Kadokawa Shoten
- Imprint: Kadokawa Sneaker Bunko
- Magazine: The Sneaker
- Original run: June 30, 2005 – present
- Volumes: 7 + 3 (short stories)
- Manga
- Written by: Shū Miyazaki
- Illustrated by: Takumi Yoshimura
- Published by: Kadokawa Shoten
- Magazine: Monthly Asuka
- Original run: October 24, 2007 – present
- Volumes: 1

Kamisama Game (神様ゲーム; "God Game") is a Japanese light novel series by Shū Miyazaki, with illustrations by Nanakusa. The first novel was released on June 30, 2005, and as of August 1, 2008, seven volumes have been published by Kadokawa Shoten under their Kadokawa Sneaker Bunko imprint. Three volumes of short story compilations were also published between September 1, 2006, and June 1, 2008. Stories from the novel series have been serialized in Kadokawa Shoten's light novel magazine The Sneaker. In Kadokawa Shoten's first Light Novel Award contest held in 2007, the first volume of Kamisama Game was one of three runners-up in the romantic comedy category. A manga adaptation illustrated by Takumi Yoshimura began serialization in Kadokawa Shoten's shōjo manga magazine Monthly Asuka on October 24, 2007. The first manga bound volume was released by Kadokawa Shoten on July 26, 2008.
