= Psycome =

Japanese light novel series

- First light novel volume cover.

サイコメ (Saikome)
- Light novel
- Written by: Mizuki Misushiro
- Illustrated by: Namanie
- Published by: Enterbrain
- English publisher: NA: Yen Press
- Imprint: Famitsu Bunko
- Original run: February 28, 2013 – August 30, 2014
- Volumes: 6

Psycome (サイコメ, Saikome) is a Japanese light novel series written by Mizuki Mizushiro, with illustrations by Namanie. Enterbrain published six novels between February 2013 and August 2014 under Famitsu Bunko imprint. Yen Press licensed the light novels and released them in English in North America between June 2016 and February 2018.

== Plot ==
After being sentenced on false charges, Kyousuke Kamiya enrolls in a school for juvenile convicts.

== Characters ==
- Kyousuke Kamiya: The main protagonist. A 15-year-old boy with strong combat skills framed for the murder of twelve high school bullies. He gets used to life at the penitentiary very quickly and is exceptionally loyal to the friends he makes there as well as his sister, who, unknown to him, has romantic feelings towards him.
- Renko Hikawa: A 16-year-old girl from class 1-B who wears a gas mask to seal her true nature. Initially appearing as sweet, innocent, clueless, and slightly pervy, soon her true nature is revealed as an extreme yandere who views murder and torture as an act of love. After being rejected by Kyousuke, she still admits being in love with him and promises to protect him at all costs because she wants to be the one who kills him. After the events of the Summer Death Camp, she had developed an extreme fear of snakes due to Mr. Busujima's "discipline".
- Maina Igarashi: A 15-year-old girl from class 1-A who is shy and easily frightened by acts of violence and criminals, but unintentionally commits physical violence on others whenever she trips and falls. Even though she's the same age as Kyousuke and Akabane, she looks and acts much, much younger. Her cooking is also notable for being so mind-numbingly vile that it acts more like a toxic poison when ingested. She initially fears Kyousuke after hearing about the crime he was framed for, but warms up to him after he saves her from a gang of rapists.
- Eiri Akabane: A 15-year-old girl from class 1-A who claims she killed six people due to her career as a hitman. Her weapons of choice are her fingernails, which contain hidden razor blades designed for slitting throats. She acts slightly cold to Kyousuke at first and is disgusted whenever he stares at a girl's chest, despite the fact she frequently stares at his crotch. After Kyousuke is severely injured by his homeroom teacher, she reveals her story about killing six people was bogus, and her parents sent her to the school due to her reluctance of killing others.
- Kuuga Makyouin: A 16-year-old boy from class 1-B who speaks in a bombastic manner and believes his left arm is a living monster who he dubbed 'Azreal'. He covers nearly his entire left arm with black tape and frequently screams at his arm when he has an urge to kill. He is surprisingly good at cooking, as his family is a long line of restaurant owners. He is one of Renko's teammates during the Summer Death Camp.
- Chihiro Andou: A 14-year-old girl from class 1-B who cannibalizes humans, both living and dead, and is notable for her piranha-like teeth. She made a deal with Renko to cannibalize Kyousuke after Renko kills him because "his taste is special". She is one of Renko's teammates during the Summer Death Camp.
- BOB: A 16-year-old girl from class 1-B with a monstrous physique and hoarse voice, but is actually one of the most gentle hearted in the academy. She always wears a flower sack over her head, and her true name is unknown. After being rejected by Kyousuke, she promises to support Renko in her efforts to be Kyousuke's bride. She is one of Renko's teammates in the Summer Death Camp.
- Saki Shamaya: A 17-year-old girl from class 1-C who works as the "Public Morals Committee" chairman. When she was younger, she became notorious as the "Killer Queen" after she murdered twenty-one people, including her own parents, simply because she enjoyed doing it. She speaks in a refined tone and pattern and laughs haughtily, but is actually much more vulgar and perverted than she lets on. During the Summer Death Camp, she develops a strong crush on Kyousuke for saving her from Renko, but also develops a strong fear for Renko due to her nature.
- Ayaka Kamiya: Kyousuke's 12-year-old sister who has an extreme brother complex and transfers into his class after attempting to murder her own classmates. Even though she was generally viewed as an almost-too-perfect little sister, she is actually as psychopathic as Renko and twice as obsessed with Kyousuke. She was generally rude and violent towards any girl who got near Kyousuke, but started opening up to others after the shoe locker shotgun incident.

== Volume list ==
No.	Original release date	Original ISBN	English release date	English ISBN
1	February 28, 2013	978-4-04-728729-7	June 21, 2016	978-0-31-627233-9
2	April 30, 2013	978-4-04-728853-9	October 25, 2016	978-0-316-39825-1
3	August 30, 2013	978-4-04-729096-9	February 21, 2017	978-0-31-639826-8
4	December 26, 2013	978-4-04-729323-6	June 20, 2017	978-0-31-639830-5
5	April 28, 2014	978-4-04-729597-1	October 31, 2017	978-0-31-639832-9
6	August 20, 2014	978-4-04-729862-0	February 20, 2018	978-0-31-639835-0

Psycome: Unplagued Omnibus

No.	Release date	ISBN
1	November 29, 2014	978-4-04-730054-5

== Reception ==
Rebecca Silverman of Anime News Network gave the first volume an overall B− rating, including a B− rating for the story and a B rating for the art.
