= Book Girl =

Japanese light novel series

- Cover art of Book Girl and the Suicidal Mime, the first light novel in the collection, published by Enterbrain, showing Tohko Amano.

文学少女 (Bungaku Shōjo)
- Genre: Mystery
- Light novel
- Written by: Mizuki Nomura
- Illustrated by: Miho Takeoka
- Published by: Enterbrain
- English publisher: Yen Press
- Imprint: Famitsu Bunko
- Original run: April 28, 2006 – April 30, 2011
- Volumes: 16
- Manga

Book Girl and the Suicidal Mime
- Written by: Mizuki Nomura
- Illustrated by: Rito Kōsaka
- Published by: Square Enix
- Magazine: Gangan Powered; Gangan Joker
- Original run: August 2008 – November 2010
- Volumes: 3
- Manga

Book Girl and the Delicious Recipe
- Written by: Mizuki Nomura
- Illustrated by: Akira Hiyoshimaru
- Published by: Kadokawa Shoten
- Magazine: Beans Ace; Monthly Asuka
- Original run: December 10, 2008 – April 2010
- Volumes: 2
- Original video animation

Book Girl Today's Snack: First Love
- Directed by: Shunsuke Tada
- Studio: Production I.G
- Released: December 26, 2009
- Manga

Book Girl and the Lovesick Poet
- Written by: Mizuki Nomura
- Illustrated by: Akira Hiyoshimaru
- Published by: Kadokawa Shoten
- Magazine: Monthly Asuka
- Original run: June 2010 – January 2011
- Volumes: 1
- Original video animation

Book Girl Memoir
- Directed by: Shunsuke Tada
- Studio: Production I.G
- Released: June 25, 2010 – December 24, 2010
- Episodes: 3
- Manga

Book Girl and the Famished Spirit
- Written by: Mizuki Nomura
- Illustrated by: Rito Kōsaka
- Published by: Square Enix
- Magazine: Gangan Joker
- Original run: January 2011 – September 2013
- Volumes: 4
- Other
- Book Girl (film)
- icon

Book Girl (文学少女, Bungaku Shōjo; lit. Literature Girl) is a collection of Japanese light novels by Mizuki Nomura, with illustrations by Miho Takeoka. The series contains 16 volumes: eight cover the original series, four are short story collections, and four are of a side story. The novels were published between April 2006 and April 2011 by Enterbrain under their Famitsu Bunko imprint. Yen Press licensed the light novel series and began releasing it in English in North America in July 2010. There have been four manga adaptations serialized in Square Enix's shōnen Gangan Powered and Gangan Joker, and Kadokawa Shoten's shōjo Beans Ace and Monthly Asuka. An anime film adaptation produced by Production I.G was released in Japanese theaters on May 1, 2010.

== Plot ==
The Book Girl series centers around Konoha Inoue, one of two members of his high school's literature club, which he joined shortly after entering school, though the story begins when Konoha is already in his second year. The other member and president of the club is Tohko Amano, a third-year girl who loves literature. Tohko is a yōkai who eats stories by consuming the paper they are printed on, and Tohko often asks Konoha to write her short stories as "snacks".

== Characters ==
Konoha Inoue (井上 心葉, Inoue Konoha)
Voiced by: Miyu Irino
Konoha is a second-year in high school who gained prominence when he wrote and submitted a romance novel into a competition. He won, with the novel going on to becoming a bestseller, but since he used a girl's name as a pseudonym, no one knows it is him. He joins his school's literature club where he meets the president of the club, Tohko Amano.
Tohko Amano (天野 遠子, Amano Tōko)
Voiced by: Kana Hanazawa
Tohko is a third-year high school student and the president of the literature club. She and Konoha are the only members of the club. She eats the pages of stories as "snacks" and asks Konoha to sometimes write something for her so she can consume them.

== Media ==
=== Light novels and books ===
The Book Girl series of light novels are written by Mizuki Nomura, with illustrations by Miho Takeoka. The novels share the common title Book Girl (文学少女, Bungaku Shōjo), which is where the series gets its name. There are 16 novels in the series: eight cover the original series, four are short story collections, and four are of a side story. The eight novels of the original series were published between April 28, 2006, and August 30, 2008. The four short story collections were published between December 26, 2008, and December 25, 2010; many of the short stories were previously published in Enterbrain's FB Online online magazine. The four side story novels were published between April 30, 2009, and April 30, 2011. The first three side story novels are a part of a single story, while the last one is separate. The novels were published by Enterbrain under their Famitsu Bunko imprint. Yen Press licensed the light novel series and began releasing it in English in North America in July 2010.

A 127-page art book titled Book Girl's Art Gallery ("文学少女"の追想画廊(ガレリア・デ・アール), Bungaku Shōjo no Tsuisō Garō (Galerie d'art)) was published on December 15, 2008, by Enterbrain. Along with illustrations, the book contained a Book Girl short story and comments by the creators. Three more books were published on April 21, 2010, by Enterbrain. These include another 63-page art book titled Book Girl Fantasy Art Book; a 159-page guide book titled Book Girl's Gourmet Books Guide ("文学少女"のグルメな図書ガイド, Bungaku Shōjo no Gourmet na Tosho Guide) and a 111-page guide book released for the film titled Book Girl Film Edition: Appetizer (劇場版"文学少女" -appetizer-, Gekijōban Bungaku Shōjo -appetizer-). The guide book came bundled with a bonus DVD containing cast comments and making-of videos. Another art book titled Book Girl's Art Gallery 2 ("文学少女"の追想画廊2, Bungaku Shōjo no Tsuisō Garō 2 (Galerie d'art)) was published on May 30, 2011, by Enterbrain. Nomura collaborated with Kenji Inoue (the author of Baka to Test to Shōkanjū) and Takaaki Kaima (the author of Gakkō no Kaidan) to produce three stories in Collaboration Anthology 2: Book Girl Ascends the Stairway of the Gargoyles and Idiots (コラボアンソロジー2 "文学少女"はガーゴイルとバカの階段を昇る, Corabo Ansorojī 2 Bungaku Shōjo wa Gāgoiru to Baka no Kaidan o Noboru) published by Enterbrain on October 30, 2008.

=== Manga ===
Four manga adaptations of Book Girl were created. The first, titled Book Girl and the Suicidal Mime ("文学少女"と死にたがりの道化, Bungaku Shōjo to Shinitagari no Piero), is illustrated by Rito Kōsaka and began serialization in the August 2008 issue of Square Enix's shōnen manga magazine Gangan Powered. The manga was transferred to the debut May 2009 issue of Square Enix's Gangan Joker magazine after Gangan Powered was discontinued with the April 2009 issue. It ran until the November 2010 issue. Three tankōbon volumes were released between April 24, 2009, and December 22, 2010, under Square Enix's Gangan Comics Joker imprint. Kōsaka began another manga titled Book Girl and the Famished Spirit ("文学少女"と飢え渇く幽霊, Bungaku Shōjo to Uekawaku Gōsuto) serialized in Gangan Joker between the January 2011 and September 2013 issues. Four volumes for Famished Spirit were released between August 22, 2011, and November 22, 2013.

The third manga, Book Girl and the Delicious Recipe ("文学少女"と美味しい噺, Bungaku Shōjo to Oishii Reshipi), is illustrated by Akira Hiyoshimaru and the first four chapters were serialized in Kadokawa Shoten's shōjo manga Beans Ace magazine. It was transferred to Monthly Asuka after Beans Ace was discontinued with the November 2009 issue. Delicious Recipe was serialized between the September 2009 and April 2010 issues of Monthly Asuka. Two volumes were published for Delicious Recipe on January 26 and April 26, 2010, under Kadokawa's Asuka Comics DX imprint. Hiyoshimaru illustrated another manga titled Book Girl and the Lovesick Poet ("文学少女"と恋する詩人, Bungaku Shōjo to Koisuru Poet) in Monthly Asuka between the June 2010 and January 2011 issues. A single volume for Lovesick Poet was released on January 26, 2011.

=== Drama CDs and radio show ===
A set of six drama CDs were produced by Lantis covering three stories in two volumes each. The two-volume adaptation of the first light novel Book Girl and the Suicidal Mime were released on October 21 and November 25, 2009. The two-volume adaptation of the second novel Book Girl and the Famished Spirit were released on February 24 and March 24, 2010. The two-volume adaptation of the third novel Book Girl and the Captive Fool were released on September 22 and November 24, 2010.

An Internet radio show to promote Book Girl titled Radio Book Girl: The Literary Club at Midnight (ラジオ"文学少女"〜真夜中の文芸部〜, Rajio Bungaku Shōjo: Mayonaka no Bungeibu) aired 52 episodes between January 9, 2010, and January 1, 2011. The show was produced by Chō! A&G+ and Lantis Web Radio. It was streamed online weekly and was hosted by Kana Hanazawa, the voice of Tohko Amano in the drama CDs and anime adaptations.

=== Anime ===
A 103-minute anime film adaptation titled Book Girl was produced by Production I.G, directed by Shunsuke Tada, and was released in Japanese theaters on May 1, 2010. The film was produced as a commemoration of Enterbrain's ten-year anniversary. The film was released to Blu-ray Disc/DVD on August 27, 2010, by Pony Canyon.

A bonus original video animation (OVA) titled Book Girl Today's Snack: First Love ("文学少女"今日のおやつ 〜はつ恋〜, Bungaku Shōjo Kyō no Oyatsu: Hatsukoi) was bundled with a limited-edition version of the second side story novel volume Book Girl Apprentice's Heartbreak ("文学少女"見習いの、傷心, Bungaku Shōjo Minarai no, Shōshin) sold on December 26, 2009. The OVA was produced by the same staff as the anime film.

Three OVA shorts under the collective title Book Girl Memoir ("文学少女"メモワール, Bungaku Shōjo Memowāru) were produced to be shown before the film's screening for one-week intervals beginning in May 2010. The OVAs cover stories primarily about three of the main characters: Tohko Amano for volume one, Miu Asakura for volume two, and Nanase Kotobuki for volume three. Tohko's OVA, "Prelude to the Dream Girl" (夢見る少女の前奏曲(プレリュード), Yumemiru Shōjo no Prelude), was shown between May 15 and May 21, 2010; a DVD containing the OVA was released on June 25, 2010. Miu's OVA, titled "Requiem of the Sky Dancing Angel" (ソラ舞う天使の鎮魂曲(レクイエム), Sora Mau Tenshi no Requiem), was shown between May 22 and May 28, 2010; a DVD containing the OVA was sold on October 29, 2010. Nanase's OVA, titled "Rhapsody of the Maiden in Love" (恋する乙女の狂想曲(ラプソディ), Koisuru Otome no Rhapsody), was shown between May 29 and June 4, 2010; a DVD containing the OVA was released on December 24, 2010.

==== Music ====
An image song album titled Bungaku Shōjo to Yumeutsutsu no Melody ("文学少女"と夢現の旋律, Book Girl and the Half Asleep Melody) was released at Comiket 76 on August 14, 2009, with songs by Annabel, CooRie, Eufonius, Masumi Itō, Kokia, and Kukui. The film's theme song is "Haruka na Hibi" (遥かな日々, Distant Days) by Eufonius; the single was released on May 1, 2010. The original soundtrack titled Musique du film, composed by Masumi Itō, was released by Lantis on May 1, 2010. The opening theme song for the three OVA shorts is "Musō Garden" (夢想庭園, Musō Gāden; Garden of Dreams) by CooRie; the single was released on July 7, 2010. The "Prelude to the Dream Girl" OVA's ending theme is "Koto no Ha" (言の葉, Words) by Kokia; the song was released on the album Yumemiru Shōjo no Prelude on July 7, 2010. The "Requiem of the Sky Dancing Angel" OVA's ending theme is "Aozora no Mukō" (青空の向こう) by Masumi Itō; the song was released on the album Sora Mau Tenshi no Requiem on October 27, 2010. The "Rhapsody of the Maiden in Love" OVA's ending theme is "Hidamari Hakusho" (陽だまり白書) by CooRie; the song was released on the album Koisuru Otome no Rhapsody on January 26, 2011.

== Reception ==
The Mainichi Shimbun reported that by May 2010, over 1.6 million copies of the light novels had been sold in Japan. The light novel series has ranked five times in Takarajimasha's light novel guide book Kono Light Novel ga Sugoi! published yearly: eighth in 2007, third in 2008 and 2010, first in 2009, and sixth in 2011. In the 2009 issue of the guidebook, Tohko Amano was voted the No. 1 ranked female light novel character. In Kadokawa Shoten's Light Novel Award contest held in 2007, Book Girl and the Suicidal Mime won an award in the mystery category.

In a review of the first light novel Book Girl and the Suicidal Mime by Anime News Network contributor Carlo Santos, the author Mizuki Nomura is cited as being "too ambitious" for her use of several differing genres of storytelling, such as the use of mystery, character-driven comedy, and 20th-century Japanese literature. Santos notes how these subjects, while present, are not expounded upon, and several plot points are pointed out as being left open (because there are more novels). The murder-mystery portion is described as being "awkwardly written", which reads more like "plot summary than actual dialogue". The reviewer makes comparisons with the Haruhi Suzumiya light novel series in how Kyon and Haruhi Suzumiya are similar to the main characters Konoha Inoue and Tohko Amano from the Book Girl series. Santos further notes how the character-driven comedy is similar in style to that used in the Haruhi Suzumiya series.
