= Gargoyle of Yoshinaga House =

Japanese light novel series

- Cover of the first light novel

吉永さん家のガーゴイル (Gargoyle of Yoshinaga House)
- Genre: Comedy, light novel
- Light novel
- Written by: Sennendō Taguchi
- Illustrated by: Yuji Himukai
- Published by: Enterbrain
- Imprint: Famitsu Bunko
- Original run: January 23, 2004 – July 30, 2008
- Volumes: 15
- Manga
- Written by: Kagari Tamaoka
- Illustrated by: Tamaoka Kagari
- Published by: Enterbrain
- Magazine: Magi-Cu
- Original run: March 31, 2006 – February 25, 2008
- Volumes: 2
- Anime television series
- Directed by: Iku Suzuki
- Produced by: Saburo Omiya; Satoru Akahori
- Written by: Takao Yoshioka
- Music by: Kow Otani
- Studio: Studio Hibari
- Licensed by: Sentai Filmworks
- Original network: Chiba TV, Tokyo MX
- Original run: April 1, 2006 – June 24, 2006
- Episodes: 13
- Light novel

Gargoyle Alternative ガーゴイルおるたなてぃぶ
- Written by: Sennendō Taguchi
- Illustrated by: Yuji Himukai
- Published by: Enterbrain
- Imprint: Famitsu Bunko
- Original run: July 29, 2006 – January 30, 2009
- Volumes: 5

Gargoyle of Yoshinaga House (吉永さん家のガーゴイル, Yoshinaga-san Chi no Gargoyle) is a Japanese light novel series written by Sennendō Taguchi. It follows Kazumi Yoshinaga and his normal junior high school life, with younger sister Futaba Yoshinaga, who won a prize from a lottery of a wolf-like gargoyle nicknamed "Gar-kun".

The series was first published in 2004 by Famitsu Bunko (Enterbrain) in Japan. The series was adapted into an anime, which was broadcast on Chiba Television from April 4, 2006. It contained 13 episodes, with the last airing on June 24, 2006.

== Plot ==
In the fictional and peaceful town of Goshikichō, there lives a strange family named the Yoshinagas.

One day, the eldest daughter Futaba wins the third prize in a lottery held in the shopping district. It turns out to be a talking dog-shaped statue whose appearance changes the lives of the Yoshinaga family. He positions himself at the entrance of the Yoshinaga residence, challenging anyone who approaches. The increasing notoriety of the statue, and by extension her family, angers Futaba, leading her to wanting him gone. But after some time being with the Yoshinaga family, Gar-kun corrects his ways and people begin to consider him as the guardian of the town.

For the sake of protecting his newfound family, along with the help of eldest brother Kazumi and his creator Iyo, Gar-kun must contend with the various foes and hardships that befall the town of Goshikichō.

=== Gargoyle Alternative ===
In the fairly peaceful city of Inosaki, in an unsafe business district, there is a multi-tenant building called Isshiki Building. On the third floor, there lives a runaway apprentice alchemist called Hikaru. She works as a detective from her home-turned-office called the Henhouse with her living mithril statue nicknamed "Gar-suke."

One day, Hikaru receives a case from a recently established flower shop on the first floor of Isshiki Building. However, this only begins an intense battle with a group of old scientists called Mizuchi who are after the Balance of Rā that Hikaru created using her alchemy.

Hikaru, with fellow residents of the same building, stand together to crush Mizuchi's ambitions before they get what they want.

== Characters ==
=== Main characters ===
Gargoyle (ガーゴイル, Gargoyle, "Gar-kun")
Voiced by: Norio Wakamoto
The title character of the series. A living dog-shaped sculpture built by highly skilled alchemists, he protects the entrance to the Yoshinaga household.
Futaba Yoshinaga (吉永双葉, Yoshinaga Futaba)
Voiced by: Chiwa Saito
The only daughter and youngest member of the household. She is a boyish troublemaker who loves wrestling. In the beginning of the series, she dislikes Gargoyle.
Kazumi Yoshinaga (吉永和己, Yoshinaga Futaba)
Voiced by: Kouki Miyata
The older brother of Futaba. Due to his lack of masculinity, he is very often mistaken as a girl by strangers. He often steps in to prevent Futaba from causing more trouble.
Mimori Onodera (小野寺美森, Onodera Mimori)
Voiced by: Yūna Inamura
She is Futaba's friend. Her father is blind and led by a guide dog named Lieutenant Avery.
Lili Hamilton (梨々ハミルトン, Riri Hamiruton)
Voiced by: Nana Mizuki
Futaba's friend. Her father had been performing alchemy on her which allowed her to read people's minds and understand their feelings. She now lives with Kaitō Hyakushiki, who she calls Uncle.
Kaitō Hyakushiki (怪盗百色, Kaitō Hyakushiki)
Voiced by: Susumu Chiba
An extremely clever thief who can pull off several tricks and escape from tight situations. He is Lili's new guardian.

=== Secondary characters ===
Hikaru Higashimiya (東宮ひかる, Higashimiya Hikaru)
The main protagonist of the spin-off series Gargoyle Alternative (ガーゴイルおるたなてぃぶ). Runs a detective office called the Henhouse on the third floor of a multi-tenant building.
Iyo Takahara (高原イヨ, Takahara Iyo)
Voiced by: Houko Kuwashima
Creator of Gar-kun and owner of an antique shop.
Hisham (ヒッシャム, Hisshamu)
Voiced by: Takurō Nakakuni
An Egyptian alchemist. Creator of Osiris.
Osiris (オシリス, Oshirisu)
Voiced by: Rui Asano
A living gargoyle like Gar-kun. Unable to speak due to having no vocal cords so relies on speech synthesis or writing to communicate.
Hamilton (ハミルトン, Hamiruton)
Voiced by: Hiroshi Yanaka
Scottish alchemist who experimented on his daughter Lili.

== Media ==
=== Light novel ===
Yoshinaga-san Chi no Gargoyle is a Japanese light novel series written by Sennendō Taguchi and illustrated by Yuji Himukai. The main story consists of 15 volumes published between January 2004 and July 2008 by Famitsu Bunko.

==== Gargoyle Alternative ====
A spin-off series titled Gargoyle Alternative (ガーゴイルおるたなてぃぶ) was published from July 2006 to January 2009, lasting 5 volumes.

==== Other ====
Short stories set in the Gargoyle universe have been published in various non-series books, including 3 collaborative short story anthologies.

=== Manga ===
The manga drawn by Kagari Tamaoka was serialized in the Magi-Cu ("Magical-Cute") magazine. The first tankōbon volume was released on March 31, 2006, while the second was published on February 25, 2008.

=== Anime ===
The anime was produced by Studio Hibari and began airing in April 2006, ending with a total of 13 episodes. Sentai Filmworks licensed the series in 2021. The opening theme, Ohayō! (オハヨウ) and main ending theme Ai nioide, Ai nioide (愛においで逢いにおいで) are performed by Chiwa Saito, Nana Mizuki, and Yuuna Inamura. Episode 13 has its own unique ending theme titled Kotae wa Sora no Shita (答えは空の下) which is sung by Chiwa Saito.

== Reception ==
The first light novel won the Fifth Enterbrain Entertainment Award. Panelist and novelist Tōru Akitsu described the work as "exuding warmth" and written with a "high degree of perfection." Novelist Usagi Nakamura added that the novel "had soul" and was "heartwarming."
