= Petopeto-san =

Manga

ぺとぺとさん
- Genre: Romantic comedy
- Light novel
- Written by: Kou Kimura
- Illustrated by: Yug
- Published by: Enterbrain
- Imprint: Famitsu Bunko
- Original run: February 20, 2004 – December 24, 2005
- Volumes: 5
- Anime television series
- Directed by: Akira Nishimori
- Produced by: Nobuhiro Osawa; Maki Horiuchi; Jin Kawamura; Yuki Mori; Yukinao Shimoji
- Written by: Megumu Sasano
- Music by: Masaki Kurihara
- Studio: Xebec M2
- Original network: Chiba TV, Kids Station, San Television, TV Saitama, TVK
- Original run: 9 July 2005 – 1 October 2005
- Episodes: 13

Petopeto-san (ぺとぺとさん) is a light novel series written by Kou Kimura, with illustrations by Yug. A television anime adaptation ran from July 9, 2005, to October 1, 2005. The show takes place in a Japanese school where everything is normal, except for students from what are called "specified races." The specified races are based on yōkai from Japanese mythology; for example, one student on the swim team is a kappa, while another, a nurikabe, merges with walls and is popular in the summertime for having a very cool temperature.

== Characters ==
=== Main characters ===
==== Shingo Oohashi ====
Shingo is a human. He is a good cook, and is not racist against different races. He cares for Petoko a lot, and does not want her to disappear, so he helps her a lot.

==== Hatoko "Petoko" Fujimura ====
PetoPeto race. Her main source of food is love. With lack of love or food she becomes transparent, which would eventually cause her to disappear. She fears that her race will eventually become extinct. Her mom had three girls before her and all were born insubstantial and faded out soon after birth. Her mom constantly presses her to have a child so she will no longer be in danger of fading out too. She is constantly ashamed of sticking to people, claiming that is how her race traps men into being their husbands.

=== Secondary characters ===
==== Kuguru Sahara ====
She is half-Kappa race. She is a good swimmer, and faster than humans. She likes Shingo.

==== Chochomaru Sahara ====
Kappa race. she is Kuguru's sister, who wanted to kill her sister because she believes the family only needs one heir. She and her sister later went back to good terms.

==== Chie Oohashi ====
Human. Shingo's little sister. She seems to hate the special races, or for her they are monsters.

== Episode list ==
- Hello-san (Originally aired July 9, 2005)
- A Special Race (Originally aired July 16, 2005)
- Mint or Lavender (Originally aired July 23, 2005)
- Family Matters (Originally aired July 30, 2005)
- Younger Sister Village (Originally aired August 6, 2005)
- Older Sister and Younger Sister (Originally aired August 13, 2005)
- Ding-ling Ding-ling (Originally aired August 20, 2005)
- Summer Camp (Originally aired August 27, 2005)
- Police Chief for a Day (Originally aired September 3, 2005)
- Scout (Originally aired September 10, 2005)
- "Imo-ten" Test Trial Version (Originally aired September 17, 2005)
- Project Daybreak (Originally aired September 24, 2005)
- Good-bye, Petopeto-san (Originally aired October 1, 2005)

== Sources and external links ==
- Petopeto-san (anime) at Anime News Network's encyclopedia
- Archive of Official website (in Japanese)
