= Gakkō no Kaidan (novel series) =

Japanese light novel series

- Gakkō no Kaidan light novel volume 1

学校の階段 (The School's Staircase)
- Genre: Comedy, School life
- Light novel
- Written by: Takaaki Kaima
- Illustrated by: Amane Amahuku
- Published by: Enterbrain
- Imprint: Famitsu Bunko
- Original run: January 30, 2006 – October 30, 2010
- Volumes: 12
- Live-action film
- Directed by: Hirohisa Sasaki
- Studio: Kadokawa Pictures
- Released: April 28, 2007
- Runtime: 75 minutes
- Manga
- Written by: Takaaki Kaima
- Illustrated by: Aki Yoshii
- Published by: Enterbrain
- Imprint: Famitsu Clear Comics
- Magazine: Famitsu Comic Clear
- Original run: March 2010 – March 2012
- Volumes: 4
- Light novel

Gakkō no Soto-Kaidan
- Written by: Takaaki Kaima
- Illustrated by: Amane Amahuku
- Published by: Enterbrain
- Imprint: Famitsu Bunko
- Original run: March 30, 2012 – present
- Volumes: 2

Gakkō no Kaidan (学校の階段; lit. The School's Staircase) is a Japanese light novel series by Takaaki Kaima with illustrations by Amane Amahuku. The first novel in the series was released on January 30, 2006, and a total of twelve volumes have been published by Enterbrain under their Famitsu Bunko publishing imprint when the series concluded on July 30, 2009. A live action movie adaptation was directed by Hirosaka Sasaki and premiered in Japanese theaters on June 9, 2007. The word kaidan used in the title is homophonic to the word kaidan (怪談), meaning "ghost stories".

== Plot ==
=== Story ===
Gakkō no Kaidan's story takes place in the Tengurihama Academy, and centers around the male protagonist Yukihiro Kanba who has recently been admitted into the school after being adopted by his uncle. One day, Yukihiro stumbles across Yūko Kokonoe, who sprinted from the stairs behind him before quickly disappearing down the stairs. After Yukihiro stumbles across the gymnastic club, who attempts to recruit Yukihiro before being stopped by Yūko, he is forced to join the "staircase club", an unauthorized club that races in the stairs. While he is initially reluctant to join the club due to its bad reputation among students, he later finds the activities exhilarating and decides to join the club.

=== Characters ===
Yukihiro Kanba (神庭 幸宏, Kanba Yukihiro)
Yukihiro is the main protagonist of Gakkō no Kaidan. He is a first year student attending the private high school Tengurihama Academy. He lives with his cousins as both of his parents have died, and his uncle is always away on a business trip. Yukihiro is a natural airhead but at the same time has a mysteriously sharp intuition, which helps in various occasions. He does fine in all of the club's activities, albeit getting average times. He is nicknamed by Yūko as Button (缶バッチ, Kan bacchi), a pun on his surname.
Yūko Kokonoe (九重 ゆうこ, Kokonoe Yūko)
Yūko is the female main character of Gakkō no Kaidan. She is a third year student at Yukihiro's school, and is the chairman of the staircase club. Yūko has a cheerful and energetic personality, and originally represented the school's track and field team in hurdle events, but later quits and founded the staircase club after being introduced to the activity by Kengo. Despite her short stature, she has a high velocity when sprinting, leading to her nickname "Silent Bullet" (静かなる弾丸, Shizukanaru Dangan).
Kengo Kariya (刈谷 健吾, Kariya Kengo)
Kengo is a third year student and is Yūko's childhood friend. He has a rather cynical and self-sufficient personality, and is originally a student council executive, but later quits to establish the staircase club with Yūko. He is the strongest among the club members, and is familiar with even the smallest details of the staircases. He maintains an advantageous habit of making a turn in one step when reaching staircase turns, leading to his nickname "The Decisive V-Turn" (必殺Vターン, Hissatsu V-tān).
Izumi Amagasaki (天ヶ崎 泉, Amagasaki Izumi)
Izumi is a second year student at Yukihiro's school. She is a well-mannered and intelligent girl that is also known to make risky moves such as leaping from the top of staircases, leading to her nickname Black-winged Angel (黒翼の天使, Kuro Tsubasa no Tenshi). She comes from a wealthy family, but prefers to be referred to by her given name as opposed to her family name. She has a tall stature and sports long, dark hair; she is nicknamed by other students as "The Goddess of Thunder" (雷の女神様, Ikazuchi no Megami-sama).
Sōji Saegusa (三枝 宗司, Saegusa Sōji)
Sōji is a second year student at Yukihiro's school. He is an intelligent and skilled computer user, and is rarely seen without his laptop computer, which he uses to track the club members' position in a race. He is able to calculate an advantageous course whenever running in a rally race, and is nicknamed "The Genius Line Maker" (天才ラインメーカー, Tensai Rain Mēkā).
Ken Izutsu (井筒 研, Izutsu Ken)
Ken is a first year student but is in a different class than Yukihiro. He has a hot-headed and rather impolite personality, and views Yukihiro as a rival. He actually has a crush on Yūko, the only reason that he joined the club. He constantly complains that he doesn't have a nickname, and is later nicknamed by Yūko as "Moonlight Dancing Step" (月光ダンシングステップ, Gekkō Danshingu Suteppu).
Mifuyu Kanba (神庭 美冬, Kanba Mifuyu)
Mifuyu is the youngest of Yukihiro's cousins and is a second year student. She is very quiet and has trouble expressing her feelings, especially to Yukihiro, but is in contrast really kind and caring. She is in the school's tennis club, and is nicknamed by students as "The Goddess of Blizzard" (氷の女神様, Kōri no Megami-sama).
Chizuru Nakamura (中村 ちづる, Nakamura Chizuru)
Chizuru is a third year student and is the current student council head executive. She dislikes the staircase club, claiming its activities a waste of time. She has a crush on Kengo though she denies it, and blames Yūko for his departure from the student council.
Konatsu Kanba (神庭 小夏, Kanba Konatsu)
Konatsu is the second oldest of Yukihiro's cousins. She is a substitute teacher at Yukihiro's school and is the adviser for the staircase club. Despite her reputation among students as a kind teacher, she was once a delinquent known as "The Yashahime of Kikyōin" (桔梗院の夜叉姫, Kikyōin no Yashahime) when she was attending Kikyōin Academy.

== Media ==
=== Light novels ===
Gakkō no Kaidan began as a series of light novels written by Takaaki Kaima and illustrated by Amane Amahuku. Kaima originally entered the first novel in the series into Enterbrain's eighth Enterbrain Entertainment Awards in 2005, and the novel tied with Satoshi Katō's Hashitte Kaero! for the excellence award. Ten volumes and two short story collections from the original series were released between January 30, 2006 and October 30, 2010, under Enterbrain's Famitsu Bunko label. In Kadokawa Shoten's first Light Novel Award contest held in 2007, the first volume of Gakkō no Kaidan was one of three runner-ups in the school setting category, having lost the award to Chrome Shelled Regios. A spin-off series, titled Gakkō no Soto-Kaidan (学校の外階段; lit. The School's Exterior Staircase) and again written and illustrated by Kaima and Amahuku, will begin to be published starting with its first volume on March 30, 2012.

=== Movie ===
A live action movie adaptation, based on the first volume of the novels, was directed by Hirohisa Sasaki and premiered in Japanese theaters on April 28, 2007. The movie featured several prominent changes from the light novels, such as instead of Yukihiro Kanba, the role of the protagonist was given to the female character Satomi Kanba played by Mei Kurukawa, whose role is based on Yukihiro's. Other cast members include Airi Tōriyama as Yūko Kokonoe, Toshinobu Matsuo as Kengo Kariya, Asami Kai as Izumi Amagasaki, Rakuto Tochihara as Sōji Saegusa, Nana Akiyama as Nami Izutsu, and Yuka Kosaka as Chizuru Nakamura.

Before the film was released, the opening theme, entitled "Start Line" (スタートライン, Sutāto Rain) by Mei Kurukawa, was released in a maxi single of the same name on April 25, 2007. The ending theme for the movie is "Because You Are You" (君は君だから, Kimi wa Kimi Dakara). A DVD release of the film was released on October 26, 2007.

=== Manga ===
A manga adaptation based on the original Gakkō no Kaidan light novel series was serialized between March 2010 and March 2012 on Enterbrain's online manga magazine Famitsu Comic Clear. The manga was illustrated by Aki Yoshii based on the original character designs by Amane Amahuku, and the series' twenty-four individual chapters were later collected into a series of four tankōbon volumes published under Enterbrain's Famitsu Clear Comics imprint between September 15, 2010, and March 15, 2012.
