= Magician's Academy =

Japanese light novel series

- Cover art for the first light novel

まじしゃんず・あかでみい (Majishanzu Akademii)
- Genre: Fantasy, harem, romantic comedy
- Light novel
- Written by: Ichirō Sakaki
- Illustrated by: Blade
- Published by: Enterbrain
- Imprint: Famitsu Bunko
- Original run: January 24, 2003 – August 30, 2007
- Volumes: 9 + 7 short story volumes
- Manga
- Written by: Ichirō Sakaki
- Illustrated by: Blade
- Published by: Enterbrain
- Magazine: Magi-Cu
- Published: March 25, 2006
- Volumes: 1
- Video game
- Developer: Enterbrain
- Publisher: Enterbrain
- Genre: Moe Simulation RPG
- Platform: PlayStation 2
- Released: June 7, 2007
- Manga
- Written by: Ichirō Sakaki
- Illustrated by: Hitomi Nakao
- Published by: Media Factory
- Magazine: Monthly Comic Alive
- Original run: February 27, 2008 – November 27, 2009
- Volumes: 3
- Anime television series
- Directed by: Takaomi Kanasaki
- Produced by: Tomoko Kawasaki; Toshiaki Asaka; Kenta Suzuki; Michiyoshi Koyama; Yōhei Maeda
- Written by: Katsumi Hasegawa
- Music by: Tomoki Hasegawa
- Studio: Zexcs
- Original network: Chiba TV, TV Kanagawa, Tokyo MX, Sun TV
- Original run: October 5, 2008 – December 21, 2008
- Episodes: 12

Magician's Academy (まじしゃんず・あかでみい, Majishanzu Akademii), also known as Macademi Wasshoi!, is a Japanese light novel series by Ichirō Sakaki, with illustrations by Blade. Nine volumes were published between January 24, 2003, and August 30, 2007; there is also a series of seven illustrated short stories called Macademi Radical. A manga adaptation by Blade was serialized in Enterbrain's Magi-Cu magazine in 2006. Another manga adaptation by Hitomi Nakao was serialized in Media Factory's Monthly Comic Alive magazine between February 27, 2008, and November 27, 2009, and collected in three volumes. An anime television series adaptation animated by Zexcs aired between October and December 2008.

== Plot ==
Magician's Academy revolves around Takuto Hasegawa, who attends a magic academy that is not marked on any map. During a summoning spell exam, he accidentally creates a girl named Tanarotte, who happens to hold enough magical power to destroy his country, but fortunately Tanarotte professes undying loyalty to her "creator."

The universe separated in three worlds: Heaven, Human World (Earth), and the Demon realm. The Gods and Demons are not seen fighting among themselves in the human world and try to keep their existence a secret from them. The human world is only source of entertainment and enlightenment to both the demons and the gods to the point of smuggling human goods to both realms.

== Characters ==
=== Main characters ===
Takuto Hasegawa (羽瀬川 拓人, Hasegawa Takuto)
Voiced by: Ami Koshimizu (anime)
The main male lead, he is described as being "extremely normal in all fields" and attends school in both the normal world and the magic world. During an incident on his retake summoning test, he accidentally summoned Tanarotte. Most of the predicaments he is in are caused by the antics of Tanarotte or by him being summoned by Sakuma for some mission (given the nickname Harem, which Takuto dislikes). He is normally the voice of reason and finds ways to get the answer without the use of violence. At the end of Episode 8 of the anime, Gabuyan and Agarin refer to Takuto as the 'Holy Mother', a being with the power to create Gods and Demons. Fablom has told Sagami that Takuto must be killed out of fear of him causing an upset of power between the Gods and Demons. Agarin and Byakarin spoke on his behalf though as his true powers haven't awakened yet. In a fit of anger, caused by Takuto witnessing his friends being hurt, Takuto's powers awoke and he began to summon at least five monstrous beings (each emitting the cries of a newborn) before he was subdued by Gabriel and Agaliarept. It is suggested that Takuto is in fact immensely powerful as the pair suffer burns along their arms, and also join in on a plot to erase him from existence out of fear. Takuto may or may not recall this incident. Tanarotte rescues him from being erased from existence. It is revealed that Tanarotte is part of Takuto's soul.
Suzuho Hasegawa (羽瀬川 鈴穂, Hasegawa Suzuho)
Voiced by: Ui Miyazaki (anime)
She is Takuto's cousin and is so shy that she is mute, communicating to others by writing on a sketch pad and hiding in various objects, most commonly a doll helmet whose eyes also move on their own. Like her cousin, she is a magic user, and she has the rare ability to suck the powers of any magic user around her when she unbraids her hair, turning a distinctive blue color which led her terrified classmates to nickname her "Midnight Blue Vampire." In this form, she speaks rudely and has no strength other than that of a normal teenage girl, leading her to use a mechanical sword called 'Walpurgis', which with no magical properties isn't affected by her powers. It has been confirmed that she is another personality of Suzuho, she referred to Takuto as "ours", and her blue haired personality was referred to as the other Suzuho. She clearly has affection for Takuto, blushing at his compliments and nearly destroying Magic Academy to get him back; because of this she moved in with Takuto now that he lives with Tanarotte to keep an eye on her. However anytime a character points that affection out, she gets extremely nervous. In episode 4 she becomes a student in the same school as Takuto where she is popular among the other female students because of the high-class high school she used to go to before this school. In episode 11, where Takuto is placed in alternated world. A world being made where Takuto wasn't a magician, Suzuho's copy suggested that the two have sex, as she will soon die, however Takuto refuses. The copy claims that her imminent death is due to the fact that one body cannot support two souls, in addition to her having suffered the injuries she took before Takuto awoke. Unlike in the "real world", her copy is able to talk.
Tanarotte (タナロット)
Voiced by: Mariya Ise (anime)
Described as being "Unknown", Tanarotte is a young, well-endowed, familiar who was summoned by Takuto. Whether she is a god or a demon is unknown. Her magical power is over 100,000, divinity power 5,000, offensive power 5,000 and defensive power 78,000 and is physically strong as well, able to hold off a small army of Golem units with only a single hand. When first summoned she was running on pure animal-like instincts and tended to act like an affectionate cat around Takuto (only saying Myu, clinging to him while being completely naked, and licking his cheek). It wasn't till Takuto had named her (as she reminded him of a cat he once had named Tanarotte) that she calmed down and was able to talk. She is shown to have a genuine affection towards Takuto and treats her Familiar service to him as if they were a newly married couple, but her personality resembles that of an energetic child. It is later revealed that Tanarotte has the power to 'evolve' into either a god or a demon. Both the gods and demons are concerned by this as it could shift the already delicate balance between light and darkness to one side. A running gag is every time she is in a risqué scene, she is replaced with a claymation version for the TV version, while in the DVD version they are fully animated. In episode 4 she becomes a student in the same school as Takuto going by the name Tanarotte Unthirteen.
Falcé the Variable Wand (ファルチェ・ザ・ヴァリアブルワンド)
Voiced by: Yukari Fukui (anime)
Also known as "Falcé the Variablewand". When Falcé is in her 'humanoid' form, she has the appearance of a tall, well endowed woman with a pair of spiraled horns on either side of her head. She has a very ditzy and naïve personality, calling herself the Demon King despite being female, but she is incredibly powerful (Magical power estimated to be around 58,000), able to use magic even when Suzuho is in her "Midnight Blue Vampire" form. She was the last and greatest masterpiece of a powerful dark magician and alchemist who died long ago, leaving her alone without even naming her. When Takuto stumbled across her chamber during a training session, Falcé took him captive. After fighting with Tanarotte and Suzuho, she was defeated. Later she returned, having accepted Takuto as her new master. In episode 4 she uses her powers to transform into many class related objects (mechanical pencil, etc), though she transforms to her original form as a staff for Takuto, and also Tanarotte describes her as being Takuto's Dutch wife. Though she has genuine affection for Takuto, unlike Suzuho and Tanarotte she doesn't force her feelings onto him but rather comforts him from their antics, however she does go along with their ideas from time-to-time.

=== Normal School ===
Futaba Kirishima (霧島 双葉, Kirishima Futaba)
Voiced by: Rina Satou (anime)
Described as being "bright, active, and courageous yet also girly". She attends the normal school along with Takuto and is completely unaware of his magical powers. She has a strong crush on Takuto, but hides this fact. She is very surprised when she discovers that Tanarotte and Suzuho are living with Takuto. Matters become more complicated when she meets Falce at Takuto's apartment in a naked apron outfit.
Hazuki Kirishima (霧島 葉月, Kirishima Hazuki)
Voiced by: Yuuichi Ishigami (anime)
It is said that "his face is Yakuza." He is the twin of his sister Futaba and knows about her crush on Takuto. He always figures out ways to hint at his sister's attraction to Takuto, even though doing so causes Futaba to hit him hard (to the point his body impression is left on a stone wall). Then again, she seems to hit him after he speaks about anything.

=== Magician's Academy ===
Faculty

Izumo

A gatekeeper between the Human and the Magic world that is a large stone face on the door. He allows the students into the school and many other locations as well. He has also appeared as a shield for Takuto and grown to a large size that he could transport the entire school of Magician's Academy.

Principal

Only mentioned in episode 11 but is never seen. The Santa in episode 12 is called "principal" by Sakura Eitarou and may also be Takuto's father. It is implied that, like Sakuma, the principal has a hidden nature.

Professor Fablom

A professor that is always seen chained and hanging upside-down. It is his school uniform design that the students are currently wearing, winning the MaU-con 3 years in a row. It is never truly explained what position he has in Magician's Academy but it is suggested it might be right below the Principal.

Eitarou Sakuma (佐久間 榮太郎, Sakuma Eitarou)

Voiced by: Takuma Terashima (anime)
Described as being a "part-time teacher [at the school] and also very skilled magician." He is an easy-going teacher and helps out Takuto and Suzuho. He is clearly a powerful magician, as shown when he easily broke the barrier which Miyabi and Sinclavier erected and even overpowered them. He is also highly knowledgeable on the use of magic, as demonstrated by his ability to summon a black demon lord to do his bidding. However, his personality and behavior are rather perverted, and he is an unabashed otaku, who often joins in with Professor Frankenstein perverted schemes. He appears to favor the paws of animal girls, to the point that he made battle gloves for Tanarotte in the shape of cat's paws, and maid outfits, which is why he dressed up Eineus, Miyabi, and Sinclavier as maids. Eineus has stated that he spends more time on his assorted hobbies than on his actual work. There is some indication that he is other than human and is, in fact, Samael, the Angel of Death; when confronting Gabriel and Agaliarept and his identity demanded, he responds simply with his name ("SAkuMA EitaROU" with emphasis, "SAMAEROU" with the L-as-R of Japanese). After a moment of repetition, Agaliarept says "You couldn't be...!" and Gabriel chimes in with "Samae..." Sakuma goes on to prove capable of defeating the both of them, and seems dismissive of the possibility that beings of their level could do anything to truly harm him, stating "if you want to kill me, get Lucifer to do it".
Eineus the Vergest (エーネウス・ザ・バージェスト)
Voiced by: Ayako Kawasumi (anime)
Eineus is Eitarou's familiar, described as being "a relatively ethical character in the show." She is actually a type of demonic beast, called Vergest, and she is known to be the strongest among them all. Eitarou has her dressed up as a dog-girl maid; she is very devoted to him, but will not hesitate to harm him if he strays off because of his perverted ways, and frequently lectures him. She is a very capable fighter, able to fight on-par with Tanarotte, with the ability to make copies of herself. She wields a weapon which is a combination of spear and broom in combat. It is hinted that she might have feelings for Takuto, as she was annoyed that he referred to her as a "mother figure", and has a picture of when they went out on their "date" stickered to her weapon.
Sakuma has made a bunch of miniature versions of her. All of them function properly, except for one, which is comically seen tripping and needing the help of the others. Sakuma has also made a giant robot version. He is proud of how closely his design mimics the original, stating they wear the same type of underwear and have the same placement of birthmarks. His pride has led Eineus to punish him repeatedly before he can describe where her birthmarks are located.

Professor Sagami (寒河江教授, Sagami Kyouju)

Voiced by: Omi Minami (anime)
Described as being "Professor and also adviser of the discipline committee [who] uses his "Golem" Droid Army," he is child-sized and has the unique ability to separate his head from his body, which he uses to instruct his class while his body writes on the board. This ability has shown to be a problem, however, as they tend to separate from any attack. It is suggested that he is a possessed doll, inhabited by a tentacle-eyed demon who uses magic to control both his body and his head separately. When Suzuho takes off her ribbon, he equips an oversized AAA battery on his back to power his body.
Trincia (トリンシア)
Voiced by: Akiko Kimura (anime)
Described as being "Virtual God in a PC. She works as a coach, guide and examiner for students." She appears to be a little girl in the computer system that helps students with their exams. Takuto usually calls her Trin or Torin.
Professor Frankram Stein (フランクラム・シュタイン教授)
Voiced by: Nobuyuki Hiyama (anime)
A professor, he is perverted like Sakuma but more vocal about it, even describing why girls dressed in animal cosplay are the best as one of his class lectures. To fulfill his perverted fantasies, he invented a machine called Mimigar Z uses magic to change the students of Magician's Academy into part animal and gives out animal ear headbands to his students. He reinvented the machine to the point that it doesn't rely on magic, which he called Mimigar ZZ. He appears to prefer the ears of animal girls to the point when he is upset, the only thing that can calm him down is if the student wears an animal ear headband. His current invention is Mimigar ZZZ, which is an animal ear headband that forces the user to act tsundere (this most likely a reference to the anime Mazinger Z's Sayaka Yumi, known for being one of the earliest anime characters with a tsundere personality.

Hapxier

Voiced by: Nobuo Tobita (anime)
A mid class level 3 angel who is a masochist, pansexual, and a former teacher of the magical academy. From his appearance, he is muscular man, wearing a black/purple S&M, purple lipstick, & has halo over his head in the shape of a fused male and female sign (symbolizing that he is pansexual ), and he has 3 sets of small angel wings along his back. 20 years prior the start of the story, he was a tyrant who would give a horrible French kiss to his students, whom he adores. To evade his horrible love, his students sealed him away. Later, his seal was broken when Metalys accidentally punched George. His policy is Love and Peace. He is so annoying to everyone, not even the Gods or Demons want him back. He now works as the school's janitor after being fired due to his 20 year absence that was later revealed to be voluntary because of his masochism. He now replaces Falce's embrace scene in the opening credits. He still sexually harasses the students, but becomes a source of support and guidance to student George in the last episode. Although their apparent closeness (George voluntarily hugs Hapxier when George himself is emotionally distraught) is shocking to all who perceive it, it seems that Hapxier does provide George with genuine comfort. Whenever Hapxier dramatically appears, a rendition of the theme song of the 1980 Flash Gordon movie is played.

Dwarfs

They are employed to repair the damages to the Academy, but they can be used to fix stuff in the human world as Takuto called them to fix the hole Suzuho blasted through his apartment and completely fix a city.

Students

Metalys (メタリス)
Voiced by: Akeno Watanabe (anime)
A robotic student that is powered by magic. Because of this he is heavily affected to Suzuho's magic stealing ability. He is initially hinted to be homosexual and attracted to his friend George. However, it turns out that he is actually in love with the Midnight Blue Vampire, Suzuho's other personality, and only wanted to talk to George about his feelings. Metalys's feelings for the Midnight Blue Vampire prove to be so strong that he is willing to risk his own life to save hers. Though he discovers she has feelings for Takuto, he keeps trying to impress her though he needs to run off a separate battery system to be able to chat with her. The two seem to have at least hit up an unusual friendship, though Metalys craves more.
George (ジョージ)
Voiced by: Mitsuhiro Sakamaki (anime)

A student that is commonly seen with Metalys, yet over time he seems to be growing increasingly creeped out by Metalys' unusual attraction towards him. However, when he thinks Metalys is about to confess to him he starts to respond positively, only to find out Metalys was speaking to Suzuho, and he becomes deeply distraught. Later, George repeatedly tries to win Metalys back (although he never actually had him), even conspiring to kill Suzuho, but fails (comically getting injured by Metalys, who was too excited to notice him as he was trying to impress Midnight Blue Vampire). In the end, George becomes so distraught that he seeks refuge in prayer – and attracts the attention of Hapxier, who seems to become a mentor figure, as well as a source of support to him. At the very end, George has even begun dressing like Hapxier, and addresses him as 'my lord'.

Mikariya Haruka
Voiced by: Kei Shindou (anime)

The 1st apprentice of professor Sagami. She builds heavily armed battle golems and gives long monologues before attacking with them. Her golems have German names, such as Kreis Kreuz Drei. She is rather manic and dreams of surpassing her master, but also adores him.

=== Other ===
Synclavier the Siren (シンクラヴィア・ザ・セイレーン) Voiced by: Yu Kobayashi and Miyabi, The West of the Four Gods – Byakko (ミヤビ) Voiced by: Hitomi Nabatame
A Demon and a God that went on a secret mission to find and destroy Tanarotte to keep the balance of Gods and Demons in check, since if Tanarotte awakens as a member of either group, it will tip the scale that has existed since the beginning of existence, under orders from Gabriel and Agaliarept. Miyabi is The West of the Four Gods, Byakko, with long silver hair dressed in a miko outfit with the special ability to heal others through kissing, whereas Synclavier is a Demon with short red hair and a very revealing leather outfit with chains. Miyabi infrequently sports the ears and tail of the white tiger she is associated with through her 'Byakko' title. As in the anime Shuffle! the only physical differences between the two species compared to that of a normal human appears to be their ears: the Demons have long pointed ears and Gods have short pointed ears. Because Miyabi and Synclavier undertook their mission in secret, after their capture neither the Gods or the Demons took credit for sending them and are suggesting they acted on their own. As punishment, they have been enslaved by Sakuma Eitaro, who has among other things forced them to dress up as maids, and also to help him draw a manga – both as models and as his assistants in drawing and coloring, a chore they loathe with a passion. Their combat capabilities are bound by Sakuma Eitarou's seal – a constraint magic, which leaves them with no choice but to oblige to his orders. Their magical power levels are both around 60,000.

Next-Door Neighbor

He is Takuto's, Suzuho's, Tanarott's and Falce's next door neighbor who has been identified by other inhabitants of the apartment building as 'Omuro-san's husband'; he has a young daughter who lives in the same apartment as he, and presumably his wife. His own name is never mentioned. His most noticeable feature is his large, carp-like lips. He appears to be a bit of a pervert as he enjoys listening to the suggestive antics of his neighbors. In episode 12 of the anime, it is revealed the constant mind-wipes from the dwarfs repairing the apartment have damaged his cognitive functions in a seemingly irreversible way.

Gabriel (Gab-yan) Voiced by: Miyu Matsuki and Agaliarept (Aga-rin) Voiced by: Junichi Suwabe

In the continuity of Macademi Wasshoi, Gabriel is a high class angel in the form of a little girl, dressed up in gothic outfits and listening to music. Agaliarept is a high class demon who is an otaku and a moe expert, who keeps a huge collection of bishōjo games and anime in his lair, and doesn't want anyone to disturb him when he's watching or playing them. He is the First President of the Underworld Dark Moe Anime League. He has a masochistic maid, named Fermi, who is loyal to him and enjoys being punished by her master's lightning bolts. Both came to Magician's Academy to observe Tanarotte after their agents Miyabi and Synclavier failed to seal her, and in order to keep the "Holy Mother" in check. They are mostly seen enjoying themselves in the human world, and have not redeemed Miyabi and Synclavier. Despite the difference in race, they actually get along quite well, enjoying activities such as shopping together, watching the MaU-con in Magician's Academy, going to the hot springs in Eitaro's villa, and even call each other by nicknames: Gabu-yan and Aga-rin.

Fermi Voiced by: Akeno Watanabe

She is a masochistic maid or servant of Agaliarept, who loves to receive his punishment. She is loyal to him and was greatly concerned when she found out his huge collection of gal games (all with his name on the package – as the president of the underworld anime league). She does not appear to be hugely intelligent.

Baltia Voiced by: Ayahi Takagaki

She is a demon who is known as a fanatical bishōjo figure collector and a smuggler of goods (most are bishōjo figures) from the human world to the demon realm. She respects Sakuma Eitaro after their encounter and wouldn't go against him despite being bribed to do so by Miyabi and Synclavier, and even sold them out to Sakuma. In episode 12 she is running a shop selling anime goods. She is only seen wearing a black or dark purple cloak and in her first appearance it is suggested that she doesn't have anything else.
