= Mizuki Nomura =

- Born: Fukushima
- Occupation: Novelist
- Known for: Book Girl

Mizuki Nomura (野村美月, Nomura Mizuki) is a Japanese light novelist. Table Tennis was the best prize winner in the third Entame Prize (えんため大賞) in the novel category held by Enterbrain in 2003.

== Works ==
- Table Tennis series (卓球場シリーズ, Takkyū-ba shirīzu)
- Angel's Base Ball (天使のベースボール, Tenshi no bēsubōru)
- Bad! Daddy
- Rabbit Love (うさ恋。, Usa koi)
- Book Girl ("文学少女"シリーズ, Bungaku shōjo)
- When Hikaru was on the Earth ("ヒカルが地球にいたころ" シリーズ, Hikaru ga chikyū ni ita koro)
- Dress na Boku ga Yangotonaki Katagata no Kateikyōshi-sama na Kudan (ドレスな僕がやんごとなき方々の家庭教師様な件)
- Kyūketsuki ni Natta Kimi ha Eien no Ai o Hajimeru (吸血鬼になったキミは永遠の愛をはじめる)
- Manuscript Screening Boy and Manuscript Submitting Girl
