= The Seven Deadly Sins: Grudge of Edinburgh =

Two-part film by Bob Shirahata

- Release poster for Part 1
- Japanese: 七つの大罪 怨嗟のエジンバラ
- Revised Hepburn: Nanatsu no Taizai Ensa no Ejinbara
- Directed by: Noriyuki Abe (Note: Credited as Chief Director (総監督, Sō Kantoku)); Bob Shirahata
- Screenplay by: Rintarō Ikeda
- Story by: Nakaba Suzuki
- Based on: The Seven Deadly Sins by Nakaba Suzuki
- Starring: see below
- Cinematography: Hyunho Yoon
- Edited by: Megumi Uchida
- Music by: Kohta Yamamoto; Hiroyuki Sawano
- Production companies: Alfred Imageworks; Marvy Jack
- Distributed by: Netflix
- Release dates: December 20, 2022 (Part 1); August 8, 2023 (Part 2)
- Running time: 52 minutes (Part 1); 54 minutes (Part 2)
- Country: Japan
- Language: Japanese

The Seven Deadly Sins: Grudge of Edinburgh (Japanese: 七つの大罪 怨嗟のエジンバラ, Hepburn: Nanatsu no Taizai Ensa no Ejinbara) is a Japanese two-part animated fantasy action film directed by Bob Shirahata, with Noriyuki Abe as chief director and written by Rintarō Ikeda; the two-part film is based on The Seven Deadly Sins manga series by Nakaba Suzuki. Co-produced by Alfred Imageworks and Marvy Jack and distributed by Netflix, Grudge of Edinburgh is the third and fourth film for the series, following Prisoners of the Sky (2018) and Cursed by Light (2021), and takes place between the final episode of the anime series and its sequel series Four Knights of the Apocalypse. The first film was streamed on December 20, 2022, and the second film on August 8, 2023.

== Synopsis ==
=== Part 1 ===
Following their coronation as king and queen of Liones, the demon Meliodas and goddess Elizabeth have a son named Tristan, (Note: As depicted in The Seven Deadly Sins: Dragon's Judgement) who inherits both respective abilities of his parents. During a sparring match with his friend Lancelot, the half-fairy son of Meliodas's comrade Ban, the ten-year-old Tristan is briefly overtaken by his demonic impulses and seriously injures Lancelot, who goes missing shortly afterward. Ashamed and afraid of losing control of himself again, Tristan seeks out less violent applications of his powers, which strains his relationship with his parents.

Four years later, Elizabeth is struck with a fatal illness due to a curse placed on her by Priest, a servant of the former Holy Knight Deathpierce, who seeks vengeance for the injustices he suffered from the Demon and Goddess Clans fourteen years earlier. (Note: As depicted in The Seven Deadly Sins: Revival of The Commandments and Imperial Wrath of the Gods) Trying in vain to heal Elizabeth with his goddess powers, Tristan senses Priest and rushes out of Liones to save Elizabeth. Meliodas's comrade Gowther places a tracker on Tristan and contacts Ban, Diane, and King, their companions from the disbanded Seven Deadly Sins. Meanwhile, Deathpierce begins capturing demons, giants, and fairies to combine them into monstrous chimeras with his mystical Chaos Staff, intending to conquer Liones with them.

Tristan encounters a fairy who has saved three non-human children from the Empties, Deathpierce's army of magical automatons. Despite the fairy's hostility towards Tristan, the two join forces and follow the children's captured parents to Deathpierce's domain of Edinburgh, where they fend off Deathpierce's army and rescue the parents. When Tristan is nearly killed while struggling to control his demon instincts, the fairy saves him and assumes a human-like form, revealing himself to be Lancelot.

=== Part 2 ===
Tristan confronts Lancelot for disappearing, but Lancelot remains bitter over their childhood accident. Faced with another wave of Empties, the two bypass them on an ice bridge conjured by a knight with a star-shaped visor, leading them into Deathpierce's castle. While Tristan and Lancelot battle Deathpierce and Priest, Diane throws Meliodas, Ban, and Gowther directly to Edinburgh, where they eliminate Deathpierce's army. After Tristan defeats Priest, Elizabeth fully recovers and arrives with Diane and King shortly afterward.

Tristan and Lancelot follow Deathpierce as he retreats into another dimension. Anguished over his unfulfilled revenge, Deathpierce is transformed by his Chaos Staff into a powerful abomination. Lancelot encourages Tristan to stop holding himself back, explaining his bitterness comes from Tristan's refusal to continue their sparring match. Now trusting Lancelot's ability to stop him, Tristan willingly unleashes his demonic instincts and defeats Deathpierce, who returns to human form. Lancelot then subdues the mindless Tristan and destroys the Chaos Staff, knowing that Deathpierce received it from Arthur Pendragon in support of his ambitions.

The staff's destruction returns Tristan, Lancelot, and Deathpierce to Edinburgh, where Tristan reunites and reconciles with his parents. Ban sees Lancelot leaving the castle alone and recognizes the ice bridge as the work of Jericho, Lancelot's missing caretaker. The others return to Liones while Lancelot walks off with Jericho following him in the distance.

== Voice cast ==
Character	Japanese voice cast	English voice cast
Tristan Liones	Ayumu Murase; Mikako Komatsu (young)	Jeannie Tirado
Lancelot	Koki Uchiyama	Aleks Le
Meliodas	Yuki Kaji	Bryce Papenbrook
Elizabeth Liones	Sora Amamiya	Erika Harlacher
Diane	Aoi Yūki	Erica Mendez
Ban	Tatsuhisa Suzuki	Benjamin Diskin
King	Jun Fukuyama	Max Mittelman
Gowther	Yuhei Takagi	Erik Scott Kimerer
Deathpierce	Yōhei Azakami	Ben Lepley
Priest	Kazuyuki Okitsu	Stephen Fu
Tyrone	Shinnosuke Tokudome	Casey Mongillo
Kulumil	Shino Shimoji	LilyPichu
Minika	Makoto Koichi	Ryan Bartley
Hendrickson	Yūya Uchida	Kaiji Tang
Elaine	Kotori Koiwai	Brianna Knickerbocker
Gandf	Satoshi Tsuruoka	Imari Williams
Recela	Yuna Mimura	Dani Chambers
Denzel Liones	Rintarō Nishi	Michael McConnohie
Nerobasta	Mamiko Noto	Julia McIlvaine
Mage	Arisa Sakuraba	Wendee Lee

== Production ==
In November 2021, it was announced that The Seven Deadly Sins manga series would receive a two-part anime film for Netflix in 2022, with Bob Shirahata directing the film at both Alfred Imageworks and Marvy Jack, with Rinatō Ikeda returning to provide the screenplay after writing Cursed by Light film. The two-part film uses computer generated animation instead of hand-drawn animation used for previous entries of the series. In March 2022, it was announced that key cast members would reprise their roles, along with Ayumu Murase and Mikako Komatsu being cast as teenage and young Tristan respectively. The theme song for the first film is titled "LEMONADE" by Hiroyuki Sawano and XAI.

== Release ==
The two-part film was released on the Netflix streaming site, with the first film on December 20, 2022, and the second film in August 2023.

== Reception ==
=== Critical reception ===
Rebecca Silverman of Anime News Network gave the first film a B− rating, and stated "It's nice to reconnect with the characters and to see what their kids are up to, and overall, this feels like the start of a pretty good adventure." Kenneth Seward Jr. of IGN also thought the first film was entertaining, yet felt incomplete.
