= The Seven Deadly Sins the Movie: Prisoners of the Sky =

2018 film by Yasuto Nishikata

- Theatrical release poster
- Kanji: 劇場版 七つの大罪 天空の囚われ人
- Revised Hepburn: Gekijō-ban Nanatsu no Taizai Tenkū no Torawarebito
- Directed by: Noriyuki Abe (Note: Credited as Chief Director (総監督, Sō Kantoku)); Yasuto Nishikata
- Screenplay by: Makoto Uezu
- Story by: Nakaba Suzuki
- Based on: The Seven Deadly Sins by Nakaba Suzuki
- Starring: Yūki Kaji; Sora Amamiya; Misaki Kuno; Aoi Yūki; Tatsuhisa Suzuki; Jun Fukuyama; Yūhei Takagi; Maaya Sakamoto; Tomokazu Sugita
- Edited by: Masahiro Goto
- Music by: Hiroyuki Sawano; Takafumi Wada
- Production company: A-1 Pictures
- Distributed by: Toei Company
- Release date: August 18, 2018
- Running time: 99 minutes
- Country: Japan
- Language: Japanese
- Box office: $5,002,776

The Seven Deadly Sins the Movie: Prisoners of the Sky (Japanese: 劇場版 七つの大罪 天空の囚われ人, Hepburn: Gekijō-ban Nanatsu no Taizai Tenkū no Torawarebito) is a 2018 Japanese animated fantasy action film based on The Seven Deadly Sins manga series written and illustrated by Nakaba Suzuki. The film is directed by Yasuto Nishikata, with Noriyuki Abe as chief director, written by Makoto Uezu, and produced by A-1 Pictures. The film was released on August 18, 2018, in Japan and later released on November 29, 2018, in South Korea by MJ Pictures, and worldwide by Netflix on December 31, 2018.

A manga by the series' original author Nakaba Suzuki and a light novel of film adaptation by Shuka Matsuda was also released on August 18, 2018, in Japan.

The film marks the first film for the series, and was followed by Cursed by Light (2021), and Grudge of Edinburgh (2022-23).

== Plot ==
The story takes place in a time when humans and non-humans alike lived in the same society. The Kingdom of Liones was almost annihilated thanks to the evildoings of the Demon Clan, but were saved thanks to the efforts of the Kingdom's third Princess, Elizabeth, and a band of strong yet terrible knights known as The Seven Deadly Sins.

With peace returning to the Kingdom of Liones following its near annihilation by the Demon Race, Elizabeth and The Seven Deadly Sins decide to celebrate King Bartra's birthday with numerous dishes being prepared in the Boar Hat tavern. The Deadly Sins' leader Meliodas and his talking pig companion Hawk search for Skyfish for a recipe, ending up above the clouds and in front of the Sky Palace after stumbling across a well in the nearby forest which they discover is a portal. Living in the Sky Castle are a race of winged people known as the Celestials, descendants of the Goddess Race who hold watch over an Indura-type demon sealed in their land since the Ancient War's end 3,000 years ago. But when a group of demons calling themselves The Six Knights of Black attack the Celestials and release the Indura, forcing a Celestial youth named Solaad unintentionally bring Meliodas and Hawk to his people's land while he left to find the legendary white pig 'Oshiro' whose power was used to seal the evil. Solaad ends up meeting the other Deadly Sins, who mistook him for Meliodas due to their similar appearances, but manages to convince them to come with him while Meliodas went through a similar case of mistaken identity with the Celestials.

As The Seven Deadly Sins face the Six Knights of Black with support by the Celestials' warriors, it is revealed that the Knights of Black's leader Bellion is an upper-class demon who was denied membership into the Ten Commandments by Meliodas in the past. Meliodas ends up being mortally injured by the Winged Sword, a sacred sword forged specifically to harm demons. But Solaad, trusting The Seven Deadly Sins' insistence that Meliodas is a good person, removes the sword and revives Meliodas. Solaad then uses the Winged Sword and the combined power of his people, the Sins, and Elizabeth to destroy the Indura. The Sins are hailed as heroes and celebrate with the Celestials before taking a Skyfish and returning to Liones on Hawk's Mother, who is revealed to have been 'Oshiro' the entire time. Some time later, Batra is presented with the cooked Skyfish and is appalled by its horrible taste as Meliodas cooked it. Hawk decides to eat it for him and ends up assuming a Skyfish form to his shock.

== Voice cast ==
Character	Japanese voice actor	English dubbing actor
Meliodas	Yuki Kaji	Bryce Papenbrook
Elizabeth Liones	Sora Amamiya	Erika Harlacher
Hawk	Misaki Kuno	Cristina Vee
Diane	Aoi Yuki	Erica Mendez
Ban	Tatsuhisa Suzuki	Ben Diskin
King	Jun Fukuyama	Max Mittelman
Gowther	Yuhei Takagi	Erik Scott Kimerer
Merlin	Maya Sakamoto	Lauren Landa
Escanor	Tomokazu Sugita	Kyle Hebert
Solaad	Tsubasa Yonaga	Johnny Yong Bosch
Ellatte	Haruka Tomatsu	Cherami Leigh
Bellion	Toshiyuki Morikawa	Todd Haberkorn
Zoria	Akio Otsuka	Christopher Corey Smith
Vaness	Reiko Suzuki	Cindy Robinson
Atra	Takaya Kuroda	Jake Green
Bartra Liones	Rintaro Nishi	Joe Ochman
Dahaka	Toru Sakurai	Joe Ochman
Derocchio	Masuo Amada	Kyle Hebert
Hawk Mama	Kayo Nakajima	Lauren Landa
Gara	Yoko Hikasa	Reba Buhr
Pump	N/A	Tony Azzolino

== Production ==
It is directed by Yasuto Nishikata and written by Makoto Uezu, featuring an original story by Nakaba Suzuki and Noriyuki Abe serving as chief director. The other main staff members returned from the anime series to reprise their roles in the film. The movie features three original characters called Solaad, Ellatte, and Bellion. Solaad and Ellate's character designs are inspired by the original designs of Meliodas and Elizabeth in the manga's scrapped first chapter.

== Release ==
Prisoners of the Sky was released in theaters in Japan on August 18, 2018, and in South Korea on November 29, 2018. The release of DVD and blu-ray in Japan by A-1 Pictures is scheduled for February 27, 2019, as per official site. A dubbed version by Netflix was released worldwide on December 31, 2018.

== Reception ==
=== Critical reception ===
Kim Morrissy of Anime News Network rated "B−" for Prisoners of the Sky by praising for best action animation & choreography in the series, great use of comic relief characters, some clever uses of the series lore but criticized for lackluster story & side characters underdevelopment. Morrissy concluded, "All in all, The Seven Deadly Sins: Prisoners of the Sky is a serviceably popcorn film that delivers about as much as you'd reasonably expect from a shonen filler film."

=== Box office ===
On opening weekend, The Seven Deadly Sins the Movie: Prisoners of the Sky opened in Japan in 271 theaters and sold 169,000 tickets to rank #5 at Domestic Box Office with opening ¥196 million ($1.74 million). The anime film dropped from #5 to #10 in its second weekend the film earned 85,164,700 yen (about US$766,200) from Friday to Sunday, and earned a cumulative total of 427,180,300 yen (about US$3.84 million). Box Office Mojo stated that Anime Film overall grossed ¥432 million ($3.84 million) from second weekend. However, after ranking fifth in its first weekend and 10th in its second weekend, "The Seven Deadly Sins the Movie: Prisoners of the Sky" quickly dropped off from the top 10 in its third weekend. The film still earned 51,475,900 Yen (about US$463,800) from Friday to Sunday, and has earned a cumulative total of 549,019,700 Yen (about US$4.94 million) and completed its theatrical run at Domestic Market.

Outside of Japan, the anime film opened at #30 in South Korea on 29 November 2018 with opening around $3,376 and total box office earnings closed at $74,059 on 14 December 2018.
