= Nakaba Suzuki =

Japanese manga artist (born 1977)

- Born: February 8, 1977 (age 49); Sukagawa, Fukushima, Japan
- Occupation: Manga artist
- Years active: 1994–present
- Known for: Kongō Banchō; The Seven Deadly Sins; Four Knights of the Apocalypse
- Awards: Kodansha Manga Award (2015)

Nakaba Suzuki (Japanese: 鈴木央, Hepburn: Suzuki Nakaba; born February 8, 1977) is a Japanese manga artist. He is best known for his fantasy series The Seven Deadly Sins (2012–2020), which has over 55 million copies in circulation making it among the top 50 best-selling manga series of all time. He began a sequel, Four Knights of the Apocalypse, in 2021.

== Life and career ==
The first manga series Suzuki ever bought was Dr. Slump by Akira Toriyama. In elementary and junior high school, he was a fan of Kinnikuman, Fist of the North Star, and Dragon Ball. Suzuki moved from Fukushima Prefecture to Tokyo when he was a teenager. He made his professional debut in 1994 with the story "Revenge", which was an honorable mention for Shueisha's Hop Step Award. His first series, Rising Impact, was serialized in Shueisha's Weekly Shōnen Jump from 1998 to 2002. From 2007 to 2010, he serialized Kongō Banchō in Shogakukan's Weekly Shōnen Sunday.

Suzuki serialized The Seven Deadly Sins in Kodansha's Weekly Shōnen Magazine from 2012 to 2020. It won the 39th Kodansha Manga Award for Best Shōnen Manga alongside Yowamushi Pedal, and had over 55 million copies in circulation as of September 2023. The series has spawned a large media franchise including several spin-off manga, novels, an anime television series, and video games. Suzuki provided original stories to serve as the basis to four animated film adaptations, Prisoners of the Sky, Cursed by Light, and the two-part Grudge of Edinburgh.

Kodansha published The Seven Stories - Nakaba Suzuki Short Stories on October 17, 2014, which compiles seven short stories that the author originally published in various magazines between 2004 and 2014. In January 2021, Suzuki began Four Knights of the Apocalypse as a sequel to The Seven Deadly Sins.

== Style ==
Suzuki draws his manuscripts with pen and paper, stating that it does not feel like drawing manga without them. Although, in 2021, he noted that the tones and Copic markers that he uses are being discontinued one after another. The artist also refuses to use assistants due to his contrary personality. He has done this since he began his career, when an early editor told him he could not do it without one, and he wanted to prove him wrong. Suzuki said that drawing by himself allows him to take breaks to play games while working, and drink alcohol. Suzuki strongly prefers physical books and often visits bookstores, where he buys large books such as picture books and dictionaries to use as references. He even asked that the digital editions of the collected volumes of The Seven Deadly Sins be released one month after the print version.

== Works ==
- Rising Impact (ライジングインパクト) (1998–2002) (Weekly Shōnen Jump)
- Ultra Red (2002–2003) (Weekly Shōnen Jump)
- Boku to Kimi no Aida ni (僕と君の間に) (2004–2006) (Ultra Jump)
- Blizzard Axel (ブリザードアクセル) (2005–2007) (Weekly Shōnen Sunday)
- Kongō Banchō (金剛番長) (2007–2010) (Weekly Shōnen Sunday)
- Chiguhagu Lovers (ちぐはぐラバーズ) (2011–2012) (Weekly Shōnen Champion)
- The Seven Deadly Sins (七つの大罪) (2012–2020) (Weekly Shōnen Magazine)
- The Seven Stories - Nakaba Suzuki Short Stories (七つの短編 鈴木央短編集) (2014)
- Four Knights of the Apocalypse (黙示録の四騎士) (2021–present) (Weekly Shōnen Magazine)
