= Kenka Bancho: Badass Rumble =

2008 video game

- Official North American cover art
- Developer: Bullets
- Publishers: JP: Spike; NA: Atlus
- Platform: PlayStation Portable
- Release: AS: November 27, 2008; JP: November 27, 2008; NA: November 10, 2009
- Genre: Beat 'em up
- Mode: Single-player

Kenka Bancho: Badass Rumble, known in Japan as Kenka Banchō 3: National Conquest (喧嘩番長3 全国制覇, Kenka Banchō 3: Zenkoku Seiha), is a PlayStation Portable beat 'em up video game released in 2008 in Japan and Asia, and in 2009 in the United States. It follows the efforts of a Japanese "bancho" (delinquent leader) and his efforts to become Japan's top bancho by beating up all the other regional banchos during a field trip.

The title Badass Rumble was chosen by Atlus after letting users vote on a title for its North American release.

Since the release of Kenka Bancho: Badass Rumble, there have been five more entries in the series: Kenka Bancho 4: One Year War (Feb 25, 2010), Kenka Bancho 5: The Rule Of Men (Jan 27, 2011), Kenka Bancho Bros. Tokyo Battle Royale (June 21, 2012), and Kenka Bancho 6: Soul & Blood (Jan 15, 2015).

Atlus has not announced any plans to localize further games in the series.

== Plot ==
The game takes place on a school field trip to the fictional city of Kyouto. Focusing on Takashi Sakamoto, a bancho of the same school, unwillingly goes with his class as he is told that he will fail the school year if he does not attend. He meets up with his best friend and loyal ally, Yohei, and soon meets with other friends as well riding on the train. When they arrive to Kyouto Station, Yohei accidentally knocks into another bancho. After a swift fight between Takashi and the bancho, Takashi learns that all schools are visiting Kyouto for one week and there are 47 banchos in all fighting together in a contest seeing who is the "toughest guy in all of Japan". Takashi, now persuaded to stay with his class, takes on the challenge to be the toughest guy in Japan. Between fighting the 47 Banchos, he must also deal with the Shinsengumi of Ikeda who are the strongest shabazos of this town and none pleased with the arrival of so many Banchos threatening their town.

== Gameplay ==
The bancho attacking a group of shabazo.

The player begins by naming their bancho and school name as well as choosing a location in Japan as their hometown and each location grants a different starting special move. The player must then challenge rival banchos from other towns/schools and defeat them in order to become number one. The player can travel through the streets of Kyouto during the day, as this game is sandbox, or free roaming, and pick fights with "shabazo" (weaklings) by using the "Menchi Beam" to stare them down. After participating in a trash-talking quick time event, the player can then initiate battle, the player can also immediately initiate battle by attacking enemies off guard but this will have an effect on the player's Bancho rating. The game also uses an RPG system that allows the player to level up their bancho to learn new moves and make him stronger.

If the player wins a battle against another Bancho, the Bancho will become the player's peon (partner) and will assist in battle if called using the cellphone. The player has access to a large variety of outfits, moves and weapons which can be changed from the player's room in the inn. A variety of items can be obtained and used to restore the player's health, energy, and spirit as well as temporarily increase their stats. The amount of items the player can carry depends on the number of pockets the character has which is influenced by the character's clothing.

The player can travel to different districts either on foot or through various modes of transportation (for a small charge). Over the course of the game, the player can obtain itineraries that details the various Bancho leader's locations depending on the time of day which is needed in order to make finding rival banchos easier. These itineraries can be gained by defeating shabazos.

In normal mode, the game runs on a 7-day time limit, depending on the players actions, they can earn various endings, the game can then be replayed as a new game plus that carries over everything the player has earned except for their peons. There is also a more casual mode called "Night Out". This mode does not have a fixed time limit and allows the player to fight as many opponents as they like before quitting (a quick-play style of mode) however, players are limited to only a few districts, fewer sets of enemies and will not be able to call on peons for help nor be able to sleep to restore health and stamina. Players also will not be able level up in this mode, instead enemies will randomly drop glowing experience orbs known as Bancho Souls (in normal gameplay, leveling up will also allow the player to earn bancho souls) which will allow the player to strengthen their Bancho or sell for cash. Players will find themselves using this mode often as enemies gradually get stronger as the player levels up in normal gameplay not to mention to obtain the various item and money drops to help prepare. This mode can be played with a friend locally via ad hoc.

== Reception ==
Reception

Aggregate score
Aggregator	Score
Metacritic	70/100

Review scores
Publication	Score
1Up.com	B−
Destructoid	7.5/10
Famitsu	30/40
GamePro	4/5 stars
GameSpot	7/10
GameZone	7.5/10
IGN	6.8/10
PlayStation: The Official Magazine	3/5 stars

The game received "average" reviews according to the review aggregation website Metacritic. In Japan, Famitsu gave it a score of two eights and two sevens for a total of 30 out of 40, and also listed it as one of the magazine's Best PSP Games of 2008.

== See also ==
- Kenka Bancho Otome: Girl Beats Boys
