= Kongō Banchō =

Japanese manga series by Nakaba Suzuki

- First tankōbon volume cover, featuring Akira Kongō

金剛番長
- Genre: Action
- Manga
- Written by: Nakaba Suzuki
- Published by: Shogakukan
- Imprint: Shōnen Sunday Comics
- Magazine: Weekly Shōnen Sunday
- Original run: October 24, 2007 – March 10, 2010
- Volumes: 12
- icon

Kongō Banchō (金剛番長; lit. 'Gang Leader Kongō') is a Japanese manga series written and illustrated by Nakaba Suzuki. The manga was serialized in Shogakukan's shōnen manga magazine Weekly Shōnen Sunday from October 2007 to March 2010, with its chapters collected in twelve tankōbon volumes. The series was re-launched by Kodansha in six shinsōban volumes.

== Plot ==
Akira Kongō is looking to take down the "23 District Project", which involves banchōs from twenty-three districts of Tokyo fighting for the right to control Japan. Without meaning to, he becomes a participant with the alias "Kongō Banchō", and must take down other banchōs while searching for the leaders of the project.

== Characters ==
Akira Kongō (金剛 晄, Kongō Akira)
Akira is a large yet gentle young man known for his unwavering loyalty and immense physical strength. He rarely loses his composure unless those close to him are threatened, and his words often compel others to reconsider their actions. After rescuing Hinako from Kiriu Tōya, he becomes the banchō of Chiyoda district, prioritizing justice over power or wealth. He opposes the District Plan but finds contentment in life's simple pleasures. A student at Raimei Senior High School, he adheres to straightforward principles, retaliating against those who harm his friends. His superhuman strength allows him to harden his fists like lead, though his size hinders precision tasks. Beyond confronting rival banchōs, he aids residents of his district with their troubles.
Hinako Sakura (桜陽 菜子, Sakura Hinako)
Classmate and friend of Akira. When Akira first told her about the District Plan she laughed and reported to a cop, said cop was in on the plan and captured her, after which Akira fought to saved her and became friends. She has a little sister named Tsukimi.
Kiriu Tōya (桐雨 刀也, Tōya Kiriu)
The Chiyoda district banchō, normally known as Iai banchō (居合番長). He has a bishōnen appearance and seems very cultured and calm. He is defeated by Akira, and after that, Akira has taken Tōya's place as the district's banchō. Tōya eventually joins Akira, believing that he has what it takes to be the winner of the District Project and is willing to die to help him succeed.
Yū Akiyama (秋山 優, Akiyama Yū)
The Hikyō banchō (卑怯番長) (cowardly banchō). His catchphrase is "let's fight in a fair, cowardly way." He uses any means necessary to win; he has no compunction about resorting to lies, sneak attacks or kidnapping. He was defeated by Akira, and joins him after he saved him and his underling (one of his little brothers). His reason for helping Akira is so that Akira will be indebted to help him when needed and he plans to backstab Akira when he wins control over all the districts. Actually, Yū is thankful to Akira, who helped save Yuu's family even if he tried to kill him.
Kobushi Shirayukinomiya (白雪宮 拳, Shirayukinomiya Kobushi)
The Gōriki banchō (剛力番長) is a tomboyish girl from a wealthy family. Despite her small stature, she possesses immense strength due to her "hyperion constitution"—a rare condition granting extremely dense, flexible muscles and enhanced organ function, though requiring constant food intake to maintain her accelerated metabolism. Presenting herself as a vigilante, she indiscriminately destroys parts of her district deemed "evil," including a potentially hazardous chemical plant. Akira defeats her in combat, demonstrating her reckless approach. Following this confrontation, she reconsiders her methods and forms an alliance with him.
Raionji Manson (来音寺 萬尊, Manson Raionji)
The banchō of Sumida district, known as the Nenbutsu banchō (念仏番長), controls Kōji Senior High students through brainwashing, running a cult-like following. He profits by selling merchandise bearing his image, displaying greed and self-absorption. His apparent psychic abilities—blasting opponents and levitating—are revealed as tricks; his true power comes from an enlarged diaphragm concealed under his coat, granting extraordinary breath control. After Akira defeats him, his followers abandon him, believing Akira to be the reincarnation of Acala. He later allies with Akira, convinced of his righteousness after witnessing his loyalty. Accepting Akira as a divine figure, he renounces his former ways.
Haruka Kodama (児玉 遥, Kodama Haruka)
The Sasori banchō (サソリ番長) is the former second-generation leader of the all-female motorcycle gang "Red Scorpio". Originally mentored by Aiko Tsukishima—Takeshi Kongō's late wife and mother of Rai Kongō—she assumes guardianship of Rai after Aiko's death, vowing revenge against Takeshi. Initially mistaking Akira for his brother due to their resemblance, she attacks him relentlessly until realizing her error. Following their confrontation, she allies with Akira to locate Takeshi. She demonstrates unacknowledged romantic interest in Yū Akiyama, unaware of his identity as the Hikyō banchō.
Takeshi Kongō (金剛 猛, Kongō Takeshi)
The Nippon banchō (日本番長, Nihon banchō), Takeshi is Akira's older brother and a longtime participant in the 23 Districts Project created by their father. He becomes fully active only after Akira disrupts the project's progress by seizing control of half of Tokyo's districts. Though always the stronger fighter, Takeshi accelerates his rise to power after Akira forces the project into stagnation. In response, Takeshi forms the Dark Student Council, expanding the conflict nationwide. Any banchō who conquers one of Japan's 46 remaining prefectures earns a seat on the council. Under Takeshi's leadership, the group seeks to dismantle Japan's existing society and rebuild it under his rule.

== Media ==
=== Manga ===
Written and illustrated by Nakaba Suzuki, Kongō Banchō was serialized in Shogakukan's shōnen manga magazine Weekly Shōnen Sunday from October 24, 2007, to March 10, 2010. Shogakukan collected its chapters in twelve tankōbon volumes, released from February 18, 2008, to July 16, 2010. The series was re-launched by Kodansha in six shinsōban volumes, published from June 15 to August 17, 2018.

==== Volumes ====
No.	Release date	ISBN
1	February 18, 2008	978-4-09-121293-1
2	May 16, 2008	978-4-09-121394-5
3	August 11, 2008	978-4-09-121458-4
4	November 18, 2008	978-4-09-121510-9
5	February 18, 2009	978-4-09-121595-6
6	April 17, 2009	978-4-09-121899-5
7	July 17, 2009	978-4-09-121707-3
8	October 16, 2009	978-4-09-121787-5
9	January 18, 2010	978-4-09-122136-0
10	April 16, 2010	978-4-09-122265-7
11	June 18, 2010	978-4-09-122328-9
12	July 16, 2010	978-4-09-122420-0

==== New edition ====
No.	Release date	ISBN
1	June 15, 2018	978-4-06-511441-4
2	June 15, 2018	978-4-06-511442-1
3	July 17, 2018	978-4-06-511792-7
4	July 17, 2018	978-4-06-511793-4
5	August 17, 2018	978-4-06-512233-4
6	August 17, 2018	978-4-06-512234-1

=== Other media ===
Characters of the series appeared in Weekly Shōnen Sunday and Weekly Shōnen Magazine crossover game Shōnen Sunday & Shōnen Magazine White Comic (少年サンデー&少年マガジン WHITE COMIC) released for Nintendo DS in 2009.
