= Banchō (position) =

Governmental position in Ritsuryō period Japan; leader of a group of delinquents

Banchō (番長) historically refers a governmental position during the Ritsuryō period in Japan. In the modern era, banchō is the leader of a group of male Japanese juvenile delinquents. The term banchō became less common through the 1970s and into the 1980s in Japan.

== Governmental position ==
Under the Ritsuryō system between the 8th and 10th centuries, a banchō was a lower position in the Imperial Guard. In the Engi-Shiki there are several references to people holding this position.

== Juvenile delinquency ==
In Japan in the 20th century, the term banchō refers to a leader of juvenile delinquents in middle and high schools. It is thought that this current meaning originates from the original meaning of the term—the personalities of guard commanders. An alternative is that the word derives from tōbanchō (当番長), a term for a position in the former Japanese army. Female banchō are called sukeban (スケ番). The typical image of a banchō is an uncouth fighter who has a strong sense of gang honor. Banchō who rule several schools and have control of other banchō are called sōban (総番), and in elementary schools and under, the term for banchō is gakitaishō (ガキ大将).

In reality, though, banchō were becoming increasingly rare in the 1970s, and by the 1980s the term was relatively old-fashioned. Vestiges of the word still remained, though, such as in the nicknames for baseball players Kazuhiro Kiyohara and Daisuke Miura. By the end of the 20th century, the term almost did not exist at all, though groups of delinquents who committed crimes began to stand out. The term became a title of honor for people with leadership personalities, and who stood against tough elements, and in turn, the negative connotation of the word diminished. It also became a scornful term for people who had a great deal of bravado.

On the other hand, in the manga world, due to a backlash, a genre called "banchō manga" has been created, with there being various types of banchō.

== Characteristics ==
In some schools, students would hold secret elections to pick banchō. Occasionally there would be fights between banchō and their subordinates, the loser of which would become subordinate to the winner.

== See also ==
- Battle Royale II: Requiem
- Cromartie High School / Cromartie High – The Movie
- Crows Zero
- Bōsōzoku
- Kenka Bancho: Badass Rumble
- Sanctuary (manga)
- Sukeban
- Kongō Banchō
- Kunio-kun
- Tokyo Revengers
- High&Low The Movie
