= Misaki Kuno =

Japanese voice actress (born 1993)

- 久野 美咲
- Born: January 19, 1993 (age 33); Tokyo, Japan
- Occupations: Actress; voice actress
- Years active: 1999–present
- Agent: Office Restart
- Notable work: The Seven Deadly Sins as Hawk; WIXOSS as Tama; Happy Sugar Life as Shio Kōbe; Lycoris Recoil as Kurumi; Kiznaiver as Nico Niiyama; Genshin Impact as Klee; March Comes In like a Lion as Momo Kawamoto; Made in Abyss as Faputa; 86 as Frederica Rosenfort
- Height: 150 cm (4 ft 11 in)

Misaki Kuno (久野 美咲, Kuno Misaki; born January 19, 1993) is a Japanese actress and singer who specializes in voice acting.

== Biography ==
As a child, Misaki appeared on stage shows such as Musical Wizard of Oz and Wandering. In 2003, she made her debut as a voice actress in the dubbing of the Korean film Phone. Misaki was active in dubbing foreign films early in her career, but since 2010, her appearance in anime and game works has increased. Her voice quality is described as like the "real voice of a young child" and a "voice with a unique presence".

== Filmography ==
=== Anime ===
2010

- Oreimo (Bridget Evans)

2012

- Black Rock Shooter (Hiro Kuroi)

2013

- Day Break Illusion (Cerebrum)
- Galilei Donna (Grande Rosso)
- Log Horizon (Serara)
- Oreimo 2 (Bridget Evans)
- Problem Children Are Coming from Another World, Aren't They? (Melln)
- Ro-Kyu-Bu! SS (Mimi Balguerie)

2014

- Atelier Escha & Logy: Alchemists of the Dusk Sky (Coo)
- If Her Flag Breaks (Kurumiko Daishikyougawa)
- Log Horizon 2 (Serara)
- Mysterious Joker (Roko)
- Nanana's Buried Treasure (Saki Yoshino)
- Noragami (Keiichi Ono, Hinaha)
- Selector Infected WIXOSS (Tama)
- Strike the Blood (Lydianne Didieh)
- The Irregular at Magic High School (Nanami Kasuga)
- The Seven Deadly Sins (Hawk)
- World Conquest Zvezda Plot (Kate Hoshimiya/Lady Venera)
- Tenkai Knights (Ukkikkī)

2015

- Durarara!!x2 (Akane Awakusu)
- Lupin the Third Part IV (Carla Gautieri)
- Mysterious Joker 2nd Season (Roko)
- Noragami Aragoto (Hinaha)
- Plastic Memories (Nina)
- Robot Girls Z+ (Pon-chan)
- Senki Zesshō Symphogear GX (Elfnein)
- The Idolmaster Cinderella Girls 2nd Season (Nina Ichihara)
- Utawarerumono: The False Faces (Shinonon)

2016

- Ace Attorney (Harumi Ayasato)
- Big Order (Sena Hoshimiya)
- Dimension W (Debbie Eastriver)
- Kamiwaza Wanda (Yui)
- Kiznaiver (Nico Niyama)
- Magi: Adventure of Sinbad (Kikiriku)
- March Comes in Like a Lion (Momo Kawamoto, Shiro-chan)
- Myriad Colors Phantom World (Kurumi Kumamakura)
- Mysterious Joker 3rd Season (Roko)
- Rilu Rilu Fairilu (Powawa)

2017

- Akiba's Trip: The Animation (Tasujin Ratu)
- Battle Girl High School (Sakura Fujimiya)
- Chō Shōnen Tantei-dan NEO (Noro-chan)
- March Comes in Like a Lion 2nd Season (Momo Kawamoto, Shiro-chan)
- Monster Hunter Stories: Ride On (Nuts)
- Sagrada Reset (Mari Kurakawa)
- Senki Zesshō Symphogear AXZ (Elfnein)
- The Ancient Magus' Bride (Hugo)
- The Idolmaster Cinderella Girls Theater 2nd Season (Nina Ichihara)

2018

- As Miss Beelzebub Likes (Belphegor)
- Dragon Pilot: Hisone and Masotan (Hisone Amakasu)
- Fairy Tail: Final Season (Abel)
- Happy Sugar Life (Shio Kōbe)
- Last Period (Dia)
- Lostorage conflated WIXOSS (Tama)
- The Seven Deadly Sins: Revival of the Commandments (Hawk)

2019

- Azur Lane (Nagato, Ping Hai)
- Carole & Tuesday (GGK)
- Endro! (Mao)
- Senki Zesshō Symphogear XV (Elfnein)
- Senryu Girl (Kino Yakobe)
- The Seven Deadly Sins: Wrath of the Gods (Hawk)

2020

- Log Horizon: Destruction of the Round Table (Serara)
- Mewkledreamy (Tsugi)
- Re:Zero − Starting Life in Another World (Typhon)
- Seton Academy: Join the Pack! (Yukari Komori)
- The Misfit of Demon King Academy (Zeshia Kanon Ijaysica)

2021

- 86 (Frederica Rosenfort)
- Godzilla Singular Point (Pero 2)
- Non Non Biyori Nonstop (Shiori)
- The Dungeon of Black Company (Rim)
- The Seven Deadly Sins: Dragon's Judgement (Hawk)

2022

- Aharen-san Is Indecipherable (Ren Aharen)
- Akebi's Sailor Uniform (Kao Akebi)
- Black Rock Shooter: Dawn Fall (Black Trike)
- Insect Land (Mia)
- Legend of Mana: The Teardrop Crystal (Miss Yuka)
- Lycoris Recoil (Kurumi)
- Made in Abyss: The Golden City of the Scorching Sun (Faputa)
- Prima Doll (Chiyo)
- Princess Connect! Re:Dive Season 2 (Misaki)
- Smile of the Arsnotoria the Animation (Arsnotoria)
- Summer Time Rendering (Haine)
- Utawarerumono: Mask of Truth (Shinonon)

2023

- Am I Actually the Strongest? (Tearietta Luseiannel)
- Beyblade X (Hina)
- Fly Me to the Moon Season 2 (Kagami Kyuuma)
- In Another World with My Smartphone Season 2 (Reliel Rehn Refreese)
- The Apothecary Diaries (Xiaolan)
- The Diary of Ochibi-san (Shiroppoi)
- The Fire Hunter (Touko)
- The Idolmaster Cinderella Girls U149 (Nina Ichihara)
- The Misfit of Demon King Academy II (Zeshia Kanon Ijaysica)
- Urusei Yatsura (Sugar)

2024

- Beyblade X (Hina)
- KamiErabi God.app Season 2 (Eko Sasaki)
- Kinokoinu: Mushroom Pup (Plum)
- Mission: Yozakura Family (Ai)
- Studio Apartment, Good Lighting, Angel Included (Shiu)
- The Ossan Newbie Adventurer (Alicerette Draqul)
- The Strongest Tank's Labyrinth Raids (Amon)

2025

- Digimon Beatbreak (Chiropmon)
- Momentary Lily (Sazanka Yoshino)
- Reincarnated as a Neglected Noble: Raising My Baby Brother with Memories from My Past Life (Ageha)
- The Daily Life of a Middle-Aged Online Shopper in Another World (Anemone)
- Witch Watch (Kuromitsu)

2026

- Dandivine (Aki)
- Daemons of the Shadow Realm (Gabby)
- Jaadugar: A Witch in Mongolia (Sorghaghtani)
- Kaya-chan Isn't Scary (Saku-chan)
- Roll Over and Die (Eterna Rinebow)
- Tetsuryō! Meet with Tetsudō Musume (Miyabi Kinugawa)
- The Daughter of the Demon Lord Is Too Kind! (Doux)
- The Exiled Heavy Knight Knows How to Game the System (Hilde)
- Witch Hat Atelier (Brushbuddy)

=== OVA ===
2010

- Black Rock Shooter (Mato's younger brother)

2016

- Strike the Blood II (Didier Lydianne)

=== ONA ===
2024

- Rising Impact (Gawain Nanaumi)
- Yu-Gi-Oh! Card Game The Chronicles (Poplar)

=== Anime films ===
- King of Thorn (2010) (Alice)
- Go! Princess PreCure The Movie: Go! Go!! Splendid Triple Feature!!! (2015) (Pan)
- Selector destructed WIXOSS (2016) (Tama)
- Maquia: When the Promised Flower Blooms (2018) (Medmel)
- The Seven Deadly Sins the Movie: Prisoners of the Sky (2018) (Hawk)
- Sound! Euphonium: The Movie – Our Promise: A Brand New Day (2019) (Satsuki Suzuki)
- The Seven Deadly Sins: Cursed by Light (2021) (Hawk)
- The First Slam Dunk (2022) (Anna Miyagi)
- Maboroshi (2023) (Itsumi)
- Doraemon: Nobita's Art World Tales (2025) (Chai)
- Eiga Odekake Kozame Tokai no Otomodachi (2025) (Usame-chan)
- Made in Abyss: Mezameru Shinpi (2026) (Faputa)

=== Video games ===
2014

- Granblue Fantasy (Camieux)

2015

- The Great Ace Attorney: Adventures (Iris Wilson)
- Kantai Collection (Littorio/Italia, Roma, Takanami)
- Mighty No. 9 (Cryosphere)
- Battle Girl High School (Sakura Fujimiya)

2016

- Shin Megami Tensei IV: Apocalypse (Toki)
- Harmonia (Tipi)

2017

- Xenoblade Chronicles 2 (Poppi (Japanese: ハナ, Hana))
- Azur Lane (2017-2024, ROC Ping-Hai (Japanese: 平海), IJN Nagato (Japanese: 長門))
- Magia Record (Yuma Chitose)

2018

- Princess Connect! Re:Dive (Misaki)

2019

- Another Eden (Lovely)
- Fate/Grand Order (Beni-Enma)
- The Seven Deadly Sins: Grand Cross (Hawk)

2020

- Persona 5 Strikers (Sophia)
- Fire Emblem Heroes (2020-2024, Mirabilis, Safy)
- Genshin Impact (Klee)
- Epic Seven (Achates)

2021

- Smile of the Arsnotoria (Arsnotoria)
- The King of Fighters All Star (Hawk)
- Cookie Run: Kingdom (Custard Cookie III)

2023

- Goddess of Victory: Nikke (Cocoa, Kurumi)
- Fate/Samurai Remnant (Ogasawara Kaya, Ototachibana-hime)

2024

- Sword of Convallaria (Beryl)

2025

- Rune Factory: Guardians of Azuma (Suzu)

2026

- Petit Planet (Elsasani)

2027

- The Apothecary Diaries: The False Imperial Brother (Xiaolan)

=== Dubbing ===
2003

- Finding Nemo (Darla)
- Aliens (Rebecca "Newt" Jorden)

2013

- Curse of Chucky (Alice Pierce)

2014

- Cold Comes the Night (Sophia (Ursula Parker))

2017

- Ouija: Origin of Evil (Doris Zander (Lulu Wilson))

2019

- A Series of Unfortunate Events (Sunny)
- A Dog's Journey (Toddler CJ)

2020

- Stillwater (Karl)
- Good Boys (Lily (Midori Francis))

2022

- Oni: Thunder God's Tale (Daruma-chan)
- Firestarter (Charlie McGee (Ryan Kiera Armstrong))

2023

- Transformers: EarthSpark (Mo Malto)
- The Old Way (Brooke Briggs (Ryan Kiera Armstrong))

== Discography ==
- "Hoshikuzu Cosplay☆Witch! Desu! Omega" (星くずこすぷれ☆うぃっち！です！・おめが, Hoshikuzu Kosupure☆Witchi! Desu! Omega; lit. I'm The Stardust Cosplay☆Witch! Omega)
