= List of WIXOSS characters =

The following is a list of characters for the WIXOSS franchise, which consists of two main anime series, selector infected WIXOSS and Lostorage incited WIXOSS, along with several spin-off manga series.

== selector infected series ==
=== Main characters ===
Ruko Kominato (小湊 るう子, Kominato Rūko)
Voiced by: Ai Kakuma (Japanese); Lindsay Seidel (English)
The main protagonist, who possesses the LRIG card, Tama. She is unsure of what kind of wish she wants and is generally the spectator of the dark nature of WIXOSS. Despite becoming more and more aware of the terrible nature of the Selector battles, she often finds herself enjoying battles. Ruko later finds her own wish, which is to free the LRIGs from their cards and return them to their own lives. In the end of season 1, Ruko loses Tama, and her new LRIG card becomes Yuki. In Spread, she adds the condition to turn all LRIGs into humans so that even those who were originally LRIGs can also become human, which she does in the final episode. She starts looking for Tama some time afterwards. Ruko has already become a high school student alongside Yuzuki and Hitoe in conflated. She is approached by Kiyoi who asked for her help to put a stop to the new Selector Battle, but she refused out of concern for Tama's safety. Unfortunately, she is then chosen to become Selector once more.
Tama (タマ)
Voiced by: Misaki Kuno (Japanese); Monica Rial (English)
Ruko's LRIG, white in color. She has a cutesy appearance and lively personality. In battle, however, she displays a frightening bloodlust. After failing to form a contract with Ruko, she ends up becoming Ulith's LRIG. She at first forgot about Mayu, but remembers fully later in Spread. She is the 'Girl of Light', an LRIG created by Mayu, and her true name is Shiro. She later rejects taking over Iona's body, and returns to Mayu as a result, only to shortly after get locked up by Mayu. She is later freed and merges with Yuki. In the series end after Ruko's wish, Tama is shown to have become a human, sitting on a rooftop. In Lostorage Conflated series, she lives with Ruko and her family.
Iona Urazoe (浦添 伊緒奈, Urazoe Iona) / Yuki (ユキ)
Voiced by: Asami Seto (Japanese); Anastasia Muñoz (English)
Known for most of the series as Iona Urazoe, a fashion model at the same agency as Akira, who can sense what a Selector's wish is. She has a keen thirst for battles and takes an interest in Ruko, feeling that she is just like her. She possesses the LRIG card, Ulith. After becoming an Eternal Girl, she becomes Ruko's LRIG, while Ulith takes over her body as part of her wish is to become the LRIG of a Selector who is stronger than her. In Spread, It is later revealed that she is originally an LRIG named Kuro that created by Mayu along with Tama, and she's referred as "The Girl of Dark". Yuki also begins to bond with Ruko, and later becomes her friend, and like Tama desires to help Mayu become their friend as well. After the original Iona Urazoe manages to return to her original body, Ruko gives her the name Yuki to distinguish them. After Ruko does her wish in the last episode of Spread, although Yuki is not shown, she is assumed to also have become human, as Ruko's wish was to turn even those who were originally LRIGs into humans.
Kiyoi Mizushima (水嶋清衣, Mizushima Kiyoi) / Piruluk (ピルルク, Piruruku)
Voiced by: Saori Ōnishi (Japanese); Brittney Karbowski (English)
Kiyoi Mizushima is the main heroine of Selector infectred WIXOSS - Peeping Analyze and Lostorage Conflated WIXOSS. She is a former LRIG from the first series Selector Infected WIXOSS under the name Pirulurk. She first reappears as a Selector again in Episode 2 as Chinatsu's first opponent, who she promptly defeats. She later reveals her past as an LRIG to Chinatsu as well the events surrounding the first Selector Battles, in addition to warning her about Kou Satomi. Feeling partially responsible for creating the new Selector Battle, she intends to put a stop to it for good. To achieve this goal, she starts gathering Selectors to help her in Conflated. Her backstory is revealed in the manga adaptation, Selector infected WIXOSS - Peeping Analyze. She was cold and anti-social due to her experience of being betrayed by her supposed friend during elementary school. For this reason, she refuse to open her heart when her classmate, Ayumi Sakaguchi, constantly tried to befriend her. When Sakaguchi got hit by a truck in attempt to save her and realizing that Sakaguchi truly wanted to become friends with her, Kiyoi became determined to save her and became a Selector with an LRIG named Remember. However, when becoming an LRIG Pirulurk, Mayu shows her the outcome of her wish: Remember, who now inhabits her body, "saves" Sakaguchi by turning off her life support and leaving her to die, ending her suffering. Since then she set her goal to take revenge on Remember. Unfortunately, as Pirulurk, she is known as LRIG who brings misfortune to her Selectors as they can never win. Kiyoi's desire for revenge faltered when she was paired with a Selector named Amika Hashimoto who not only bears resemblance with Sakaguchi but also has similar wish as hers when she was a Selector. When she reunited with Remember who was using her body, Kiyoi evolved into Level 5 and used her power to rewrote Amika's wish that resulted with Amika having her wish fulfilled when they lost against Remember. Feeling betrayed, Mayu punished Kiyoi by returning her to her real body in hope she will suffer from the weight of her sins, but this allowed Kiyoi to be reunited with Amika.

=== Selectors ===
Yuzuki Kurebayashi (紅林 遊月, Kurebayashi Yuzuki)
Voiced by: Ayane Sakura (Japanese); Apphia Yu (English)
One of Ruko's best friends at school, who possesses the LRIG card, Hanayo. She has feelings for her twin brother, Kazuki, and desires to use her wish to make such a relationship possible. She is straightforward and bad at containing her emotions. She fulfils the conditions of her wish and enters a ritual with Hanayo. However, Hanayo takes over Yuzuki's body to receive the benefits of her wish, whilst Yuzuki becomes Hitoe's second LRIG. She is freed after Ruko has her wish granted in the last episode of Spread. In Lostorage Conflated series, she is chosen to become Selector again in the new Selector Battle.
Hitoe Uemura (植村 一衣, Uemura Hitoe)
Voiced by: Ai Kayano (Japanese); Tia Ballard (English)
A shy and timid girl, who possesses the LRIG card, Midoriko. Her wish is to have friends, which she appears to fulfil herself after Ruko and Yuzuki befriend her. However, upon losing three battles, she becomes unable to make friends, losing her memories and becoming pained by any thoughts or attempts at friendship. Later on, she receives another LRIG card containing Yuzuki and becomes a Selector again, while becoming a bit more cold after her next fight with Ruko. In her final fight with Ruko, Hitoe reveals to have gotten her memory back a while back, revealing her cold act to be a facade, and wanted to become an Eternal Girl to help free Yuzuki from her card. She becomes friends with them again after this. In Lostorage Conflated series, she is chosen to become Selector again in the new Selector Battle.
Akira Aoi (蒼井 晶, Aoi Akira)
Voiced by: Chinatsu Akasaki (Japanese); Jamie Marchi (English)
A fashion model who, despite having a cute personality in public, is actually incredibly sadistic. She has a strong hatred towards Iona, her wish being to ruin her life. She possesses the LRIG card, Piruluk. She ends up losing three battles and receives a large scar on her face, ruining her modelling career. In Spread, she receives another LRIG, Milulun, and falls for Ulith, following anything she orders her to do. In the series finale of Spread, she is shown to be working by Iona's side, and has a book about her resolution on blue WIXOSS decks. In Lostorage Conflated series, she is still working as a model and is chosen to become a Selector again.
Chiyori (ちより, Chiyori)
Voiced by: Mako Morino (Japanese); Lara Woodhull (English)
An energetic school girl who possesses the LRIG card, Eldora. She is delusional about WIXOSS believing that it is her destiny to be the heroine in the game just like in the novel she likes to read, not taking the consequences of the game seriously. As such, her wish is to become a LRIG much to Eldora's annoyance. She is eliminated when she suffers her third loss in a battle against Hitoe that Eldora lost on purpose to spare her the pain of battles by having the reverse of her wish become reality. In the series end of Spread, she is seen with a note as Ruko passes her.
Fumio Futase (ふたせ 文緒, Futase Fumio)
Voiced by: Harumi Sakurai (Japanese); Felecia Angelle (English)
A novelist who is the author of the WIXOSS novel that Chiyori likes to read. It is later revealed that Futase was previously the real Fumio's LRIG, who took over her body after Fumio became an Eternal Girl, her experiences serving as inspiration for her book. In the last episode of Spread, both Futase and Fumio return to their own bodies.
Iona Urazoe (浦添 伊緒奈, Urazoe Iona)
Voiced by: Mamiko Noto (Japanese); Jad Saxton (English)
The real Iona Urazoe who made a contract with Yuki, whom she simply referred as 'LRIG'. Her wish is to no longer be Iona Urazoe since she grew tired of many people's expectation for her to succeed her family's business. Once her wish is fulfilled, she met Mayu in the white room who then told her the entire truth behind the Selector battle, but Iona was content with the truth since her wish has been fulfilled. This angered Mayu and as the result, Mayu purposely sent her as an LRIG of Selectors who are not compatible with the battle. After Ulith's wish is fulfilled, Iona returns to her hollow body since Tama refused to enter it. At the end of Spread, it is shown that she's still working beside Akira.

=== LRIGs ===
Hanayo (花代)
Voiced by: Ayako Kawasumi (Japanese); Caitlin Glass (English)
Yuzuki's LRIG, red in color, composed and keen. After Yuzuki fulfills her battle conditions, Hanayo takes over Yuzuki's body in order to receive her wish. Initially, approaches Kazuki only to fulfil Yuzuki's wish, Hanayo started to develop genuine feelings for Kazuki as they spent their times together. This makes her feel no longer able to fulfil Yuzuki's wish out of fear that she will become a Selector to wish to be happy with Kazuki and betray Yuzuki. She is freed after Ruko's wish in the series finale of Spread, seen as a human with short hair observing Kazuki and Yuzuki briefly near a playground.
Midoriko (緑子)
Voiced by: Minami Takahashi (Japanese); Carli Mosier (English)
Hitoe's LRIG, green in color, passionate and loyal. She is sent to another Selector after Hitoe lost her third battle. At the end of Spread, she is seen as a human, meeting Hitoe on a bus.
Piruluk (ピルルク, Piruruku)
Voiced by: Saori Ōnishi (Japanese); Brittney Karbowski (English)
Akira's LRIG, blue in color. Her personality is cold and indifferent, which, as Akira remarks, is reminiscent of Iona. Following Ruko's wish, she is seen as a human in the end of Spread reading a magazine. She appears again in Lostorage series.
Ulith (ウリス, Urisu)
Voiced by: Rie Kugimiya (Japanese); Bryn Apprill (English)
Iona's LRIG, black in color. Her original name is Rumi Igarashi (五十嵐 留未, Igarashi Rumi). She has a sadistic personality similar to Akira and enjoys mocking weaker opponents. After Iona becomes an Eternal Girl, she takes over Iona's body, later becoming Tama's new Selector. She eventually becomes another Eternal Girl, with Iona's body returning to its original owner. She becomes Mayu's LRIG since her new wish is to become an LRIG of a selector who can bring greater despair to others. When Mayu gives Ruko a chance for an instant win if she correctly guess what the colour of her card is, Ruko correctly guessed that Mayu's card has no colour, resulting with Mayu's loss and Ulith destroyed into nothingness.
Eldora (エルドラ, Erudora)
Voiced by: Satomi Arai (Japanese); Mariela Ortiz (English)
Chiyori's LRIG, blue in color, who cares more for her well being than her own. She loses their third battle so that Chiyori's wish to play WIXOSS forever will be reversed and she won't end up as an LRIG. After losing, she climbs out of her card and leaves. She can be seen at the end of WIXOSS Spread, nervously peeking from behind a wall whilst Chiyori reads the note Eldora left her asking if she would like to be friends.
Milulun (ミルルン, Mirurun)
Voiced by: Rina Hidaka (Japanese); Sarah Wiedenheft (English)
Akira's second LRIG. Also blue in colour. Like Akira, she acts cheery and lively, but has shown indifference towards the suffering of others, as shown when she mocks Akira after the latter was shocked by Ulith's betrayal. At the end of Spread, she is seen as human, getting down from the same bus that Piruluk rode.
Anne (アン)
Voiced by: Juri Nagatsuma (Japanese); Natalie Hoover (English)
Futase's LRIG, green in colour. She wears a standard Japanese hakama with big ribbon on her hair.

=== Other characters ===
Kazuki Kurebayashi (紅林 香月)
Voiced by: Yūsuke Kobayashi (Japanese); Micah Solusod (English)
Yuzuki's twin brother, who is one of the few non-Selectors to know about the secrets of WIXOSS. He had been oblivious of Yuzuki's feelings for him until after she had fulfilled her wish. He has reciprocated those feelings, unaware that Yuzuki's body had become inhabited by Hanayo until near the end of Spread.
Ayumu Kominato (小湊 歩, Kominato Ayumu)
Voiced by: Haruki Ishiya (Japanese); Clifford Chapin (English)
Ruko's older brother who gave Ruko her WIXOSS deck.
Hatsu Kominato (小湊 ハツ, Kominato Hatsu)
Voiced by: Tamie Kubota (Japanese); Juli Erickson (English)
Ruko's grandmother.
Honoka (ほのか)
Voiced by: Yuiko Tatsumi (Japanese); Alex Moore (English)
Ruko and Yuzuki's classmate from school.
Mayu (繭, Mayu)
Voiced by: Risa Taneda (Japanese); Alexis Tipton (English)
A mysterious white woman who oversees the Selector battles, LRIGs, and Eternal Girls. She grew up in a secluded room and created the Selector battles as a consequence of her loneliness. This changes upon Ruko talking with her in the final episode of Spread. After being embraced by Ruko, Mayu is freed into the outside world.

== Lostorage incited series ==
=== Main characters ===
Suzuko Homura (穂村 すず子, Homura Suzuko)
Voiced by: Chinami Hashimoto

Suzuko Homura is one of the two main heroines of Lostorage Incited WIXOSS. At the start of the series, she moves back to Ikebukuro after spending some time in Hokkaido due to family issues. After initially having trouble fitting in with her class and making friends, she buys a WIXOSS deck and meets the LRIG of the Beginning who becomes her LRIG, Ril. She then gets wrapped up in the new Selector Battles. After meeting Chinatsu again and seeing the new changes in her friend, she becomes disheartened and depressed for a while but soon makes the resolve to protect both her and Chinatsu's shared memories by become stronger in WIXOSS.

Chinatsu Morikawa (森川 千夏, Morikawa Chinatsu)
Voiced by: Yuka Iguchi

Chinatsu Morikawa is another one of the two main heroines of Lostorage Incited WIXOSS. At the start of the series, she is first seen attending a private high school while taking a part-time job at the same time. Due to her father's company going bankrupt in her 3rd year of Middle School, her family has many financial difficulties. She meets her LRIG, Mel, and after a series of misfortune incidents in her real life and losses in the Selector Battles, she ends up fully embracing Selector Battles following her first win. Chinatsu then takes on a much colder personality after this and starts working for Kou Satomi as a recruiter for his booked matches.

Riru (リル)
Voiced by: Shizuka Itō

Ril is the LRIG of Suzuko Homura. She was created from Suzuko's memories of Chinatsu and thus has many of the same personality traits as Chinatsu.

Meru (メル)
Voiced by: Hisako Kanemoto

Mel is the LRIG of Chinatsu Morikawa. She was created from Chinatsu's memories of Suzuko and thus has many of the same personality traits as Suzuko.

=== Selectors ===
Hanna Mikage (御影はんな, Mikage Hanna)
Voiced by: Yurika Kubo

Hanna Mikage is Suzuko's best friend in school. She plays WIXOSS in hopes of finding out the truth of what happened when her brother Yuuto died. When she finally gained enough coins and recovered her memory when Yuuto died, she was devastated to remember that on the day he died, she took him to play hide-and-seek at an abandoned building, and Yuuto died from falling off the building while find a place to hide from his sister. Hanna shut herself ever since, but then recovered with the support from her older sister and Suzuko.

Kagari Yukino (雪野かがり, Yukino Kagari)
Voiced by: Asuka Nishi

Kagari Yukino is the high-school aged Selector of Yukime and was Chinatsu's second opponent in Lostorage. She is the first Selector to suffer the consequences of losing all of her coins, allowing her LRIG, Yukime to take over her body.

Rio Koshiba (小柴莉緒, Koshiba Rio)
Voiced by: Natsumi Hioka

Rio Koshiba is the very young Selector of Mama, who attends a public elementary school. She battles and loses to Chinatsu in episode 2. However, some time later, she reveals to Chinatsu during a play-date that her mother died while she was in the 3rd grade, and that her wish is to erase the memory of her mother's death in the hopes of seeing her mother again.

Shohei Shirai (白井翔平, Shirai Shohei)
Voiced by: Shinsuke Sugawara

Shohei Shirai is the high-school aged Selector of Donor. He is a unique Selector as he insists on waiting out the 90-day time limit, instead of battling to win like the other Selectors. He has known Chinatsu since they were both in middle-school, and has had a crush on her ever since then. After finding out that Chinatsu has been working for the Bookmaker, Kou Satomi, Shohei makes repeated attempts to save Chinatsu from him. When Kou arranged him to battle against Rio, Shohei couldn't bring himself to fight the little girl and ended up letting himself be defeated, resulting him disappeared and his body replaced by Donor.

Shou Narumi (鳴海勝, Narumi Shou)
Voiced by: Kazuyuki Okitsu

Shou Narumi is the Selector of Aya. He initially participates in the battles in order to find his real younger sister who is also named 'Aya,' who was at one time a Selector who had lost all of her coins and ended up "disappearing." However, despite his best efforts, Shou has problems fighting against girls who remind him of his sister. He then battled Kou who claimed to be the one responsible for his sister's disappearance, and got defeated.

Sou Sumida (墨田壮, Sumida Sou)
Voiced by: Junji Majima

Sou Sumida is the Selector of Guzuko and an active fighter in the Selector Battles. He initially appears as Suzuko's first opponent but winds up losing to her. He has a habit of targeting, battling and taunting weak players who are new to WIXOSS battles.

=== LRIGs ===
LRIG of Beginnings (始まりのルリグ, Hajimari no Rurigu)
Voiced by: Mari Hino

The LRIG of Beginnings is a very mysterious LRIG who appears before newly chosen Selectors candidates, in order to guide them through the registration process to become a Selector by recording the Selector's memories and asking them to name her in order to create their LRIG. She acts as a default template for most of the LRIGs that appear in the series, though the truth behind her origins are still unclear.

Nanashi (ナナシ, Nanashi)
Voiced by: Shiori Izawa

Nanashi is the LRIG of Hanna Mikage.

Aya (あーや, Aya)
Voiced by: Yuri Yamaoka

Aya is the LRIG of Shou Narumi. She has a tendency of acting cute, although she has a habit of getting angry with her Selector, whenever he lets his sister issues prevent him from winning a battle. When she is angry like this, she uses delinquent language.

Donor (ドーナ, Donor)
Voiced by: Aya Suzaki

Donor is the LRIG of Shohei Shirai.

Guzuko (グズ子, Guzuko)
Voiced by: Saori Gotō

Guzuko is the LRIG of Sou Sumida.

Mama (ママ, Mama)
Voiced by: Sayumi Watabe

Mama is the LRIG of Rio Koshiba.

Yukime (ゆきめ, Yukime)
Voiced by: Hitomi Nabatame

Yukime is the LRIG of Kagari Yukino.

Carnival (カーニバル, Carnival)
Voiced by: Kana Asumi

Carnival is the LRIG of Kou Satomi.

Piruluk (ピルルク, Piruluk)
Voiced by: Minami Shinoda

Piruluk is the LRIG of Kiyoi Mizushima. In Lostorage Incited WIXOSS, the Piruluk that is seen is a different version of the Piruluk from Selector Infected WIXOSS, due to being crafted from Kiyoi's memories of her time as an LRIG. However, it is also because of this that she has many of the same abilities that Kiyoi had as an LRIG. Her appearance closely resembles Kiyoi's friends Ayumi Sakaguchi and Amika Hashimoto.

=== Other characters ===
Kou Satomi (里見紅, Satomi Kou)
Voiced by: Yuichi Nakamura

Satomi is a WIXOSS bookmaker and the main antagonist. He arranges duels with those who have signed a contract with him as a way of helping Selectors find opponents within the time limit and they cannot be cancelled. He is defeated by Suzuko at the end of Incited, resulting his body possessed by Carnival.

Aya Narumi (鳴海あや, Narumi Aya)
Voiced by: Ayaka Suwa

Aya Narumi is Shou Narumi's younger sister and a former Selector who lost in the Selector Battles. After initially losing a couple of battles, she tries to ask her older brother for help. But, due to being busy with college, he ends up ignoring her and becomes blind to his younger sister's darkening situation. Aya then ends up losing all of her coins and ends up "disappearing" as a result of her LRIG taking over her body. It is because of her disappearance that Shou enters the battles in the hopes of finding her.

== WIXOSS Diva(A)Live ==
Hirana Asu (明日平和, Asu Hirana)
Voiced by: Saya Fukuzumi
Rei Sakigake (魁令, Sakigake Rei)
Voiced by: Haruka Shiraishi
Akino Onko (温故昭乃, Onko Akino)
Voiced by: Shizuku Hoshinoya
Nana Nekozawa (猫澤奈々, Nekozawa Nana)
Voiced by: Nozomi Nishida
Mimi Usakawa (兎川美々, Usakawa Mimi)
Voiced by: Yuuki Hirose
Rara Inumiya (犬宮羅々, Inumiya Rara)
Voiced by: Rena Hasegawa
Tamago Hakase (タマゴ博士, Hakase Tamago)
Voiced by: Ayumi Mano
Koeru Nobagoshi (野場越超, Nobagoshi Koeru)
Voiced by: Kotone Watanabe
Big Bang (ビッグ・バン, Biggu Ban)
Voiced by: Asami Mizukami
Mujika Yadoki (夜伽ムジカ, Yadoki Mujika)
Voiced by: Lamalfa Michelle Tateyama
Sanga Shinonome (摩訶円, Shinonome Sanga)
Voiced by: Rui Tanabe
Madoka Maka (東雲山河, Maka Madoka)
Voiced by: Sayumi Watabe
Mikoto Fujishima (藤嶋美琴, Fujishima Mikoto)
Voiced by: Eri Yukimura
Maho Umedu (梅津真帆, Umedu Maho)
Voiced by: Erisa Ichihara
Yukari Yanagi (柳由香里, Yanagi Yukari)
Voiced by: Rise Moritomo
Yuki Azami (結城阿左美, Azami Yuki)
Voiced by: M.A.O
