= Rising Impact =

Japanese manga series

- First tankōbon volume cover, featuring Gawain Nanaumi

ライジングインパクト (Raijingu Inpakuto)
- Genre: Sports
- Manga
- Written by: Nakaba Suzuki
- Published by: Shueisha
- Imprint: Jump Comics
- Magazine: Weekly Shōnen Jump
- Original run: December 7, 1998 – February 19, 2002
- Volumes: 17
- Original net animation
- Directed by: Hitoshi Nanba
- Written by: Michihiro Tsuchiya
- Music by: Masaru Yokoyama
- Studio: Lay-duce
- Licensed by: Netflix
- Released: June 22, 2024 – August 6, 2024
- Runtime: 22–28 minutes
- Episodes: 26
- icon

Rising Impact (Japanese: ライジングインパクト, Hepburn: Raijingu Inpakuto) is a Japanese manga series written and illustrated by Nakaba Suzuki. It was serialized in Shueisha's shōnen manga magazine Weekly Shōnen Jump from November 1998 to February 2002, with its chapters collected in 17 tankōbon volumes.

An original net animation (ONA) series adaptation produced by Lay-duce was released in June and August 2024 on Netflix.

== Plot ==
Gawain Nanaumi, a young boy living in the rural mountains, possesses exceptional physical strength and a passion for hitting balls as far as possible, originally through baseball. His life changes when he meets Kiria Nishino, a visitor who introduces him to golf, a sport that immediately captivates him after a single shot. He recognizes his natural talent, particularly his extraordinary driving distance and keen observational skills, which were shaped by his upbringing. Kiria helps Gawain travel to Tokyo and enroll at Camelot Academy, a prestigious school for elite and aspiring golfers from around the world. There, Gawain pursues his dream of becoming the world's greatest professional golfer, confronting rival prodigies with unique abilities and facing a series of competitive trials that test his raw talent, growth, and determination.

== Characters ==
Gawain Nanaumi (七海 ガウェイン, Nanaumi Gawein)
Voiced by: Misaki Kuno (Japanese); Debi Derryberry (English)
A young third grader who is honest, hard working, and optimistic. He helps his grandpa by chopping trees into firewood, helping him build the balance and lower body strength needed to play golf.
Lancelot Norman (ランスロット・ノーマン, Ransurotto Nōman)
Voiced by: Yumiri Hanamori (Japanese); Kieran Regan (English)
Kiria Nishino (西野 霧亜, Nishino Kiria)
Voiced by: Yō Taichi (Japanese); Abby Trott (English)
Kurumi Nishino (西野 胡桃, Nishino Kurumi)
Voiced by: Atsumi Tanezaki (Japanese); Colleen O'Shaughnessey (English)
Yumiko Koizumi (小泉 祐美子, Koizumi Yumiko)
Voiced by: Kaede Hondo (Japanese); Julie Nathanson (English)
Liebel Ringvald (リーベル・リングヴォルド, Rīberu Ringuvorudo)
Voiced by: Yūto Uemura (Japanese); Chris Hackney (English)
Platalissa Bonaire (プラタリッサ・ボネール, Puratarissa Bonēru)
Voiced by: Yumi Uchiyama (Japanese); Erin Yvette (English)
Wanglian Li (李 王煉, Ri Ōren)
Voiced by: Eiji Takamoto (Japanese); Michael Yurchak (English)
Riser Hopkins (ライザー・ホプキンス, Raizā Hopukinsu)
Voiced by: Shunsuke Takeuchi (Japanese); Nicolas Roye (English)
Kai Todoin (東堂院 戒, Tōdōin Kai)
Voiced by: Katsuyuki Konishi (Japanese); Kyle McCarley (English)
Quester Phoenix (クエスター, Kuesutā)
Voiced by: Yuki Kaji (Japanese); Ben Diskin (English)
Mika Kuromine (黒峰 美花, Kuromine Mika)
Voiced by: Akane Matsui (Japanese); Erika Harlacher (English)
Hershey Epor (ハーシィ・エポア, Hāshī Epoa)
Voiced by: Hana Satō (Japanese); Anne Yatco (English)
Daichi Arai (荒井 大地, Arai Daichi)
Voiced by: Tetsu Inada (Japanese); Mick Lauer (English)
Hidemi Kanazono (金園 秀美, Kanazono Hidemi)
Voiced by: Yukitoshi Tokumoto (Japanese); Landon McDonald (English)
Aria Sayfort (アリア・セイフォート, Aria Seifōto)
Voiced by: Sayaka Ohara (Japanese); Courtenay Taylor (English)

== Media ==
=== Manga ===
Written and illustrated by Nakaba Suzuki, Rising Impact was serialized in Shueisha's shōnen manga magazine Weekly Shōnen Jump from December 7, 1998, (Note: It debuted in the magazine's 52nd issue of 1998 (cover date December 7), released on December 7 of that same year.) to February 19, 2002. (Note: It was published until the magazine's 12th issue of 2002 (cover date March 4), released on February 19 of that same year.) Shueisha collected its chapters in 17 tankōbon volumes, released from April 30, 1999, to August 2, 2002. Shueisha started publishing a shinsōban edition on May 2, 2024.

==== Volumes ====
| No. | Release date | ISBN |
|---|---|---|
| 1 | April 30, 1999 | 978-4-08-872716-5 |
| 2 | June 3, 1999 | 978-4-08-872731-8 |
| 3 | December 2, 1999 | 978-4-08-872804-9 |
| 4 | February 2, 2000 | 978-4-08-872827-8 |
| 5 | April 4, 2000 | 978-4-08-872850-6 |
| 6 | June 2, 2000 | 978-4-08-872874-2 |
| 7 | August 4, 2000 | 978-4-08-872895-7 |
| 8 | October 4, 2000 | 978-4-08-873023-3 |
| 9 | December 4, 2000 | 978-4-08-873048-6 |
| 10 | March 2, 2001 | 978-4-08-873088-2 |
| 11 | May 1, 2001 | 978-4-08-873111-7 |
| 12 | August 3, 2001 | 978-4-08-873145-2 |
| 13 | October 4, 2001 | 978-4-08-873171-1 |
| 14 | February 1, 2002 | 978-4-08-873221-3 |
| 15 | April 4, 2002 | 978-4-08-873251-0 |
| 16 | June 4, 2002 | 978-4-08-873273-2 |
| 17 | August 2, 2002 | 978-4-08-873296-1 |

==== New edition ====
| No. | Release date | ISBN |
|---|---|---|
| 1 | May 2, 2024 | 978-4-08-792610-1 |
| 2 | May 2, 2024 | 978-4-08-792611-8 |
| 3 | June 4, 2024 | 978-4-08-792612-5 |
| 4 | June 4, 2024 | 978-4-08-792613-2 |
| 5 | July 4, 2024 | 978-4-08-792614-9 |
| 6 | July 4, 2024 | 978-4-08-792615-6 |
| 7 | August 2, 2024 | 978-4-08-792616-3 |
| 8 | August 2, 2024 | 978-4-08-792617-0 |

=== Anime ===
An original net animation series adaptation was announced on December 8, 2023. The series is produced by Lay-duce and directed by Hitoshi Nanba, with Michihiro Tsuchiya writing the scripts, Kiyotaka Oshiyama designing the characters, and Masaru Yokoyama composing the music. The series' first and second seasons premiered on Netflix on June 22 and August 6, 2024, respectively.

=== Season 1 (2024) ===
| No. overall | No. in season | Title | Original release date |
|---|---|---|---|
| 1 | 1 | "Encountering a Dream"; Transliteration: "Yume to no deai" (Japanese: 夢との出会い) | June 22, 2024 |
| 2 | 2 | "The Importance of Each Stroke"; Transliteration: "Sorezore no sutorōku no jūyō-sei" (Japanese: それぞれのストロークの重要性) | June 22, 2024 |
| 3 | 3 | "Twin Peaks of Talent"; Transliteration: "Sainō no tsuin pīkusu" (Japanese: 才能のツイン・ピークス) | June 22, 2024 |
| 4 | 4 | "First Tournament"; Transliteration: "Saisho no tōnamento" (Japanese: 最初のトーナメント) | June 22, 2024 |
| 5 | 5 | "Camelot Academy"; Transliteration: "Kyamerottoakademī" (Japanese: キャメロットアカデミー) | June 22, 2024 |
| 6 | 6 | "Uncrowned Prince"; Transliteration: "Mukan no ōji" (Japanese: 無冠の王子) | June 22, 2024 |
| 7 | 7 | "An Explosive Situation"; Transliteration: "Bakuhatsu-tekina jōkyō" (Japanese: 爆発的な状況) | June 22, 2024 |
| 8 | 8 | "The Tryouts Begin"; Transliteration: "Toraiauto ga hajimarimasu" (Japanese: トライアウトが始まります) | June 22, 2024 |
| 9 | 9 | "Stubbornness and Pride"; Transliteration: "Ganko-sa to puraido" (Japanese: 頑固さとプライド) | June 22, 2024 |
| 10 | 10 | "Playoffs"; Transliteration: "Purēofu" (Japanese: プレーオフ) | June 22, 2024 |
| 11 | 11 | "A Venerable Visitor"; Transliteration: "Tōtoi hōmon-sha" (Japanese: 尊い訪問者) | June 22, 2024 |
| 12 | 12 | "To the Battlefield!"; Transliteration: "Senjō e!" (Japanese: 戦場へ！) | June 22, 2024 |

=== Season 2 (2024) ===
| No. overall | No. in season | Title | Original release date |
|---|---|---|---|
| 13 | 1 | "Worthy New Opponents"; Transliteration: "Fusawashī aratana taisen aite" (Japanese: ふさわしい新たな対戦相手) | August 6, 2024 |
| 14 | 2 | "The Door to One's Soul"; Transliteration: "Tamashī no tobira" (Japanese: 魂の扉) | August 6, 2024 |
| 15 | 3 | "Camelot Cup Competition!"; Transliteration: "Kyamerottokappu sōdatsu-sen!" (Japanese: キャメロットカップ争奪戦！) | August 6, 2024 |
| 16 | 4 | "An Awakened Power"; Transliteration: "Mezameta chikara" (Japanese: 目覚めた力) | August 6, 2024 |
| 17 | 5 | "The Brits Go Into Overdrive"; Transliteration: "Igirisu hito ga ōbādoraibu ni totsunyū" (Japanese: 英国人がオーバードライブに突入) | August 6, 2024 |
| 18 | 6 | "The Way To Victory"; Transliteration: "Shōri e no michi" (Japanese: 勝利への道) | August 6, 2024 |
| 19 | 7 | "The Dark Nobleman"; Transliteration: "Yami no kizoku" (Japanese: 闇の貴族) | August 6, 2024 |
| 20 | 8 | "Monsters"; Transliteration: "Monsutā" (Japanese: モンスター) | August 6, 2024 |
| 21 | 9 | "An Approaching Destiny"; Transliteration: "Chikadzuku unmei" (Japanese: 近づく運命) | August 6, 2024 |
| 22 | 10 | "Heart of Glass"; Transliteration: "Garasu no hāto" (Japanese: ガラスのハート) | August 6, 2024 |
| 23 | 11 | "Awaken!"; Transliteration: "Mezameyo!" (Japanese: 目覚めよ！) | August 6, 2024 |
| 24 | 12 | "A Contest of Gift"; Transliteration: "Gifutokontesuto" (Japanese: ギフトコンテスト) | August 6, 2024 |
| 25 | 13 | "To the Top"; Transliteration: "Toppu e" (Japanese: トップへ) | August 6, 2024 |
| 26 | 14 | "See You Again!"; Transliteration: "Mata aimashō!" (Japanese: また会いましょう!) | August 6, 2024 |
