= The Seven Deadly Sins: Cursed by Light =

2021 film by Takayuki Hamana

- Theatrical release poster
- Kanji: 劇場版 七つの大罪 光に呪われし者たち
- Revised Hepburn: Gekijō-ban Nanatsu no Taizai Hikari ni Norowareshi Mono-tachi
- Directed by: Takayuki Hamana
- Screenplay by: Rintarō Ikeda
- Story by: Nakaba Suzuki
- Based on: The Seven Deadly Sins by Nakaba Suzuki
- Starring: Yūki Kaji; Sora Amamiya; Misaki Kuno; Aoi Yūki; Tatsuhisa Suzuki; Jun Fukuyama; Yūhei Takagi; Maaya Sakamoto; Tomokazu Sugita
- Cinematography: Shinyo Kondo
- Edited by: Keiko Onodera
- Music by: Kohta Yamamoto; Hiroyuki Sawano
- Production company: Studio Deen
- Distributed by: Toei Company
- Release date: July 2, 2021
- Running time: 79 minutes
- Country: Japan
- Language: Japanese

The Seven Deadly Sins: Cursed by Light (Japanese: 劇場版 七つの大罪 光に呪われし者たち, Hepburn: Gekijō-ban Nanatsu no Taizai Hikari ni Norowareshi Mono-tachi) is a 2021 Japanese animated fantasy action film based on The Seven Deadly Sins manga series written and illustrated by Nakaba Suzuki, and the second film for the series, following Prisoners of the Sky (2018). The film is directed by Takayuki Hamana, written by Rintarō Ikeda, and produced by Studio Deen. The film was released in Japan on July 2, 2021, followed by its Netflix streaming debut on October 1.

The film takes place exactly halfway through the last episode of the fourth season and covers the manga's last chapter.

== Plot ==
Six months have passed since the Seven Deadly Sins disbanded after defeating the Demon King and Cath Palug, the previous battle won at the cost of their comrade Escanor. Having left Liones with Elizabeth to visit the places she lived at in her previous lives before their coronation, Meliodas encounters his younger brother Zeldris and his beloved Gelda as they were on a similar journey before returning to the Demon Realm. The brothers then encounter a fatally wounded demon who reveals the Demon World was taken over by a fairy and a giant, the culprits revealed to be the missing Second Fairy King Dahlia and the "Giant Master Craftsman" Dubs who overpower the brothers before capturing Meliodas and Elizabeth.

Meanwhile, King and Diane have their wedding in the Fairy King's Forest with Ban and Gowther present while King Bartra holds a ceremony in Liones to celebrate Meliodas and Elizabeth's return. But both events are attacked by an army of fairies and giants seeking to punish the Seven Deadly Sins and their allies for ruining the Holy War. The Sins manage to defeat the army by disarming them of the weapons Dubs crafted to maintain Dalhia's enchantment on them. Back in the Demon World, Zeldris manages to convince his kinsmen to help him free Meliodas and Elizabeth, and the brothers swap opponents in order to defeat Dahlia and Dubs. But the duo were revealed to be under another's enchantment.

Back in Liones, Mael arrives to warn everyone of an attack by the revived Goddess Race under direct orders from the Supreme Deity herself. Having observed the Sins' actions through Elizabeth's eyes, the Supreme Deity commends the Sins for defeating the Demon King, yet she intends to destroy them for ending the Holy War by any means. The Supreme Deity overpowers the group before Meliodas and Zeldris arrive with Elizabeth attempting to convince her mother to leave, only to be confused when the Supreme Deity explains the conflict between the Demon and Goddess Clans is needed to maintain balance in the world. Meliodas reveals that his time being possessed by Demon King allowed him to view his father's memories, revealing the two gods were created to battle one another, treating the Holy War as merely an amusing game to them. The Supreme Deity says that an inferior being cannot have an opinion on a god's will while intending to begin a new Holy War, only to be destroyed by Meliodas and Zeldris despite warning them that her death would issue an era of chaos. After he and Elizabeth's wedding and coronation, with Hawk and Wild in attendance, Meliodas has a drink with Zeldris, who allows him to freely come and go from the Demon World, finally rekindling their brotherhood.

Meanwhile, having slaughtered a faction of Dalhia and Dubs's mind controlled minions while rebuilding his kingdom, Arthur is approached by Merlin, who informs him of the Supreme Deity's demise and that the Age of Humans and Chaos can truly begin.

== Voice cast ==
| Character | Japanese voice actor | English voice actor |
|---|---|---|
| Meliodas | Yuki Kaji | Bryce Papenbrook |
| Elizabeth Liones | Sora Amamiya | Erika Harlacher |
| Hawk | Misaki Kuno | Cristina Vee |
| Diane | Aoi Yūki | Erica Mendez |
| Ban | Tatsuhisa Suzuki | Benjamin Diskin |
| King | Jun Fukuyama | Max Mittelman |
| Gowther | Yuhei Takagi | Erik Scott Kimerer |
| Merlin | Maaya Sakamoto | Lauren Landa |
| Escanor | Tomokazu Sugita | Kyle Hebert |
| Zeldris | Yuki Kaji | Bryce Papenbrook |
| Gelda | Yuko Kaida | Amber Lee Connors |
| Wild | Mamoru Miyano | Mike McFarland |
| Mael | Hiroki Tōchi | David Vincent |
| Dahlia | Yūichi Nakamura | Matthew David Rudd |
| Dubs | Shin'ichirō Kamio | Daman Mills |
| Supreme Deity | Kana Kurashina | Rebeka Thomas |

== Production ==
Takayuki Hamana is directing the film at Studio Deen, with Rintarō Ikeda writing the film's scripts. Kohta Yamamoto and Hiroyuki Sawano are composing the music. The theme song for the film is "Sono Saki no Hikari e" by Akihito Okano.

== Release ==
The second film was released theatrically in Japan on July 2, 2021. Netflix streamed the film on its platform on October 1, 2021.

== Reception ==
=== Box office ===
The Seven Deadly Sins: Cursed By Light earned 122 million yen (about US$1.10 million) and ranked at #3 in its opening weekend. The film sold 98,000 tickets in its first three days (including Friday) and dropped from #3 to #10 in its second weekend.
