= Four Knights of the Apocalypse =

Japanese manga series by Nakaba Suzuki

- First tankōbon volume cover, featuring Percival (right) and Sin the Fox (left)

黙示録の四騎士 (Mokushiroku no Yonkishi)
- Genre: Adventure; Fantasy
- Manga
- Written by: Nakaba Suzuki
- Published by: Kodansha
- English publisher: NA: Kodansha USA
- Imprint: Shōnen Magazine Comics
- Magazine: Weekly Shōnen Magazine
- Original run: January 27, 2021 – present
- Volumes: 29
- Anime television series
- Directed by: Maki Odaira
- Written by: Shigeru Murakoshi
- Music by: Kohta Yamamoto
- Studio: Telecom Animation Film (animation); TMS Entertainment (production and planning) (Note: Under "Unlimited Produce by TMS" brand.)
- Licensed by: Netflix (streaming)
- Original network: JNN (TBS)
- Original run: October 8, 2023 – December 29, 2024
- Episodes: 36
- icon

Four Knights of the Apocalypse (Japanese: 黙示録の四騎士, Hepburn: Mokushiroku no Yonkishi), also known as The Seven Deadly Sins: Four Knights of the Apocalypse, is a Japanese manga series written and illustrated by Nakaba Suzuki. It is a sequel to Suzuki's previous series, The Seven Deadly Sins. The manga has been serialized in Kodansha's Weekly Shōnen Magazine since January 2021, with its chapters collected into 29 tankōbon volumes as of November 2026. The manga is licensed for an English release in North America by Kodansha USA.

An anime television series adaptation, produced by TMS Entertainment and animated by Telecom Animation Film, aired from October 2023 to March 2024. A second season aired from October to December 2024.

== Premise ==
Set sixteen years after the destruction of the Demon King and Supreme Deity, at the hands of the Seven Deadly Sins, wrought the end of the Holy War, the series focuses on the young boy Percival, who discovers that he is destined to be part of a group of four knights prophesied to destroy the world. Targeted by the forces of Camelot as a result, Percival travels to meet with the other three members of the Four Knights alongside Lancelot, a Liones knight who is the son of the Seven Sins member Ban.

== Production ==
=== Development ===
Following the conclusion of The Seven Deadly Sins on March 25, 2020, it was announced by the manga's author, Nakaba Suzuki, that his next work would serve as a sequel to the series. Suzuki also revealed that the new series was tentatively titled The Four Knights of the Apocalypse.

=== Characters ===
While planning the storyline for the manga, Suzuki originally desired to use the character of Tristan—who was introduced at the end of The Seven Deadly Sins as the son of Meliodas and Elizabeth Liones—to be the protagonist of Four Knights of the Apocalypse. However, Suzuki eventually changed his mind, not wanting to have a main character so closely related to the cast of his previous series. Instead, he decided to have Percival, a character created specifically for the sequel, as the protagonist. During an interview in April 2021, Suzuki commented that, in regards to Percival's design, he particularly focuses on the cuteness of the character when drawing him, adding elements that are able to highlight this in Percival, such as his helmet and cloak.

== Media ==
=== Manga ===
Written and illustrated by Nakaba Suzuki, the manga was announced in November 2020. The series began its serialization in Kodansha's shōnen manga magazine Weekly Shōnen Magazine on January 27, 2021. Kodansha has collected its chapters into individual tankōbon volumes. The first volume was released on April 16, 2021. As of November 17, 2026, 29 volumes have been released.

North American publisher Kodansha USA has licensed the series for simulpublication in North America as it is released in Japan. With the first five chapters of the series already available when it started to be published on February 23, 2021, on multiple digital platforms, including Crunchyroll Manga, BookWalker, ComiXology and Amazon Kindle, with a chapter of the manga translated into English being released weekly. The series is available in English worldwide (except Japan) on the digital manga service Azuki, which was launched on June 28, 2021. Kodansha USA started releasing the volumes in print on January 25, 2022.

==== Volumes ====
No.	Original release date	Original ISBN	English release date	English ISBN
1	April 16, 2021	978-4-06-522982-8	January 25, 2022	978-1-64651-452-6
1. "The Boy's Departure" (少年は旅立つ, Shōnen wa Tabidatsu); 2. "Chance Encounters" (邂逅, Kaikō); 3. "On Father's Trail" (父の手掛かり, Chichi no Tegakari); 4. "The Unknown Force" (未知なる力, Michinaru Chikara); 5. "The Four Knights of the Apocalypse" (〈黙示録の四騎士〉, Mokushiroku no Yonkishi)
A youth named Percival lives with his grandfather Varghese atop an island above the clouds known as God's Finger. On Percival's 16th birthday, Varghese is fatally wounded by a knight in red armor who seeks to prevent the coming of four prophesied individuals known as the Four Knights of the Apocalypse. Before dying, Varghese reveals his killer to be Percival's father, Ironside, a Holy Knight from Camelot. Climbing down God's Finger for answers, Percival acquires traveling companions in the mysterious fox Sin and a street performer named Donny.
2	June 17, 2021	978-4-06-523579-9	March 15, 2022	978-1-64651-454-0
6. "The Next Destination" (目指すべき場所, Mezasubeki Basho); 7. "The Demon of Echo Gorge" (木霊の谷の悪魔, Kodama no Tani no Akuma); 8. "Percival the Guinea Pig" (パーシバル､実験台(モルモット)になる, Pāshibaru, Morumotto ni naru); 9. "Venom-Mixing Boy" (調毒少年, Chōdoku Shōnen); 10. "Trampling Upon Their Hearts" (心踏みにじりし者, Kokoro Fuminijirishi Mono); 11. "Percival's Rage" (パーシバルの怒り, Pāshibaru no Ikari); 12. "It's Showtime!!"; 13. "A Resolve Further Honed" (さらなる決意, Saranaru Ketsui); 14. "The Lonely Young Lady" (孤独の令嬢, Kodoku no Reijō)
3	September 17, 2021	978-4-06-524838-6	May 24, 2022	978-1-64651-455-7
15. "Anghalhad and Her Dream" (夢見るアングハルハッド, Yumemiru Anguharuhaddo); 16. "Sistana Shaken" (戦慄のシスタナ, Senritsu no Shisutana); 17. "Confrontation with Evil" (悪との対峙, Aku to no Taiji); 18. "Resolve for the Battle" (戦いへの覚悟, Tatakai e no Kakugo); 19. "An Act of Evil" (悪の所業, Aku no Shogyō); 20. "The Name of the Magic" (その魔力の名は, Sono Maryoku no Na wa); 21. "Hope" (希望(ホープ), Hōpu); 22. "Young Heroes" (幼き勇者たち, Osanaki Yūsha-tachi); 23. "Arthur Pendragon" (アーサー・ペンドラゴン, Āsā Pendoragon)
4	November 17, 2021	978-4-06-525999-3	July 12, 2022	978-1-64651-604-9
24. "Who's the Leader?" (リーダーは誰だ!?, Rīdā wa Dare da!?); 25. "A Thrilling Day in Cant" (わくわくカント探訪, Wakuwaku Kanto Tanbō); 26. "Uncle and Nephew" (叔父と甥, Oji to Oi); 27. "Master and Pupil" (師と弟子, Shi to Deshi); 28. "Roar of Destruction" (破滅の咆哮, Hametsu no Hōkō); 29. "A Boy's Resolve" (少年の決意, Shōnen no Ketsui); 30. "Raging Storms" (吹き荒ぶ嵐, Fukisusabu Arashi); 31. "A Real Holy Knight" (本物の聖騎士, Honmono no Seikishi); 32. "The Peaks of Fear" (おそろしの山, Osoroshi no Yama)
5	January 17, 2022	978-4-06-526601-4	October 11, 2022	978-1-64651-605-6
33. "The Evil Feast" (魔宴, Maen); 34. "True Natures Exposed" (さらけ出された本性, Sarakedasareta Honshō); 35. "A Sinister Endeavor" (邪悪なる試み, Jaaku naru Kokoromi); 36. "Cernunnos, the Mystic Beast" (幻獣ケルヌンノス, Genjū Kerununnosu); 37. "The Cornered" (追いつめられる者, Oitsumerareru-mono); 38. "The Rescue" (救済, Kyūsai); 39. "The Goat Sin" (ゴート・シン, Gōto Shin); 40. "Fearsome Attackers" (恐るべき襲撃者たち, Osorubeki Shūgekisha-tachi); 41. "Fissures" (亀裂, Kiretsu)
6	March 17, 2022	978-4-06-527286-2	November 15, 2022	978-1-64651-606-3
42. "The Dark Talismans" (闇のタリスマン, Yami no Tarisuman); 43. "The Intense Battle Unfolds" (激闘のはじまり, Gekitō no Hajimari); 44. "The Lost Children" (追い詰められた子羊たち, Oitsumerareta Kohitsuji-tachi); 45. "The Chivalric Code" (助言, Jogen); 46. "The Realization" (気づき, Kizuki); 47. "Final Blow of Desperation" (追い討ちする絶望, Oiuchi-suru Zetsubō); 48. "Departing from Sin" (シンとの別れ, Shin to no Wakare); 49. "Lancelot" (ランスロット, Ransurotto); 50. "Bewilderment" (とまどい, Tomadoi)
7	May 17, 2022	978-4-06-527911-3	February 28, 2023	978-1-64651-728-2
51. "The King of Liones" (リオネス王, Rionesu-ō); 52. "Meliodas and Percival" (メリオダスとパーシバル, Meriodasu to Pāshibaru); 53. "Triple Trouble" (トリプルトラブル, Toripuru Toraburu); 54. "Trickery" (奸計, Kankei); 55. "Tristan" (トリスタン, Torisutan); 56. "Knights of Prophecy Meet" (予言の騎士の邂逅, Yogen no Kishi no Kaikō); 57. "Liones in Panic" (リオネス・パニック, Rionesu Panikku); 58. "Creeping Omens" (忍び寄る不吉, Shinobi yoru Fukitsu); 59. "Led by the Nose" (手玉に取られる男, Tedama ni Torareru Otoko)
8	August 17, 2022	978-4-06-528656-2	May 16, 2023	978-1-64651-729-9
60. "Liones in Flames" (灼熱のリオネス, Shakunetsu no Rionesu); 61. "The Fourth Arrives" (四人目現る, Yonninme Arawaru); 62. "The Start of a New Legend" (新たなる伝説の始まり, Aratanaru Densetsu no Hajimari); 63. "Taming a Wild Horse" (じゃじゃ馬ならし, Jaja Uma Narashi); 64. "Those Seeking Revenge" (復讐者たち, Fukushūsha-tachi); 65. "The Nightmare Anew" (悪夢は再び, Akumu wa Futatabi); 66. "The Assessment" (品定め, Shinasadame); 67. "The Four Knights vs. the Servants of Chaos" (〈黙示録の四騎士〉 vs. 混沌の使徒, Mokushiroku no Yonkishi vs. Konton no Shito); 68. "The Nephilim" (ネフィリム, Nefirimu)
9	November 17, 2022	978-4-06-529487-1	August 15, 2023	978-1-64651-910-1
69. "Secret Maneuvers" (暗躍する者, Anyakusuru Mono); 70. "The Blade of Treason" (裏切りの刃, Uragiri no Yaiba); 71. "A Friend's Transformation" (友の変貌, Tomo no Henbō); 72. "Freezing, Burning Hearts" (凍てつき燃ゆる心, Itetsuki Moyuru Kokoro); 73. "The Demon Melagaland" (悪魔のメラガラン, Akuma no Meragaran); 74. "Frantic Resistance" (必死の抵抗, Hisshi no Teikō); 75. "Royal Holy Knights vs. Mela-Galland" (王国聖騎士 vs. メラガラン, Ōkoku Seikishi vs. Meragaran); 76. "Advent" (降臨, Kōrin); 77. "The Power of the King" (王の威光, Ō no Ikō)
10	January 17, 2023	978-4-06-529938-8	November 7, 2023	978-1-64651-911-8
78. "A King's Pride" (王の矜持(プライド), Ō no Puraido); 79. "Hyperion" (ハイペリオン, Haiperion); 80. "King Arthur vs. Lancelot" (アーサー王 vs. ランスロット, Āsā-ō vs. Ransurotto); 81. "After the Brawl..." (激闘終わって..., Gekitō Owatte...); 82. "Their Respective Conflicts" (それぞれの葛藤, Sorezore no Kattō); 83. "Prepared to Part Ways" (別れの決意, Wakare no Ketsui); 84. "Transition of an Era" (パーシバル隊結成!!, Pāshibaru-tai Kessei!!); 85. "The Gloom" (暗鬱, An'utsu); 86. "Buddings" (芽生え, Mebae)
11	March 16, 2023	978-4-06-530933-9	February 13, 2024	979-8-88877-072-6
87. "Guinevere" (ギネヴィア, Ginevia); 88. "Departure"; 89. "The Four Knights Set Off!" (四騎士始動!!, Yonkishi Shidō!!); 90. "The Bride's Greeting" (花嫁の出迎え, Hanayome no Demukae); 91. "Confrontation" (対峙, Taiji); 92. "The Great Wolnack Search" (どきどきウォルナック探訪, Dokidoki Worunakku Tanbō); 93. "Madrigal of Youth" (青春マドリガル, Seishun Madorigaru); 94. "Occurrence on the Night of Prayer" (祈りの夜の出来事, Inori no Yoru no Dekigoto); 95. "Assassin in the Dark Night" (闇夜の刺客, Yamiyo no Shikaku)
12	June 15, 2023	978-4-06-531567-5	May 7, 2024	979-8-88877-073-3
96. "City of Battle" (壁の街の戦い, Kabe no Machi no Tatakai); 97. "Counterattack" (反撃, Hangeki); 98. "Requiem of Silence" (静寂の鎮魂歌(レクイエム), Seijaku no Rekuiemu); 99. "Unable to Be Said" (言えなかった言葉, Ienakatta Kotoba); 100. "Flames of Reminiscence" (追想の炎, Tsuisō no Honō); 101. "Shredded Hearts" (軋むココロ, Kishimu Kokoro); 102. "The Crazed King" (狂王, Kyō-ō); 103. "To the Demon Realm" (いざ魔界へ, Iza Makai e); 104. "Intrusion into Demonity" (魔界への侵入, Makai e no Shinnyū)
13	August 17, 2023	978-4-06-532614-5	August 13, 2024	979-8-88877-206-5
105. "A Demonic Welcome" (魔界の歓迎, Makai no Kangei); 106. "Savior" (救い主様, Sukuinushi-sama); 107. "The Wild Child's Solitude" (じゃじゃ馬の孤独, Jaja Uma no Kodoku); 108. "Calamity Behemoth" (災いのベヒモス, Wazawai no Behimosu); 109. "A Trying Week" (試される一週間, Tamasareru Isshūkan); 110. "In Pursuit of Strength" (強さを求めて, Tsuyosa o Motomete); 111. "Me Today Over Me Yesterday" (昨日の自分より 今日の自分より, Kinō no Jibun yori, Kyō no Jibun yori); 112. "Wavering Hearts" (揺れるココロ, Yureru Kokoro); 113. "Zarura N'Du" (ツァルラ・ンドゥ, Tsarura Ndu)
14	October 17, 2023	978-4-06-533154-5	November 5, 2024	979-8-88877-307-9
114. "The Mission Begins" (任務開始, Ninmu Kaishi); 115. "The Battle of the Albion" (アルビオン攻防戦, Arubion Kōbōsen); 116. "The Boy of Destiny" (宿命の少年, Shukumei no Shōnen); 117. "Vaz Zigra" (ヴァズ・ジグラ, Vazu Jigura); 118. "The Battle Trigger" (開戦の火蓋, Kaisen no Hibuta); 119. "Clash! Clash! Clash!" (激突!! 激突!! 激突!!, Gekitotsu!! Gekitotsu!! Gekitotsu!!); 120. "Banquet for Braves" (強者たちの宴, Tsuwamono-tachi no Utage); 121. "If Not You, Then Who?" (キミがやらずに誰がやる, Kimi ga Yarazu ni Dare ga Yaru); 122. "The Washouts" (できそこない, Dekisokonai)
15	January 17, 2024	978-4-06-534182-7	February 4, 2025	979-8-88877-308-6
123. "Resolve" (不退転, Futaiten); 124. "Realm of a Master" (達人領域, Tatsujin Ryōiki); 125. "Knights of 'War'" (〈戦争〉の騎士, Sensō no Kishi); 126. "Prayer" (祈り, Inori); 127. "The Day You Were Born" (キミが生まれた日, Kimi ga Umareta Hi); 128. "The Day You Went Away" (キミが消えた日, Kimi ga Kieta Hi); 129. "Invasion" (侵攻, Shinkō); 130. "The Fox Sin of Greed" (フォックス・シン, Fokkusu Shin); 131. "In Search of Hope" (希望を探して, Kibō o Sagashite)
16	April 17, 2024	978-4-06-535177-2	April 1, 2025	979-8-88877-396-3
132. "The Resisters" (抗う者たち, Aragau Mono-tachi); 133. "Hewn in Two" (両断, Ryōdan); 134. "The Stranger" (ストレンジャー, Sutorenjā); 135. "The Conversation" (対話, Taiwa); 136. "The Advancing Dragnet" (迫る包囲網, Semaru Hōimō); 137. "Forest of Sloth and Envy" (怠惰と嫉妬の森, Taida to Shitto no Mori); 138. "Nasiens in the Fairy King's Forest" (妖精王の森のナシエンス, Yōsei-ō no Mori no Nashiensu); 139. "Unseen Pain" (見えざる苦しみ, Miezaru Kurushimi); 140. "The Shape of Truth" (真実の姿, Shinjitsu no Sugata)
17	June 17, 2024	978-4-06-535783-5	June 10, 2025	979-8-88877-461-8
141. "The Drug of Yore" (いにしえの秘薬, Inishie no Hiyaku); 142. "A Sad Crossing" (悲しきすれ違い, Kanashiki Surechigai); 143. "Tragedy" (悲劇, Higeki); 144. "Cracks" (亀裂, Kiretsu); 145. "Family Battle" (家族の戦い, Kazoku no Tatakai); 146. "Love Melts Curses Like Ice" (愛は氷の如く呪いを溶かす, Ai wa Kōri no Gotoku Noroi o Tokasu); 147. "The Difference in Power" (実力差, Jitsuryoku-sa); 148. "Dark Clouds Looming" (たれこめる暗雲, Tarekomeru An'un); 149. "Overwhelmed" (蹂躙, Jūrin)
18	September 17, 2024	978-4-06-536519-9	August 26, 2025	979-8-88877-537-0
150. "Hope of a New Generation" (次代の希望, Jidai no Kibō); 151. "Not at All a Tragedy" (それは決して悲劇ではない, Sore wa Kesshite Higeki de wa Nai); 152. "The Return" (復活, Fukkatsu); 153. "Toward New Adventure" (新たなる冒険へ, Aratanaru Bōken e); 154. "The Parting" (決別, Ketsubetsu); 155. "Back Together" (再結成, Sai Kessei); 156. "In Search of Friends" (仲間を求めて, Nakama o Motomete); 157. "Lives Pulled Together" (引き合う命, Hikiau Inochi); 158. "I Can't Drop the Attitude..." (素直になれなくて, Sunao ni Narenakute)
19	November 15, 2024	978-4-06-537435-1	October 28, 2025	979-8-88877-562-2
159. "Aboard the Ship Sailing a Sea of Clouds" (雲海の船にて, Unkai no Fune nite); 160. "Dubby the Chef" (料理人ダブッち, Ryōrinin Dabucchi); 161. "A Strange Reunion" (奇妙な再会, Kimyōna Saikai); 162. "Those Who Yearn" (渇望する者たち, Katsubō suru Mono-tachi); 163. "Whirling Amid the Uproar" (狂宴に舞う, Kyō Utage ni Mau); 164. "And the Last Still Stading Are..." (勝ち残るのは..., Kachinokoru no wa...); 165. "Reminiscing While Reuniting" (追憶との再会, Tsuioku to no Saikai); 166. "A Gentle Night" (優しい夜, Yasashii Yoru); 167. "Percival VS. Gareth" (パーシバルvs.ガレス, Pāshibaru vs. Garesu)
20	February 17, 2025	978-4-06-538418-3	December 30, 2025	979-8-88877-631-5
168. "The Twin Swordsmen" (双子の剣士, Futago no Kenshi); 169. "Donny VS. Mystery Package" (ドニーvs.福袋(ミステリーパッケージ), Donī vs. Misuterī Pakkēji); 170. "Anne VS. Diodora" (アンvs.ディオドラ, An vs. Diodora); 171. "Rage" (怒り, Ikari); 172. "Nasiens VS. Rothes" (ナシエンスvs.ロセス, Nashiensu vs. Rosesu); 173. "A Conversation" (対話, Taiwa); 174. "Gawain VS. Turret" (ガウェインvs.タレット, Gawein vs. Taretto); 175. "How to Take Down a Sorcerer" (術士の仕留め方, Jutsu-shi no Shitome-kata); 176. "Howzer VS. Balin" (ハウザーvs.バリン, Hauzā vs. Barin)
21	April 16, 2025	978-4-06-539096-2	March 31, 2026	979-8-88877-680-3
177. "A Battle Between Men" (漢の戦い, Kan no Tatakai); 178. "Tantris VS. Chion" (タントリスvs.キオン, Tantorisu vs. Kion); 179. "Tristan and Chion" (トリスタンとキオン, Torisutan to Kion); 180. "Pelio VS. Isolde" (ペリオvs.イゾルデ, Perio vs. Izorude); 181. "Night of Despair" (絶望の夜, Zetsubō no Yoru); 182. "A Cruel Death" (残酷なる死, Zankokunaru Shi); 183. "Unrequited Feelings" (届かぬ想い, Todokanu Omoi); 184. "Percival VS. Mystery Package" (パーシバルvs.福袋(ミステリーパッケージ), Pāshibaru vs. Misuterī Pakkēji); 185. "A Major Incident" (重大事案, Jūdai Jian)
22	July 16, 2025	978-4-06-539739-8	July 7, 2026	979-8-88877-818-0
186. "Nasiens VS. Diodora" (ナシエンスvs.ディオドラ, Nashiensu vs. Diodora); 187. "The Boy Lost to Darkness" (闇に堕ちた少年, Yami ni Ochita Shōnen); 188. "Father's Words, Mother's Memories" (父の言葉 母の記憶, Chichi no Kotoba Haha no Kioku); 189. "Gawain VS. Balin" (ガウェインvs.バリン, Gawein vs. Barin); 190. "Head-on Clash" (正面衝突, Shōmen Shōtotsu); 191. "Do-or-Die Resistance" (決死の抵抗, Kesshi no Teikō); 192. "The Rulebreaker" (反則少女, Hansoku Shōjo); 193. "For Whom?" (誰がために, Dare ga Tame ni); 194. "Tantris vs. Isolde" (タントリスvs.イゾルデ, Tantorisu vs. Izorude)
23	September 17, 2025	978-4-06-540661-8	October 6, 2026	979-8-88877-899-9
195. "Tristan and Isolde" (トリスタンとイゾルデ, Torisutan to Izorude); 196. "Despair and Hope" (絶望と希望, Zetsubō to Kibō); 197. "Grampa's Wish" (じいじの願い, Jīji no Negai); 198. "Percival VS. Diodora" (パーシバルvs.ディオドラ, Pāshibaru vs. Diodora); 199. "The Visitor" (ゲスト, Gesuto); 200. "Now or Never!" (待ったなし!!, Matta Nashi!!); 201. "Envoy from the Abyss" (奈落よりの使者, Naraku Yori no Shisha); 202. "The Truest of Evils" (真の〈四凶〉, Shin no 〈Shikyō〉); 203. "Light of the Future" (光明, Kōmyō)
24	November 17, 2025	978-4-06-541552-8	December 29, 2026	979-8-88877-973-6
204. "A Fleeting Resistance" (儚き抵抗, Hakanaki Teikō); 205. "By His Strength" (その男 最強につき, Sono Otoko Saikyō ni Tsuki); 206. "The Gloating Man" (ほくそ笑む者, Hokusoemu Mono); 207. "The Homecoming" (帰郷, Kikyō); 208. "Father and Son in Conversation" (父と子の語らい, Chantoko no Katarai); 209. "The Abduction" (神隠し, Kamigakushi); 210. "The Princess and the Boy" (湖と姫と少年, Mizūmi to Hime to Shōnen)
25	January 16, 2026	978-4-06-542205-2	—	—
211. "Lancelot, Knight of the Lake" (湖の騎士ランスロット, Mizūmi no Kishi Ransurotto); 212. "Mismatched Lovers" (ちぐはぐラバーズ, Chiguhagu Rabāzu); 213. "A Sincere Confession" (誠実なる告白, Seijitsunaru Kokuhaku); 214. "Rest and Resolve" (休息と決意, Kyūsoku to Ketsui); 215. "Parental Affection, Awkwardly Provided" (不器用な親心, Bukiyōna Oyagokoro); 216. "A Secret Revealed" (明かされる秘密, Akasa reru Himitsu); 217. "The Eternal King" (永遠の王, Eien no Ō); 218. "Marriage Red" (マリッジ・レッド, Marijji Reddo); 219. "What I Want Known" (伝えたいこと, Tsutaetai Koto)
26	April 16, 2026	978-4-06-543514-4	—	—
220. "The Signal to Rise Up" (反撃の狼煙, Hangeki no Noroshi); 221. "Anarchy in Liones" (本性, Honshō); 222. "The Seven Deadly Sins VS. The Eternal King" (〈七つの大罪〉vs.〈永遠の王〉, 〈Nanatsu no Taizai〉 vs. 〈Eien no Ō〉); 223. "What I Wish to Protect" (守りたいもの, Mamoritai Mono); 224. "Twilight for Heroes" (英雄たちは黄昏ない, Eiyū-tachi no Tasogare nai); 225. "Not What was Meant to Be" (こんなはずでは, Konna Hazude wa); 226. "Cath in Despair" (絶望のキャス, Zetsubō no Kyasu); 227. "Liones in Bedlam" (狂乱のリオネス, Kyōran no Rionesu); 228. "Perfect Time" (パーフェクトタイム, Pāfekuto Taimu)
27	July 16, 2026	978-4-06-543887-9	—	—
229. "The Love Letter"; 230. "The Pandora's Box" (禁忌の箱(パンドラボックス), Pandora Bokkusu); 231. "The Conclusion" (決着, Ketchaku); 232. "Inheritors of the Will" (意思を継ぐ者たち, Ishi o Tsugu Monotachi); 233. "The Mysterious Assassins" (謎の刺客, Nazo no Shikaku); 234. "Knights of the Grail" (聖杯の騎士, Seihai no Kishi); 235. "Visitors from Beyond" (彼方よりの訪問者, Kanatayori no Hōmonsha); 236. "Guided by Blood" (血の導き, Chi no Michibiki); 237. "The Unexpected Meeting" (邂逅, Kaigō)
28	September 16, 2026	978-4-06-544979-0	—	—
238. "The King of Resolve" (覚悟の王, Kakugo no Ō); 239. "The Blood of Atonement" (贖罪の血, Shokuzai no Chi); 240. "The Pilgrims" (巡礼者, Junreisha); 241. "The Four Knights vs. the Knights of the Holy Grail" (〈黙示録の四騎士〉vs.〈聖杯の騎士〉, 〈Mokushiroku no Yonkishi〉 vs. 〈Seihai no Kishi〉); 242. "The Predicament" (窮地, Kyūchi); 243. "Knights Perplexed" (とまどう騎士たち, Tomadō Kishitachi); 244. "The Man Who Refused to Talk" (語らぬ男, Kataranu Otoko); 245. "Trail of the Beast" (獣の行方, Kemono no Yukue); 246. "The Difference in Ability" (実力差, Jitsuryokusa)
29	November 17, 2026	978-4-06-545709-2	—	—
247. "Darkness Comes, so We May Recognize Love" (暗闇は愛に気づくために訪れる, Kurayami wa ai ni Kidzuku Tame ni Otozureru); 248. "Worst-Case Scenario" (最悪のシナリオ, Saiaku no Shinario); 249. "Prayer" (祈り, Inori); 250. "Chaos Lancelot" (カオス・ランスロット, Kaosu Ransurotto); 251. "Resistance" (抗い, Aragai); 252. "A Future to be Feared" (怖るべき未来, Kowa Rubeki Mirai); 253. "Towards Hope" (希望に向かって, Kibō ni Mukatte); 254. "Footsteps Toward Ruin" (破滅の足音, Hametsu no Ashioto); 255. "Tragedy In Demondom" (惨劇の魔界, Sangeki no Makai)

==== Chapters not yet in tankōbon format ====
These chapters have yet to be published in a tankōbon volume.

256. "Chaos Lancelot VS. Zeldris" (カオス ランスロットvs.ゼルドリス, Kaosu Ransurotto vs. Zerudorisu)
257. "Undispellable Passions" (ぬぐえぬ熱情, Nuguenu Netsujō)
258. "The Limit" (限界, Genkai)
259. "At the End of the Rampage" (暴走の果て, Bōsō no Hate)
260. "Day of the Return" (復活の日, Fukkatsu no Hi)
261. "Determination and Resolve" (覚悟と決意, Kakugo to Ketsui)

=== Anime ===
In May 2022, it was announced that the manga would receive an anime television series adaptation, titled The Seven Deadly Sins: Four Knights of the Apocalypse. Produced and planned by TMS Entertainment, and animated by Telecom Animation Film, it is directed by Maki Odaira, with scripts written by Shigeru Murakoshi, character designs handled by Youichi Takada, and music composed by Kohta Yamamoto, with the main theme composed alongside Hiroyuki Sawano. The series aired from October 8, 2023, to March 31, 2024, on TBS and its affiliates. For the first cours, the opening theme song is "Up to Me!", performed by Little Glee Monster, while the ending theme song is "Friends Are For", performed by Moonchild. For the second cours, the opening theme song is "Your Key", performed by JO1, while the ending theme song is "Mikansei" (未完成; Unfinished), performed by Zakinosuke.

Following the finale of the first season, a second season was announced, and aired from October 6 to December 29, 2024. The opening theme song is "MMH", performed by Uverworld, while the ending theme song is Akairo (アカイロ; Red), performed by Hana Hope.

Netflix acquired streaming rights to the series in October 2023, and began streaming it on January 31, 2024.

==== Episodes ====
===== Season 1 (2023–24) =====
No. overall	No. in season	Title	Directed by	Storyboarded by	Original release date
1	1	"The Boy's Departure"; Transliteration: "Shōnen wa Tabidatsu" (Japanese: 少年は旅立つ)	Maki Odaira	Maki Odaira	October 8, 2023
Percival is a boy who lives alone with his grandfather, Varghese, above the clouds on a mountaintop called God's Finger. On Percival's sixteenth birthday, a Holy Knight named Ironside arrives on a flying boat in hunt of Varghese, his former comrade whom he suspects is one of the Four Knights of the Apocalypse, a group of warriors prophesied to bring ruin to Ironside's liege, Arthur Pendragon. Ironside magically inflicts large gashes on the pair and leaves them for dead, but only Varghese is fatally wounded, while Percival mysteriously survives and heals from his injuries. Before dying, Varghese reveals Ironside to be Percival's father and urges Percival to find him, though Percival hesitates to leave until days later after finding a set of travel garments Varghese made for him. Donning Varghese's cloak and helmet, Percival climbs down God's Finger to the land of Britannia, where he encounters a red fox.
2	2	"The Unknown Force"; Transliteration: "Michinaru Chikara" (Japanese: 未知なる力)	Keiko Oyamada	Maki Odaira	October 15, 2023
Percival follows the fox out of the woods and encounters a traveling circus troupe of failed Holy Knight initiates. The troupe allows Percival to accompany them to the nearest village, which is under attack by a giant wolf. With the help of troupe member Donny, Percival easily defeats the wolf to rescue an old man and his grandson, which is observed by Pellegarde, the wolf's owner and a Holy Knight in league with Ironside. Pellegarde challenges Percival to a duel, taking an interest in training him. Percival is nearly defeated, but after he is cheered by the grandson, a magic power emanates from his hands and allows him to fight back.
3	3	"The Four Knights of the Apocalypse"; Transliteration: "Mokushiroku no Yonkishi" (Japanese: 黙示録の四騎士)	Maki Odaira	Maki Odaira	October 22, 2023
Pellegarde uses his fire magic against Percival's newly awakened power, which creates a swarm of "Mini-Percivals" that protect him and heal his injuries. Recognizing Percival's power as a form of rare Hero-type magic, Pellegarde identifies him as one of the Four Knights of the Apocalypse. Percival and Donny are rescued by the red fox, who safely teleports them several miles away from Pellegarde. The fox, Sin, explains he is tasked with escorting Percival to the kingdom of Liones, revealing that Percival is destined to destroy the world as one of the Four Knights, and that the Holy Knights pursuing them are from Camelot, a kingdom within a realm of chaos ruled by King Arthur. While hunting for food at Echo Gorge, Percival saves a fairy-like creature from a sinister young herbalist named Nasiens, who drugs Percival to use as a test subject. The local fairies warn Donny and Sin about Nasiens, whom they blame for turning the gorge's plants and wildlife into monsters.
4	4	"The Demon of Echo Gorge"; Transliteration: "Kodama no Tani no Akuma" (Japanese: 木霊の谷の悪魔)	Kim Min-Sun	Maki Odaira	October 29, 2023
Under Nasiens' captivity, Percival learns that Nasiens is developing an antidote for the poisonous miasma plaguing Echo Gorge, with the animals' mutations being an unintended side effect of his experiments. Deciding to trust Nasiens, Percival willingly drinks the untested drug despite its potentially lethal effects, proving it to be a success. After Percival convinces the fairies of Nasiens' innocence, Nasiens spreads the drug across the gorge and restores it to its original state through his magic ability, Mix Venom. However, the gorge is poisoned again by Ordo, Nasiens' long-lost mentor and adoptive grandfather, who has been transformed into a monster under the control of the fairy creature whom Nasiens imprisoned earlier. Realizing Ordo is the true source of the miasma, Percival promises to return Ordo to normal.
5	5	"A Resolve Further Honed"; Transliteration: "Sara naru Ketsui" (Japanese: さらなる決意)	Yūichirō Yano	Yūichirō Yano	November 5, 2023
The fairy creature controlling Ordo is shot by an unseen archer, revealing the creature to be a puppet of Talisker, a Holy Knight of Camelot. Percival is initially unable to use his magic, leading Nasiens to attack Talisker by himself, but regains his power after protecting Nasiens from Talisker's weather manipulation magic and gaining Nasiens' complete trust. While battling Percival, Talisker reveals he transformed Ordo on Arthur's behalf for helping the non-human races of Echo Gorge. Under Sin's guidance, Percival defeats Talisker by focusing his magic power into a sword-like form, which causes Talisker to drop the mystical Chaos Staff he used to manipulate Ordo, allowing Sin to destroy it and restore Ordo to human form. Percival resolves to stop Arthur and all of Camelot, angered by their disregard for non-humans, while Nasiens joins Percival's group to explore the world at Ordo's request. The group travels to the nearby town of Sistana, unaware that Ironside is there.
6	6	"Sistana Shaken"; Transliteration: "Senritsu no Shisutana" (Japanese: 戦慄のシスタナ)	Hideki Tokonatsu & Yūsuke Nakagama	Hiroyuki Fukushima	November 19, 2023
At Sistana, the Mini-Percivals lead Percival's group to uncover a buried piece of the Coffin of Eternal Darkness, a mystical relief once used to seal the Demon Clan away. The group is confronted by Anghalhad (Anne), the local lord's daughter and an aspiring Holy Knight, who had buried the piece to hide it from Ironside. Suspicious of them due to her magic ability to detect lies, Anne is surprised by Percival's sincerity when he returns the piece, which she instead entrusts to him for safekeeping. That evening, Ironside reveals the rest of the Coffin to the townsfolk, promising their protection from the Four Knights of the Apocalypse in exchange for its completion. Witnessing this, Sin realizes he intends to activate the Coffin by sacrificing the townsfolk. While the others rush to protect the piece, having left it at their inn room, Percival brings Anne along when she endangers herself trying to expose Ironside's deceit. However, the piece is stolen by a demonic servant of Ironside disguised as Anne's maid, allowing Ironside to complete the Coffin. Sin sends Percival's group to destroy the Coffin as Ironside begins the sacrificial ritual.
7	7	"The Name of the Magic"; Transliteration: "Sono Maryoku no Na wa" (Japanese: その魔力の名は)	Nobuo Tomizawa	Nobuo Tomizawa	November 26, 2023
Ironside's ritual summons a horde of spirits that transform Sistana's architecture into monsters. Percival attempts to break the Coffin of Eternal Darkness, but Ironside's overwhelming magic power and skill prevent him from coming close. Donny is intimidated into abandoning his friends, while Nasiens remains to help Anne defend Percival, enchanting her rapier to poison Ironside and hinder his movements. Nevertheless, Ironside strikes the group down and kills Percival, causing the Mini-Percivals to vanish and leaving his friends unable to revive him. Unaware of this, a returning Donny expresses confidence in Percival, which makes one of the Mini-Percivals reappear, renewing Nasiens and Anne's belief in Percival's survival. As his friends continue to affirm their faith in Percival, the Mini-Percivals multiply and bring him back to life. Percival credits his friends for fueling his magic, which he names "Hope".
8	8	"Young Heroes"; Transliteration: "Osanaki Yūsha-tachi" (Japanese: 幼き勇者たち)	Arika Yamato	Hisao Yokobori	December 3, 2023
Ironside's summoned monsters are slain by a young man seemingly called by Sin to protect the townspeople. Ironside admits defeat and asks for Percival's forgiveness, but Anne exposes his surrender as another attempt on Percival's life, sending Ironside into a rage. With Nasiens' poison continuing to hinder Ironside's attacks, Percival succeeds in splitting the Coffin of Eternal Darkness, while Donny uses his power of levitation to retrieve the relic's centerpiece, the Dragon Handle; Percival's attack also destroys Ironside's helmet and reveals his face, unnerving Percival with his father's resemblance to Varghese. Ironside's comrade Mortlach convinces him to return to Camelot, likening the monsters' unidentified attacker to one of the Seven Deadly Sins, the most formidable warriors in Britannia. Sin returns following the Holy Knights' retreat, lying that the attacker was a group of forest animals. Percival's group leaves Sistana afterwards, joined by Anne with her father's approval.
9	9	"Master and Pupil"; Transliteration: "Shi to Deshi" (Japanese: 師と弟子)	Yasurō Tsuchiya	Hiroyuki Fukushima	December 10, 2023
Percival's group travels to the fort town of Cant to prepare for a journey across Dalflare Range. At the town tavern, Donny encounters his maternal uncle and former mentor, Captain Howzer of Liones' Holy Knights, who is ashamed of Donny for deserting his knight training out of cowardice. In a drunken state, Howzer confiscates the Dragon Handle from Donny and berates him into running away, mistakenly accusing him and his friends of stealing the relic. Disgusted by Howzer's behavior, Nasiens challenges him to a drinking match, which Nasiens easily handles due to his immunity to alcohol. While Howzer is distracted, Nasiens deduces from the town's unusual wares and prices that the townspeople are selling stolen goods. His suspicions are proven when the townspeople intoxicate Percival and Anne into a stupor, revealing themselves to be a gang of bandits led by Edlin, another former apprentice of Howzer.
10	10	"Roar of Destruction"; Transliteration: "Hametsu no Hōkō" (Japanese: 破滅の咆哮)	Yasurō Tsuchiya	Yūichirō Yano	December 17, 2023
Howzer passes out from his drinking match, allowing Edlin to imprison him and Percival's group. The group is released by Taizoo, the town bartender, who reveals that Edlin has blackmailed an ancient dragon into following his commands by stealing its egg and creating an illusory copy of it, with the real egg having already hatched. Meanwhile, Edlin attempts to recruit Donny, summoning the dragon to coerce him when he declines. However, some of Edlin's minions expose his deception to the dragon when they accidentally destroy the fake egg during a mutiny, provoking the dragon into attacking Cant. Howzer refuses to take action, still intoxicated and bitter towards Donny and Edlin, leaving Percival and Anne to search for Donny while Nasiens tends to the dragon hatchling hidden in their cell. After Donny rescues Edlin and declares his intent to resume his training, Percival saves them both and battles the dragon, but finds his magic ineffective against it.
11	11	"A Real Holy Knight"; Transliteration: "Honmono no Seikishi" (Japanese: 本物の聖騎士)	Haruki Kasugamori	Nobuo Tomizawa	December 24, 2023
Sin rebukes Howzer for his poor treatment of Donny, revealing Donny's role in saving the Dragon Handle from Ironside, as well as Percival's identity as one of the Four Knights of the Apocalypse, which makes Howzer regret his earlier harshness. Howzer quickly defeats the dragon after being magically soberized by Nasiens, who reunites the dragon with its child, calming the dragon. Apologizing to his pupils, Howzer promises to train the repentant Edlin again and reconciles with Donny, who explains his past cowardice as a misguided attempt to live for his deceased mother's sake. Howzer offers the handle back to Donny, but Donny is too nervous to take the responsibility of carrying it. Percival accepts the handle instead, with Howzer forging it into a sword for him. Before Percival's group leaves Cant, Sin privately transforms into the young man from Sistana and fires an enchanted arrow over Liones in the distance, signalling his retrieval of Percival to Liones's king, Meliodas.
12	12	"A Sinister Endeavor"; Transliteration: "Jaaku naru Kokoromi" (Japanese: 邪悪なる試み)	Nobuo Tomizawa	Hiroyuki Fukushima	January 7, 2024
Percival's group travels through Dalflare Range, where he and Donny find a village inhabited by people with black eyes and frozen, smiling faces. The two carelessly cross a magic barrier into the village, where they are treated hospitably; following after them, Sin is put to sleep by the village elder. A local hunter, Ardd, stops Nasiens and Anne from entering the village, warning that the villagers are monsters in human disguise. Unable to cross the barrier himself, Ardd offers to help Nasiens and Anne rescue their friends. Anne determines Ardd to be trustworthy after he says his daughter, Connie, was taken by monsters as an infant. As instructed by Ardd, Anne enters the village with Nasiens and destroys its idol, which lifts the barrier and exposes the villagers' true forms as members of the Demon Clan. However, the demons remain docile and friendly, with the seemingly human elder explaining he has been protecting them from Ardd, who reveals himself as a Holy Knight of Camelot named Ardbeg.
13	13	"The Cornered"; Transliteration: "Oitsumerareru Mono" (Japanese: 追いつめられる者)	Chika Nenbe & Kamadon	Hiroyuki Fukushima	January 14, 2024
Ardbeg seals the village's demons within a magical Amber of the Four Archengels for their clan's siege on Britannia in the Holy War sixteen years earlier, despite their elder's assertion that these demons abstained from the war. Recognizing Percival as one of the Four Knights of the Apocalypse, Ardbeg turns against Anne and the others to kill him with his mystic beast familiar, Cernunnos. Sin awakens and instructs Percival to combine his magic with his sword, which multiplies the sword's power enough to sever Cernunnos's antlers. After Nasiens drugs the beast, Ardbeg retreats to the nearby Crystal Grotto, where he lures Percival's group and uses his Reverse magic to transform them into babies. Ardbeg prepares to kill Percival while the group's mental states are regressed, but tearfully falters when Anne's crying reminds him of Connie's death in a demon attack during the Holy War. As Ardbeg tries to regain his resolve, he is confronted by the elder.
14	14	"The Goat Sin"; Transliteration: "Gōto Shin" (Japanese: ゴート・シン)	Keiko Oyamada	Keiko Oyamada	January 21, 2024
The elder unveils his true identity as Gowther, one of the Seven Deadly Sins, and confiscates Ardbeg's magic amber. Ardbeg threatens to kill Percival, but stops when Gowther conjures a replica of Connie from Ardbeg's memories. Despite recognizing her as an illusion, Ardbeg is overjoyed to see his daughter again and finds closure in her death, realizing Arthur's deceit in promising to resurrect her. Observing Ardbeg's surrender through a bird familiar, the Holy Knight Tamdhu throws spears at Percival from afar. Ardbeg dies protecting Anne, which prompts Gowther to hijack Tamdhu's body and attack his teammates before Tamdhu is killed by their leader, Fiddich. After the demons are unsealed and Percival's group return to their normal ages, Gowther explains the recent events to them while lying that Ardberg left peacefully. Anne notices Gowther's lie, and is devastated when he shows her Ardbeg's memories of his life and death.
15	15	"The Dark Talismans"; Transliteration: "Yami no Tarisuman" (Japanese: 闇のタリスマン)	Kim Min-Sun	Hiroyuki Fukushima	January 28, 2024
Anne remains inconsolable over Ardbeg's death, slowing the group down as they attempt to evade Fiddich's team of assassins, the Dark Talismans. Sin angers her by destroying Ardbeg's Chaos Staff, which she brought with her as a memento, leading Anne to berate Sin for his apparent uselessness to their team. She is surprised and cheers up after Sin apologizes, unaware that he deliberately provoked her to help her out of her despair. The team continues into the Entangled Forest, where they separate the Dark Talismans to fight them individually. Nasiens helps Percival defeat the assassin Elgin, although Percival saves Elgin from falling to his death, much to Sin's disapproval. Percival flies the group further through the forest with his magic, but they are intercepted by the assassins Burgie and Doronach on their flying horse. With Sin's assistance, Anne defeats Burgie while Donny realizes his "floating" magic's true potential as telekinesis, which he uses to effortlessly hurl Doronach away.
16	16	"Departing from Sin"; Transliteration: "Shin to no Wakare" (Japanese: シンとの別れ)	Yasurō Tsuchiya	Akitaro Daichi & Hiroyuki Fukushima	February 4, 2024
Despite the efforts of Percival's team, the Dark Talismans reassemble and have their injuries fully healed by Fiddich. When Sin restores the group's confidence with encouraging words, the Dark Talismans identify Sin as the group's ringleader and trap him with themselves inside a Perfect Cube to dispose of him. However, Sin kills Elgin, Burgie, and Doronach before assuming his human form, revealing his true identity as Lancelot to everyone. Lancelot effortlessly outmaneuvers Fiddich through his mind-reading abilities, interrogating him over the whereabouts of a knight in a star-shaped visor and Dubs the giant craftsman, before killing Fiddich when he attempts to retreat. Percival's friends become wary of Lancelot, but he regains their trust by explaining his mission of testing their resolve. Pellegarde arrives to challenge Percival again, but Lancelot abruptly teleports the group to Liones for an audience with Meliodas.
17	17	"The King of Liones"; Transliteration: "Rionesu Ō" (Japanese: リオネス王)	Arika Yamato	Hitomi Ezoe	February 11, 2024
Awestruck by the sights of Liones, Percival wanders away from his friends and eventually meets Meliodas, who continues to run the Boar's Hat tavern in addition to his duties as king. Meliodas requests Percival's help in saving Britannia, explaining that the Four Knights of the Apocalypse were chosen to save the world rather than destroy it. Percival is suddenly distracted by shimmering magic crystals belonging to Chion, a Holy Knight of Liones who serves Meliodas's son, Prince Tristan. After Percival angers Chion's teammate Isolde by accidentally sticking his head up her skirt, Chion convinces her and fellow teammate Jade that Percival is one of Camelot's Chaos Knights, and prevents Percival from explaining himself by summoning a sylph to steal his voice. In the ensuing fight, Jade covers Percival's head in a sphere of darkness to blind him. Percival's friends arrive to defend Percival, but the sylph steals their voices before Isolde injures them with her mace. Unable to see if his friends are alive, Percival becomes aggressive towards the knights before Tristan intervenes.
18	18	"Knights of Prophecy Meet"; Transliteration: "Yogen no Kishi no Kaikō" (Japanese: 予言の騎士の邂逅)	Chika Nenbe & Noriko Tajiri	Akitaro Daichi	February 18, 2024
Meliodas visits the bedridden former king Bartra, who foretells the moon and a distant thunderstorm will herald the Four Knights of the Apocalypse assembling, while an assassin of chaos and a traitor will bring disaster. Meanwhile, still blinded by Jade's magic, Percival goes berserk and attacks Tristan's team until he is calmed by his friends, who explain his identity as one of the Four Knights of the Apocalypse to Tristan's team. Chion claims he mistook Percival for an enemy after seeing Isolde chase him, but Anne realizes he attacked Percival deliberately when Tristan scolds him for forgetting the description of Percival he received from Meliodas. Tristan reveals himself and Lancelot to be two of the Four Knights, and that he has brought the fourth knight, Gawain, a relative of King Arthur who wears an all-concealing suit of armor. However, Lancelot reports that Gawain has fled the castle. Percival and Tristan's teams split up to search for Gawain as it begins to drizzle and the moon appears. While monitoring the city, Lancelot is approached by a young girl who proclaims herself his lover and kisses him on the lips.
19	19	"Liones in Flames"; Transliteration: "Shakunetsu no Rionesu" (Japanese: 灼熱のリオネス)	Kim Min-Sun	Kim Min-Sun	February 25, 2024
The girl, Guinevere, demonstrates complete familiarity with Lancelot despite just meeting him, and informs him of where he will find Gawain. Meanwhile, Chion sneaks away to assassinate Gawain, paranoid towards the prophecied knights besides Tristan. Alerted to Chion's intentions by Anne, Tristan stops him from killing a figure wearing Gawain's armor, whom they discover to be an unrelated man who found Gawain's suit discarded and donned it on a whim. Elsewhere, Percival's group meets an unarmored man they suspect to be Gawain until Percival recognizes him as an unmasked Pellegarde, who has followed Percival from the Entangled Forest. The two resume their battle, which disrupts a muscular young woman's attempt to court Isolde. Agitated, the woman extinguishes Pellegarde's magic flames with her power of sunlight, revealing herself as Gawain. Tristan and Lancelot assemble with Percival and Gawain in the commotion, completing the Four Knights of the Apocalypse.
20	20	"Taming a Wild Horse"; Transliteration: "Jaja Uma Narashi" (Japanese: じゃじゃ馬ならし)	Haruki Kasugamori	Haruki Kasugamori	March 3, 2024
The Four Knights disagree over how to deal with Pellegarde, with Gawain wanting to kill him for angering her. Percival tempts Pellegarde with an offer to join forces against Arthur, but Pellegarde declines and kidnaps Percival, trapping the others in a Perfect Cube. Gawain removes the barrier with an Absolute Cancel spell and attacks Pellegarde, who protects Percival when Gawain arrogantly shows no concern for the boy's safety. Percival stops Gawain from killing Pellegarde, leading her to assault Percival for his interference. Despite her tremendous power, however, she is defeated by Pellegarde due to her lack of combat skill, which sends her into a violent, childish tantrum. Tristan allows Pellegarde to flee for saving Percival, then placates Gawain by bolstering her ego. Meanwhile, two cloaked figures in Liones are cornered by a squadron of Holy Knights. One of the figures escapes while the other cloak lifts to reveal Melascula and Galland, members of the Demon Clan's Ten Commandments who have been reborn as Arthur's servants to take revenge against the Seven Deadly Sins.
21	21	"The Four Knights vs. the Servants of Chaos"; Transliteration: "Mokushiroku no Yonkishi VS Konton no Shito" (Japanese: 〈黙示録の四騎士〉 VS 混沌の使徒)	Keiko Oyamada	Hatsuki Tsuji	March 10, 2024
Melascula and Galland begin killing Liones's Holy Knights and non-human residents before the Four Knights arrive to battle them. Galland targets Gawain after sensing her magic's resemblance to that of Escanor, his adversary from the Seven Deadly Sins, which reminds him of his forgotten past as a demon, activating a spell Arthur placed on him that drives him insane. Gawain slices through Galland's indestructible body by teleporting her sword into him, allowing Percival to destroy him from the inside with an explosive Mini-Percival. Meanwhile, Lancelot interrogates Melascula over her and Galland's comrade, whom he confirms as the star visor knight. Melascula falls under Arthur's spell and is forced into her true form as a giant snake, but is defeated by Tristan's demonic powers, leaving a Chaos Staff behind.
22	22	"Freezing, Burning Hearts"; Transliteration: "Itetsuki Moyuru Kokoro" (Japanese: 凍てつき燃ゆる心)	Maki Odaira, Rintarō Kitabayashi & Taiki Nishimura	Masayoshi Nishida	March 17, 2024
The star visor knight infiltrates the castle dungeon to retrieve an imprisoned comrade, interrupting Jade's interrogation of Chion. Jade and Chion are aided by Vice-Captain Guila, who unmasks the star visor knight as Jericho, formerly a Holy Knight of Liones and Lancelot's teacher who has since defected to Camelot. Jericho's ice magic freezes Guila despite the latter retaining her demonic abilities as a New Generation Holy Knight, but Lancelot stops Jericho from killing her. However, Jericho finds the prisoner, whom she is forced to kill to protect Camelot's secrets after failing to free him from his magic binds. Confronted by Lancelot for betraying his father, Ban, Jericho confesses to falling in love with Lancelot when he was a young child while she was still an adult; disgusted by her own inappropriate feelings, she joined Camelot under Arthur's promise to create a world where an older version of Lancelot can reciprocate her love. Jericho teleports to Camelot while Lancelot furiously screams Arthur's name. Meanwhile, the Chaos Staff activates and revives Melascula and Galland as a single, merged monster.
23	23	"Royal Holy Knights vs. Mela-Galland"; Transliteration: "Ōkoku Seikishi VS Meragaran" (Japanese: 王国聖騎士 VS メラガラン)	Yasurō Tsuchiya	Toshihiko Masuda	March 24, 2024
The Knights of the Apocalypse and their allies battle the fusion of Melascula and Galland, dubbed "Mela-Galland", whose magic prevents their attacks from connecting. Gawain uses up her magic to damage Mela-Galland with an explosive spell to the surrounding area, causing Gawain to shrink to a childlike size. When the knights are further disoriented, town doctor Hendrickson arrives and explains the cause is a neurotoxin produced by Mela-Galland, allowing Nasiens to neutralize it. Dreyfus and Isolde arrive to support the Four Knights along with the rest of Liones's Holy Knights, which amplifies Percival's magic to the point of creating an army of intelligent Mini-Percivals to protect the Holy Knights. Further fueled by the knights' hope, Percival's attacks are strengthened enough to harm Mela-Galland's impenetrable body.
24	24	"Advent"; Transliteration: "Kōrin" (Japanese: 降臨)	Nobuo Tomizawa & Haruki Kasugamori	Kazuhide Tomonaga & Haruki Kasugamori	March 31, 2024
Percival is assisted by Isolde against Mela-Galland, but both are outmatched against Mela-Galland despite Percival's newfound power. Tristan saves Isolde and, angered by her injuries, fully taps into his demon side after requesting Hendrickson to summon Lancelot for him. Tristan's demonic powers allow him to defeat Mela-Galland, but also cause him to lose all self-restraint and brutally maim Mela-Galland to death; sensing Tristan's predicament, Meliodas prepares to enter the battle to support him. Upon Mela-Galland's death, Arthur descends from the sky on a staircase made of rubble from the battle to personally assess the Four Knights' strength. Percival and Tristan charge towards Arthur, but he effortlessly deflects them and brandishes hundreds of magic blades in a display of power that immobilizes his opponents.

===== Season 2 (2024) =====
No. overall	No. in season	Title	Directed by	Storyboarded by	Original release date
25	1	"The Power of the King"; Transliteration: "Ō no Ikō" (Japanese: 王の威光)	Yasurō Tsuchiya	Maki Odaira	October 6, 2024
As King Arthur demonstrates his immense power, he offers the citizens of Liones to join his cause in Camelot by claiming he will enable them to see the loved ones they lost in the Holy War sixteen years prior. As Tristan grows further out of control by his demonic power, Meliodas arrives to his aid and battles Arthur, but not even he can rival the evil king's intense strength. Tristan's power begins to overwhelm him, and as Meliodas tends to him, Lancelot appears and fights Arthur himself, but despite the former easily overpowering him, Arthur flees as his knights arrive. Afterward, Percival and his friends spend the night in the castle, where Anne expresses she was disillusioned by the citizens' earlier pleas to be taken to Camelot when Arthur's cavalry arrived. The four soon fall asleep, while Lancelot takes a walk and remembers Jericho's earlier confession, as well as the mysterious young girl he met before.
26	2	"Prepared to Part Ways"; Transliteration: "Wakare no Ketsui" (Japanese: 別れの決意)	Haruki Kasugamori	Maki Odaira	October 13, 2024
The following day after Arthur's attack on Liones, Meliodas calls Percival and his friends for a meeting, where he and Queen Elizabeth propose that the four prepare to say goodbye. Percival and his friends tearfully believe they are parting ways before Meliodas reveals the true reason: he anoints Anne, Nasiens, and Donny as Holy Knights, allowing them to support Percival; he also learns that Percival possesses the sword made from the Coffin of Eternal Darkness fragment and allows him to keep it. Meliodas later gathers the Four Knights and their friends and sends them on a mission to find a way into Camelot, which erects a barrier that prevents anyone but humans from entering the realm. Additionally, he reveals that as Arthur creates something with his Chaos power, Britannia's landmass depletes as an expense, intel he received from Percival's grandfather Varghese. After the meeting, Lancelot manages to track down the mysterious girl.
27	3	"Guinevere"; Transliteration: "Ginevia" (Japanese: ギネヴィア)	Nobuo Tomizawa	Kim Min-Sun	October 20, 2024
Lancelot meets the mysterious girl, named Guinevere. Hailing from a distant kingdom, Guinevere reveals that she possesses a precognitive magical power known as "Kaleidoscope", which allows her to see into the future via her dreams. After spending some time with her, Lancelot parts ways with Guinevere; just as he leaves, however, Guinevere is abducted by Ironside, and Lancelot fails to stop this, only hearing her encouraging him to find and rescue her. Soon, Lancelot joins the others as they depart Liones on their mission. Afterward, after Meliodas laments his relationship with Tristan, he reveals to Elizabeth that he had learned of Guinevere's arrival and kidnapping.
28	4	"Confrontation"; Transliteration: "Taiji" (Japanese: 対峙)	Eiichi Hayashi & Akihiro Izumi	Nobuo Tomizawa	October 27, 2024
Guinevere is teleported to Camelot and taken to Arthur. Despite cynically warning him against refusing the past, he resolves to use Guinevere's precognitions to destroy the Four Knights and their allies. Meanwhile, the group arrives at their first stop, a walled city known as Wolnack; they arrive just in time for a traditional festival the townsfolk celebrate to honor the lives lost in the New Holy War. The group stops at a hotel for the evening, deciding through a game of rock-paper-scissors over which rooms they bunk in. While most of them get shared rooms, Tristan ends up sharing an occupied room with a woman named Io, who Isolde and Chion are instantly wary of. Unbeknownst to them, however, two assassins sent by Arthur spy on the group, planning to separate them and then take them out. As they celebrate the festival, Tristan is taken aside by Io, while Isodle, Jade, and Anne stray from the others to search for them. After Anne and the Tristan Platoon split up into groups of two to search for Tristan, Isodle and Anne are attacked by one of the assassins, Teaninch, a woman with the magical power to control animals, while Percival, Donny, Nasiens and Chion are attacked by the second assassin, who eliminates all sound in his presence before brutally attacking them. Meanwhile, Tristan engages Io in battle after exposing her as a demon.
29	5	"City of Battle"; Transliteration: "Kabe no Machi no Tatakai" (Japanese: 壁の町の戦い)	Nobuo Tomizawa & Maki Odaira	Haruki Kasugamori & Daisuke Sakamoto	November 10, 2024
30	6	"Flames of Reminiscences"; Transliteration: "Tsuioku no Honō" (Japanese: 追憶の炎)	Yasurō Tsuchiya	Masayoshi Nishida	November 17, 2024
31	7	"The Crazed King"; Transliteration: "Kyō-ō" (Japanese: 狂王)	Kim Min-Sun & Nobuo Tomizawa	Akitaro Daichi	November 24, 2024
32	8	"Savior"; Transliteration: "Sukuinushi-sama" (Japanese: 救い主様)	Kim Min-Sun & Nobuo Tomizawa	Nobuo Tomizawa	December 1, 2024
33	9	"Behemoth of Calamity"; Transliteration: "Wazawai no Behimosu" (Japanese: 災いのベヒモス)	J-Cube	Masayoshi Nishida	December 8, 2024
34	10	"Wavering Hearts"; Transliteration: "Yureru Kokoro" (Japanese: 揺れるココロ)	Daisuke Sakamoto	Masayoshi Nishida	December 15, 2024
35	11	"The Fated Boy"; Transliteration: "Shukumei no Shōnen" (Japanese: 宿命の少年)	Yasuo Tsuchiya	Nobuo Tomizawa	December 22, 2024
36	12	"Banquet for Braves"; Transliteration: "Tsuwamonotachi no Utage" (Japanese: 強者たちの宴)	Nobuo Tomizawa	Maki Odaira & Nobuo Tomizawa	December 29, 2024

== Reception ==
=== Popularity ===
In June 2021, Four Knights of the Apocalypse was nominated for the seventh Next Manga Award in the print category.

=== Critical response ===
Ever since it began its serialization, the series has received a generally positive reception from fans and critics alike. Junko Kuroda said the manga is "definitely an adventure fantasy that can be enjoyed smoothly", even for fans unfamiliar with The Seven Deadly Sins.
