= Erik Scott Kimerer =

American voice actor

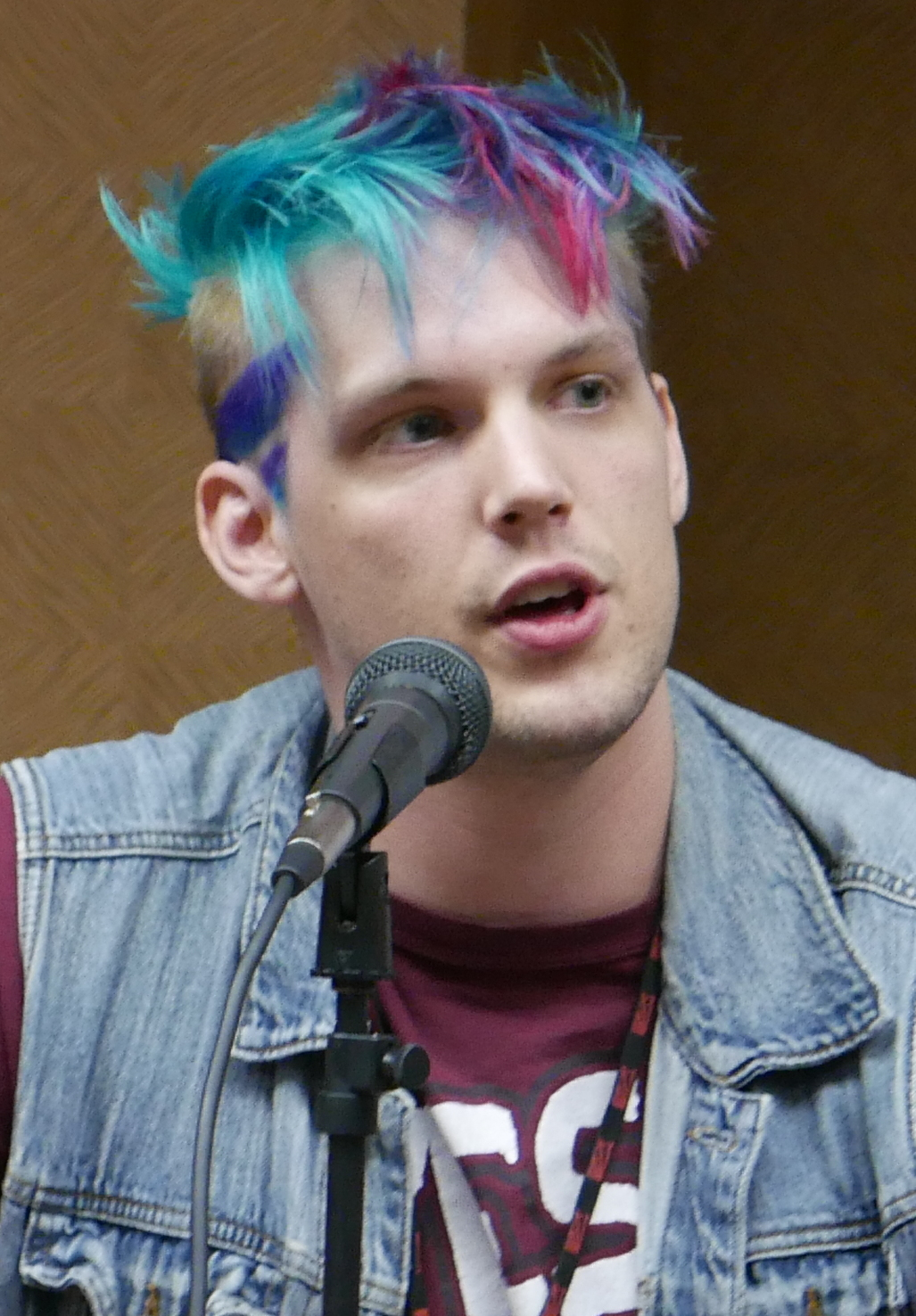
- Kimerer at the 2017 Nan Desu Kan
- Born: July 6, 1988 (age 38); Edmonds, Washington, U.S.
- Occupations: Voice actor; professional wrestler
- Years active: 2010–present

Erik Scott Kimerer (born July 6, 1988) is an American voice actor and professional wrestler under the name Sassy Assassin in Brian Kendrick's Wrestling Pro Wrestling (WPW). As a voice actor, he has provided voices for the English dubs of Japanese anime and video games. Some of his major voice roles include Ryuji Takasu in Toradora!, Obanai Iguro in Demon Slayer: Kimetsu no Yaiba, Biscuit Griffon in Mobile Suit Gundam: Iron-Blooded Orphans, Riku Mikami in Gundam Build Divers, Alibaba Saluja in the Magi series, Hydra Knell in Blood Lad, Speed o' Sound Sonic in One-Punch Man, Teruki Hanazawa in Mob Psycho 100, Ayato Amagiri in The Asterisk War, and Haruyuki Arita in Accel World.

== Filmography ==
=== Anime ===
List of voice performances in anime
Year	Title	Role	Notes	Source
2010	K-On!!	Guitar Store Employee (uncredited)	Ep. 11	
2012	Mahoromatic: I'm Home	Toshiya Hamaguchi		
2013	Nura: Rise of the Yokai Clan	Inugami, Saburo-Neko		
2013	Sword Art Online	Ducker, Additional Voices	Ep. 3	
2013–14	Accel World	Haruyuki Arita (Silver Crow)		
2014–15	Magi: The Labyrinth of Magic	Alibaba Saluja	Also Kingdom	
2014	Toradora!	Ryuji Takasu		
2014	Blood Lad	Hydra Knell		
2015–21	The Seven Deadly Sins	Gowther		
2016	Mobile Suit Gundam: Iron-Blooded Orphans	Biscuit Griffon		
2016–2020	One-Punch Man	Speed-o'-Sound Sonic		
2016	Your Lie in April	Takeshi Aiza		
2016	The Asterisk War	Ayato Amagiri		
2017	Mob Psycho 100	Teruki Hanazawa	also season 2	
2017	Berserk	Isidoro	2016 series	
2017	Sailor Moon SuperS	Fish Eye	Viz Media dub	
2018	Beyblade Burst Turbo	Jonji		
2018	Gundam Build Divers	Riku Mikami		
2018	Sirius the Jaeger	Philip		
2019	Cells at Work!	B Cell		
2019	The Rising of the Shield Hero	Itsuki Kawasumi		
2019	Carole & Tuesday	Joshua, Pyotr		
2019	Kengan Ashura	Kaneda Suekichi, Yoroizuka Saw Paing, Hanafusa Hajime, Nikaido Ren and young Tokita Ohma	Netflix	
2020	JoJo's Bizarre Adventure: Golden Wind	Secco		
2020	Demon Slayer: Kimetsu no Yaiba	Obanai Iguro		
2020	Re:Zero − Starting Life in Another World	Lye Batenkaitos, Patrasche		
2021	Kuroko's Basketball	Ryōta Kise	Netflix dub	
2021	Demon Slayer: Kimetsu no Yaiba – The Movie: Mugen Train	Obanai Iguro		
2022	Don't Toy with Me, Miss Nagatoro	Senpai/Naoto Hachiouji		
2021	Sailor Moon Eternal	Fish Eye	Netflix dub	

=== Video games ===
List of voice performances in video games
Year	Title	Role	Notes	Source
2010	Heroes of Newerth	Joven Glacius		
2011	Inazuma Eleven	Mark Evans		
2012	Skullgirls	Black Egrets		
2014	Mugen Souls Z	Ace		
2016	Atelier Sophie: The Alchemist of the Mysterious Book	Oskar Belmer		
2016	2064: Read Only Memories	Oliver, Sky		
2017	Dark Rose Valkyrie	Asahi Shiramine		
2019	Zanki Zero: Last Beginning	Creature of Pride, Sho Terashima		
2019	Pokémon Masters	Barry, Grant		
2020	One-Punch Man: A Hero Nobody Knows	Speed o' Sound Sonic		
2021	Re:Zero − Starting Life in Another World: The Prophecy of the Throne	Patrasche		
2021	Demon Slayer: Kimetsu no Yaiba – The Hinokami Chronicles	Obanai Iguro		

=== Animation ===
Year	Title	Role	Notes	Source
2018	Birdboy: The Forgotten Children	Mr. Reloggio	English dub	

== Professional wrestling career ==
=== Wrestling pro wrestling (2019 – ) ===
In 2018, Kimerer had his debut in professional wrestling as the Sassy Assassin. A sneaky thief with a lisp. As the Sassy Assassin, Kimerer debuted in Hoodslam SoCal-iente, in a losing effort against Otto Von Clutch. A year later, he would make his WPW debut in the WPW Gauntlet Battle Royal with Sneaky Pete (RJ Santos) in a losing effort. Months later. The two would be in a match winning the WPW Tag Team championships, Erik Kimerer's first and thus far only championship in professional wrestling. He and Santos however, would lose the tag team championships to the Two Man Gang, in the team's first title defense.
