= Takafumi Wada =

Japanese composer (born 1979)

- 和田 貴史
- Born: February 8, 1979 (age 46); Chiba Prefecture, Japan
- Education: Department of Composition, Tokyo College of Music
- Occupations: Composer; arranger; music producer
- Years active: 2002–present
- Agents: Dimension Cruise; Beagle Kick
- Musical career
- Genres: Soundtrack; electronic; classical; orchestral; J-pop; anison
- Instruments: Piano; keyboard
- Labels: Dimension Cruise Records; As Vox Records
- Website: takafumi-wada.com

Takafumi Wada (和田 貴史, Wada Takafumi; born February 8, 1979) is a Japanese composer, arranger, and music producer. He has provided the music for several anime series, television dramas, films, and video games. He is best known for his role on the soundtrack of The Seven Deadly Sins, Seraph of the End and Highschool of the Dead.

Wada is the founder and current CEO of the music production company Dimension Cruise, established in 2006. He is also the founder of the music agency Beagle Kick.

== Biography ==
Wada was born in Chiba Prefecture, in 1979. After he finished highschool, he went to Tokyo and later graduated from the Department of Composition at Tokyo College of Music. After that, he studied composition under the music teacher Kazuki Kuriyama, whom Wada would work with as an assistant on future projects.

Wada's musician career started in 2002, with him primarily involved in video game soundtracks.

In 2006, he founded Dimension Cruise, a music agency with the labels Dimension Cruise Records and As Vox Records.

He began composing for anime series in 2009. A year later, he became more popular on the industry for his role as the composer for the series Highschool of the Dead.

Since then, he has been involved in many visual media works, mostly in projects alongside composer Hiroyuki Sawano.

== Works ==
=== Anime ===
| Year | Title | Note(s) |
|---|---|---|
| 2009 | Rideback | |
| 2010 | Highschool of the Dead | |
| 2011 | Highschool of the Dead: Drifters of the Dead | |
| 2014 | The Seven Deadly Sins | Other tracks by Hiroyuki Sawano |
| 2015 | Seraph of the End | Other tracks by Hiroyuki Sawano, Asami Tachibana and Megumi Shiraishi |
| 2015 | The Seven Deadly Sins OVA | Other tracks by Hiroyuki Sawano |
| 2015 | Seraph of the End: Battle in Nagoya | Other tracks by Hiroyuki Sawano, Asami Tachibana and Megumi Shiraishi |
| 2016 | Terra Formars: Revenge | |
| 2016 | The Seven Deadly Sins: Signs of Holy War | Other tracks by Hiroyuki Sawano |
| 2018 | The Seven Deadly Sins: Revival of the Commandments | Other tracks by Hiroyuki Sawano and Kohta Yamamoto |
| 2018 | The Seven Deadly Sins the Movie: Prisoners of the Sky | Other tracks by Hiroyuki Sawano |
| 2019 | The Seven Deadly Sins: Wrath of the Gods | Other tracks by Hiroyuki Sawano and Kohta Yamamoto |
| 2021 | The Seven Deadly Sins: Dragon's Judgement | Other tracks by Hiroyuki Sawano and Kohta Yamamoto |
| 2025 | Headhunted to Another World: From Salaryman to Big Four! | |

=== Television dramas ===
| Year | Title | Note(s) |
|---|---|---|
| 2009 | RESCUE ~ Special Altitude Rescue Team | |
| 2009 | BOSS | Other tracks by Hiroyuki Sawano and Yuki Hayashi |
| 2009 | Hi no Sakana | |
| 2009 | My Girl | Other tracks by Hiroyuki Sawano |
| 2010 | Massugu na Otoko | Other tracks by Hiroyuki Sawano |
| 2010 | Tumbling | |
| 2011 | BOSS 2nd Season | Other tracks by Hiroyuki Sawano and Yuki Hayashi |
| 2012 | Presumed Guilty | Other tracks by Hiroyuki Sawano and Kengo Tokusashi |
| 2013 | Someday at a Place in the Sun | Other tracks by Hiroyuki Sawano and Kengo Tokusashi |
| 2013 | Hard Nuts! | |
| 2015 | Gattan Gattan Soredemo Go | |
| 2018 | Thunderbolt Fantasy Season 2 | Other tracks by Hiroyuki Sawano |
| 2020 | Utsubyō Kudan | Other tracks by Junka Horiguchi |
| 2021 | Thunderbolt Fantasy Season 3 | Other tracks by Hiroyuki Sawano and Kohta Yamamoto |

=== Movies ===
| Year | Title |
|---|---|
| 2006 | Beruna no Shippo |
| 2006 | Mizutama Mizuchi |
| 2008 | Yesterdays |

=== Video games ===
| Year | Title | Note(s) |
|---|---|---|
| 2002 | Genmukan ~Aiyoku to Ryoujoku no Inzai~ | |
| 2002 | Initial D: Another Stage | |
| 2003 | Bakuso Dekotra Densetsu Otoko Hanamichi Yume Roman | |
| 2003 | The Wild Rings | |
| 2003 | Fire Pro Wrestling Z | |
| 2003 | After... | Other tracks by Keishi Yanao and Daisuke Ban |
| 2003 | Tomorrow's Joe Masshiro ni Moe Tsukiro! | |
| 2003 | Tomorrow's Joe Makkani Moeagare! | |
| 2003 | Zatch Bell! Electric Arena | |
| 2004 | Shinshou Genmukan | |
| 2005 | Kenka Banchou | |
| 2005 | Fire Pro Wrestling Returns | Other tracks by Yoko Wada and Mituhiro Uehara |
| 2007 | Fighting Chief 2 ~ Full Throttle ~ | Other tracks by Hirokazu Koshio, Kemmei Adachi, Mitsugu Suzuki, Ryu and OGR |
| 2007 | Arkanoid DS | Other tracks by Hirokazu Koshio, Kemmei Adachi, Mitsugu Suzuki, Ryu and OGR |
| 2008 | Jawa: Mammoth and the Secret Stone | |
| 2008 | Space Invaders Get Even | Other tracks by Atsuhiro Motoyama and Hirotaka Kikuchi |
| 2009 | Fault!! | |
| 2015 | Monster Hunter Generations | |
