= Kohta Yamamoto =

Japanese composer (born 1987)

Kohta Yamamoto 山本 康太
- Born: 1987 (age 38–39); Tokyo, Japan
- Genres: Electronic rock; classical rock; acoustic rock; metal
- Occupations: Composer; arranger; lyricist
- Instruments: Keyboard
- Years active: 2015–present
- Label: Legendoor (2015–2017)
- Website: www.kohtayamamoto.net

Kohta Yamamoto (山本 康太, Yamamoto Kōta; born 1987) (stylized in all caps) is a Japanese composer, arranger, and lyricist who has worked on the soundtrack of many anime series. He is best known for composing the soundtrack for Attack on Titan: The Final Season, for which he won the Crunchyroll Anime Award for Best Score.

== Biography ==
Yamamoto was born in Tokyo, in 1987. His musician career started in 2015, with him writing songs for other artists. In 2017, alongside Hiroyuki Sawano, Yamamoto made his debut as a composer in the anime Blue Exorcist: Kyoto Saga, the sequel of the popular series Blue Exorcist. Since then, he has been involved in many soundtrack works, several of which with composer Hiroyuki Sawano.

In February 2022, Yamamoto and Sawano were awarded at the Anime Trending Awards for their role on the soundtrack of the anime 86.

On November 13, 2022, Yamamoto attended an orchestral concert event for the concluding season of Attack on Titan. The event was held at Tokyo's Tachikawa Stage Garden, with him performing tracks from the Attack on Titan's score.

Yamamoto also attended the 7th Crunchyroll Anime Awards on March 4, 2023, performing the track "Ashes on the Fire" from Attack on Titan: The Final Season; he and Sawano won the award for Best Score for their work on the show.

== Works ==
=== Anime ===
Year	Title	Role(s)
2017	Blue Exorcist: Kyoto Saga	Composer (other tracks by Hiroyuki Sawano)
2017	Dive!!	Composer (other tracks by Yuki Hayashi)
2018	The Seven Deadly Sins: Revival of The Commandments	Composer (other tracks by Hiroyuki Sawano and Takafumi Wada)
2018	The Girl in Twilight	Composer (other tracks by Kenji Ito and Shun Narita)
2018	Ulysses: Jeanne d'Arc and the Alchemist Knight	Opening theme song composer
2018	Senran Kagura Shinovi Master	Opening theme song composer and arranger
2019	Re:Stage! Dream Days	Composer
2019	The Seven Deadly Sins: Wrath of the Gods	Composer (other tracks by Hiroyuki Sawano)
2020	Kingdom Season 3	Composer (other tracks by Hiroyuki Sawano)
2020	Attack on Titan: The Final Season	Composer (other tracks by Hiroyuki Sawano)
2021	The Seven Deadly Sins: Dragon's Judgement	Composer (other tracks by Hiroyuki Sawano and Takafumi Wada)
2021	Moriarty the Patriot Season 2	Opening theme song composer, arranger and lyricist
2021	86	Composer (other tracks by Hiroyuki Sawano)
2021	The Seven Deadly Sins: Cursed by Light	Composer (other tracks by Hiroyuki Sawano)
2021	86 Part 2	Composer (other tracks by Hiroyuki Sawano)
2022	Attack on Titan: The Final Season Part 2	Composer (other tracks by Hiroyuki Sawano)
2022	Kingdom Season 4	Composer (other tracks by Hiroyuki Sawano)
2022	The Seven Deadly Sins: Grudge of Edinburgh	Composer (other tracks by Hiroyuki Sawano)
2023	Kaina of the Great Snow Sea	Composer (other tracks by Misaki Umase)
2023	Attack on Titan: The Final Season Final Chapters	Composer (other tracks by Hiroyuki Sawano)
2023	Sacrificial Princess and the King of Beasts	Composer
2023	Dark Gathering	Composer (other tracks by Shun Narita and Yusuke Ceo)
2023	Four Knights of the Apocalypse	Composer
2024	Blue Exorcist: Shimane Illuminati Saga / Beyond the Snow Saga / The Blue Night Saga	Composer (other tracks by Hiroyuki Sawano)
2024	Chained Soldier	Composer
2024	Dragon Raja: The Blazing Dawn	Composer
2024	The Strongest Magician in the Demon Lord's Army Was a Human	Composer
2024	Mechanical Arms	Composer (other tracks by Hiroyuki Sawano and Daiki)
2025	The Rose of Versailles	Composer (other tracks by Hiroyuki Sawano)
2025	Tougen Anki	Composer
2026	Kaya-chan Isn't Scary	Composer (other tracks by Shun Narita)
2026	Petals of Reincarnation	Composer
2026	Romelia War Chronicle	Composer
2027	The Otome Heroine's Fight for Survival	Composer (other tracks by Shun Narita and Yūki Furuhashi)

=== Television dramas ===
Year	Title	Role(s)
2017	CRISIS	Composer (other tracks by Hiroyuki Sawano)
2019	Sign: Houigakusha Yuzuki Takashi no Jiken	Composer (other tracks by Hiroyuki Sawano)
2021	Thunderbolt Fantasy Season 3	Composer (other tracks by Hiroyuki Sawano and Takafumi Wada)
2023	Ōoku: The Inner Chambers	Composer
2024	Thunderbolt Fantasy Season 4	Composer (other tracks by Hiroyuki Sawano and Takafumi Wada)
2026	Tokyo MPD PR Unit 2	Composer (other tracks by Hiroyuki Sawano)

=== Video games ===
Year	Title	Role(s)
2016	The Idolmaster Million Live!	Composer and arranger
2016	Dark Rose Valkyrie	Ending theme song composer and arranger
2018	Kōtetsujō no Kabaneri -Ran- Hajimaru Michiato	Composer (other tracks by Hiroyuki Sawano)
2019	The Idolmaster SideM	Composer and arranger
2020	Fate/Grand Order Kyosuu Daikaisen Imaginary Scramble	Promotional video music creator
2023	Blue Protocol	Composer

=== Other involvements ===
Year	Title	Artist	Role(s)	Album
2015	"Kimi to Iuna no Tsubasa" and "Mōsukoshi"	Takeshi Tsuruno	Arranger	Tsuruno Uta 3
2017	"Reworld"	Sayaka Sasaki	Composer; Arranger	Fated Crown
2017	"Planetary"	Sayaka Sasaki	Composer; Arranger	Grand Symphony
2018	"Fly High Myway!"	Mai Fuchigami	Composer; Arranger; Programmer; Instruments	Fly High Myway!
2018	"SCARLET MASTER"	Sayaka Sasaki	Composer; Arranger	SCARLET MASTER
2018	"Liberation"	Mai Fuchigami	Composer	Liberation
2020	"Time To Burn", "Higher Ground", "Bratsruts", "Lite The Last Fire" and "It's So Quiet"	Knights of the Sound-Table	Composer; Arranger	Chapter One
2020	"Let's Hold Hands Tightly!"	Let's Te to Te de Kyun!	Composer; Arranger; Programmer; Keyboard; Instruments	Everybody☆Healin' Good Day!
2020	"SCARLET MASTER"	Sayaka Sasaki	Composer; Arranger	SAYABEST 2010–2020
2020	"Genjitsu"	Hannah Grace	Composer; Arranger	Genjitsu
2021	"Liberation"	Mai Fuchigami	Composer	HOSHIZORA
2021	"TWISTED HEARTS"	Tasuku Hatanaka	Composer; Arranger; Lyricist	TWISTED HEARTS
2022	"Tot Musica"	Ado	Composer; Chorus	Uta's Songs: One Piece Film Red
