= Makura no Danshi =

Japanese anime television series

枕男子
- Genre: Reverse harem
- Anime television series
- Written by: Yuniko Ayana; Ayumi Sekine
- Studio: Assez Finaud Fabric; Feel
- Original network: Tokyo MX, SUN-TV
- Original run: 13 July 2015 – 28 September 2015
- Episodes: 12

Makura no Danshi (枕男子; lit. 'Pillow Boys'), also known as Makuranodanshi, is a Japanese anime television series produced by Assez Finaud Fabric and Feel. It aired in Japan on 13 July 2015 and finished on 28 September 2015.

== Premise ==
The series is a first-person story, with each weekly episode featuring one of 12 different "pillow boys" who sleep beside the viewer.

== Characters ==
- Mary/Merry (めりぃ, Merii; Voiced by: Natsuki Hanae): Pillow boy. He is 8. He appeared in episode 1 and episode 12. His age changes in episode 12.
- Sōsuke Tanaka (田仲 聡輔, Tanaka Sōsuke; Voiced by: Daisuke Namikawa): Senpai boy. He is 32 years old. He appeared in episode 2.
- Kanade Hanamine (花嶺 奏, Hanamine Kanade; Voiced by: Yoshimasa Hosoya): Music boy. He is 18 years old. He appeared in episode 3.
- Eiji Kijinami (雉子波 瑛治, Kijinami Eiji; Voiced by: Sora Takahata): Dialect boy. He is 14 years old. He appeared in episode 4.
- Ryūshi Theodore Emori (永守・T・隆士, Emori Teodōru Ryūshi; Voiced by: Yuichiro Umehara): Astronomy boy. He is a 20-year-old. He appeared in episode 5.
- Yū Maiki (舞木 ユウ, Maiki Yū; Voiced by: Yoshitsugu Matsuoka): Chūni boy. He is a 15-year-old. He appeared in episode 6.
- Haruto Enokawa (可愛川 晴人, Enokawa Haruto; Voiced by: Ayumu Murase): Cherub boy. He is 5 years old. He appeared in episode 7.
- Nao Sasayama (笹山 直央, Sasayama Nao; Voiced by: Nobunaga Shimazaki): Riajū boy. He is 21 years old. He appeared in episode 8.
- Shirusu Mochizuki (望月 識, Mochidzuki Shirusu; Voiced by: Kōsuke Toriumi): Librarian boy. He is 28 years old. He appeared in episode 9.
- Yonaga Chigiri (千切 夜長, Chigiri Yonaga; Voiced by: Daisuke Kishio): Flower arrangement boy. He is 17 years old and Yayoi's twin brother. He appeared in episode 10 along with his twin brother.
- Yayoi Chigiri (千切 夜宵, Chigiri Yayoi; Voiced by: Shinnosuke Tachibana): Flower arrangement boy. He is 17 years old and Yonaga's twin brother. He appeared in episode 10 along with his twin brother.
- Yuichirō Iida (飯田 由一郎, Īda Yuichirō; Voiced by: Toshiyuki Morikawa): Yatai boy. He is a 41-year-old. He appeared in episode 11.

== Production ==
The series was announced for a July release date in May 2015. The series is animated by Assez Finaud Fabric and Feel and produced by Earth Star Entertainment, with writing by Yuniko Ayana and Ayumi Sekine, and character designs by Mika Yamamoto. The opening theme song, "Makura no Danshi", written by Masayoshi Ōishi, performed by voice actor Natsuki Hanae.

== Broadcast and release ==
It aired on Tokyo MX and SUN-TV starting on 13 July 2015 and finished on 28 September 2015. The series was released on DVD on 27 November 2015. The DVD release will include an unaired episode. The series is streamed by Comic Earth Star, and will be simulcast by Crunchyroll in the United States, Canada, Central and South America, the United Kingdom and Ireland, the Nordics, Netherlands, South Africa, Australia, and New Zealand.

== Episode list ==
No.	Title	Original release date
1	"Merry." (めりぃ)	13 July 2015
2	"Tanaka Sousuke." (田仲聡輔)	20 July 2015
3	"Hanamine Kanade." (花嶺 奏)	27 July 2015
4	"Kijinami Eiji." (雉子波 瑛治)	3 August 2015
5	"Emori Theodore Ryūshi" (永守・T・隆士)	10 August 2015
6	"Maiki Yū" (舞木 ユウ)	17 August 2015
7	"Enokawa Haruto" (可愛川 晴人)	24 August 2015
8	"Sasayama Nao" (笹山 直央)	31 August 2015
9	"Mochizuki Shirusu" (望月 識)	7 September 2015
10	"Chigiri Yonaga and Chigiri Yayoi" (千切 夜長 and 千切 夜宵)	14 September 2015
11	"Iida Yuichirō" (飯田 由一郎)	21 September 2015
12	"Merry." (めりぃ)	28 September 2015
