= Li'l Miss Vampire Can't Suck Right =

Japanese manga series

- First tankōbon volume cover, featuring Luna Ishikawa

ちゃんと吸えない吸血鬼ちゃん (Chanto Suenai Kyūketsuki-chan)
- Genre: Comedy
- Manga
- Written by: Kyōsuke Nishiki
- Published by: Fujimi Shobo
- English publisher: NA: Yen Press; Kadokawa (digital)
- Imprint: Dragon Comics Age
- Magazine: Monthly Dragon Age
- Original run: May 8, 2021 – August 8, 2025
- Volumes: 9
- Anime television series
- Directed by: Sayaka Yamai
- Written by: Yuniko Ayana
- Music by: Tomoki Kikuya
- Studio: Feel
- Licensed by: Crunchyroll; SEA: Plus Media Networks Asia
- Original network: AT-X, Tokyo MX, Kansai TV, BS Asahi
- Original run: October 12, 2025 – December 28, 2025
- Episodes: 12
- icon

Li'l Miss Vampire Can't Suck Right (Japanese: ちゃんと吸えない吸血鬼ちゃん, Hepburn: Chanto Suenai Kyūketsuki-chan; lit. 'Vampire-chan Can't Suck Properly') is a Japanese manga series written and illustrated by Kyōsuke Nishiki. It was serialized in Fujimi Shobo's Monthly Dragon Age magazine from May 2021 to August 2025, and was compiled into nine volumes. An anime television series adaptation produced by Feel aired from October to December 2025.

== Plot ==
The series follows Luna Ishikawa, a popular student who has a reputation among her classmates for being cold and mysterious. Despite being a vampire, she has difficulties in sucking blood, much to her chagrin. When her classmate Tatsuta Ōtori learns her secret, he offers her to let her suck his blood in exchange for him training her how to suck blood better.

== Characters ==
Luna Ishikawa (石川 月菜, Ishikawa Runa)
Voiced by: Amane Shindō (voice comic), Minami Tanaka (anime)
Luna is the most popular girl in class, but has a complex regarding her difficulty in sucking people's blood. She is new to school, having only transferred in shortly before the start of the story. Because of her inability to suck blood, she is often hungry, which she passes by eating sweets. She develops feelings for Tatsuta, who offers to help her with her problem. She is sometimes depicted in a chibi style, turning small at times from lack of sustenance or when sucking Tatsuta's blood or during comedic moments. As she is a vampire, she does not appear in pictures. At the end of the series, she has graduated from high school and is training as a student teacher at the school, where she reunites with Tatsuta.
Tatsuta Ōtori (大鳥 辰太, Ōtori Tatsuta) (Note: Usually Ōtori is spelled 大鳥 (big bird/chicken), however in anime ep.6 his parents' shop is labelled 大酉酒店 (Õtori Liquor Store), with Õtori spelled 大酉. 酉 is an uncommon kanji that can mean bird/rooster, but also alcohol.)
Voiced by: Shun Horie (voice comic), Kensho Ono (anime)
Luna's classmate who offers to help train her become better at blood sucking. Initially he hardly talks to any of his classmates, but that gradually changes after meeting Luna, whom he develops a crush on. His parents run a liquor store. He is a skilled artist and is a member of the art club: a chance meeting with Luna inspired her to transfer to his school after seeing his drawings.
Eiko Sakuma (佐久間 瑛子, Sakuma Eiko)
Voiced by: M.A.O
Luna and Tatsuta's classmate and the captain of the school volleyball team.
Misa Kusunoki (楠木 美紗, Kusunoki Misa)
Voiced by: Ikumi Hasegawa
Luna and Tatsuta's classmate. She is an aspiring designer, having been inspired by her designer mother. She and Eiko have been friends since junior high school.
Daichi Chiba (千葉 大地, Chiba Daichi)
Voiced by: Katsumi Fukuhara
Satoru Deguchi (出口 悟, Deguchi Satoru)
Voiced by: Yūya Hirose
Maimi Suzuki (鈴木 舞美, Suzuki Maimi)
Voiced by: Shion Wakayama
Yui Hashimoto (橋本 結衣, Hashimoto Yui)
Voiced by: Konomi Inagaki
Yukari Henmi (辺見 紫, Henmi Yukari)
Voiced by: Ayasa Itō
Misuzu Kirimine (霧峰 みすず, Kirimine Misuzu)
Voiced by: Kotono Mitsuishi
Ruri Umishima (海島 瑠李, Umishima Ruri)
Voiced by: Hikaru Tono
Kanae Yamada (矢又 叶, Yamada Kanae)
Voiced by: Haruka Aikawa
Akari Karakida (唐木田 灯, Karakida Akari)
Voiced by: Momo Harumi
Nene Ōtori (大鳥 ねね, Ōtori Nene)
Voiced by: Nana Mizuki
Tatsuta's mother.
Shirayuri Ishikawa (石川 白百合, Ishikawa Shirayuri)
Voiced by: Mamiko Noto
Luna's mother. She is happy to see that Luna has made friends given her past as a shy loner.

== Media ==
=== Manga ===
Written and illustrated by Kyōsuke Nishiki, Li'l Miss Vampire Can't Suck Right was serialized in Fujimi Shobo's Monthly Dragon Age magazine from May 8, 2021, to August 8, 2025. Its chapters were compiled into nine tankōbon volumes, released from October 8, 2021, to October 9, 2025. A series of voice comics (voice comic) starring Amane Shindō and Shun Horie as Luna Ishikawa and Tatsuta Ōtori was posted on the official Kadokawa YouTube channel in 2021.

On February 7, 2025, Yen Press announced that they had licensed the series for English publication, with the first volume releasing in July. In June 2025, Kadokawa announced that it would digitally publish the series in English on the BookWalker Global service starting on June 7.

No.	Original release date	Original ISBN	English release date	English ISBN
1	October 8, 2021	978-4-04-074314-1	July 22, 2025	979-8-8554-0966-6
2	March 9, 2022	978-4-04-074464-3	January 20, 2026	979-8-8554-0968-0
3	September 9, 2022	978-4-04-074671-5	July 28, 2026	979-8-8554-0970-3
4	April 7, 2023	978-4-04-074938-9	April 27, 2027	979-8-8554-0972-7
5	October 6, 2023	978-4-04-075171-9	—	—
6	May 9, 2024	978-4-04-075441-3	—	—
7	October 9, 2024	978-4-04-075645-5	—	—
8	April 9, 2025	978-4-04-075868-8	—	—
9	October 9, 2025	978-4-04-076122-0	—	—

=== Anime ===
An anime television series adaptation was announced on February 4, 2025. It is produced by Feel and directed by Sayaka Yamai, with series composition by Yuniko Ayana, character designs handled by Takuya Tani, and music composed by Tomoki Kikuya. The series aired from October 12 to December 28, 2025, on AT-X and other networks. The opening theme song is "Seishun no Silhouette" (青春のシルエッ; 'Youthful Silhouette'), performed by HΔG, while the ending theme song is "Senkō Hanabi" (線香花火; 'Sparklers'), performed by HΔG and Minami Tanaka. Crunchyroll streamed the series. Plus Media Networks Asia licensed the series in Southeast Asia and broadcasts it on Aniplus Asia.

==== Episodes ====
No.	Title	Directed by	Written by	Storyboarded by	Original release date
1	"Li'l Miss Vampire Is Very Bad"; Transliteration: "Kyūketsuki-chan wa Metcha Heta" (Japanese: 吸血鬼ちゃんはめっちゃ下手)	Yuri Pinzon & Elijah Ragas	Yuniko Ayana	Sayaka Yamai	October 12, 2025
In a world where monsters and spirits live alongside humans vampire Luna Ishikawa is popular at school due to her mysterious, refined aura. One day she and her seatmate Tatsuta Otori are assigned cleaning duties and Tatsuta notices she is actually clumsy, messy and snacks constantly. It transpires Luna is unskilled at taking blood and snacks to distract herself from being hungry. Tatsuta offers to let her practise on him but when she bites him he feels an unexpected motherly affection for her he enjoys immensely. Luna makes a mess of his arm and also takes too much blood at once, making him faint. Luna notices his blood was particularly tasty and asks if they can keep practising in secret. In public they continue to act as strangers so Luna's secret won't be revealed. Tatsuta notices her becoming hungry in class and lets her bite him without anyone noticing, though he faints again despite enjoying the feeling. Having lunch on the roof he convinces her taking big bites would be more effective than nibbling to find veins. Luna reveals she has retractable wings and can fly when well fed.
2	"Li'l Miss Vampire and Sakuma-san"; Transliteration: "Kyūketsuki-chan to Sakuma-san" (Japanese: 吸血鬼ちゃんと佐久間さん)	Yuri Pinzon & Neil Lamadrid	Sumika Hayakawa	Ichizō Kobayashi	October 19, 2025
Tatsuta finds Luna reading vampire light novels and she admits she bases her persona on her favourite character. Tatsuta points out typical vampires bite necks but Luna is too embarrassed for that. She is happily embarrassed when Tatsuta prefers she keep using his arm as he can look at her face. Their classmate Sakuma catches them and admits she heard everything. Luna fears Sakuma won't think she is cool anymore, but Sakuma finds Luna being incompetent even more adorable. She volunteers to let Luna bite her as well, but finds her so cute she passes out before Luna even bites her. Luna is surprised Sakuma likes her real self and her cool persona too. The next day she is hear real self in class, making her even more popular. Tatsuta flees when he is outed as one of Luna's close friends as he doesn't like receiving attention. He is further pushed aside when dozens of people offer to share blood if she needs it. Luna goes looking for him but meets vampire fans Kanae and Ruri instead. By the end of the day Tatsuta is a nervous wreck from people staring at him. Luna finds him and he explains about being bad with large groups. Luna suddenly bites his neck, explaining she too is bad with people, so she needs him to keep practising on.
3	"Li'l Miss Vampire and the Sports Tournament"; Transliteration: "Kyūketsuki-chan to Kyūgisai" (Japanese: 吸血鬼ちゃんと球技祭)	Neil Lamadrid & Jake Marquez	Tani Haruhi	Yasuo Ejima	October 26, 2025
3	"Li'l Miss Vampire and the Club Search"; Transliteration: "Kyūketsuki-chan to Bukatsu Tanbō" (Japanese: 吸血鬼ちゃんと部活探訪)	Neil Lamadrid & Jake Marquez	Tani Haruhi	Yasuo Ejima	October 26, 2025
During sports festival Luna proves a skilled basketball player, but only for a few minutes before exhaustion leaves her starving. Tatsuta rushes to feed her but she is too tired to do it properly, so he has her bite one of his existing wounds. She returns to normal and helps win the match. They are declared heroes of their class, but Luna quickly becomes hungry again, making everyone think she is adorable. Luna decides to join any club that lets her practice sucking blood after school. They try Theatre, Occult Research, Karuta, Radio, Photography, Wall-climbing, Tennis, Kendo, Modern Slang and Volleyball. Sakuma turns out to be on the volleyball team and asks for help as they keep accidentally breaking things and the Principal is threatening to disband the team. Working from a volleyball light novel Luna helps train them to play properly, though the effort required leaves Tatsuta faint from blood loss. Luna decides the ideal club for her would be in a dark room with only a few members, on the second floor in a corner room with heating and air conditioning. Tatsuta realises the only club that qualifies is Art club, of which coincidentally he is the only member.
4	"Li'l Miss Vampire and Cooking Class"; Transliteration: "Kyūketsuki-chan to Chōri Jisshū" (Japanese: 吸血鬼ちゃんと調理実習)	Yuri Pinzon	Hitomi Ogawa	Ichizō Kobayashi	November 2, 2025
4	"Li'l Miss Vampire's Day Out"; Transliteration: "Kyūketsuki-chan to Odekake" (Japanese: 吸血鬼ちゃんとおでかけ)	Yuri Pinzon	Hitomi Ogawa	Ichizō Kobayashi	November 2, 2025
In cooking class Sakuma suggests Luna make cake for Tatsuta to show her appreciation. Their classmates discover Tatsuta and Luna are the only members of Art Club and spends hours alone together, leading to Tatsuta being thoroughly interrogated. Luna finishes the cake and gifts some to Tatsuta, who is thrilled. He later worries his blood tastes unpleasant to her so she was trying to make his blood taste sweeter with the sugar. Luna learns Udon broth from the Udon Prefecture is so good it is rumoured to be a blood substitute. She invites Tatsuta to a nearby udon restaurant in a shopping mall. Luna has so much fun in the mall she forgets the udon. Tatsuta thinks about improving his blood's flavour, starting with a tomato juice smoothie. Luna buys a pillow to practise biting then suddenly remembers the udon. At the restaurant Tatsuta realises Luna is researching blood substitutes and fears his blood isn't good enough for her anymore. Luna eats comical amounts of udon but concludes it isn't the same as blood after all and finishes the meal by biting Tatsuta.
5	"Li'l Miss Vampire and Kusunoki-san"; Transliteration: "Kyūketsuki-chan to Kusunoki-san" (Japanese: 吸血鬼ちゃんと楠木さん)	Yuri Pinzon & Elijah Ragas	Yuniko Ayana	Hidetoshi Namura	November 9, 2025
5	"Li'l Miss Vampire's Birthday"; Transliteration: "Kyūketsuki-chan no Tanjōbi" (Japanese: 吸血鬼ちゃんの誕生日)	Yuri Pinzon & Elijah Ragas	Yuniko Ayana	Hidetoshi Namura	November 9, 2025
Classmate Kusunoki offers to let Luna suck her blood, but can't stand the pain. Luna fears she hasn't really improved as a vampire. Eiko recalls meeting Kusunoki in middle school and bonding over their love of cats. Kusunoki insists Luna won't improve until they stop spoiling her. Luna apologizes for hurting her, so Kusunoki let's Luna bite her again, but still can't take the pain. Tatsuta decides to hold an art competition as proof the art club has achieved something. Luna fears she can't draw but Tatsuta insists it matters more about being seen taking part than winning. A thunderstorm arrives so Luna hides in Tatsuta's backpack so they can both fit under his umbrella. Tatsuta worries he is still spoiling her. The next day is Luna's birthday but when no one mentions it she worries she might have neglected to tell anyone when her birthday is. She is relieved when everyone surprises her with a party, since all the class birthdays are actually written on the noticeboard so no one is ever forgotten. Tatsuta loses the present he bought her, so Eiko and Kusunoki quickly tie a ribbon in his hair and give him to Luna as a gift instead before he found his actual gift for her which is a Clucky plush.
6	"Li'l Miss Vampire's Interview"; Transliteration: "Kyūketsuki-chan to Shuzai" (Japanese: 吸血鬼ちゃんと取材)	Elijah Ragas & Neil Lamadrid	Yuniko Ayana	Yukio Nishimoto	November 16, 2025
6	"Li'l Miss Vampire Visits Otori-kun"; Transliteration: "Kyūketsuki-chan to Ōtori-kunchi" (Japanese: 吸血鬼ちゃんと大鳥くん家)	Elijah Ragas & Neil Lamadrid	Yuniko Ayana	Yukio Nishimoto	November 16, 2025
A local newspaper decides to write an article on Luna. During the interview she learns she has become famous; not for her noble vampire persona, but for the embarrassing situations she keeps getting into. Director Kirimine, the local Guardian Deity, supports Luna through the interview. Sakuma starts a group chat for "Luna's Mama's" where herself, Tatsuta and Kusunoki can discuss Luna whenever they want. The reporters realise Vampires are invisible in photographs, so they use Luna's profile picture instead, a cake Tatsuta mad with her face hand drawn on it. Kirimine is glad Luna is no longer a shy introvert, as it was she that first suggested using a noble vampire persona to help her confidence. Luna worries about the art clubs competition. Tatsuta suggests travelling to different places for inspiration, but Luna admits due to her hunger she rarely travels as she always ends up looking for places to eat. Instead she asks to see Tatsuta's finished drawings he keeps at his house. Luna is surprised Tatsuta's family owns a speciality liquor shop. With his mother out on deliveries Tatsuta is left in charge of the shop. Luna is amazed by all his artwork, showing all the places he has visited. Tatsuta decides to take her on a trip one day, wherever she wants to go.
7	"Li'l Miss Vampire and Swimsuits"; Transliteration: "Kyūketsuki-chan to Mizugi" (Japanese: 吸血鬼ちゃんと水着)	Yuri Pinzon & Jake Marquez	Sumika Hayakawa	Itsuro Kawasaki	November 23, 2025
Luna, Tatsuta, Sakuma and Kusonoki decide the trip will be to the beach. Luna feels guilty as feeding every day has started to affect Tatsuta's health, despite his claims he is fine. Tatsuta must watch his parents' shop, so Luna takes Sakuma and Kusonoki to study in the art room where she admits to struggling with extreme hunger recently. The girls go swimsuit shopping where Sakuma and Kusonoki argue over whether Luna should have fun by showing more skin or cover up completely to avoid sun damage. Luna wanders off so they rush to find her and find her outside crying, scared they left without her. Luna eventually picks a swimsuit just as Tatsuta arrives; having guessed Luna would be hungry already. Tatsuta's mother is astonished he is going to the beach with a girl, and her excitement actually makes Tatsuta nervous for the trip. He feels reassured when he sees how eager Luna is to go, until their classmates overhear their plans and their trip quickly becomes a class beach party. On top of the usual beach toys Luna suddenly reveals she bought a boat big enough for everyone, though Kusonoki insists she returns it.
8	"Li'l Miss Vampire and the Beach"; Transliteration: "Kyūketsuki-chan to Umi" (Japanese: 吸血鬼ちゃんと海)	Yuri Pinzon & Jake Marquez	Hitomi Ogawa	Sayaka Yamai	November 30, 2025
At the beach Luna wears the more revealing bikini but is hit by a rogue wave; running water and salt, both highly damaging to vampire skin. The wave also steals her sun hat, so Chiba and Deguchi race to get it back before she experiences sunburn. Luna tries to go wading but sinks instantly, as does Tatsuta who can't swim. Tatsuta's uncle, who owns a beach café, makes lunch for everyone and Luna tries shaved ice for the first time. For the rest of the day the class are busy building sandcastles, smashing watermelons and shell collecting before watching the sunset. While playing with fireworks Luna notices Tatsuta sitting alone. He admits he hasn't played with fireworks in years. Luna is suddenly inspired for her art competition. At school Luna shows off her drawing of fireworks over the ocean for the competition. Tatsuta declines to enter the competition but does show Luna something he drew for her, a lifelike landscape of everyone at the beach. Luna is touched since vampires are invisible in photographs so she has never seen herself like that before. She decides she wants to visit even more places so Tatsuta can draw more pictures.
9	"Li'l Miss Vampire and the Start of Summer Vacation"; Transliteration: "Kyūketsuki-chan to Natsuyasumi Kaishi" (Japanese: 吸血鬼ちゃんと夏休み開始)	Elijah Ragas & Neil Lamadrid	Tani Haruhi	Yukio Nishimoto	December 7, 2025
Summer begins but most people still attend school to prepare for summer festival. Tatsuta explains first years run the games and second years the food stalls. Individual clubs also put on club demonstrations, which means he and Luna will need to come up with a demonstration for Art club. Unfortunately, the air conditioning is turned off for maintenance and everyone suffers in the heat, especially Luna. Science Club helps by using liquid nitrogen to make ice creams. Tatsuta and Luna's class decide to put on a maid café. Tatsuta, Luna, Sakuma and Kusonoki are put in charge of sewing the outfits. Director Kirimine is glad Luna is fitting in, since when she first transferred she was timid and quiet. She is also glad Tatsuta is an excellent caretaker for Luna. As an artist Tatsuta is swamped with requests for painting signs, posters and decorating stalls but Luna is upset wherever she tries to help people insist on spoiling her instead. She complains at Tatsuta about overworking himself and demands he let her help, which he accepts. Luna donates her family tableware for the café and everyone is surprised her house turns out to be totally normal, until Luna demonstrates the house is just a lift shaft leading to her real home which is deep underground.
10	"Li'l Miss Vampire and the School Festival"; Transliteration: "Kyūketsuki-chan to Bunkasai" (Japanese: 吸血鬼ちゃんと文化祭)	Yuri Pinzon & Jake Marquez	Tani Haruhi	Ichizō Kobayashi	December 14, 2025
Everyone is impressed Luna's home is just a typical Japanese house, albeit underground. Luna disappears for a long time and everyone correctly guesses she has gotten lost in her own home. A ghost hiding under the table suddenly scares them into leaving early, confusing Luna as they left without taking all the tableware. Luna discovers the ghost was actually her socially awkward mother Shirayuri. That night she telephones her husband, Ryuzaburo, to remind him about Luna's festival, but he is busy with work and can't attend. The festival begins and the maid café is a success, with Luna turning out to excel at advertising even without trying. Kirimine is surprised at how many people attend and gives credit to Otori for painting the giant, attention catching sign over the school gate. Kirimine visits the café with Shirayuri who needed her help avoiding the sun to get there. Shirayuri tries to thank Otori for always helping Luna, but her socially awkward face comes across as terrifying. Shirayuri summons the family artists who, since vampires don't appear in photographs, paint commemorative portraits of everyone instead. The festival ends with an award ceremony with Luna in a vampire costume showering the audience with sweets. Otori falls asleep from donating blood, so Luna looks after him. Later, everyone finds it cute Otori and Luna fell asleep together in the art room.
11	"Li'l Miss Vampire and the After-Party"; Transliteration: "Kyūketsuki-chan to Hanseikai" (Japanese: 吸血鬼ちゃんと反省会)	Ryūta Yamamoto	Sumika Hayakawa	Yukio Nishimoto	December 21, 2025
11	"Li'l Miss Vampire's Surprise Plan"; Transliteration: "Kyūketsuki-chan no Sapuraizu Keikaku" (Japanese: 吸血鬼ちゃんのサプライズ計画)	Ryūta Yamamoto	Sumika Hayakawa	Yukio Nishimoto	December 21, 2025
The class rents out an Okonomiyaki restaurant to celebrate and Luna manages to cook one by herself despite Otori worrying. Luna and Sakuma visit a cat café and Kusonoki is embarrassed to admit she goes to one all the time. The cats bully Luna, so Sakuma lets her bite her arm to feel better. It bothers Kusonoki she isn't as close to Luna as Sakuma because she finds donating blood too painful. Kusonoki realises she doesn't mind when the cats bite her, so she decides to dress Luna as a kitten. Unfortunately, being bitten by Luna still hurts too much. Otori's birthday approaches and Luna decides on a surprise party but accidentally tells Otori about it. They make the bizarre decision to avoid each other until the party so they can pretend he doesn't know about it. The plan fails as they miss each other to the point their classmates start to worry about their health, with Otori turning deathly pale despite not donating blood, and Luna binging snacks constantly. Sakuma picks Luna up and puts her in Otori's lap, causing them to recover almost instantly. Luna invites Otori to the party at her house anyway, since the surprise part is already over. Everyone is shocked when Shirayuri informs them Luna's father Ryuzaburo will be at the party.
12	"Li'l Miss Vampire's Present"; Transliteration: "Kyūketsuki-chan no Purezento" (Japanese: 吸血鬼ちゃんのプレゼント)	Yuri Pinzon	Yuniko Ayana	Sayaka Yamai	December 28, 2025
Sakuma and Kusonoki help Luna prepare the party. Otori fears being the centre of attention but goes along with it for Luna, even managing to give a speech. He and Luna reminisce about how things have changed since they met. Ryuzaburo is late, but this only makes Otori more nervous to meet him. Among the gifts he receives Shirayuri gifts him a portrait she had made of when he and Luna fell asleep in the art room. Ryuzaburo suddenly appears in a chibi form similar to Luna's, having been hiding in a pile of teddy bears since the start of the party but never finding an opportunity to reveal himself until now. He is pleased to see how much Luna has grown since he last saw her, and how many friends she has made. He also credits Otori with changing vampire society forever, since in the past they only made formal portraits, but thanks to Otori they have recognised the value of portraits showing everyday life like a photograph, for which Otori will be remembered forever. For a final present Luna takes Otori flying over the city and shares that she has decided to become an artist and will need Otori to keep teaching her. Luna suddenly grows weak from the extended flight and they start to fall. Luckily Principal Kirimine, having guessed this would happen, was waiting to catch them with her Guardian Deity magic.
