= Space Invaders Get Even =

2008 video game

- Developers: Taito; Cattle Call
- Publishers: JP: Taito; WW: Square Enix
- Director: Yuichi Tanzawa
- Producer: Hiroshi Aoki
- Designers: Hiroshi Aoki; Yuichi Tanzawa
- Programmers: Tomoyuki Uno; Sakura Ruri; Miki Hayao; Hirotoshi Kuwabara
- Artists: Makoto Saitoh; Shūgo Takayama
- Composers: Takafumi Wada; Atsuhiro Motoyama; Hirotaka Kikuchi
- Series: Space Invaders
- Platform: Wii
- Release: JP: August 26, 2008; PAL: November 7, 2008; NA: December 1, 2008
- Genres: Real-time strategy Shoot 'em up
- Mode: Single-player

Space Invaders Get Even (Note: Japanese: スペースインベーダーゲットイーヴン ～逆襲のスペースインベーダー～, Hepburn: Supēsu Inbēdā Getto Īvun ~Gyakushū no Supēsu Inbēdā; lit. Space Invaders Get Even: The Counterattacking Space Invaders) is a video game by Taito for the Wii. Originally intended as a retail release, the game was released as a downloadable WiiWare game instead. It was released in Japan on August 26, 2008, in Europe and Australia on November 7, 2008, and in North America on December 1, 2008. Outside Japan the game is published by Square Enix.

The game costs 500 Nintendo Points. However, only one stage (consisting of two levels and a boss battle), dubbed the "Starter Pack" is initially available. The game's six additional stages must be purchased separately as three downloadable content packs, also priced at 500 Points each. As a result, the complete game costs a total of 2000 Nintendo Points.

== Gameplay ==
The origins of the game lie with the original classic arcade game Space Invaders. However, Space Invaders Get Even puts a twist on the formula by letting the player control the space invaders themselves.

Breaking away from the gameplay of the original game and its spin-offs, Space Invaders Get Even sees players piloting the invader's UFO across a landscape rendered in 3D graphics, which encompasses areas such as cities, deserts, forests, oceans and military bases. By downloading the extra stages, players are also given the option to swap out the UFO in the game with ships from the Darius and RayForce series of Taito shoot 'em ups, as well as a polygonal version of the "classic" UFO from Space Invaders.

Players move the UFO with the analog stick of the Nunchuk, and then use the pointer function of the Wii Remote to direct a swarm of up to 100 invaders in blowing up buildings and destroying the defending forces of Earth, with continuing destruction increasing the time available to the player. The invaders, which are rendered as flat, glowing two dimensional sprites which resemble the invaders in the original game, can utilize a number of attack formations to dispatch enemies, including forming a drill-like formation to bore into them or crushing them by bouncing on top of them from above. Over time, human forces will shoot down the player's invader troops, which the player replenishes by shaking the Wiimote. Upon eliminating all opposition in the stage, which includes fighter jets, helicopter gunships and gunboats, the player must then take on a large boss, which include a giant tank, mecha and a huge battleship. The final battle of the game is against the original UFO that crashed on Earth 30 years ago during the first invasion, upgraded and modified by the earthlings.

The game also features online leaderboards.

== Reception ==
Reception

Aggregate score
Aggregator	Score
Metacritic	68/100

Wired's Chris Kohler found the gameplay in the Starter Pack to be "addictive and well-balanced", yet lamented that making the rest of the stages available only as paid downloadable content was like "the modern-day equivalent of Insert Coin To Continue". Nintendo Life, which gave it an 8/10, called it "a wonderful new take on the franchise", though they also believed that players may be put off by both having to purchase the additional stages and needing to free up the amount of internal memory (approximately 700 blocks) required for the game and its additional content.

These sentiments were also echoed by 1UP.com, who gave the game a B− grade and called the gameplay a "high concentration of amusing (and plain ol' fun)" action. IGN gave it a 5.9/10, praising the gameplay and the game's humor, but could not justify the cost of purchasing the whole package.
