= Merman in My Tub =

Japanese manga and anime series

- Cover of the first manga volume.

オレん家のフロ事情
- Genre: Comedy, slice of life
- Manga
- Written by: Itokichi
- Published by: Media Factory
- English publisher: NA: Seven Seas Entertainment
- Magazine: Monthly Comic Gene
- Original run: 2011 – 2020
- Volumes: 8
- Anime television series
- Directed by: Sayo Aoi
- Written by: Yuniko Ayana
- Music by: Hiromi Mizutani
- Studio: Asahi Production
- Licensed by: NA: Crunchyroll; SA/SEA: Medialink
- Original network: BS11
- Original run: October 6, 2014 – December 29, 2014
- Episodes: 13
- Television drama

49 Days With a Merman
- Directed by: Hsi-ming Chang
- Original network: KKTV
- Original run: February 6, 2022 – March 13, 2022
- Episodes: 14

Merman in My Tub (Japanese: オレん家のフロ事情, Hepburn: Orenchi no Furo Jijō; lit. "The Circumstances in My Home's Bathtub") is a Japanese four-panel manga series written and illustrated by Itokichi. It has been serialized in Media Factory's Monthly Comic Gene magazine since 2011 and the chapters have collected into eight tankōbon volumes. An anime television series adaptation by Asahi Production aired from October to December 2014.

== Plot ==
The four-panel manga begins with Tatsumi, a high-school boy who lives by himself. Then, a devastatingly handsome merman named Wakasa moves into the bathtub in Tatsumi's home. Wakasa is a bit self-centered but cute, while Tatsumi is cool but a busybody. The manga offers a peek into their lives together.

== Characters ==
Tatsumi (龍己)
Voiced by: Nobunaga Shimazaki
Tatsumi is a high school student who found Wakasa drying out by a river and took him in, thinking he was hurt. He was shocked to find out he was a merman, but decided to let him stay in his bathtub. While usually cool and shy, he's gotten used to living with Wakasa and all his other friends.
Wakasa (若狭)
Voiced by: Yūichirō Umehara
Wakasa is a merman, who was originally living in a heavily polluted river by the upstream dam. As it became too troublesome to live in that area, since rumors about mermaid sighting had started to go around, he decided he had to leave this place and was soon found stranded by Tatsumi, who invited him to live in his comfortable, clean bathroom.
Takasu (鷹巣)
Voiced by: Tatsuhisa Suzuki
Takasu is an octopus merman who likes to check on Wakasa, and the two of them seem to have been friends from before Tatsumi met Wakasa. Takasu likes climbing into small spaces like Tatsumi's washing machine.
Kasumi (霞)
Voiced by: Ibuki Kido
Tatsumi's little sister. She loves her brother a lot and considers Wakasa her rival for Tatsumi's affection.
Mikuni (三国)
Voiced by: Natsuki Hanae
A jellyfish merman who can split himself into many smaller versions and administer electric shocks. He has an easygoing personality and has wanderlust so he tends to move around a lot.
Maki (真木)
Voiced by: Kenjiro Tsuda
Maki is a sea snail merman who Tatsumi saved from some bullying children. Maki normally has a self-deprecating, negative personality, but a little kindness brings out a bright, happy snail from his (literal and figurative) shell.
Agari (安賀里)
Agari is a big shark merman rumored to be the model for the movie Jaws. He is referred to as "senpai" (an older person, usually of higher rank or just deeply respected by the person using this term) by Wakasa because sharks are the top among the fish. Although Agari looks scary, he is actually rather shy. He hides underneath the water with only his fin visible because he is too nervous to speak, mainly because he often ends up scaring people when he opens his mouth and flashes his many sharp teeth. Therefore, he uses body language to communicate instead.
Gorōmaru (五郎丸)
A starfish merman, who is a younger acquaintance of Wakasa. He likes children and has a really sticky body.
Sōsuke (聡介, Sōsuke)
A friend and classmate of Tatsumi. He does not know that his friend is living with a merman.
Duck-chan (アヒルちゃん, Ahiru-chan)
Voiced by: Yoshihisa Kawahara
A rubber duck that stands in the bathroom of Tatsumi's home. It also serves as a narrator role in the anime.

== Media ==
=== Manga ===
The individual chapters were collected into eight tankōbon volumes published by Kadokawa Shoten.

==== Volume list ====
No.	Original release date	Original ISBN	English release date	English ISBN
1	March 27, 2012	978-4-8401-4448-3	October 13, 2015	978-1-6269-2226-6
Chapters 1-15
2	October 27, 2012	978-4-8401-4745-3	January 5, 2016	978-1-6269-2237-2
Chapters 16-30
3	May 27, 2013	978-4-8401-5065-1	April 12, 2016	978-1-6269-2258-7
Chapters 31-45
4	May 27, 2014	978-4-0406-6553-5	August 23, 2016	978-1-6269-2290-7
Chapters 46-58
5	September 27, 2014	978-4-0406-6864-2	November 22, 2016	978-1-6269-2356-0
Chapters 59-73
6	October 27, 2015	978-4-0406-7833-7	March 21, 2017	978-1-6269-2436-9
Chapters 74-86
7	August 26, 2017	978-4-0406-8583-0	May 29, 2018	978-1-6269-2502-1
Chapters 87-99
8	February 27, 2020	978-4-0406-4350-2	June 29, 2021	978-1-6269-2579-3
Chapters 100-?

=== Anime ===
An anime television series adaptation by Asahi Production aired from October 6 to December 29, 2014. The series is directed by Sayo Aoi and written by Yuniko Ayana, with character designs by Koji Haneda. The series was obtained by Crunchyroll for streaming in North America and other select parts of the world. Medialink licensed the series in Asia-Pacific. The opening theme is "Chimeishō" (致命傷; lit. Fatal Wound) by Matenrou Opera.

==== Episode list ====
No.	Title	Original release date
1	"The Special Circumstances of My Bathtub" "Uchi no Furo no Tokushuna Jijō" (ウチのフロの特殊な事情)	October 6, 2014
The story starts with Tatsumi, a young man, returning to his home, where he is greeted by the merman Wakasa, who lives in his bathtub. The latter is given a bath mix, which would make it possible to turn the bath water pink, something the merman has always dreamed of. Meanwhile, Tatsumi reminisces about their first meeting and how he had taken him to his home, after he found the powerless merman stranded next to a river, although he only came to realize that he was a merman some time afterwards. Wakasa then starts to talk about his life around the upstream dam, which had recently gotten a little difficult. As he says how impudent humans are, Tatsumi silently thinks about all the impudent requests Wakasa already asked of him during his time living there. Following, he states that he would like to take a bath as well soon, but as he tries to switch places with Wakasa, the other starts complaining as he would dry out without water, resulting in the two of them taking a bath together. During their bath, Tatsumi asks Wakasa when he planned to leave again, to which the merman responds that he would prefer to stay because the river water was filthy. Being the nice person he is, Tatsumi gives in and lets him stay at his place.
2	"The Dire Circumstances of My Home Finances" "Orenchi no Setsujitsuna Kakei Jijō" (オレん家の切実な家計事情)	October 13, 2014
Providing Wakasa with food and shelter is straining Tatsumi's budget, so he tries to come up with ways to save money.
3	"The Circumstances of Wakasa's Friends: Takasu Chapter" "Wakasa no Tomodachi Jijō Takasu-hen" (若狭のトモダチ事情・鷹巣編)	October 20, 2014
Wakasa's friend Takasu the octopus handyman comes to stay at Tatsumi's house too. Takasu takes up even more space and food and causes trouble by breaking Wakasa's mini television, though he is able to fix it afterward. When Tatsumi finally tells Takasu to leave, Takasu gropes Tatsumi with his tentacles, which turns out to be just a massage. In the end it turns out that Wakasa had invited Takasu over to give Tatsumi a massage as thanks for Tatsumi's hospitality.
4	"The Circumstances of Wakasa's Friends: Mikuni Chapter" "Wakasa no Tomodachi Jijō Mikuni-hen" (若狭のトモダチ事情・三国編)	October 27, 2014
Tatsumi tells Wakasa and Takasu about a "ghost" he met in the park, only to discover that the ghost has followed him home, and is not truly a ghost but a spacey jellyfish named Mikuni. Tatsumi is charmed by Mikuni's beauty and humility, and is surprised when unlike Wakasa and Takasu all Mikuni needs is water. After Mikuni returns to wandering, Wakasa and Takasu express jealousy over Mikuni's preferential treatment and both try to offer themselves up as food as compensation for mooching. Later, Wakasa and Takasu discuss that Tatsumi still does not know what Mikuni is "really like".
5	"The Circumstances of Halloween at My House" "Orenchi no Harowin Jijō" (オレん家のハロウィン事情)	November 3, 2014
Wakasa, Takasu, and Mikuni dress up for Halloween and try to drag Tatsumi into their celebrations. They succeed in getting Tatsumi to decorate and give them candy, but upon realizing that he doesn't intend to go trick-or-treating himself, they have him trick-or-treat from them with the candy he's just given them because he is the youngest present.
6	"The Circumstances of My Bubbles" "Orenchi no Awa Jijō" (オレん家の泡事情)	November 10, 2014
Tatsumi makes up a bubble bath for Wakasa, who has always wanted to try one. Though Tatsumi initially has no intention of joining in because he thinks that bubble baths are "too girly", Wakasa insists, and they wind up playing in the bathtub until all the bubbles are gone. Later, Wakasa tries to use bubble bath powder on his own and ends up making a mess.
7	"My Little Sister's and My Circumstances" "Orenchi no Kyōdai Jijō" (オレん家の兄妹事情)	November 17, 2014
Tatsumi's young sister Kasumi comes over to visit, and he fails to hide Wakasa from her. Kasumi initially assumes that he is her brother's human girlfriend here to take him away from her, but Tatsumi and Wakasa explain the truth to her. Tatsumi gets Kasumi's word of honor that she will not tell other people about Wakasa by promising that he will do whatever she says during her next visit. During the credits, Wakasa and Mr. Duckie see Kasumi sniffing her brother's clothes.
8	"The Circumstances of Popular Trends in Today's Male Youth" "Imadoki Danshi no Hayari Jijō" (いまどき男子の流行事情)	November 24, 2014
Wakasa tries to get out of eating his vegetables by protesting that being a carnivore is trendier, having read and misunderstood the slang term (carnivore = sexually aggressive person) in a magazine. After this fails to dissuade Tatsumi, Wakasa claims to have gotten sick eating vegetables once before, but forces himself to eat them after Tatsumi leaves the bathroom. When Wakasa claims that he's confident in his health and strength, balanced diet or no, Tatsumi challenges him to an arm-wrestling match to prove it.
9	"The Circumstances of Our Naked Bonding" "Hadaka no Otsukiai Jijō" (ハダカのお付き合い事情)	December 1, 2014
Kasumi comes over to visit while Tatsumi is changing the bathwater and demands to take a bath together with her brother. Tatsumi initially refuses because he does not like having Wakasa see his sister naked, but Wakasa persuades him to accept. Kasumi and Tatsumi try blindfolding Wakasa to protect Kasumi's privacy, but Wakasa insists on joining in because it sounds like the siblings are having fun and he feels left out. Kasumi and Wakasa make friends over their shared taste in bathing products, and during the credits, Kasumi persuades Wakasa to send photos of Tatsumi to her by promising to pay him with his favorite shampoo.
10	"The Circumstances of Wakasa's Friends: Maki Chapter" "Wakasa no Tomodachi Jijō: Maki-hen" (若狭のトモダチ事情・真木編)	December 8, 2014
Tatsumi rescues a river snail from a pair of young boys. The snail turns out to be Maki, another of Wakasa's friends. Maki is negative, self-deprecating, and careless, but impresses Tatsumi by cleaning the bathtub.
11	"The Seven Transformations of My Bathtub Circumstances" "Orenchi no Furo Jijō: Nana Henka" (オレん家のフロ事情☆七変化)	December 15, 2014
Tatsumi gets a raise from his boss and tells Wakasa that he can request something he likes, even if it's a little extravagant. Wakasa decides to try a milk bath, and his friends all appear with various potables they would like to bathe in: Mikuni with coffee, tea, and Aquari; Maki with orange juice; and Takasu with wine, beer, and sake. Tatsumi (who himself is underage) protests the last for fear of underage viewers getting ideas, but is beaten down by the others, who are all adults. During the sake bath Tatsumi becomes unable to handle the alcohol fumes and passes out, and Wakasa and company air out the room and change out the bath water for him. During the credits, being packed into the bath with so many sea creatures gives Tatsumi the idea to make seafood hotpot for dinner.
12	"Wakasa's Home Alone Circumstances" "Wakasa no Orusubuan Jijō" (若狭のおるすばん事情)	December 22, 2014
Wakasa gets nervous when Tatsumi is late coming home and gets out of the tub to look around the house, causing a mess and nearly drying out. When Tatsumi comes home, he thanks Wakasa for worrying about him, but makes him promise not to get out of the tub next time, or else he won't give Wakasa the cake he brought with him.
13	"The Circumstances of Wakasa's Job" "Wakasa no Oshigoto Jijō" (若狭のおしごと事情)	December 29, 2014
Wakasa worries that Tatsumi may kick him out after watching a man complaining about his partner's moocher tendencies on TV, and asks Tatsumi to help him find a job. Because Wakasa has nothing to put on a resume, Tatsumi recommends that he enter by-mail sweepstakes, but Wakasa is unable to write kanji and Tatsumi must teach him. Wakasa fills out stacks of postcards, but is shocked that he will not get to see the contest results for a month. Tatsumi reassures Wakasa that he doesn't have to worry about being kicked out, because they are friends. Wakasa mainly enters contests to win free meat, but what he receives at the end of the month is a scarf, which he had been aiming for to give to Tatsumi. During the credits, Wakasa's friends come over for a New Year's party, and Kasumi also has a brief appearance wishing her brother a happy new year from her own house.

=== Television drama ===
A 14-episode live-action television series adaptation titled 49 Days With a Merman premiered February 6, 2022, on KKTV Taiwan streaming service. It was the first self-produced drama by MediaLink. The series was directed by Hsi-ming Chang, and stars Bruce Hung, Kent Tsai and Liu Chu-Ping.
