= Girls Beyond the Wasteland =

2016 video game and its franchise

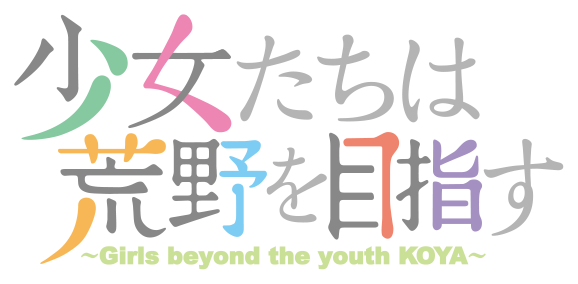

少女たちは荒野を目指す (Shōjo-tachi wa Kōya o Mezasu)
- Genre: Drama, romance
- Anime television series
- Directed by: Takuya Satō
- Produced by: Nobuhiro Nakayama; Yōsuke Wada; Takema Okamura; Jun Fukuda; Satoshi Fukao; Toshiyasu Hayashi; Takahiro Imaizumi; Yasuo Saitō; Ryūtarō Usukura
- Written by: Yuniko Ayana
- Music by: Takeshi Watanabe; GoKoY
- Studio: Project No.9
- Licensed by: AUS: Madman; NA: Sentai Filmworks; UK: MVM Films
- Original network: Tokyo MX, BS11, MBS, AT-X
- English network: US: Anime Network
- Original run: January 7, 2016 – March 24, 2016
- Episodes: 12 + OVA
- Manga

Shōjo-tachi wa Kōya o Mezasu: Tori Naku Uta
- Written by: Minato Soft
- Illustrated by: Kazuchi
- Published by: ASCII Media Works
- Magazine: Dengeki G's Comic
- Original run: February 29, 2016 – September 30, 2017
- Volumes: 3
- Video game
- Developer: Minato Soft
- Publisher: Minato Soft
- Genre: Visual novel
- Platform: Windows
- Released: JP: March 25, 2016
- Manga

Shōjo-tachi wa Kōya o Mezasu: Yukidoke no Oto
- Written by: Minato Soft
- Illustrated by: Tsukune Taira
- Published by: ASCII Media Works
- Magazine: Dengeki G's Comic
- Original run: July 30, 2016 – May 30, 2018
- Volumes: 2

Girls Beyond the Wasteland (少女たちは荒野を目指す, Shōjo-tachi wa Kōya o Mezasu; lit. Girls aim for the wasteland), often abbreviated as Shokomeza (しょこめざ) and also known as Girls Beyond the Youth Koya in Japan, is a visual novel developed by Minato Soft, released for Windows on March 25, 2016, with a rating for all ages. An anime television series adaptation, produced by Project No.9 and directed by Takuya Satō, premiered in January 2016.

== Gameplay ==
Girls Beyond the Wasteland is a romance visual novel in which the player assumes the role of Buntarō Hōjō. Much of its gameplay is spent on reading the story's narrative and dialogue. The text in the game is accompanied by character sprites, which represent who Buntarō is talking to, over background art. Throughout the game, the player encounters CG artwork at certain points in the story, which take the place of the background art and character sprites. The game follows a branching plot line with multiple endings, and depending on the decisions that the player makes during the game, the plot will progress in a specific direction.

There are four main plot lines that the player will have the chance to experience, one for each heroine. Throughout gameplay, the player is given multiple options to choose from, and text progression pauses at these points until a choice is made. Some decisions can lead the game to end prematurely, which offer an alternative ending to the plot. To view all plot lines in their entirety, the player will have to replay the game multiple times and choose different choices to further the plot to an alternate direction.

== Characters ==
Buntarō Hōjō (北条 文太郎, Hōjō Buntarō)
Voiced by: Seiichiro Yamashita
Buntarō, nicknamed Bunta (ブンタ), is the protagonist. He is hardworking, friendly, and well-aware of his surroundings. He usually writes the scenarios for the drama club, although he writes based on an existing stories. He becomes the scenario writer for the game produced by Sayuki.
Sayuki Kuroda (黒田 砂雪, Kuroda Sayuki)
Voiced by: Haruka Chisuga
Sayuki is Buntarō's quiet classmate. She has been investigating Buntarō and convinces herself that he is fit to be scenario writer for her upcoming game. She wants to make a bishōjo game because she knows that this world is a "wasteland" where people are forced to do something they have no interest in so they can make money for living. She is inspired by her older brother who works for a game company. She loves Buntarō and kissed him in the 8th episode in the anime. She blushes really hard when Buntarō sees her in embarrassing situations or when he said something lovely to her. She goes with him on a date in the first episode in the anime. It's often hinted in the anime that she has strong feelings for Buntarō.
Yūka Kobayakawa (小早川 夕夏, Kobayakawa Yūka)
Voiced by: Kana Hanazawa
Yūka is Buntarō's childhood friend. She is an energetic girl who is good at acting. She is recruited to be the voice director of Sayuki's game and provides her own voice. She has feelings for Buntarō.
Teruha Andō (安東 テルハ, Andō Teruha)
Voiced by: Satomi Akesaka
Nicknamed Akkīna (アッキーナ), Teruha is another of Buntarō's classmate. She is the programmer, web designer, and script composition of the game. Despite working on a bishōjo game, Teruha is a heavy fujoshi, and views the characters as men so she can get the "feeling". Teruha's way of thinking is opposite to that of Sayuki, and she is not afraid to try new things, often getting in fights with Sayuki over ideas. Due to not getting permission from school, she is secretly working at a Maid Cafe and using an alter ego under the name of "Luka" (ルカ, Ruka). She also has feelings for Buntarō.
Uguisu Yūki (結城 うぐいす, Yūki Uguisu)
Voiced by: Satomi Satō
Uguisu is a first-year student, and the artist of the game. She is nicknamed Tori (トリ; "bird") because her name stands for Japanese bush warbler. Uguisu is shy and timid, and sometimes forgets to take care of herself due to her love on drawing. Her pen name is "Hokekiyo" (ホケキヨ) and her art often gets a high rank on Pixi.
Atomu Kai (甲斐 亜登夢, Kai Atomu)
Voiced by: Toshiyuki Toyonaga
Atomu is Buntarō's childhood friend. Along with Yūka, they are a trio who are always seen together. Atomu was dumped by his girlfriend for being "too nice", which makes him hate 3D girls and couples. He doesn't have any special talents, but has the motivation that Sayuki needs, which makes him the Assistant Director.

== Development and release ==
The planning for Girls Beyond the Wasteland was headed by Takahiro, with Romeo Tanaka writing the scenario. The art direction and character design was provided by Matsuryū. A demo was released on October 23, 2015. The game was released on March 25, 2016, for Windows.

The opening theme "Master Up" is sung by the voice cast of the main female characters: Haruka Chisuga, Kana Hanazawa, Satomi Satō and Satomi Akesaka.

== Adaptations ==
=== Anime ===
An anime television series adaptation, produced by Project No.9 and directed by Takuya Satō, premiered on January 7, 2016. The screenplay is written by Yuniko Ayana and Takayuki Noguchi based the character design used in the anime on Matsuryū's original designs. A Blu-ray Disc containing an original video animation episode will be bundled with an "Anime Edition" of the Windows game. The anime has been licensed by Sentai Filmworks in North America, Madman Entertainment in Australia and MVM Films in the United Kingdom.

The opening theme "Wastelanders" is by Sayaka Sasaki and the ending theme "Sekai wa Kyō mo Atarashii" (世界は今日もあたらしい; lit. 'The World Today is Also New') is sung by the voice cast of main female characters: Haruka Chisuga, Kana Hanazawa, Satomi Satō, and Satomi Akesaka.

==== Episodes ====
No.	Title	Original release date
1	"Girls Who Chase After Their Dreams"; Transliteration: "Yume o Ō Shōjo" (Japanese: 夢を追う少女)	January 7, 2016
2	"This is Another Spring of Youth"; Transliteration: "Kore mo Hitotsu no Aoi Haru" (Japanese: これもひとつの青い春)	January 14, 2016
3	"It's the First Time"; Transliteration: "Hajimete Nan da" (Japanese: はじめてなんだ)	January 21, 2016
4	"A Melody of Selfishness and Subtraction"; Transliteration: "Wagamama to Hikizan no Merodi" (Japanese: わがままと引き算のメロディ)	January 28, 2016
5	"What You Can See in the Storm"; Transliteration: "Arashi no naka de mieru no wa" (Japanese: 嵐の中で見えるのは)	February 4, 2016
6	"This is the So-Called Fanservice Episode"; Transliteration: "Kore ga iwayuru sābisu-kai to iu mono ne" (Japanese: これがいわゆるサービス回というものね)	February 11, 2016
7	"As Always, It's a Different You"; Transliteration: "Itsumo to onaji, chigau kimi" (Japanese: いつもと同じ、違うキミ)	February 18, 2016
8	"Shut Away in Summer"; Transliteration: "Tojikomerarete, natsu" (Japanese: 閉じ込められて、夏)	February 25, 2016
9	"Because I Love You"; Transliteration: "Sukidakara" (Japanese: 好きだから)	March 3, 2016
10	"Typhoon Attack"; Transliteration: "Taifūn shūrai" (Japanese: タイフーン襲来)	March 10, 2016
11	"This Might Be the Beginning"; Transliteration: "Kore ga hajimari kamo shirenai" (Japanese: これが始まりかもしれない)	March 17, 2016
12	"Girls Beyond the Wasteland"; Transliteration: "Shōjo-tachi wa kōya o mezasu" (Japanese: 少女たちは荒野を目指す)	March 24, 2016
OVA	"Should This Be Called...the Strategic Game Bundle Edition?"; Transliteration: "Senryakuteki Gēmu Bandoru-ban...to Iu Beki Mono Kashira" (Japanese: 戦略的ゲームバンドル版...と言うべきものかしら)	March 25, 2016

=== Manga ===
A manga adaptation with art by Kazuchi began serialization in ASCII Media Works' seinen manga magazine Dengeki G's Comic with the April 2016 issue released on February 29, 2016.
