= The Seven Deadly Sins: Signs of Holy War =

2016 Japanese anime TV series

- Season 1.5
- Cover for the second home media volume of the special

Release
- Original network: MBS, TBS
- Original release: August 28 – September 18, 2016

Season chronology
- ← Previous; Season 1 Next → Revival of The Commandments

The Seven Deadly Sins: Signs of Holy War (七つの大罪 聖戦の予兆, Nanatsu no Taizai: Seisen no Shirushi) is a four-part anime television special that features an original story written by Nakaba Suzuki, author of The Seven Deadly Sins manga series for which the anime is based on. The special anime was confirmed on September 27, 2015, and began airing on August 28, 2016, on MBS and TBS. The special was licensed by Netflix and released on the platform on February 17, 2017. The special was produced by A-1 Pictures, directed by Tomokazu Tokoro, and written by Yuniko Ayana and Yuichiro Kido, featuring character designs by Keigo Sasaki. The music was composed by Hiroyuki Sawano and Takafumi Wada. The opening theme song is "Classic" by Mucc and the ending theme song is "Iroasenai Hitomi" (色褪せない瞳) by Alisa Takigawa. A commercial following the final episode of the special confirmed a second season of the anime had been green-lit, which later aired in 2018 under the title The Seven Deadly Sins: Revival of The Commandments.

== Episodes ==
Story	Episode	Title (Note: English translated titles are taken from Netflix.)	Directed by (Note: Information is taken from the ending credits of each episode.)	Written by	Storyboarded by	Original release date
25	1	"The Dark Dream Begins"; Transliteration: "Kuroki Yume no Hajimari" (Japanese: 黒き夢のはじまり)	Tomokazu Tokoro	Yuniko Ayana	Tomokazu Tokoro	August 28, 2016
Elizabeth Liones goes to the Boar Hat, where all her friends are still asleep following the festival. After Elizabeth is greeted by Hawk outside, Meliodas introduces her to a meat pie he made with vegetables that looks like Hawk, but, as expected of his cooking, it turns out to be unfit for human consumption. Meliodas has the idea of using pork as the main ingredient, which causes Hawk to make haste out of the bar. Meliodas comes up with a contest for his friends, in which he will obey any order for a day from whoever catches Hawk first. However, Hawk manages to outsmart them due to his small size. Hawk returns to the Boar Hat and eats food scraps made by Ban. Nonetheless, Meliodas cheats everyone by officially capturing Hawk, and is declared the winner as a result. At night, Meliodas takes Elizabeth back to the palace while also assuring that his purpose in life is to protect her. Meliodas then goes to the catacombs to see the Horn of Cernunnos, intent on figuring out the reason behind Ban's attempt to kill him during the battle. When the goddess vessel taunts him for his reputation as a demon, Meliodas destroys the Horn of Cernunnos in retaliation.
26	2	"Our Fighting Festival"; Transliteration: "Futari no Kenka Matsuri" (Japanese: 二人の喧嘩祭り)	Shigeru Ueda	Yuichiro Kido	Shigeru Ueda	September 4, 2016
Ban walks up to a mountaintop to finally settle matters with Meliodas, but the former is surprised to see Elizabeth and Hawk as well as the other members of the Seven Deadly Sins and the Holy Knights as part of an audience. Merlin casts a gigantic cubic barrier around Meliodas and Ban in order for the spectators to safely watch the fight. Meanwhile, King and Howzer have their own fight to win the attention of Diane; while King easily loses, he wins Diane's attention. Ban initiates his Hunter Fest skill to use the spectators' combined strength as his own, urging Meliodas to use his demonic power to fight at equal footing. The fight ends in a stalemate after the two of them exchange rapid punches that cause the barrier to break. Afterward, the tired friends head back down to the Boar Hat for a drink.
27	3	"In Pursuit of First Love"; Transliteration: "Hatsukoi wo Oikakete" (Japanese: 初恋を追いかけて)	Toshimasa Ishii	Yuniko Ayana	Toshimasa Ishii	September 11, 2016
King still hesitates to confess his feelings for Diane. Meanwhile, Diane leaves the Boar Hat and heads to a construction site in town, recalling the devastating collateral damage she caused due to her immense size. The construction workers there apologize to her and thank her for saving the kingdom. When King comes to see Diane, the two spend the day roaming the town before they decide to play a game of tag. Outside a church, a wedding ceremony is interrupted by a remaining New Generation mutant, in which Diane and King combine their skills in defeating the demon. King asks Diane if she regained her memories, and she answers him with a kiss on his cheek. The moment is ruined when a brick suddenly falls on his head, and he later wakes up next to her, having forgotten what they did during the day.
28	4	"The Shape of Love"; Transliteration: "Ai no Katachi" (Japanese: 愛のかたち)	Tsuyoshi Tobita	Yuniko Ayana	Yoshikazu Miyao	September 18, 2016
With business tanking at the Boar Hat, Meliodas asks Merlin to join Elizabeth and Diane as a waitress there. Merlin agrees, but on the condition that Meliodas and Gowther must follow Gilthunder to find out if he is being stalked by someone. Meanwhile, Gilthunder, Howzer and Griamore are each hit with falling debris in the streets, with Gilthunder unharmed and confused of the situation. Gowther is distracted by a boy named Pelio, who asks him to retrieve a fat cat off a roof. Since Gowther reminds Pelio of his mother, who recently died, Gowther transforms into her for a moment and disappears when Pelio's father finds him. Meliodas finds Gilthunder, Howzer and Griamore at a restaurant, where he purposely spills some tea to expose Vivian, revealed as the stalker. After Meliodas easily defeats Vivian by using Full Counter with a nearby spoon, Merlin punishes her by planting a cursed ring on her finger, which will bring pain to her each time she comes close to Gilthunder, and Merlin explains that the Ten Commandments are the highest class in the demon race. At the Boar Hat, upon Meliodas mentioning using the girls for a series of crude publicity stunts, Merlin quits, while Hawk and Gowther fill in for the position, much to the guys' dismay.

== Home media release ==
=== Japanese ===
Aniplex (Japan – Region 2/A)
Volume	Episodes	Release date	Ref.
1	1–2	January 11, 2017	
2	3–4	February 8, 2017	
