= The Idolmaster SideM =

2017 multimedia male idol series by Bandai Namco

- Promotional art for the anime

アイドルマスター サイドエム (Aidorumasutā Saido Emu)
- Video game
- Developer: Alt Plus Inc.
- Publisher: Bandai Namco Entertainment
- Genre: Simulation, Social network game
- Platform: Mobage (iOS, Android, Google Chrome)
- Released: JP: February 28, 2014; (reopened: July 17, 2014)
- Anime television series
- Directed by: Miyuki Kuroki; Takahiro Harada
- Written by: Yuniko Ayana; Yukie Sugahara
- Music by: Effy
- Studio: A-1 Pictures
- Licensed by: Crunchyroll (streaming)
- Original network: Tokyo MX, Tochigi TV, Gunma TV, BS11, ABC, Mētele, AT-X
- Original run: October 7, 2017 – December 30, 2017
- Episodes: 13 + special
- Video game

The Idolmaster SideM LIVE ON ST@GE!
- Developer: Akatsuki
- Publisher: Bandai Namco Entertainment
- Genre: Simulation, Rhythm Game, Social network game
- Platform: iOS, Android
- Released: JP: August 30, 2017
- Anime television series

The Idolmaster SideM Wake Atte Mini!
- Directed by: Mankyū
- Written by: Sumeragi
- Music by: Effy
- Studio: Zero-G
- Original network: Tokyo MX, BS11
- Original run: October 9, 2018 – December 25, 2018
- Episodes: 12 + 3 OVAs
- Video game

The Idolmaster SideM GROWING STARS
- Developer: Bandai Namco Studios
- Publisher: Bandai Namco Entertainment
- Genre: Simulation, Rhythm Game
- Platform: iOS, Android
- Released: JP: October 6, 2021

The Idolmaster SideM (Japanese: アイドルマスター SideM, Hepburn: Aidorumasutā Saido Emu; stylized as THE iDOLM@STER SideM) is a Japanese multimedia spin-off series of The Idolmaster, starting with a 2014 game and expanding to include music CDs, two anime series, a web radio show, printed manga, and a rhythm game. The series focuses on the male idols of 315 Production, in contrast with the normally female idol centric series.

The original game was published by Bandai Namco Entertainment and developed by Alt Plus Inc. was released on the Mobage platform in 2014. and is a male idol raising simulation game. A second game, a rhythm game developed by Akatsuki, was released in August 2017. An anime adaptation by A-1 Pictures aired between October and December 2017, and a second chibi slice of life anime adaptation of a manga, animated by Zero-G, aired from October to December 2018.

On October 6, 2021, THE iDOLM@STER SideM GROWING STARS, a spinoff rhythm game, was released for Android and iOS. On April 4, 2023, Bandai Namco announced that the game will end its service on July 31, 2023.

On November 4, 2022, Bandai Namco announced that the Mobage game will end its service on January 5, 2023.

== Overview ==
The series follows the male idols and the producer and staff of 315 Production (315プロ, Saiko Production) and their activities as idols, including concerts, events, and stage productions. The idols are grouped into set units, although they are not limited to working within these groups.

Some of the idols are from other series; the Jupiter trio from Idolmaster and Ryo Akizuki from Dearly Stars.

== Gameplay ==
=== Mobile game ===
The game is a free-to-play raising simulation in which the player, as the producer, collects idols and completes work tasks. In the games, the idols are individually categorized into one of three attributes: physical, Intelligent, and Mental. Idols are collected through cards that are ranked by rarity, strengthened through lessons, and do work for resources. Idols can 'battle' other idols in auditions, live concerts, and in battles against other players.

The game also contains a mini-game called SideMini, in which miniature versions of the idols bring the player items.

Within the game exists manga about the idols in the form of 'magazines' that can be unlocked via gameplay items.

The game originally opened on February 28, 2014, but due to difficulties arising from an unexpectedly large number of players, the game was closed a day later and reopened five months later on July 17, 2014.

A version for feature phones was available from launch until June 7, 2016. Around the same time, a Chrome app version was released on May 4.

The mobile game was shut down on January 5, 2023.

=== Live on Stage ===
A 3D model rhythm game titled The Idolmaster SideM: Live on Stage was released August 30, 2018, for Android and iOS platforms.

=== Growing Stars ===
A rhythm game titled The Idolmaster SideM: Growing Stars was released on October 6, 2021, for Android and iOS platforms.

=== Untitled console game ===
On September 13, 2026, D3 Publisher announced an untitled The Idolmaster SideM game set to release on Nintendo Switch and Nintendo Switch 2, the first game to be released on consoles.

== Media ==
=== Anime ===
An anime television series animated by A-1 Pictures aired in 2017 on Tokyo MX and BS11, and directed by Takahiro Harada and Miyuki Kuroki. The series was introduced with an extended length special Episode 0. The series focuses on some of the idol groups of SideM with their producer at 315 Pro and features animated performance sequences alongside the story.

A special unaired episode was included as part of the DVD and Blu-ray releases.

The Wake Atte Mini! anime series directed by Mankyū is based on the official chibi manga and is animated by Zero-G. The anime is a series of shorts featuring all SideM idols and aired in 2018.

=== Music ===
SideM has image songs published by Lantis (company) (later a label for Bandai Namco Arts.), released in several series. These songs are performed at SideM live concerts and similar live performance events.

The music was later used in the anime, with some songs being part of an animated performance. The anime also introduced original music of its own.

Some of music was integrated into the gameplay of LIVE ON ST@GE.

=== Manga ===
In addition to the comics available in-game, SideM has several published serialized manga.

Multiple manga have been serialized in Dengeki Maoh and later collected in volumes.

A series drawn by Michiru Satou called Idolmaster SideM Dramatic Stage ran from November 2015 to September 2017.
Another manga drawn by the same artist titled Idolmaster SideM Struggle Heart ran from December 2017 to April 2020.

The chibi manga Wake Atte Mini! drawn by Sumeragi was serialized in the magazine from June 2016 to March 2018. It received an anime adaptation in 2018, which in turn lead to a short second serialization from November 2018 to March 2019.
