= The Seven Deadly Sins season 1 =

2014 Japanese anime TV series

The Seven Deadly Sins
- Season 1
- Cover for the first home media volume of the season
- No. of episodes: 24

Release
- Original network: MBS, TBS
- Original release: October 5, 2014 – March 29, 2015

Season chronology
- Next → Signs of Holy War

The Seven Deadly Sins (Japanese: 七つの大罪, Hepburn: Nanatsu no Taizai) is an anime television series based on a Japanese fantasy manga series of the same name written and illustrated by Nakaba Suzuki. The series debuted on MBS, TBS and other JNN stations on October 5, 2014. The staff was revealed in the combined 36–37 issue of the year: animation production by A-1 Pictures, direction by Tensai Okamura, and written by Shōtarō Suga (Lagrange: The Flower of Rin-ne), with Keigo Sasaki (Blue Exorcist) providing character designs and Hiroyuki Sawano composing the music. The first opening theme song is "Netsujō no Spectrum" (熱情のスペクトラム, Netsujō no Supekutoramu; "Spectrum of Passion") performed by Ikimono-gakari for the first 12 episodes, and the second opening theme song is "Seven Deadly Sins" performed by Man with a Mission. While the first ending theme song, titled "7-Seven", is a collaboration between Flow and Granrodeo, the second ending theme from episode thirteen onwards is "Season" which is performed by Alisa Takigawa.

The first season of The Seven Deadly Sins was licensed for English release by Netflix as its second exclusive distribution for anime, following their acquisition of Knights of Sidonia. All 24 episodes were released on November 1, 2015, in both subtitled or English dub formats. On February 14, 2017, Funimation announced that it acquired the first anime for home video distribution for US and Canada and released the series on Blu-ray and DVD later in the year. Part One of the first season was released on Blu-ray on May 15, 2017, with Part Two being released June 20 the same year. The complete entirety of the first season was released on August 14, 2018. Madman Entertainment is importing Funimation's release into Australia and New Zealand, with a release scheduled for January 2019.

== Episodes ==
Story	Episode	Title (Note: English translated titles are taken from Netflix.)	Directed by	Written by	Storyboarded by	Original release date
1	1	"The Seven Deadly Sins"; Transliteration: "Nanatsu no Taizai" (Japanese: 七つの大罪)	Tomokazu Tokoro	Shōtarō Suga	Tensai Okamura	October 5, 2014
A seemingly young owner of the Boar Hat tavern and his talking pig Hawk encounter a rust-covered knight that drives away their customers, who assume the figure to be one of the Seven Deadly Sins. The knight then collapses, only revealed to be a young woman named Elizabeth, who is seeking the Seven Deadly Sins, the strongest of the Liones Kingdom's Holy Knight orders that have been branded as wanted criminals for supposedly betraying the kingdom ten years before. The tavern owner helps Elizabeth evade the Holy Knight unit known as the Beard of the Mountain Cat, learning that the Holy Knights staged a coup d'état and took control of Liones. The unit's leader Twigo confirms Elizabeth to be Liones' third princess, while the tavern owner introduces himself as Meliodas, the Deadly Sins' captain and bearer of the Sin of Wrath. Meliodas quickly defeats Twigo before he and Elizabeth escape on Hawk's Mom.
2	2	"The Sword of the Holy Knight"; Transliteration: "Seikishi no Ken" (Japanese: 聖騎士の剣)	Hideki Ito	Shōtarō Suga	Tensai Okamura, Rokurō Sakagami	October 12, 2014
Meliodas agrees to help Elizabeth since he is also looking for the other Deadly Sins for some unfinished business, giving her a new outfit to work as a waitress for their travels. The group soon set shop in Vanya Village, famous for its delicious ale, learning that a Holy Knight had planted his sword to magically cut off the water supply in response to a boy named Mead taking offense to the knight disrespecting the villagers' hard work. Despite the villagers' futile efforts, Meliodas easily removes the sword as only a Holy Knight can and is hailed a hero as the villagers celebrate in the Boar Hat. At Fort Solgales, Holy Knights inform their leader Gilthunder of his sword's removal. Gilthunder throws a spear imbued with his power to determine if it was Meliodas, receiving his confirmation when Meliodas senses the spear and redirects it at the fortress, nearly destroying it and just missing Gillthunder's head by mere inches. Meliodas decides to leave Vanya to protect the villagers from further damage and head towards the Forest of White Dreams, assuming one of his comrades is hiding there.
3	3	"The Sin in the Sleeping Forest"; Transliteration: "Nemureru Mori no Tsumi" (Japanese: 眠れる森の罪)	Tsuyoshi Tobita	Jukki Hanada	Futoshi Higashide	October 19, 2014
Meliodas's group arrive to the Forest of White Dreams, a foggy, dense forest where even the Holy Knights avoid. They encounter Prankster Imps that attempt to confuse the travellers by creating copies of their companions, forcing the imps to flee towards a sleeping giantess they wake up. Meliodas reveals the giant to be Diane, the Seven Deadly Sins member who possesses the Serpent's Sin of Envy, who briefly pummels her captain in a jealous rage upon seeing Elizabeth. The surprise reunion is cut short when Gilthunder arrives, Elizabeth recognizing him as her childhood friend before learning of his actions in Vanya. Gilthunder explains that he seeks to avenge his father, the Holy Knights' grand master Zaratras whom the Deadly Sins were said to have murdered, Meliodas, in spite of not remembering much of that fateful day, tries to explain, but Gilthunder refuses to listen as he and Meliodas engage in battle. After a heated battle, Glthunder outsmarts Meliodas and manages to inflict a mortal injury on him, only to be tricked into revealing the whereabouts of the Deadly Sin members bearing the sins of greed and sloth with the latter said to be dead.
4	4	"A Little Girl's Dream"; Transliteration: "Shōjo no Yume" (Japanese: 少女の夢)	Jin Iwatsuki	Yuniko Ayana	Tensai Okamura	October 26, 2014
Diane throws Gilthunder out of the forest and joins Meliodas to retrieve their comrade Ban, bearer of the Sin of Greed, from Baste Prison which is under the jurisdiction of the Holy Knights' Weird Fangs unit. However, Meliodas suddenly collapses from his injury, forcing the group to stop at the neighboring town Dalmally so he can be treated by the resident doctor Dana, both Diane and Elizabeth expressing their envy towards the other for how they can best help Meliodas as the former decides to head towards the prison. They soon find themselves attacked a swarm of poisonous insects led by the Weird Fangs' Friesia. Despite her irrational fear of bugs, Diane overcomes her fear to single-handedly dispatch the swarm and head out toward Baste Prison. Elizabeth goes to check on Meliodas and learns he has been poisoned by Dana under the forced command the Weird Fangs' Golgius, who has come to retrieve her and take Meliodas's sword. When he successfully acquires it, Meliodas suddenly wakes up. At Baste Prison, Ban breaks out of his cell when he hears mention of Meliodas.
5	5	"Even If You Should Die"; Transliteration: "Tatoe Anata ga Shindemo" (Japanese: たとえあなたが死んでも)	Yūsuke Onoda	Shōtarō Suga	Yoshihiro Sugai	November 2, 2014
Golgius flees after Meliodas throws a dark and ominous stare, proceeding to overwhelm Meliodas with his invisibility power while fatally wounding Dana to conceal his involvement in the Weird Fangs' abducting of his daughter Sennett to force him to aid them. Meliodas manages to outwit Golgius, who escapes on horseback before revealing why he attempted to steal Meliodas's sword. Elizabeth sheds tears over Dana, with Meliodas encouraging her not to falter, before she and the others run into Diane on their way to Baste Prison, learning she fell under the hypnosis of the Weird Fangs' Ruin. In the chaos, Meliodas is also subjected when he and Elizabeth run into two shepherds. Meanwhile, after attempting to try one the attire of apprentice Holy Knight Jericho, Ban gets stabbed in the chest by the Weird Fangs' Jude as he served his purpose as bait.
6	6	"The Poem of Beginnings"; Transliteration: "Hajimari no Uta" (Japanese: はじまりの詩)	Toshimasa Ishii	Jukki Hanada	Toshifumi Takizawa	November 9, 2014
As Meliodas and Diane still fight each other under Ruin's control, Friesia attacks the shepherd boy that Ruin disguised himself as to prompt Elizabeth to risk her life to protect him. However, as Ruin reveals his true identity and attacks Elizabeth, he realizes she took his bell and has broken his spell as he and Friesia are quickly defeated, while the other shepherd reveals where Sennett is being held. At the same time, Ban dispatches Jude before finding Meliodas as his group rescues Sennett. Outside the prison, Golgius erects a barrier to keep them inside, but the Holy Knights retreat when the prison gets destroyed by Meliodas and Ban's destructive reunion. The group returns to Dalmally, finding Dana having somehow survived as he treats the Sins to a meal. Meanwhile, Gillthunder visits King, bearer of the Grizzly's Sin of Sloth, and reminds him of their arrangement.
7	7	"A Touching Reunion"; Transliteration: "Kandō no Saikai" (Japanese: 感動の再会)	Yuuta Takamura	Yuniko Ayana	Kenji Seto	November 16, 2014
Years before joining the Seven Deadly Sins, Ban sought to become immortal by drinking the Fountain of Youth, a liquid sap produced by the Fairy King's Forest's Sacred Tree, so he can live long enough for something good to happen. He ceases his attempts after learning the Fountain of Youth sustains the Fairy King's Forest, the fountain's sworn protector Elaine realizing him not to be like the other humans. In the present, Meliodas and his group arrive to a rundown town near the Capital of the Dead where King is said to be buried. Ban takes a walk, meeting Ellen and Luigi, a pair of siblings. Ban is then attacked by a strange boy who he later learns to be King, who accuses him of destroying the Fairy King's Forest while seeking to enter the Capital of the Dead himself. The siblings reveal to Meliodas's group that the Capital is another world that can only be entered when one shares a priceless memory with the dead. Ban's memory of Elaine gives the group passage, with King following after them. Upon their departure, a female Holy Knight appears in the town soon after, violently interrogating Ellen and Luigi into entering the Capital of the Dead. She then acupunctures herself into a half-lifeless state.
8	8	"The Fearsome Pursuer"; Transliteration: "Osorubeki Tsuisekisha" (Japanese: 恐るべき追跡者)	Kenichi Imaizumi	Shōtarō Suga	Kenichi Imaizumi	November 23, 2014
Upon arriving in the Necropolis, a realm composed of green crystals, Ban follows Elaine's spirit with King in pursuit. King reveals himself as Elaine's older brother as he proceeds to petrify Ban for causing Elaine's death and the destruction of their home. This causes Ban to remember falling in love with Elaine before they were fatally wounded when the Fairy King's Forest is attacked by a demon, a monster whose race were sealed away ages ago. Elaine saves Ban by giving him the Fountain of Youth through a kiss, granting his immortality and allowing him to kill the demon. In the aftermath, the dying Elaine gives Ban a seed to grow a new Fairy King's Forest. As Meliodas and Diane battle the Holy Knight Guila after she projects her soul into the Capital, Elaine's spirit frees Ban so he can rejoin the others before eventually making herself visible to King. Elaine also convinces King to protect Ban after she reveals the truth to him, with King executing a surprise attack through Ban to strike Guila.
9	9	"Dark Pulse"; Transliteration: "Ankoku no Myakudō" (Japanese: 暗黒の脈動)	Hideki Ito	Jukki Hanada	Hideki Ito	November 30, 2014
King easily defeats Guila with his Sacred Treasure, the Spirit Spear Chastiefol, sending her soul back into her unconscious body which the group tie up upon their return to the living world. King explains to Elizabeth and Hawk that the Deadly Sins each use their full potential with a Sacred Treasure weapon, his comrades admitting having lost theirs through different circumstances, also revealing that Guila is a type of Holy Knight from a newly spawned Holy Knight order known as the New Generation. Meanwhile, Jericho and Twigo are summoned by Grandmaster Holy Knight Hendrickson to become part of the New Generation, which acquires them to drink the blood from the corpse of the demon that ravaged the Fairy King's Forest. Twigo explodes after drinking the blood while Jericho survives the excruciating experience. The following day, with Diane and Elizabeth staying behind, Meliodas brings Ban and King to the merchant town of Vaizel and sign up for its annual fighting festival, with the prize being Diane's Sacred Treasure, the War Hammer Gideon. Holy Knights Griamore, Princess Veronica Liones' bodyguard, and Howzer also sign up.
10	10	"The Vaizel Fighting Festival"; Transliteration: "Baizeru Kenka Matsuri" (Japanese: バイゼル喧嘩祭り)	Mitsutoshi Satō	Yuniko Ayana	Rokurō Sakagami	December 7, 2014
The fighting festival commences with Love Helm as the referee as eight contestants – Meliodas, Ban, King, three-time champ Taizoo, Griamore, Howzer, the town drunkard Cain Barzard, and mysterious fighter Matrona – are left standing after the elimination round. The first quarterfinal match has Matrona knocking Griamore out of the ring. Matrona is exposed as a human-sized Diane wearing Elizabeth's clothing, revealing that the two got themselves shrunk by a giant mushroom called a Chicken-Matango while foraging for food. After Howzer defeats Taizoo with one punch, King easily loses to Cain as he is nearly powerless unarmed. The fourth match is Meliodas versus Ban, with Griamore and Veronica revealing to Howzer the Seven Deadly Sins infiltrated the tournament as they search the village for Elizabeth, while Howzer rushes back to witness the fight.
11	11	"Pent-Up Feelings"; Transliteration: "Sekinen no Omoi" (Japanese: 積年の想い)	Tsuyoshi Tobita	Shōtarō Suga	Takeshi Furuta	December 14, 2014
Meliodas and Ban begin their match, proving to be equally skilled until Ban takes advantage of his Physical Hunt ability to steal Meliodas' strength and finish him off. However, the captain unleashes the mysterious power he exhibited in Dalmally to send Ban flying out of the ring, taking the win. The semifinals commence with Diane fighting Howzer, who initially holds back as a gentleman before going all out. Diane defeats the Holy Knight, who expresses enjoying his bout with a Deadly Sin member. Meliodas then faces Cain, who is revealed to be a former Holy Knight as he attacks Meliodas to see if he truly was responsible for the destruction of the Danafall kingdom as the rumors say. Cain makes peace with Meliodas after he confirms it to be a lie, forfeiting the match in response. The final match between Meliodas and Diane occurs soon after, with Ban making the fight more interesting by using Hawk's earnings to bribe women into provoking Diane to go all out in another jealous rage. Meanwhile, Guila and Jericho are approaching Vaizel, the latter intent on taking her revenge against Ban.
12	12	"Bloodcurdling Cannon"; Transliteration: "Senritsu no Kanon" (Japanese: 戦慄のカノン)	Jin Iwatsuki	Shōtarō Suga	Masatarō Shirogane	December 21, 2014
Meliodas and Diane stop fighting when they and the other Deadly Sins sense Guila and Jericho approaching, the four attempting to drive the townsfolk out by feigning a hostile takeover before the Holy Knights attack Vaizel. Jericho, who has embraced her womanhood following her defeat to Ban in Baste Prison, exacts her revenge on him before joining Guila in overpowering Meliodas before King intervenes. But Guila and Jericho are saved at the last second when Love Helm reveals himself as the former's commander Helbram, an old enemy of King's. Hawk and Elizabeth use the distraction to get Ban and Meliodas to safety, when Elizabeth returns to her original size just as Veronica and Griamore find her. Veronica scolds Elizabeth for getting herself involved with the Deadly Sins and believes Meliodas bewitched her as she traps him within a Goddess Amber, a stone specifically made to seal evil entities. Griamore is forced to trap Elizabeth when she attempts to flee with Meliodas's sword and the Goddess Amber, only to redirect the spell on Guila and Jericho when they attempt to take the girl against Veronica's wishes. Veronica chases after Elizabeth, only to take the full brunt of an explosive trap Guila littered around the village to save her younger sister. After Veronica seemingly dies from her wounds, Meliodas breaks out of the Goddess Amber in response to Elizabeth's anguished cries, but is enveloped by a dark, sinister aura.
13	13	"The Angel of Destruction"; Transliteration: "Hakai no Shito" (Japanese: 破壊の使徒)	Akinobu Kunimoto	Shōtarō Suga	Rokurō Sakagami	January 11, 2015
Meliodas has entered an outraged state after escaping the Goddess Amber, indiscriminately attacking his enemies and his own comrades, except Elizabeth. As Ban, Elizabeth and Hawk rush to safety, Helbram fights Meliodas, who concludes his power to exceed that of the New Generation before subduing him and taking his sword. Meanwhile, after being knocked into a ravine by Holy Knight Marmas while throwing an old man toward Howzer to protect, Diane emerges in her normal size after Hawk's Mom retrieves her clothes. Diane reclaims her Sacred Treasure and asks Howzer to flee with the old man and Marmas. Ban retrieves the others as Diane rescues Meliodas and covers the entire town with a massive boulder, destroying Vaizel while Helbram and his subordinates escape with Meliodias' sword hilt. After Griamore departs to give Veronica a burial, Diane comforts Elizabeth while Ban confides to King that he intends to use the Horn of Cernunnos kept in Liones to revive Elaine. With his sword now stolen and seeing how dangerous the Holy Knights are becoming; Meliodas decides to stop holding back and end the ongoing war for good.
14	14	"A Reader of Books"; Transliteration: "Hon wo Yomu Hito" (Japanese: 本を読むひと)	Toshimasa Ishii	Yuniko Ayana	Tensai Okamura	January 18, 2015
Helbram deploys the Holy Knights' elite Roars of Dawn unit to execute an Armor Giant roaming Ordan Forest. Despite Jericho's annoyance at not being chosen, Guila uses her leisure time to visit her younger brother Zeal, secretly killing three thugs who were bullying him because their father was said to be a deserter in the Holy Knight forces. Meliodas's group arrive to Ordan Village and split up. Elizabeth and Hawk, setting up advertisements, encounter a youth named Alan, who is looking for glue to repair the armor of his large traveling companion. While hunting to restock their supplies, Meliodas, Ban and King find the Armor Giant being attacked by the Roars of Dawn, recognizing the armor to be of their comrade Gowther. Just as it seems that the Armor Giant is about to be slain, Alan suddenly appears and reveals himself as the real Gowther, the Goat's Sin of Lust.
15	15	"Unholy Knight"; Transliteration: "Anhōryi Naito" (Japanese: アンホーリィ・ナイト)	Mitsutoshi Satō	Yuniko Ayana	Mitsutoshi Satō	January 25, 2015
After the Roars of Dawn realize they are face-to-face with four of the Deadly Sins, Gowther inexplicably decapitates the Armor Giant and gives its head to the knights. After the Roars of Dawn leave with their prize, Gowther reveals that his armor was sealing a power that was consuming what was once a Holy Knight as it mutates into a monster. Meliodas lowers his guard upon noticing the human within the monster still conscious as Gowther uses his Sacred Treasure, the Double Bow Harlit, to place the monster in a trance as Ban rips its heart out. However, it fails to work as the Holy Knight, whom the group recognized as Dale, Guila and Zeal's long-lost father, mutates further. Meanwhile, Cain visits Elizabeth in the Boar Hat and reveals her shared resemblance to a knight named Liz, who became Meliodas's girlfriend during his time in Danafall. When the demon makes its presence known, Elizabeth hurries to give Meliodas a sword that Liz initially offered years ago, allowing him to end the transformed demon's misery as he and the others realize it was created by someone within Liones' Holy Knights. At the same time, Helbram receives the Armor Giant's head and has Guila destroy the evidence of its existence.
16	16	"The Legends, Provoked"; Transliteration: "Karitaterareru Densetsu-tachi" (Japanese: 駆り立てられる伝説たち)	Hideki Ito	Jukki Hanada	Michio Fukuda	February 1, 2015
Gowther rejoins the Deadly Sins, though he causes trouble by using his power to deluge his teammates' darkest secrets (including Elizabeth's hidden crush on Meliodas) while revealing that Meliodas was knocked out by their comrade Merlin the day they were disbanded. At the capital, as Jericho reveals to Guila that she observed the Deadly Sins' battle with the mutated Dale and gives her senior her father's pendant, Helbram gives Meliodas' hilt to Hendrickson so he can complete the Coffin of Eternal Darkness relief, needing one more thing to release the demons and commence a new Holy War. At the Boar Hat, Meliodas explains more on the Coffin of Eternal Darkness before Elizabeth is abducted by the mage Vivian. Diane throws Meliodas, Ban and Gowther toward the Liones capital to initiate a frontal assault, while Hendrickson attempts to extort Grand Master Holy Knight Dreyfus's aid by reminding him that he got his position when they killed his brother Zaratras. The three Deadly Sins get bombarded by Dreyfus's Holy Knight army on the north side of the kingdom as Hendrickson deals with the king of Camelot, Arthur Pendragon, as his army approaches from the south side.
17	17	"The First Sacrifice"; Transliteration: "Saisho no Gisei" (Japanese: 最初の犠牲)	Yuuta Takamura	Shōtarō Suga	Yoshihiro Sugai	February 8, 2015
Hendrickson tries to convince Arthur to leave, only to engage him in battle as he realizes he might know his agenda. Meanwhile, with Hawk brought with her, Elizabeth escapes her cell and tries to find her father. Thanks to Gowther's mind-control magic, he, Ban and Meliodas manage to sneak into the castle town, while King summons his black hound Oslo to use its mouth to teleport him and Diane to the kingdom. But Diane, ending up stuck halfway, is attacked by Dreyfus and Helbram's groups, with Howzer reluctant to fight her. Knocked into the streets by Dreyfus, Helbram attacks the town, framing the damage on Diane. This causes a disillusioned Howzer and Guila to turn on their fellow Holy Knights when the wounded Diane injures herself further to save Zeal from a collapsing building.
18	18	"Even If It Costs Me My Life"; Transliteration: "Kono Inochi ni Kaete mo" (Japanese: この命にかえても)	Kenichi Imaizumi	Yuniko Ayana	Kenichi Imaizumi	February 15, 2015
Despite combining their attacks, Howzer and Guila are outmatched until Gowther arrives and traps Dreyfus in a chilling nightmare centered on his sins before something keeps the former metaphysically stuck in a trance. The effect of Gowther's Nightmare Teller spell takes its toll on Dreyfus as Gilthunder carries him to safety, while Helbram attempts to brutally finish off Diane and everyone near her when King intervenes, saddened that he couldn't save her in time. Helbram reveals himself as a fairy, and King's former best friend who became tortured and enraged, single-mindedly focusing his attacks on Diane to make King suffer. As King struggles against Helbram, he proclaims to fulfill a promise that he made seven centuries ago. Meanwhile, Elizabeth and Hawk find the former's eldest sister Margaret Liones and attempts to free her, but Vivian appears, teleporting Hawk elsewhere out her fear of pigs before she knocks Elizabeth out and unlocks Margaret's cell door, allowing her to escape under the condition that she gives up on Gilthunder.
19	19	"The Fairy King Waits in Vain"; Transliteration: "Machibōke no Yōseiō" (Japanese: まちぼうけの妖精王)	Mitsutaka Noshitani	Jukki Hanada	Rokurō Sakagami	February 22, 2015
700 years ago, after being wounded by a mysterious bearded man, King (who went by Harlequin at the time) suffered amnesia, being rescued from drowning by a young and lonely Diane. As time passes, the two spend decades together in what seemed to be days from their perspective. Harlequin eventually regains his memories of leaving the Fairy King's Forest to rescue Helbram and their friends from a one-eyed man named Aldrich who knocked him down a waterfall. When a nearby village is attacked, Harlequin goes to investigate, promising to Diane he will return to her, and encounters who he thought was Aldrich. But it turned out to be Helbram, who was driven madly obsessed to kill every human after seeing their true colors, with Harlequin forced to kill his friend to prevent further bloodshed. Harlequin turned himself in to the authorities, after erasing Diane's memories of him, to take responsibility for Helbram's actions. In the present, King manages to kill Helbram, who can finally atone for his grudge against humans. Meanwhile, Meliodas comes to Arthur's aid when he is overwhelmed by Hendrickson.
20	20	"The Courage Charm"; Transliteration: "Yūki no Majinai" (Japanese: 勇気のまじない)	Jin Iwatsuki	Shōtarō Suga	Atsushi Takahashi	March 1, 2015
After leaving Dreyfus, Gilthunder is sent by Vivian to aid Hendrickson against Meliodas and Arthur. Meanwhile, Elizabeth wakes up in the bedchambers of her father King Bartra Liones with Vivian mocking them before joining Gilthunder and Hendrickson to finish Meliodas off. When Meliodas sees Margaret jumping off a castle tower to free Gilthunder of his burden, Meliodas kills the monster that has been following her with Arthur saving her in time. This allows Gilthunder, having known the truth of Zaratras' death, to finally exact revenge on Hendrickson at full force. Vivian attempts to attack Meliodas, Gilthunder, Margaret and Arthur with illusions, but is stopped by Arthur's mage, who reveals herself as her mentor: The Seven Deadly Sins' Merlin, the Boar's Sin of Gluttony. Meanwhile, Ban enters the catacombs where Hawk was teleported to and finds the Horn of Cernunnos.
21	21	"The Looming Threat"; Transliteration: "Ima, Soko ni Semaru Kyōi" (Japanese: 今、そこにせまる脅威)	Tsuyoshi Tobita	Shōtarō Suga	Tomohisa Taguchi	March 8, 2015
After finding Hawk, Ban makes contact with a goddess through the Horn of Cernunnos, who agrees to resurrect Elaine on the condition that he kills Meliodas. Meanwhile, Meliodas and his group reach Elizabeth and Bartra before Dreyfus arrives. Margaret reveals that she witnessed him and Hendrickson murder Zaratras and that Vivian created familiars to keep her and Gilthunder silent. Dreyfus confesses to this while explaining that Hendrickson went insane in his effort trying to start a new Holy War. Bartra strips Dreyfus of his title and detains him to await sentencing. After Merlin takes Arthur and Bartra to Camelot for the latter to get medical help, an enhanced Hendrickson devastates the castle with a reanimated Helbram while awakening the demon blood in the New Generation Holy Knights, causing them to begin transforming into the same mutant states as Dale before them. After Hendrickson gravely injures Meliodas and Gilthunder, Elizabeth surrenders herself to save them. Meliodas attempts to pursue Hendrickson when he is attacked by Ban, who finally accepts that Meliodas is a demon. Elsewhere, Dreyfus confronts Hendrickson as Elizabeth threatens to kill herself to stop his plans.
22	22	"What I Can Do for You"; Transliteration: "Kimi no Tame ni Dekiru Koto" (Japanese: 君のためにできること)	Yasuto Nishikata	Yuniko Ayana	Tomokazu Tokoro	March 15, 2015
Despite Ban's fixation to resurrect Elaine at any cost, and Hawk's failed attempts of reasoning with him, Meliodas uses rank to convince Ban that they can settle matters later as he has Hawk take him to find Elizabeth. Ban joins the fray and manages to stop the mutated Jericho from killing her brother Gustaf and restores her to normal by extracting the organ causing her transformation, and as Gowther saves Guila from transforming, King musters the nerve to vaporize Helbram, who pleads with King to kill him. The Sins proceed to save the other New Generation members as a repentant Dreyfus battles Hendrickson one-on-one out of atonement with the fight ending with Dreyfus killed after his attack misses and wounds Elizabeth as Meliodas arrives, having Hawk carry Elizabeth to safety while he battles Hendrickson. He is joined by the other Sins and every able Holy Knight, Guila included, as they fight Hendrickson before Ban knocks him into a cave wall upon seeing the corpse of the demon that destroyed the Fairy King's Forest.
23	23	"Despair Descends"; Transliteration: "Zetsubō Kōrin" (Japanese: 絶望降臨)	Hideki Ito	Jukki Hanada	Shinji Ishihira	March 22, 2015
Hendrickson reveals that he developed the New Generation and his demonic powers from studying the corpse of the Red Demon that destroyed the Fairy King's Forest, with Ban pummeling Hendrickson through the ground before destroying the corpse. Meliodas, Ban, King and Gowther jump down after Hendrickson, finding him injecting himself with the blood from the corpse of a gray demon to evolve into a new form, easily overpowering the knights upon returning to the surface. Hendrickson reveals that he needs Elizabeth's blood to complete the ritual and release the demons back into the world, killing Hawk when he sacrifices himself to shield Meliodas while he protects Elizabeth. The shock of Hawk's death causes Elizabeth to reveal, what was initially unaware to her, her dormant powers as a goddess's apostle, healing everyone while slightly flinching Hendrickson. As this occurs, a recovered Veronica watches from afar.
24	24	"The Heroes"; Transliteration: "Eiyū-tachi" (Japanese: 英雄たち)	Toshimasa Ishii	Shōtarō Suga	Tensai Okamura	March 29, 2015
Having Gowther relay a combat strategy the other knights, Meliodas fights Hendrickson one-on-one while taking friendly fire to defeat him with his Revenge Counter. Griamore arrives at the last second to prevent Hendrickson's escape as the malicious Grand Master is defeated. A fully healed Bartra then returns with Merlin, commanding the Holy Knights to restore the kingdom and preserve its people as "punishment" for their actions. Bartra gives the Deadly Sins his gratitude for saving the kingdom and protecting Elizabeth, while Veronica returns and Hawk is revived, albeit in a small size. Merlin reveals to Meliodas that the Coffin of Eternal Darkness was taken south of Liones just before Hendrickson's defeat. The kingdom returns to some normalcy, holding a festival to celebrate. The following day, Elizabeth happily joins the Sins in their southward journey to find their last member while Ban and King leave the group for a while. Meanwhile, Gillthunder, Howzer, and Griamore uncover a revelation while studying Dreyfus's documents.

== Home media release ==
=== Japanese ===
Aniplex (Japan – Region 2/A)
Volume	Episodes	Release date	Ref.
1	1–3	January 28, 2015	
2	4–6	February 25, 2015	
3	7–9	March 25, 2015	
4	10–12	April 22, 2015	
5	13–15	May 27, 2015	
6	16–18	June 24, 2015	
7	19–20	July 22, 2015	
8	21–22	August 26, 2015	
9	23–24	September 23, 2015	

=== English ===
Netflix / Funimation (North America – Region 1/A)
Part		Episodes	Release date	Ref.
Season 1	1	1–12	May 16, 2017	
Season 1	2	13–24	June 20, 2017	
Season 1	Complete	1–24	August 14, 2018	
