= The Seven Deadly Sins: Revival of The Commandments =

2018 Japanese anime TV series

- Season 2
- Cover for the first home media DVD volume of Revival of The Commandments
- No. of episodes: 24

Release
- Original network: MBS, TBS
- Original release: January 13 – June 30, 2018

Season chronology
- ← Previous; Signs of Holy War Next → Imperial Wrath of The Gods

The Seven Deadly Sins: Revival of The Commandments (七つの大罪 戒めの復活, Nanatsu no Taizai: Imashime no Fukkatsu) is the second season of The Seven Deadly Sins anime television series, which is based on Nakaba Suzuki's manga series with the same name. It was announced at the "Nanatsu no Taizai FES" event in July 2017 and premiered on January 13, 2018. Takeshi Furuta and Takao Yoshioka replaced Tensai Okamura and Shōtarō Suga as the director and series composer, respectively, while the other main staff members returned from the first season to reprise their roles. The series was released on October 15, 2018, on Netflix. The first opening theme song of the series titled "Howling" is a collaboration between Flow and Granrodeo, and first ending theme song is "Beautiful" performed by Anly. The second opening theme titled "Ame ga Furu kara, Niji ga Deru"(雨が降るから虹が出る) by Sky Peace and second ending theme titled "Chikai"(誓い) by Sora Amamiya.

== Episodes ==
Story	Episode	Title (Note: English translated titles are taken from Netflix.)	Directed by	Written by	Storyboarded by	Original release date
29	1	"Revival of the Demon Clan"; Transliteration: "Majin-zoku Fukkatsu" (Japanese: 魔神族復活)	Tomoya Tanaka	Takao Yoshioka	Takeshi Furuta	January 13, 2018
King Bartra decides to hold a ceremony to reward the Seven Deadly Sins and Hawk for saving his kingdom, while Ban and King leave for the Fairy King's Forest. The ceremony is interrupted as a group of Holy Knights, the Pleiades of the Azure Sky, object to the Sins' reward and wants to test their capabilities, but back down after Meliodas easily defeats their strongest member Dogedo. After the ceremony completes without any more hitches, Bartra informs the Sins of a recent premonition: an omen of 10 shadows threatening Britannia, and a towering beast threatening Camelot. Meanwhile, Hendrickson has been returned to his human state while finding himself before what appears to be Dreyfus as the ritual of bringing the demons back to Britannia after three millennia has been fulfilled, with Meliodas ominously feeling their return.
30	2	"Existence and Proof"; Transliteration: "Sonzai to Shōmei" (Japanese: 存在と証明)	Chika Nagaoka	Yuichiro Kido	Chika Nagaoka	January 20, 2018
The Ten Commandments depart to Edinburgh Hill in the east to recover their magical powers. Meanwhile, with Jericho following them, Ban and King reach the new Fairy King's Forest. In the forest, the fairies welcome Ban with open arms as their king while denouncing King for failing them and the previous Fairy King's Forest. Back in Liones, as Meliodas reveals to Merlin that the Ten Commandments have returned, Diane encourages Elizabeth to confess her love for Meliodas while admitting her love for King since regaining her childhood memories of him. The two soon find Zeal with no memory of his sister Guila and learn that Gowther had altered Guila's and her brother's memories, as part of his twisted experiment to experience love, with an enraged Diane confronting him.
31	3	"Sacred Treasure Lostvayne"; Transliteration: "Jingi Rosutovein" (Japanese: 神器ロストヴェイン)	Nobuyoshi Nagayama	Chiaki Nagai	Susumu Nishizawa	January 27, 2018
The Ten Commandments reach the castle on Edinburgh Hill and find it destroyed by Meliodas. Meanwhile, a defeated Gowther restores Guila and Zeal's memories before asking Merlin to seal him before he loses control again. Merlin reverts Gowther to his original form, a 6-inch wooden doll, and gives him to Slader for safekeeping. Merlin then senses a magical disturbance in Camelot and teleports the Boar Hat there, finding it under attack by a demon-made Golem known as an Albion. After Meliodas breaks Liz's Sword in his effort to save Arthur, Merlin returns him his Sacred Treasure Lostvayne, which she had bought back from the pawn shop he sold it to, to destroy the Albion. Back at the Fairy King's Forest, the former learning that Helbram's spirit now resides in his helmet, King and Jericho discover that the new forest is maintained every few years by Ban's blood since it contains the Fountain of Youth. However, the forest is suddenly attacked by another Albion.
32	4	"The Ten Commandments on the Move"; Transliteration: "<Jikkai> Shidō" (Japanese: 〈十戒〉始動)	Yūsuke Maruyama	Masanao Akahoshi	Koichi Hatsumi	February 3, 2018
As King battles the Albion to protect the forest while Jericho runs off to warn him, Ban is impaled by the fairy king's aide Gerheade over her refusing to accept him as her people's king when she resorts to attacking Elaine to keep Ban in the forest as the new Fountain of Youth. King fails to stop the Albion from destroying the sacred tree, with Gerheade attempting to get King to safety as the other fairies rush to hold it off out of guilt for their scorn. However, King refuses to flee, spurred on with his desire to protect everyone, including Ban, allowing him to transform Chastiefol into its True Spirit Spear form to destroy the golem. Back in Camelot, the victory of Meliodas's group is short-lived when the Ten Commandments sense the Albions' destruction, and their member Galand of Truth appears in Camelot.
33	5	"Overwhelming Violence"; Transliteration: "Attōteki Bōryoku" (Japanese: 圧倒的暴力)	Seung Hui Son	Yutaka Yasunaga	Toshiyuki Fujisawa	February 10, 2018
At the Fairy King's Forest, Ban uses his blood to restore Sacred Tree and heal King before threatening Gerheade if she harms Elaine's body again as he leaves with Jericho, still showing no intention of rejoining the Sins. Back at Edinburgh Hill, Fraudrin, the demon possessing Dreyfus' body, informs his fellow Commandments that magic once abundant in the ground has transferred in humans, inspiring the demons to consume human souls to regain their full strength by summoning lesser demons to gather them. Back at Camelot, despite not being at full strength, with Merlin casting Perfect Cube on Arthur, Elizabeth, and Hawk, Galand easily overpowers Meliodas and Diane. Merlin attempts to deceive him into a false sense of security, only to fall victim to the petrification effects of Galand's Commandment of Truth for lying to him. Meliodas is forced to unleash his demonic power, only to be defeated. Galand proceeds to kill Meliodas, Slader, and Diane while smashing Merlin, taking his leave as a restored Gowther laughs while watching him depart, having fabricated the scene by altering Galand's short-term memory. Meanwhile, Gilthunder and his group, having left Liones on their own objective, come across a village attacked by a Red Demon harvesting souls. Though they destroy the demon, with the souls restored to their bodies, the Holy Knights find themselves facing a Grey Demon as Hendrickson arrives to their aid.
34	6	"The Great Holy Knight Atones For His Sins"; Transliteration: "Tsugunai no Seikishi-chō" (Japanese: 償いの聖騎士長)	Hye Jin Seo	Chiaki Nagai	Susumu Nishizawa	February 17, 2018
Revealing Dreyfus to be alive and himself to be a Druid as Gilthunder's group wound the Grey Demon enough for him to destroy its soul, Hendrickson reveals the events that led to Zaratras' death. A decade ago, Hendrickson and Dreyfus were sent to investigate the ruins of Danafall and learned it was caused by a demon named Fraudrin, who Meliodas greatly weakened after the demon killed Liz. Fraudrin forces Dreyfus into serving as his host after briefly possessing Hendrickson, whose mind was poisoned from the ordeal. Back in Camelot, everyone but Merlin has been healed as Gowther revealed that he tampered with Galand's memory and was about to run off when a magic restraint bracelet is placed on him by Merlin, who transferred her soul into her Sacred Treasure, the crystal ball "Morning Star Aldan", at the last second. After Merlin explains how one Ten Commandant member is stronger than the current number of Sins combined, Meliodas decides to get their group into shape while they locate their last member Escanor, the Deadly Sins' Sin of Pride. King soon arrives, wanting to see Diane, who is unable to remember anyone.
35	7	"Where Memories Lead"; Transliteration: "Kioku ga Mezasu Basho" (Japanese: 記憶が目指す場所)	Shunsuke Ishikawa	Takao Yoshioka	Shunsuke Ishikawa	February 24, 2018
Diane's memory continues regressing before she runs off. King attacks Gowther after he reveals himself to be responsible for Diane's memory loss, inspired by her comment over him manipulating Guila's memories, to experiment on her. The group assumes Diane would most likely return to her homeland of Megadoza. Sixteen years prior, Diane was mentored by her tribe's chieftain Matrona alongside Dolores, who wanted to leave but was afraid of humans. When Diane attempted to tell Dolores of Liones after first meeting Meliodas, she learns her friend died on a mission Matrona sent her on. Diane realizes she wanted more from life than fighting, despite Matrona seeing her potential to become their tribe's greatest warrior. Matrona and Diane are hired by a Liones Holy Knight named Gyannon to drive off some barbarians. The following day, Gyannon wounds Matrona with a poisoned spear in an attempt of infamy. Matrona kills him and most of his men before she succumbs to the poison. The surviving knights frame Diane for their unit's slaughter and Matrona's demise, with Diane ending up in Meliodas's custody when he pardons her sentence to execution.
36	8	"The Druids' Holy Land"; Transliteration: "Doruido no Seichi" (Japanese: ドルイドの聖地)	Tomoya Tanaka	Yuichiro Kido	Tomoya Tanaka	March 3, 2018
Having lost sixteen years of her memories, Diane reaches Edinburgh on her way to Megadoza to inform her tribe of Matrona's death. But she is sensed by the Commandments as Galand and Monspeet of Reticence attempt to take her soul. Matrona, alive and well, appears, knocking Diane out before hiding from Galand while Monspeet senses Meliodas's group from hundreds of miles away and shoots a spell at them to confirm Meliodas's presence. Luckily, Hawk's Mom eats the spell while an injured Matrona carries Diane away. Merlin advises changing course for Diane's safety, taking them to the Druids' Holy Land of Istar, whom she entrusted its protectors the bulk of Meliodas' power she took from him as a precautionary measure. The group meet the twin apostles Jenna and Zaneri, the latter taking Meliodas and Elizabeth to the Tower of Trials where the former is put under a trial, reliving his days in Danafall with Liz.
37	9	"A Promise to A Loved One"; Transliteration: "Ai suru Mono to no Yakusoku" (Japanese: 愛する者との約束)	Kenji Takahashi	Masanao Akahoshi	Takeshi Furuta	March 10, 2018
As Elizabeth receives a trial to make a diseased seed bloom into a flower, Meliodas is forced to relive his time with Liz leading to her death in order to eradicate his emotions so his power would not destroy indiscriminately. Zaneri considers ending the test as the emotional strain will kill him if he can't control it, but Elizabeth stops her as Meliodas passes the trial through his resolve of never letting anyone he cares for like Liz to die. The rest of the group are taken to the Tower of Training by Jenna where they encounter Hendrickson and Gilthunder's group. Meanwhile, Ban's search for a means of reviving the dead brings him and Jericho to Ravens, the city of thieves, where they find an old were-fox that Ban brings to their room. Ban recalls his childhood when he met a man named Zhivago while imprisoned, who offered to help him escape.
38	10	"What We Lacked"; Transliteration: "Bokutachi ni Kaketa Mono" (Japanese: 僕たちに欠けたもの)	Minami Yoshida	Yutaka Yasunaga	Shinobu Yoshioka	March 17, 2018
Recognizing the old werefox as Zhivago, Ban remembers the thief having taken him under his wing until the day he got caught attempting a burglary by himself. Zhivago was forced to abandon Ban in order to save his son Selion from hunters, arriving too late while believing Ban was killed. But Ban reveals his identity while bearing no ill will towards Zhivago's decision. Back at Istar, Hendrickson, with Gilthunder, Howzer and Griamore with him, tells King he is ready to accept the consequences of his actions once they have defeated the Commandments before the Holy Knights, Arthur, and Gowther enter the Tower of Training. Gilthunder and Howzer nearly defeat a Clay Dragon by using new techniques inspired by advice from Meliodas and Dreyfus, while Gowther and Arthur battle an animated suit of armor. King later enters the cave with Meliodas, who intends to train his body before taking back his power. As Meliodas asks King to understand that Hendrickson was manipulated by Fraudrin, whom he reveals as one of the Ten Commandments, King confronts Meliodas about being a Demon and questions where his loyalty lies while attacking him.
39	11	"Father and Son"; Transliteration: "Chichioya to Musuko" (Japanese: 父親と息子)	Kazuya Monma	Yuichiro Kido	Susumu Nishizawa	March 24, 2018
In Ravens, as a corpse rises from his grave, Ban tells Zhivago about the Fountain of Youth and his goal of reviving Elaine. Ban also admits his regret over his attempt to kill Meliodas in exchange for Elaine's resurrection, his self-hatred worsened by Meliodas forgiving and sympathizing with him. Zhivago urges Ban to reconcile with Meliodas and tell him his real feelings before he dies peacefully. Back in Istar, the former being accused of being in league with the Commandments while belittling his opponent over his lack of wings, Meliodas and King end their fight when Jenna orders them out. Meliodas promises to eventually explain everything to King as he decides to observe him for the time being, sensing a sudden feeling on his back. After Jenna restores Meliodas's full power, he has Merlin momentarily teleport him to Edinburgh so he can "talk" to the Commandments. Zaneri reveals to Jenna that Meliodas learned to channel his rage rather than eradicate it as he easily defeats Galand, returning to Istar after warning the other Commandments that the Seven Deadly Sins will destroy them if they intend to continue what they started 3,000 years ago.
40	12	"Where Love is Found"; Transliteration: "Ai no Arika" (Japanese: 愛の在り処)	Yūsuke Maruyama	Takao Yoshioka	Mamoru Sasaki	March 31, 2018
Provoked by Meliodas, unaware he formulated a divide-and-conquer strategy against them, the Commandments scatter across Britannia to recover their magic by any means. The rest of the group, including a dragon-ized Hawk and a de-aged Griamore, complete their training, save for Elizabeth, who gains new attire albeit failing her trial. After Meliodas's group leaves to begin their search for Escanor, Jenna has Zaneri confess to sabotaging Elizabeth's training, possibly due to her unrequited feelings for Meliodas, but Zaneri explains her reasons were actually to protect Meliodas from the pain of losing Elizabeth as she figured out the girl to be a reincarnation of Liz. As the other Commandants spread across Britannia, Galand is paired with Commandment Melascula of Faith and learns she has been resurrecting the dead to act on their regret and resentment. After Ban easily dispatches a corpse after he and Jericho bury Zhivago, he is suddenly reunited with Elaine, with King leaving Meliodas's group after Helbram informs him of his sister's return.
41	13	"Farewell, Beloved Thief"; Transliteration: "Saraba Itoshiki Tōzoku" (Japanese: さらば愛しき盗賊)	Hiroki Hirano	Masanao Akahoshi	Susumu Nishizawa	April 14, 2018
After reuniting with Ban, a jealous Elaine attempts to kill Jericho, with Ban getting severely injured in his attempt to stop her, as he knows she's being manipulated. Jericho manages to pin Elaine to the ground, admitting her unrequited feelings for Ban while forcing Elaine to realize she is being exploited through her selfishness as she attempts to regain control of herself. Ban manages to calm Elaine down by repeating his promise to steal her away before she suddenly collapses. Galand and Melascula appear, and the latter explains that her spell over Elaine is failing as her jealousy has faded. Galand takes an interest in Ban's immortality and offers him a free blow. Ban accepts, using Hunter Fest to take half of Galand's strength and land a severe blow. Melascula then extracts Ban's soul after deeming it pure by him maintaining his faith in Elaine, with Galand snatching the soul from his fellow Commandant to eat. Luckily, the soul Galand ate is revealed to be Zhivago, allowing Ban to return to his body and flee with Jericho and Elaine, after destroying one of each Commandment's seven hearts. Meanwhile, with Dreyfus keeping him from eating souls, Fraudrin suffers a humiliating defeat by members of the Pleiades of the Azure Sky, observed by fellow Commandment Grayroad of Pacifism.
42	14	"Master of the Sun"; Transliteration: "Taiyō no Aruji" (Japanese: 太陽の主)	Jin Iwatsuki	Yutaka Yasunaga	Tensai Okamura	April 21, 2018
After refusing to leave Ban and Elaine behind, with the Commandments after them, Jericho carries them into a cave where they find a tavern owned by a timid barkeep who recognizes Ban, overjoyed to learn the Sins have been pardoned. The barkeep gets the group into his pantry before Galand and Melascula arrive, the demons partaking in alcohol before revealing they know he is hiding their quarry. But as Galand senses them near death, he offers the barman the chance to for him and the others to live if he can kill him in a game where they fight to the death, with both subjected to the demon's Commandment of Truth should they flee. Galand accidentally knocks the barkeep out for the remainder of the night before they could begin. As dawn breaks, Galand attempts to pick up a heavy gold battle axe on the bar's mantle before it is grabbed by a muscular and confident version of the barkeep as he introduces himself as the Deadly Sins' Escanor, the Lion's Sin of Pride. Healing from being cut in half, Galand finds his strongest ability only left Escanor with a tiny scratch and ends up turning to stone when the fear of death overrides his pride. Melascula attempts to eats Escanor's soul, only to be burned alive by his Sunshine ability before disappearing down a ravine. As the sun sets, Jericho and Elaine are formally introduced to Escanor, learning his power varies on the time of day, leaving him being a weakling during nighttime. King arrives and is shocked to see that Elaine is alive.
43	15	"A Bloodcurdling Confession"; Transliteration: "Senritsu no Kokuhaku" (Japanese: 戦慄の告白)	Takuya Asaoka	Yuichiro Kido	Koichi Hatsumi	April 28, 2018
After being saved by Matrona, Diane learns her mentor survived Gyannon's attempt on her life when her poison leg was amputated by a barbarian named Zalpa whom Diane spared days prior to the incident and since became a part of his family. Matrona proceeds to teach Diane a sacred dance created by the founder of their race, Drole, before pamphlets for an upcoming fighting festival in Vaizel rain down prior to Zalpa's children Sol and Della being injured by the Blue Demon responsible. As Matrona decides to enter the festival, as the prize is any wish the victor desires, Meliodas also attends, despite knowing it to be a trap by the Commandments. At Vaizel, the Commandant Gloxinia of Repose intends to use the fight to gather a large number of souls for himself and his partner Drole of Patience. Meanwhile, following his capture, Fraudrin ends up fighting Pleiades Captain Denzel Liones and is inflicted with a curse to be attacked by the ghosts of his victims. But Fraudrin is rescued by Grayroad, who assumed the guise of Dogedo to break the encasement seal, with Fraudrin exacting revenge on Deldrey for casting her Love Drive on him during his capture. Fraudrin then reveals himself to be a substitute for the Commandment member who mysteriously disappeared and supposedly joined the Deadly Sins following his commandment-induced amnesia: Gowther of Selflessness, who intends to win a heart at the festival.
44	16	"Death-Trap Maze"; Transliteration: "Shi no Wana no Meikyū" (Japanese: 死の罠の迷宮)	Hiroshi Kimura	Takao Yoshioka	Shunsuke Ishikawa	May 5, 2018
Matrona and Diane reach a massive maze, the first trial of Gloxinia's Vaizel festival, and eventually get separated. Diane ends up encountering Hawk and Elizabeth and initially distrusts them due to her amnesia and their affiliation with Liones, only to warm up to Elizabeth's kindness as they meet up with Gilthunder and Howzer, encountering Land and Earth Crawlers dispatched to devour the stragglers. The survivors manage to kill the monsters off, with Meliodas and Elizabeth sensing each other's presence through a wall. Ban reunites with Meliodas, informing him that he found Escanor and that Elaine is alive. He also sincerely apologizes to him for attempting to kill him. Meliodas forgives him as they smash through the wall to reach Elizabeth and the others. They reach the center of the maze where Gloxinia and Drole are waiting with Matrona and several other competitors who beat the maze.
45	17	"Legendary Figures"; Transliteration: "Denshō no Monodomo" (Japanese: 伝承の者共)	Tomoya Tanaka	Masanao Akahoshi	Tomoya Tanaka	May 12, 2018
Diane and Matrona are shocked to learn Drole is with the demons while King recognizes Gloxinia as the first fairy king who was said to have died during the Ancient Holy War, Gloxinia kills off the remaining stragglers once Gowther arrives, displaying his power by healing Escanor after impaling him for panicking over his broken glasses. Drole proceeds to place everyone in random pairs for a series of tag-team battles. Elizabeth and Elaine manage to defeat two assassin brothers who were killed off despite Elizabeth healing them out of kindness. Meliodas and Ban kill two of Gloxinia's Blue Demons as an afterthought while arguing over whether Elizabeth or Elaine is the ideal woman. King and Diane face Gloxinia and Drole's golem representatives, with King managing to convince Diane to let him help despite her not recognizing him. However, Gloxinia and Drole increase their constructs' fighting strength once the former realizes King is the current fairy king, with King unleashing his Sacred Treasure's power to protect Diane.
46	18	"For Whom Does That Light Shine?"; Transliteration: "Sono Hikari wa Ta ga tame ni" (Japanese: その光は誰が為に)	Seung Hui Son	Yutaka Yasunaga	Mamoru Sasaki	May 19, 2018
Following their encounter with Fraudrin and Greyroad, Denzel and his team discuss with Guila and Gustaf on the Commandments' attack on Brittania, with them conquering Camelot, and the potential threat Gowther poses. Back at Vaizel, King exerts all his power to defeat Gloxinia's golem and then encourages Diane to use her feelings toward those she cares for to create golems after him, Meliodas, Elizabeth, Hawk, and Matrona to obliterate Drole's golem. During the match between Gowther and Jericho against Hawk and Escanor, expressing his intent to get a heart so he can feel emotion at any cost, Gowther takes out Jericho and Hawk before using Nightmare Teller to subject Escanor to his tragic past and his worst nightmare of being rejected by Merlin because his power would eventually destroy him. This has an opposite effect, empowering Escanor as he calls upon his Sacred Treasure, Divine Axe Rhitta, to enter his Sunshine state with the intent of using the stored energy to obliterate those who play with others' hearts. After subduing Gowther, Escanor prepares a finishing strike, instead redirecting it at Gloxinia and Drole.
47	19	"Meliodas vs. The Ten Commandments"; Transliteration: "Meriodasu vs <Jikkai>" (Japanese: メリオダスvs<十戒>)	Yūsuke Maruyama, Tomoya Tanaka	Yuichiro Kido	Ryuuta Yanagi	May 26, 2018
Following Gloxinia and Drole being injured by Escanor's attack, revealing his participation as a ruse, Meliodas seizes his chance to attack them, with the mage Gilfrost teleporting the group to Liones castle after Drole sent them underground as his hostages. After healing himself and restoring Drole's arms, Gloxinia reminds Meliodas that they were once allies in fighting the demons together. Though reluctant to fight his former allies, Meliodas expresses that he must because they decided to switch sides. The others watch the fight on Gilfrost's crystal ball, Meliodas having the upper hand by quickly crippling one Commandant to fight the other. The battle soon attracts the other surviving Commandments, including a still-burnt Melascula and Meliodas's brothers - Estarossa of Benevolence and Zeldris of Piety. As Ban explains to the group that Meliodas is seen by the Commandants as a traitor to the Demon race, Meliodas fights the Commandments, despite being outnumbered, purposely allowing himself to be severely beaten to unleash a Revenge Counter powerful enough to strike them all down. However, Estarossa effortlessly stops the attack, letting Meliodas finally collapse from exhaustion before brutally crushing him under his foot to give his older brother a quick death.
48	20	"Have hope" Transliteration: "Kibō wo Motomete" (Japanese: 希望を求めて)	Minami Yoshida	Takao Yoshioka	Susumu Nishizawa	June 2, 2018
Estarossa proceeds to torture Meliodas while revealing him as the Commandments's original leader and the Demon King's heir before he caused the Holy War between the demons and goddesses while killing Drole and Gloxinia's predecessors. Melascula, after having Gloxinia heal her body while the Commandments learn their hostages escaped, attempts to take Meliodas's soul. Ban, after saying goodbye to Elaine, has Gilfrost teleport him to the battlefield as he destroys five of Melascula's hearts, only to fail in preventing Estarossa from stabbing all seven of Meliodas's hearts, killing him. After the Commandments leave to conquer Brittania, Elizabeth somberly returns to the battlefield and cries over Meliodas' lifeless body. Sometime after Elizabeth heals Zalpa's children, with King offering Matrona and her family sanctuary in the Fairy King's Forest, Ban comes to terms over possibly losing Elaine as he helps defend Liones while Merlin secludes herself in her laboratory, while Gowther is imprisoned due to his past as a former Commandment. Having returned to Liones, the Weird Fangs became sacrificial offerings by the villagers, betraying the Holy Knights to the Commandments for their safety. Only Golgius manages to escape into the Forest of White Dreams before losing consciousness, later waking up in the Boar Hat with Elizabeth serving customers.
49	21	"Certain Warmth"; Transliteration: "Tashika na Nukumori" (Japanese: たしかな ぬくもり)	Hiroshi Kimura	Masanao Akahoshi	Hiroshi Kimura	June 9, 2018
Conflicted over being saved by his former enemies, Golgius takes his leave as Elizabeth runs the Boar Hat while tending to Meliodas' body, having healed him following his defeat to the Commandments, but now remains unresponsive. She and Hawk receive a visit from the knight they met at Gloxinia's Vaizel festival. The knight reveals himself as the former Grand Master Holy Knight Zaratras, having been resurrected by Melascula and fueled by his regret of failing to see Dreyfus and Hendrickson being manipulated. Zaratras proceeds with a druid spell to enable him, Elizabeth, and Hawk to see Meliodas' memories. It is revealed that Meliodas saved a baby Elizabeth after Danafall's destruction, resulting in him becoming a Holy Knight of Liones after King Bartra adopted her. Meliodas and Merlin, through Bartra's omens, then assembled the Seven Deadly Sins for the purpose of destroying the Commandments. Meliodas is then revealed to have been cursed with immortality for causing the Ancient War, with Elizabeth confident that he would honor his promise of returning to her. Meanwhile, Meliodas' soul awakens in Purgatory as he confronts his father, the Demon King, who intends to consume his son's emotions to restore his strength while making Meliodas forget Elizabeth and return to his former self. In Liones, the Commandments commence their invasion, with Estarossa using his Commandment of Benevolence to prevent Ban's group from attacking due to the hatred in their hearts. Only Escanor is unaffected since he feels only pity rather than hatred as he faces Estarossa alone.
50	22	"Return of the Sins"; Transliteration: "<Tsumi> no Kikan" (Japanese: 〈罪〉の帰還)	Yūsuke Shibata	Yutaka Yasunaga	Atsushi Takahashi	June 16, 2018
Escanor strikes Estarossa with Rhitta, with Estarossa revealing his Full Counter can redirect physical attacks. Escanor prevents casualties by blasting Estarossa with his Cruel Sun magic to a lake that quickly evaporates from the attack's intense heat, the Commandment using his Black Out to seal Escanor's second Cruel Sun. However, the sun reaches its highest point, and Escanor's heightened strength overpowers Estarossa by him swinging his axe too fast for Estarossa to counter as he is knocked off into the distance with Zeldris despite the latter's attempt to save him. As Escanor decides to return to Liones later in the day, Ban's group gets attacked by the Holy Knights who fell under the control of Zeldris's Commandment of Piety, who wound Gustaf as Derieri and Monspeet arrive. Captain Denzel sacrifices his life so his body can be used by the summoned Holy Soldier-level Goddess, Nerobasta. But Nerobasta berates her resurrection and attempts to flee after refusing to fight the humans' battles, provoking Derieri into destroying her vessel out of hatred for the Goddesses. Derieri and Monspeet then sense Elizabeth and Zaratras rushing towards Liones as Hawk accidentally swallows a piece of a Red demon while his mother fends off the demons blocking their way. Derieri recognizes Elizabeth when she accidentally used a power exclusive to the Goddesses, with her attempt of killing her stopped by a revived Meliodas.
51	23	"The Hero Rises!"; Transliteration: "Eiyū, Tatsu!" (Japanese: 英雄、立つ！)	Masahiro Shinohara	Yuichiro Kido	Koichi Hatsumi	June 23, 2018
Hawk returns Lostvayne to Meliodas just as Derieri destroys the Boar Hat and grabs her opponent for Monspeet to attack, only for Meliodas, acting uncharacteristically ruthless, to throw Derieri at Monspeet and take them both out with Full Counter. In Liones, Ban's group inform Bartra of his brother's death before Fraudrin and Grayroad reveal themselves, with the latter taking Jericho and Guila's brother Zeal among other hostages. Fraudrin reveals Grayroad is a queen-caste demon who turns her human hostages into lesser demons, using Dogedo as an example of Greyroad's Commandment of Pacifism, which takes the remaining time of whoever kills in her presence. This causes Gilthunder to be spirited away by Gilfrost, who is actually Vivian in disguise, while Gustaf attempts to save his sister and Zeal before dying from his wounds. A restored Merlin suddenly appears and freezes the eggs, revealing herself immune to Greyroad's commandment due to her Infinity power and her true identity as the daughter of Belialuin before sealing Grayroad away in a test tube. Fraudrin attempts to escape before being stopped by Hendrickson, with Zaratras joining the latter. Fraudrin is distracted by Hawk long enough for Zaratras to purge the demon from Dreyfus, who seemingly destroys him as Griamore arrives. Zaratras returns to the afterlife while telling Hendrickson and Dreyfus to let go of their guilt. Fraudrin is revealed to have survived Dreyfus's attack and is stopped by Meliodas, both demons eager to finish their fight from 16 years ago.
52	24	"As Long As You Are Here"; Transliteration: "Kimi ga Iru Dake de" (Japanese: 君がいるだけで)	Tomoya Tanaka, Aika Ikeda	Takao Yoshioka	Takeshi Furuta	June 30, 2018
Ban and Merlin sense something different about Meliodas as he overpowers Fraudrin and belittles him as a substitute Commandant. This forces Fraudrin to attempt a suicide attack that would destroy all of Liones, but seeing Griamore causes Fraudrin to realize he has grown to care for him, despite pretending to be Dreyfus to conceal his presence. When Griamore grabs Fraudrin and erects a seal so only they die, the demon realizes what motivated Meliodas's betrayal in the past and ceases his attack while allowing Meliodas to kill him, which he heartlessly does. Merlin explains the nature of Meliodas's curse to Escanor, that Meliodas loses some of his emotions each time he dies and revives being gradually regressed to his original self as a demon. Funerals are later held for the dead, with Bartra insisting that all past grudges must be cast aside for their survival. A despondent Meliodas is later found at the ruins of the Boar Hat by Elizabeth, who comforts him over how horrified he is from enjoying murdering Fraudrin. He also tearfully admits he is afraid of becoming his old self even if it means keeping Elizabeth safe from the Commandments. Merlin restores the destroyed city and also reveals that all the humans enslaved by Zeldris' commandment have departed for Camelot. Ban reveals that Elaine is still alive, Merlin reasoning that Melascula must still be alive along with Drole, Gloxinia and Estarossa. As Jericho mourns her brother Gustaf, she inherits his ice magic, while Gowther, at Merlin and Bartra's request, is released on probation. Meliodas decides all of the Seven Deadly Sins must go to war together, while Elizabeth promises to always stay by his side.

== Recap special ==
Story	Episode	Title	Original release date
28.5	0	"The Seven Deadly Sins: Revival of The Commandments -Prologue-"; Transliteration: "Nanatsu no Taizai: Imashime no Fukkatsu -Joshō-" (Japanese: 七つの大罪 戒めの復活 -序章-)	January 6, 2018
A recap special of the first season with additional scenes.

== Home media release ==
=== Japanese ===
Aniplex (Japan – Region 2/A)
Volume	Episodes	Release date	Ref.
1	1–3	April 25, 2018	
2	4–6	May 30, 2018	
3	7–9	June 27, 2018	
4	10–12	July 25, 2018	
5	13–15	August 29, 2018	
6	16–18	September 26, 2018	
7	19–20	October 24, 2018	
8	21–22	November 28, 2018	
9	23–24	December 26, 2018	
