= Yuniko Ayana =

Japanese screenwriter

- 綾奈 ゆにこ
- Occupation: Screenwriter
- Notable work: Kin-iro Mosaic; Girls Beyond the Wasteland; The Seven Deadly Sins: Signs of Holy War; BanG Dream!; The Idolmaster SideM; Given; The Magical Girl and the Evil Lieutenant Used to Be Archenemies
- Awards: Newtype Anime Awards Screenplay Award (2018)

Yuniko Ayana (Japanese: 綾奈 ゆにこ, Hepburn: Ayana Yuniko) is a Japanese anime screenwriter and manga author. After making her debut in The Tower of Druaga, she began serving as a script supervisor for several anime series and franchises, including Kin-iro Mosaic, Girls Beyond the Wasteland, The Seven Deadly Sins: Signs of Holy War, BanG Dream!, The Idolmaster SideM, Given, D4DJ, and The Magical Girl and the Evil Lieutenant Used to Be Archenemies. She also works in the yuri genre, including a 2014 essay collection Chīsai Yuri Mītsuketa and preface for the entrance at the Yuriten 2017 convention.

== Biography ==
In 2008, while still a university student, Yuniko Ayana made her first screenwriting credit for the 2008 series The Tower of Druaga. She subsequently served as script supervisor for Kin-iro Mosaic, Locodol, and Merman in My Tub. She was hired to be the series composition writer for Ground Control to Psychoelectric Girl by request of director Akiyuki Shinbo, who felt that the series would've been more interesting if the series composition was instead written from the perspective of a woman.

Ayana was script supervisor and, alongside Ayumi Sekine, co-scenario writer for Makura no Danshi, as well as story concept creator for Flip Flappers. In 2016, she was script supervisor for Girls Beyond the Wasteland and The Seven Deadly Sins: Signs of Holy War. She was later script supervisor for The Idolmaster SideM, for which she and Yukie Sugawara won the 2018 Newtype Anime Awards Screenplay Award.

Ayana was the script supervisor for all three seasons of the BanG Dream! anime (2017-2020) and the 2021 sequel movie BanG Dream! Episode of Roselia, as well as the screenwriter for the 2022 sequel movie BanG Dream! Poppin'Dream!. In 2023, she was the screenwriter and script supervisor for the spinoff BanG Dream! It's MyGO!!!!!; she recalled in an interview with Comic Natalie that this job was challenging because she "had never written a script so realistically before". She also served as script supervisor for D4DJ First Mix, another Bushiroad anime. In February 2025, Ayana stated on Twitter that she had not been involved with the BanG Dream! franchise since late 2023, with her work on the series composition of BanG Dream! Ave Mujica and the scriptwriting of its first episode being her last contribution to the series. However, she also served as the screenwriter for the twelfth episode of the series. After the episode aired, she tweeted that due to frequently receiving "rude replies from netizens," she wanted to clarify that the "creepy and convoluted" settings in Ave Mujica had nothing to do with her, yet she later clarified that she "had no intention of disparaging the work at all".

Ayana later served as script supervisor for Given and Bikkurimen, as well as the screenwriter for the former's 2020 film sequel Given. She is serving as co-script supervisor (alongside Midori Gotō) for Narenare: Cheer for You! as well as script supervisor and screenwriter for The Magical Girl and the Evil Lieutenant Used to Be Archenemies.

In 2014, Kadokawa published Chīsai Yuri Mītsuketa (ちいさい百合みぃつけた), an essay collection of Ayana's Newtype column of the same name, also including yuri manga she worked on. She was the writer of Shigeyoshi Takagi's manga Sore ga Sekai no Futsū ni Naru, and the two held an autograph session at the Animega store in Shinjuku Marui Annex on 28 February 2015. She wrote the preface for the entrance at the Yuriten 2017 convention. She also works in theatre, being the screenwriter for Butai: Sasayaku yō ni Koi wo Utau.

Ayana is a member of the Writers Guild of Japan.

== Filmography ==
=== Animated television ===
Year	Title	Notes	Ref.
2011	Ground Control to Psychoelectric Girl	Series composition	
2013–2015	Kin-iro Mosaic	Series composition	
2014	Locodol	Series composition	
2014	Merman in My Tub	Series composition	
2015	Makura no Danshi	Series composition; co-scenario writer (with Ayumi Sekine)	
2016	Flip Flappers	Story concept	
2016	Girls Beyond the Wasteland	Series composition	
2016	The Seven Deadly Sins: Signs of Holy War	Series composition	
2017–2020	BanG Dream!	Series composition	
2017	The Idolmaster SideM	Series composition	
2018	Lupin the 3rd Part V: Misadventures in France	Screenwriter	
2019	Given	Series composition	
2020	D4DJ First Mix	Series composition	
2023	Bikkurimen	Series composition	
2023	BanG Dream! It's MyGO!!!!!	Series composition and screenwriter	
2023–2024	The Apothecary Diaries	Screenwriter (Eps 8, 13, 17, 21)	
2024	Narenare: Cheer for You!	Series composition (with Midori Gotō)	
2024	The Magical Girl and the Evil Lieutenant Used to Be Archenemies	Series composition and screenwriting	
2025	BanG Dream! Ave Mujica	Series composition and screenwriter	
2025	Li'l Miss Vampire Can't Suck Right	Series composition	
2025	You and Idol Precure	Screenwriter	
2026	Kaiju Girl Caramelise	Series composition	
2027	Ore to Yu Nii!	Series composition	

=== Original video animation ===
Year	Title	Notes	Ref.
2012	Hori-san to Miyamura-kun	Series composition, screenplay	

=== Animated film ===
Year	Title	Ref.
2020	Given	
2021	BanG Dream! Episode of Roselia (as script supervisor)	
2021	Kin-iro Mosaic: Thank You!!	
2022	BanG Dream! Poppin'Dream!	

=== Stage productions ===
Year	Title	Ref.
2024	Butai: Sasayaku yō ni Koi wo Utau	
