= List of The Seven Deadly Sins characters =

The members of the titular order of The Seven Deadly Sins. Clockwise from bottom left: Meliodas, Ban, King, Escanor, Diane, Merlin and Gowther.

The Seven Deadly Sins manga series features a cast of characters created by Nakaba Suzuki. Set in a fictitious Britannia in a time period akin to the European Middle Ages, the story references various traditions, including Christianity (e.g., the Seven Deadly Sins, the Ten Commandments) and Arthurian legend (e.g., Meliodas, Diane, Ban, Harlequin, Gowther, Merlin and Escanor). This is frequently done in ironic or contradictory ways, such as in the emergence of the title group as the protagonists and the group of "Holy Knights" as the antagonists of the series.

In accordance with the medieval theme, many of The Seven Deadly Sins are depicted as knights, who are clad in stylized variations of medieval armor, many of whom perform magic. The five major clans in the series are Humans, Giants, Fairies, Goddesses, and Demons, all of which possess powerful abilities and magical powers. Suzuki's sequel to the manga, Four Knights of the Apocalypse, continues these Christian and Arthurian references (e.g., the Four Horsemen of the Apocalypse and Percival).

== Creation ==
In order to surprise readers, Nakaba Suzuki purposely made the appearances of some of the titular group of knights very different from their wanted posters that appear in the first chapter and had others look the same as their poster, but gave them "horrible" personalities. Although it was decided to make the protagonist of the series a "child", Suzuki struggled with designing Meliodas' profile because the character is actually an adult. He said the most difficult part was his hair; ultimately deciding on "fluffy" hair like a boy from a foreign country, which he had never done before. In the pilot chapter, the character had long, straight hair, which the author said was not as cute. Because he did not want them to have too much vitality, Suzuki originally planned for Meliodas to have "dot eyes", which he associates with strong characters, such as Ban, Tristan from his first serialized manga Rising Impact, and the titular character from his work Kongō Banchō. But he worried readers would not take Meliodas seriously as the main character and realized "shining eyes" were better because he is more of the "shōnen type". In the published one-shot version, Hawk and his mother did not appear. Instead, Melodas' traveling tavern, named "Apple", rode atop a giant spider-like mechanism. Suzuki said he always made sure to show the subtly different relationships between the members of the titular group of knights. For example, he said that while Ban is Meliodas' best friend, King is only a teammate with whom he does not talk. All seven have such relationships, which the author called realistically human. Because he felt it would be too convenient to have seven enemies oppose the Seven Deadly Sins and fight them one-on-one, Suzuki decided on having ten with the Ten Commandments. This way, characters could fail and there would be another who can defeat many by themselves, making it unpredictable for readers. However, the author has stated that Escanor ended up being "too strong".

The initial design for Diane was slightly smaller than the final version and had disheveled hair instead of pigtails. Suzuki explained that his editor at the time was worried about her being too big, thus they were going to go with about two meters tall. But that is not uncommon for women in manga and the author recognized that the fantasy manga was being overcome by a concern about reality. Although that version of Diane still had a crush on Meliodas, she was more hot and cold about it. Ban's initial design was very different from the final version. He did not talk much, always wore a poker face and had a personality that was difficult to "rile up". King was initially going to be named "Jehan" and represent the sin of pride. Instead of transforming into an old fat guy, the initial design transformed into a pudgy baby. But his editor at the time pointed out this looked too much like Gawain from Rising Impact. Additionally, because having a kid turn into an old guy is "kind of cliché", the author considered having the old guy be King's main form, before deciding against it. The prototype design for Gowther was that of a warlock named "Jeema", who represented the sin of sloth and who was one of the Seven Deadly Sins whose job it was to secretly protect Meliodas. He eventually evolved into a giant clad in armor, before Suzuki felt that would be boring and changed him into the final version of a glasses-wearing youth. The author modeled Gowther's appearance on a girl he had a crush on, but always drew him as male. Merlin's prototype wore glasses and originally went by the mythical figure's Welsh name, "Myrddin".

Rejected designs for Matrona included making her look very similar to Diane, and making her rugged to the point she looked like an older man. Suzuki's personal favorite was scrapped for looking too similar to Derieri, and a rotund one was adapted into the design for Dolores. Dolores and Selion were originally planned to be alive and to participate in the second Fighting Festival held in Vaizel. The former was going to have a different, slimmer appearance as well as a different personality, while the latter was to be the spitting image of his father Zhivago. But Suzuki scrapped these ideas for being too convenient and due to the question on whether or not they could "keep up". In order to distinguish between Jenna and Zaneri, the former wears a miniskirt and has a combative look, while the latter wears a long skirt and has downcast eyes. The designs of Zeldris, Derieri, Melascula, Gloxinia and Galland were finalized quickly, although the last was originally going to have a more human build. Estarossa ended up looking very similar to Meliodas' wanted poster. A Ten Commandments design of a Demon with two bodies as one was reworked into two separate vampires that appear in the three-chapter "The Vampire of Edinburgh".

For the anime adaptation, Suzuki initially imagined Meliodas would be played by a female voice actress due to him being "an adult, but [also] a boy". But after listening to samples, he said Yuki Kaji was the only suitable candidate. Because he also voices Meliodas' brother Zeldris, Kaji asked Suzuki for advice on how to play the two characters.

== Main The Seven Deadly Sins characters ==
=== Seven Deadly Sins ===
The Seven Deadly Sins (七つの大罪, Nanatsu no Taizai) were the strongest and most menacing order of Holy Knights in the Liones Kingdom, composed of seven brutal criminals^{[ch. 1]} from various races who were branded with symbols of beasts to symbolize the sin that motivated their crimes. Each member of the group had the highest Holy Knight ranking, Diamond, and each possessed a unique weapon known as a Sacred Treasure (神器, Jingi) that was given to them by King Liones.^{[ch. 27]} Ten years before the series began, they were branded traitors for having allegedly assassinated Zaratras, captain of the Holy Knights, in an attempted coup d'état.^{[ch. 5]} The Seven Deadly Sins are eventually absolved of their crimes after liberating Liones from rule of the Holy Knights.

==== Meliodas ====
Voiced by: Yuki Kaji (Japanese); Bryce Papenbrook (English)

Meliodas (メリオダス, Meriodasu) is the captain of the Seven Deadly Sins who bears the Dragon Sin of Wrath, symbolized by a dragon on his left shoulder. When found by Elizabeth at the start of the series, he is running the traveling bar Boar Hat (豚の帽子, Buta no Bōshi) with his pig companion Hawk. Despite his nickname, Meliodas typically wears the façade of a foolish trickster more interested in fondling women than fighting, displaying wrath only when those dear to him are endangered or killed. Despite his adolescent appearance, Meliodas is actually a Demon who is over three thousand years old. He is immensely powerful and agile, and his signature ability Full Counter (全反撃(フルカウンター), Furu Kauntā) reflects magical attacks at the attacker with far greater power. Meliodas can also tap into his demonic power, manifesting versatile dark energy from his body to increase his offense and defense at the cost of entering a berserker state. Meliodas initially carries a sword hilt called the Dragon Handle before it is stolen by Helbram, where it is revealed to be a fragment of the Coffin of Eternal Darkness, which was used to seal away the Demon clan. He later regains his Sacred Treasure Demon Sword Lostvayne (魔剣ロストヴェイン, Maken Rosutovu~ein), a curved short-sword that allows him to create up to four weaker clones of himself that compensate for their lack of power by allowing him to use Full Counter to its full potential.

Meliodas is revealed to be the son of the Demon King and the original leader of the Ten Commandments, possessing the fragment of his father's soul embodying Love.^{[vol. 34]} But Meliodas turned his back on his people when he fell in love with the Goddess Elizabeth, killing two of his fellow Commandments and causing the Holy War to occur.^{[vol. 22]} The Demon King allowed the Supreme Deity of the Goddess Race to curse Meliodas with immortality. In contrast, the Demon King himself cursed Elizabeth with perpetual death and reincarnation to make his son suffer every time he is reunited with her.^{[vol. 27]} Due to the curse's nature, Meliodas' soul ends up in Purgatory with the Demon King feasting on his emotions before reviving him, gradually reverting to his former self as a result.^{[vol. 24]} Meliodas has a brother, Zeldris, whom he ends up fighting to surpass their father. After Elizabeth begins regaining her memories as the goddess Elizabeth, which means she will die in three days, Meliodas resolves to become the new demon king to break their curses. He disbands the Deadly Sins and enters an alliance with Zeldris after promising to use his status to release his brother's lover, revealing that he has absorbed the Commandment of Pacifism and intends to absorb the other commandments.^{[vol. 30]} Despite becoming a vessel for the Demon King before managing to force him out of his body, Meliodas frees himself and Elizabeth from their curses, though he would leave the living world because of his power as a Demon King. ^{[vol. 36, 37]} But the victory is short-lived as the Demon King possesses Zeldris and restores Elizabeth's curse, prompting the Sins' final battle with the Demon King.^{[vol. 38]} After killing his father, Meliodas sacrifices his Demon King powers to destroy the Commandments to prevent the Demon King from reviving.^{[vol. 40]} In the series epilogue, Meliodas married Elizabeth and became the ruler of Liones with a son named Tristan.^{[vol. 41]}. During the events of Four Knights of the Apocalypse, Meliodas tasked Tristan and Lancelot to find the remaining members of the titular group to stop Arthur and save Britannia. Meliodas came in fifth place in a 2014 character popularity poll for the series.

==== Diane ====
Voiced by: Aoi Yūki (Japanese); Erica Mendez (English)

Diane (ディアンヌ, Diannu) is a member of the Seven Deadly Sins who bears the Serpent Sin of Envy, symbolized by a serpent on her left thigh. Standing thirty-feet tall, she is a 750-year-old member of the Giant clan from the village Mega Dozer. Unlike her more violent kinsmen who make a living as mercenaries, Diane dislikes fighting. Having run away from home, she came upon King by chance, and the two spent five centuries together before he erased her memories of him, and she returned to her tribe.^{[vol. 10]} After becoming an apprentice of her chieftain Matrona, Diane accompanied her when hired by a Holy Knight unit. However, the knights actually intended to kill the two giants, and Matrona seemingly dies from being poisoned while slaughtering 330 knights. But the surviving knights blame Diane, claiming she killed Matrona in envy of her strength, and she is sentenced to be beheaded before being recruited by Meliodas to join the Deadly Sins.^{[vol. 16:Girls Have Impossible Dreams]} Following the Deadly Sins' disbandment, she hid in the Forest of White Dreams before Meliodas and Elizabeth recruit her. Diane has feelings for the former for treating her like an equal and being initially jealous whenever he flirts with Elizabeth.^{[vol. 1, 2]} But after being impressed with Elizabeth's selflessness, Diane becomes very good friends with Elizabeth. She eventually regains her childhood memories of King and forms a relationship with him, eventually getting married after the Deadly Sins disband despite the ceremony being disrupted by the Supreme Being's attempt to bring about a new Holy War. As revealed in Four Knights of the Apocalypse, Diane bore King about seven children with their oldest being Nasiens.

As a Giant, Diane is incredibly strong with a deep connection to nature which allows her to manipulate the earth with her race's ability, Creation (創造(クリエイション), Kurieishon). Diane retains her strength and agility even when shrunk to human-size, achieved either by being sprayed by a rare mushroom or taking pills created by Merlin from said mushroom, including hardening her skin via Heavy Metal (重金属(ヘビメタ), Hebi Meta), thereby making it as hard as iron to enhance her durability and strengthen attacks.^{[vol. 5]} Her Sacred Treasure is Gideon (戦鎚ギデオン), a 2,200-pound war hammer that enhances Diane's earth manipulation powers to a point where a single swing can lift a mountain into the air.^{[ch. 30]} Diane came in seventh place in a 2014 character popularity poll for the series.

==== Ban ====
Voiced by: Tatsuhisa Suzuki, Sora Amamiya (young) (Japanese); Benjamin Diskin, Tara Sands (young) (English)

Ban (バン) is a member of the Seven Deadly Sins who bears the Fox Sin of Greed, symbolized by a fox on his left waist. Having drunk from the Fountain of Youth, he is immortal, earning him the nickname "Undead Ban" (不死身の(アンデッド)バン). Despite being a good-natured person, he is infamous as a legendary bandit. He had taken to a life of thievery at a young age under the tutelage of Zhivago. 20 years before the series began, Ban learned of the Fountain of Youth and attempted to become immortal so he would live long enough for "something good to happen to him".^{[vol. 4:Ban the Bandit]} However, he changed his mind when the fountain's guardian Elaine revealed the forest would die if he drank the liquid. After falling in love over seven days, Ban and Elaine were fatally wounded by a red demon. However, Elaine saved Ban by giving him the liquid from the fountain through a kiss, making him immortal.^{[vol. 4:Ban the Bandit]} As she was dying, she gave him a seed, which he uses to create a new Sacred Tree. Ban was falsely imprisoned by the Liones Kingdom for destroying and stealing from the previous fountain, and killing Elaine; four years later, he was recruited by Meliodas after surviving numerous executions.^{[ch. 34]} Following the Deadly Sins' disbandment, Ban allowed himself to be captured and held captive within Baste Dungeon, which he escaped occasionally so he could tend to the Sacred Tree. He is nicknamed "Fairy King Ban" by the Fairy Folk for his actions.^{[ch. 105]} He eventually rejoins the Deadly Sins and serves as cook in the Boar Hat, whilst getting into occasional confrontations with Meliodas and King. During the new Holy War, after returning from Purgatory with Meliodas' emotions, Ban uses his experience there to transfer his immortality into Elaine to save her life.^{[vol. 36]} In the series epilogue, Ban married Elaine and they now have a son named Lancelot.^{[vol. 41]} While immortal, unaffected by fatigue or need of sustenance, Ban can heal his body regardless of any severe wound with his blood have healing properties. While Ban sacrificed his immortality, his body became highly durable from his myriad of years in Purgatory's unforgiving environment. His trademark ability is Snatch (強奪(スナッチ), Sunatchi), which allows him to rob others of their possessions and even physical abilities as he can temporarily sap another's physical strength and speed. Ban is also skilled with weaponry, particularly with a three-section staff. His Sacred Treasure Courechouse (聖棍クレシューズ) is a four-sectioned staff that was stolen from him during the Deadly Sins' disbandment; the culprit revealed to be Merlin when she returns it to him during the final battle with the Demon King. By the events of Four Knights of the Apocalypse, Ban married Elaine and raises their son Lancelot as king of Benwick. Ban is a popular character in the series, coming in fifth place in a 2014 character popularity poll.

==== King ====
Voiced by: Jun Fukuyama (Japanese); Max Mittelman (English)

King (キング, Kingu), real name Harlequin (ハーレクイン, Hārekuin), is a member of the Seven Deadly Sins who bears the Grizzly Sin of Sloth, symbolized by a grizzly bear above his left ankle. He is the 1,300-year-old, third king of the Fairy race. He is portrayed as the group's 'straight man' while often getting caught up in the others' shenanigans. Originally the third king of the Fairy King's Forest, King forsook his Fairy King duties 700 years ago, when he left the domain to rescue his friend Helbram from human abductors and was saved by Diane after being inflicted with amnesia-inducing injuries. Centuries after regaining his memories and realizing his amnesia was caused by a maddened Helbram, King is forced to kill his friend to cease his human-killing spree. He then erased Diane's memories of him before being sentenced by Liones to a 1,000-year imprisonment for failing to stop Helbram in time and abandoning his duties as king, with the Fairy King's Forest eventually being destroyed by a demon that would kill his sister Elaine.^{[vol. 10]} After joining the Seven Deadly Sins, King would occasionally disguise himself as a slovenly over-weighted man to keep Diane from remembering him. Following the Deadly Sins' disbandment, King finally learned of his homeland's destruction while believing Ban was responsible. He crosses paths with the Sins when they heard he took refuge in the Necropolis, rejoining the group once learning the truth behind his sister's death.^{[vol. 4]} Despite Diane's affection for Meliodas, King remains devoted to her, and she eventually regains her memories of their time together. By the events of Four Knights of the Apocalypse, King married Diane and started a family with her.

Like members of the Fairy race, King has the ability to levitate and float through the air, as well as being able to levitate certain objects and manipulate their trajectory without the need of making physical contact. King also possesses a Sacred Treasure called Spirit Spear, Chastiefol (霊槍シャスティフォル, Reisō Shasutiforu). A spear crafted from a sacred tree only found in the Fairy Realm, it is much stronger than steel and possesses the mysterious qualities of the tree, which King's ability, Disaster (災厄(ディザスター), Dizasutā), draws out. At will, King can instantly change Chastiefol into one of several different forms, including a pillow which can act as a shield, different forms of spears (one of which can turn an enemy to stone), a massive flower sprouted from the earth that projects an enormous energy beam, and even a large stuffed bear. But despite his impressive magical abilities and able to move at speeds while in midair, King is physically weak and unable to hold his own in a fight while unarmed. King was voted the most popular character by a large margin in a 2014 character poll for the series, with close to four times as many votes as second place.

==== Gowther ====
Voiced by: Yuhei Takagi (Japanese); Erik Scott Kimerer (English)

Gowther (ゴウセル, Gōuseru) is a member of the Seven Deadly Sins who bears the Goat Sin of Lust, symbolized by a goat on his right breast. He is an androgynous and bespectacled bookworm with pink hair who originally clad himself in a massive suit of armor Merlin designed to stabilize his power due to his unstable mind. He is first seen as emotionless and analytically stoic while also very socially inept as his curiosity often has him performing highly questionable actions, such as manipulating the memories of others. At the time he was discovered, being a skilled actor when he feels like it, he was living as Pelio's servant under the alias Armand (アーマンド, Āmando), or "Alan" (アラン, Aran) in the anime adaptation. Gowther's special ability, Invasion (侵入(インベイション), Inbeishon), is a versatile ability that enables him to invade a person's mind and manipulate it in various ways that include memory alteration, forcing opponents to relive their worse moments, and telepathically relaying coordinated battle plans to his allies almost instantaneously. As a doll, Gowther has a high level of resilience to attacks normally fatal to humans like decapitation. His Sacred Treasure is Dual Bow Herritt (双弓ハーリット), which takes the form of twin bows made of light which greatly enhances the spread and range of his Invasion. Like Hawk, Gowther is equipped with a Balor's Evil Eye that allows him to detect the overall power level of anyone in his vicinity.

Gowther is later revealed to be an animated doll created by his namesake, a demon sorcerer forced to bear the Demon King's soul fragment bearing Selflessness, which causes those inflicted by it to lose their sense of self. He was modeled after his creator's lover, Glariza, and used to serve as his proxy in the Ten Commandments. Gowther received free will before helping his creator end the Holy War by rewriting Mael's identity.^{[vol. 34]} Gowther disappeared afterward, found centuries later in the cellar of Liones Castle by Princess Nadja, whom Gowther fell in love with. While Nadja returned the sentiment, she died from an illness of the heart while resting against Gowther. In the manga, this was a result of the couple engaging in romantic relations together, after which Nadja expired. Gowther tried reviving her with his magic heart, a charm that he was told gives him his emotions, but it failed to resurrect her while making it appear that he had sadistically raped then murdered her. Gowther accepted the blame for his "crime of lust" out of guilt, discarding his magic heart to render himself emotionless to no longer feel the pain of losing Nadja. It was only after learning that King and Diane were searching for his magic heart that Gowther learned that it was only a placebo to begin with and begins accepting his emotions, allowing him to be more sociable while using his power to its full extent without trouble. By the events of Four Knights of the Apocalypse, Gowther became a mentor to Tristan while looking after the demons that took refuge on Britannia. Gowther is a popular character in the series, coming in third place in a 2014 character popularity poll.

==== Merlin ====
Voiced by: Maaya Sakamoto (Japanese); Lauren Landa (English)

Merlin (マーリン, Mārin) is a cool and calculative member of the Deadly Sins who bears the Boar Sin of Gluttony, symbolized by a boar above her neck. Normally in the form of an attractive raven-haired woman in skimpy clothing, Merlin is a 3,000-year-old witch known as the "Daughter of Bérialin" (ベリアルインの娘) as her true name is unpronounceable by humans. Trained by her father the chief sage and the demon wizard Gowther, Merlin possessed vast magical potential and was raised as a weapon for her peoples' use against the higher ranking goddesses and demons. She fled Bérialin and crossed paths with Meliodas, with whom she fell in love, motivating her to assume an adult form and use a combination of the Infinity and Chrono Coffin (時の棺(クロノ・コフィン), Kurono Kofin) spells to render herself an ageless immortal.^{[ch. 337]} She bore no animosity towards Meliodas and Elizabeth when they fell in love with each other, treating the latter like a sister. Merlin lives up to her sin with her obsession of filling the void in her heart when she learned of Chaos and resolves to release the entity from its seal, causing Bérialin's destruction when exploited the recruitment attempts of the Demon King and the Supreme Deity to increase her power with added immunity to their factions' powers.

After enlisting Dubs to create the Coffin of Eternal Darkness in order to seal away the Demons and the Supreme Deity, Merlin wandered Britannia before reuniting with Meliodas and helping him establish the Seven Deadly Sins as a means to eliminate either the Demon King or the Supreme Deity to cause the imbalance needed for her agenda. When the Sins were accused of killing Zaratras, Merlin knocked Meliodas out to extract most of his power as a precautionary measure due to the wrath and destruction Meliodas released upon the death of one of Elizabeth's reincarnations. Before returning to the Sins, Merlin positioned herself as mentor to a young Arthur Pendragon. While on somewhat friendly terms with the other Deadly Sins, Merlin seemed to particularly enjoy Escanor's unrequited feelings for her. Following the death of the Demon King, having influenced events of the group's final battles by reactivating Elizabeth's reincarnation curse, Merlin reveals her true reasons for aiding the Sins when she conducts a ritual to resurrect Arthur as a vessel of Chaos. The other Sins felt betrayed after learning Merlin's story from the Lady of the Lake, but eventually forgive her with Melodias telling her to take responsibility for whatever results from her actions.^{[ch. 335, 337]} Merlin went into hiding prior to the beginning Four Knights of the Apocalypse, with Arthur turning a captive fairy into a copy of Merlin that he keeps for company before killing the fairy upon Guinevere seeing through the deception.^{[ch. 91]} It would later be revealed that Merlin, through a puppet body, is hiding away in the household of Kay while entrusting him to raise her daughter Gawain.

Merlin has mastery over a vast repertoire of spells with flight, illusions, and telekinesis among them. She can maintain any spell indefinitely regardless of its magical cost through her ability Infinity (無限(インフィニティ), Infiniti). Through the Demon King's and Supreme Deity's boons, with immunity to being manipulated by goddesses and any form of curse, Merlin acquires spells exclusive to the Demon and Goddess races like Perfect Cube, a Demon spell which encases and traps a small area in a cube-like barrier that is impervious to virtually any attack. Merlin's Sacred Treasure is a crystal ball known as Morning Star Aldan (明星アルダン, Myōjō Arudan), which allows her to perceive anything or transfer her consciousness into it, which she makes use of when her body is temporarily turned to stone by Galland's commandment. Merlin came in eighteenth place in a 2014 character popularity poll for the series.

==== Escanor ====
Voiced by: Tomokazu Sugita, Sara Matsumoto (young) (Japanese); Kyle Hebert, Kira Buckland (young) (English)

Escanor (エスカノール, Esukanōru) is a member of the Seven Deadly Sins who bears the Lion Sin of Pride, symbolized by a lion on his back. Born a prince of the Kingdom of Tarim,^{[vol. 39:The King Sings Alone]} he was disowned and driven from his homeland due to his inability to control his monstrous strength, with his maid Rosa helping him escape via the sea in a barrel.^{[ch. 169]} He traveled in solitude due to being feared before being recruited as the final member of the Seven Deadly Sins, who made him feel welcome as he fell in love with Merlin and later played a role in devastating Edinburgh Castle during the Deadly Sins' battle with the vampires. Following the group's disbandment 10 years ago, Escanor opened a secret tavern in a mountain cave where he remains until Ban finds him by accident, at which point he rejoins the Deadly Sins.

Despite his usual scrawny appearance, Escanor possesses Sunshine (太陽(サンシャイン), Sanshain), which is later revealed to be the lost Grace of the Archangel Mael. It enhances Escanor's physique during the day before reaching his full power for one minute at noon when the sun is at its zenith, exceeding every living being on the planet as power incarnate known as "The One" (天上天下唯我独尊(ザ・ワン), Za Wan). It also causes Escanor's body to radiate immense heat that he can store in his Sacred Treasure Sacred Axe Ritta (神斧リッタ, Jinpu Ritta), a massive, ornate one-handed axe with a crescent blade.^{[ch. 170]} But continued use of Sunshine gradually damages Escanor's body, eventually reducing him to ashes in the aftermath of the group's final battle against the Demon King.^{[ch. 253]} But, the events of Four Knights of the Apocalypse reveal that Merlin revived Escanor in an artificial body with Gawain being their biological daughter. Escanor came in twenty-eighth place in a 2014 character popularity poll for the series.

=== Elizabeth Liones ===
Voiced by: Sora Amamiya (Japanese); Erika Harlacher (English)

Elizabeth Liones (エリザベス・リオネス, Erizabesu Rionesu) is the 16-year-old third princess of Liones. Originally from the Kingdom of Danafor before it was destroyed, she was adopted by Bartra Liones. She becomes an ally of the Seven Deadly Sins when seeking their help after the Great Holy Knights seized control of the kingdom, serving as a waitress in Meliodas' bar. Despite being frail and not a fighter, Elizabeth is very courageous and willing to protect others at the cost of her own well-being. Still, she is fairly gullible and easily influenced, often tricked by Meliodas' jokes. She does not seem to mind how often he caresses and gropes her, and has even fallen in love with him due to a sense of familiarity with and nostalgia for him.

Elizabeth is later revealed to be the 107th reincarnation of the Goddess Elizabeth, known as Bloodstained Ellie for her rarely seen violent streak before meeting Meliodas with their love causing the Holy War between their races. Elizabeth was killed near the war's end when she and Meliodas are attacked by their parents for their love, Elizabeth cursed by the Demon King to endlessly reincarnate as a human. The curse serves to torment Meliodas as Elizabeth would die within three days of regaining her powers and memories. In her current life, Elizabeth's latent power manifested in her ability to heal living things with tears from her right eye, manifesting more of her power in times of stress. Elizabeth eventually regains full memory of her previous incarnations and her full Goddess power is unleashed, activating her curse as the New Holy War is about to commence. This forces Meliodas to take a gambit of acquiring his father's power to break Elizabeth's curse, with Merlin briefly restoring the curse in secret as a means to force Meliodas to kill his father. Following the Sins disbanding, Elizabeth succeeds her father as queen of Liones with Meliodas as her husband. Elizabeth came in tenth place in a 2014 character popularity poll for the series.

=== Hawk ===
Voiced by: Misaki Kuno (Japanese); Cristina Valenzuela (English)

Hawk (ホーク, Hōku) is a talking Gloucestershire Old Spots pig and Meliodas's companion, who introduces himself as captain of the "Knighthood of Scraps Disposal" (残飯処理騎士団) as he eats the leftovers and table scraps from Boar Hat. Years before the series began, Hawk found Meliodas collapsed and the two established the mobile bar together, which resides on-top of Hawk's gigantic mother.^{[vol. 12:Partners]} They often engage in harmless banter, with Hawk frequently seen scolding Meliodas for his perverted actions towards Elizabeth. Though mostly serving as comic relief by acting overly arrogant, he yet aids Elizabeth and the Deadly Sins several times, utilizing headbutts and other modest attacks on weaker enemies and transporting wounded allies. Hawk sacrifices himself to block a fatal attack of Hendrickson's aimed at Meliodas, and his death causes much anguish for Elizabeth and the Deadly Sins.^{[ch. 96]} But he mysteriously revives from his remains as a piglet, before regaining his normal size after eating pills Merlin creates for Gowther.^{[ch. 112]} Besides Meliodas, Hawk gets along particularly well with Ban and Merlin. The latter equips him with Balor's Evil Eye (バロールの魔眼), a new ear tag that allows him to see the power levels of anyone he observes.^{[ch. 106]} During his training in Istal, Hawk learns that he temporarily acquires the traits of whatever magical creature he eats, obtaining their powers until he digests them. It is later revealed that Hawk is actually Mild (マイルド, Mairudo), a denizen of Purgatory and the younger brother of Wild, the latest creature that the Demon King used as a means of spying on Meliodas. Hawk came in eleventh place in a 2014 character popularity poll for the series.

== Main Four Knights of the Apocalypse characters ==
=== Four Knights of the Apocalypse ===
The Four Knights of the Apocalypse (黙示録の四騎士, Mokushiroku no Yonkishi) are an order of Holy Knights that serve as the protagonists of the sequel series. They are described to possess unique powers and are prophesied by King Arthur Pendragon to bring destruction to the kingdom of Camelot and kill him.

==== Percival ====
Voiced by: Shō Komura (Japanese); Edward Mendoza (English)

Percival (パーシバル, Pāshibaru) is the Knight of Death, later revealed to be a Life Spirit bond to a dead infant in an experiment Ironside conducted in an attempt to save his son Diodora by creating an immortal body. Varghese spirited Percival to raise the boy as his grandson in isolation on the Finger of God (神の指, Kami no Yubi) until Ironside arrived on Percival's 16th birthday and killed Varghese. Percival leaves his home to track down his father, getting caught up in Britannia's war with Camelot while entrusted with Meliodas's Dragon Handle after Howzer reforged it into a functional sword.

He possesses the ability Hope (希望(ホープ), Hōpu), using his comrades' faith in him to utilizes the Life Spirits' power of "Eternal Return", giving him power of manipulate life to create golems from his magic or revive himself. But this also allows Percival to drain his opponents' vital energy, which he used when he assumed his friends were killed by the Tristan Platoon. When Percival eventually learned his origins, he is driven by guilt over being the cause of Ironside's madness and fear for his friends to discard his body and resume existence as a Life Spirit. But his body entered a state of suspended animation before returning to it two years later and later receiving the sword Force Circular from Dubs.

==== Lancelot ====
Voiced by: Koki Uchiyama (Japanese); Aleks Le (English)

Lancelot (ランスロット, Ransurotto) is the Knight of War and half-fairy son of Ban and Elaine. He possessed his mother's ability to hear the hearts of others along with the ability to transform himself from human to fairy form. He later became affiliated with Liones and has been tasked by Meliodas to find those prophesied to become the Four Knights of the Apocalypse, assuming the identity of a talking fox named Sin (シン, Shin) to act without being discovered by Camelot's forces. He guides Percival to Liones to help him hone his strength before revealing his true identity.

==== Tristan ====
Voiced by: Ayumu Murase, Mikako Komatsu (child) (Japanese); Jeannie Tirado (English)

Tristan Liones (トリスタン = リオネス, Torisutan Rionesu) is the Knight of Pestilence and prince of Liones due to being the son of Meliodas and Elizabeth. The protagonist of the two-part film The Seven Deadly Sins: Grudge of Edinburgh, he is a Nephilim, inheriting the evil and holy powers of his parents' clans. When he was meeting his father's comrades on his tenth birthday, Tristan learns of the Sins' exploits and resolves to become a Holy Knight like them.^{[vol. 41]} As the prince of Liones, he leads his personal Holy Knight order known as the Tristan Platoon. Gawain often sees in him a one-sided rival due to the fact that his knightly abilities often hurt her inferiority complex. What only intensifies the stress between them is the affections of Isolde. This conflict is a semi-serious representation of one of the versions of Tristan and Isolde, where Gawain acts as an antagonist and opponent of Tristan in matters of knightly ideals.

==== Gawain ====
Voiced by: Fairouz Ai (Japanese); Nicole Gose (English)

Gawain (ガウェイン, Gawein) is the Knight of Famine and the only female member of the Four Knights, possessing the ability Dawn that is similar to Mael's Sunshine abilities and carries the Divine Sword Litta (神剣リッタ, Shinken Ritta), a sword created a fragment of Escanor's divine axe with many of the same abilities. While raised by Arthur's brother Kay Pendragon, Gawain is actually the daughter of Escanor and Merlin with the two posing as her grandparents. But her upbringing gave her a superiority complex with the belief that she is the strongest of the Four, mentally regressing into a temperamental child whenever her confidence is broken. Her image in the manga and anime is based on different versions of the same knight of the Matter of Britain. In particular, the tension between her and Tristan over Isolde and personal ambitions refers to one of the versions of Tristan and Isolde, which show Gawain as a villain. Although story has not yet investigated her sexual identity or romantic relationships, Gawain openly shows interest in other girls, inspired by the womanizer image of one of the versions of the original literary character (in particular, trying to flirt with Isolde), which makes her the first openly queer characters in Main Cast of the series.

=== Percival Platoon ===
The Percival Platoon (パーシヴァル小隊, Pāshivu~aru Shōtai) consists of Perceval's traveling companions during his journey to Liones, appointed as Holy Knights by Meliodas after Arthur's attack on the kingdom.

Donny
Voiced by: Kikunosuke Toya (Japanese); Ryan Colt Levy (English)

Donny (ドニー, Donī) is a cowardly failed Holy Knight trainee, later revealed to be Howser's nephew, who joins Percival by accident while traveling as part of a circus troupe. He has the power of telekinesis, which he initially mistakes as an ability that simply makes objects float in place, and is a highly skilled knife wielder.

Nasiens
Voiced by: Aino Shimada (Japanese); Marin Miller (English)

Nasiens (ナシエンス, Nashiensu) is a herbalist from Echo Gorge who works in creating drugs and poisons, befriending Percival and affectionately viewing him as their guinea pig. Their magic is "Mix Venom", which allows them to safely consume any poison and create their own with various properties, sometimes enchanting the dagger "Henbane" and shortsword "Belladonna" with them. They later gain the fairy clan's ability to levitate after channeling the spirit spear chastiefol against one of the four evils, Worreldane. They later learn that they are the long-lost child of King and Diane, having ended up in Echo Gorge after someone replaced him with Mertyl. Due to their fairy genes they don't have a gender, until they fall in love with someone. In the anime series, Nasiens reveals they have feelings for Percival.

Anghalhad
Voiced by: Kanna Nakamura (Japanese); Emi Lo (English)

Anghalhad (アングハルハッド, Anguharuhaddo), nicknamed "Anne" (アン, An), is the governor's daughter from the town of Sistana, and is an aspiring Holy Knight and fencer. She has the gift to sense when others are lying or have hidden intentions, making her distrustful of others, but learns to overcome her skepticism when she meets Percival, who lacks any sense of deceit. Her power later evolves to the point that those who lie, including herself, will be brutally crushed under intense gravity, the power relenting when the affected tell the truth or Anne loses consciousness.

=== Tristan Platoon ===
The Tristan Platoon (トリスタン小隊, Torisutan Shōtai) is an order of Holy Knights led by Tristan.

Chion
Voiced by: Soma Saito (Japanese); Paul Castro Jr. (English)

Chion (キオン, Kion) is Gilthunder and Margaret's son who is devoted to his cousin, Prince Tristan, but treats the other Knights of the Apocalypse with suspicion as he always has the worst-case scenario in mind. His negative attitude is largely due to the disturbing influence Vivian had on him during the critical moments of his childhood. He is able to summon elemental spirits to aid him in combat.

Isolde
Voiced by: Atsumi Tanezaki (Japanese); Kate Clarke (English)

Isolde (イゾルデ, Izorude) is an over-six-foot-tall female knight her ability is called Love Bomb which can create explosions born from her love for Tristan. She is temperamental and feels affection towards Tristan, but is insecure due to her height. She is based on the famous love interest of Tristan, Isolde. Although in this version she herself is a masculine knight and is initially open about her feelings for Tristan. Isolde is friends with Gawain and is aware of the attraction of the latter to her, although she does not pay attention to them.

Jade
Voiced by: Shugo Nakamura (Japanese); A.J. Beckles (English)

Jade (ジェイド, Jeido) is Chion's childhood friend. His power, Monochrome, can create orbs of darkness around his opponents' heads to block their vision, or generate blinding light.

== Liones Kingdom ==
The Liones Kingdom (リオネス王国, Rionesu Ōkoku) is the setting for most of the story. Days before the beginning of the series, the country's Holy Knights staged a coup d'état and took control of Liones.^{[ch. 1]} This causes the kingdom to fall into a state of distress as citizens from towns and villages are enslaved or forcefully recruited into joining the Holy Knights in preparation for a Holy War (聖戦, Seisen). The coup is later revealed to have been orchestrated by Hendrickson, via the machinations of the demon Fraudrin. Following Hendrickson's defeat, King Bartra pardons most of the knights as he prefers they atone for their actions.

=== Liones Royal Family ===
Bartra Liones
Voiced by: Rintarō Nishi, Yoshitaka Yamaya (young) (Japanese); Michael McConnohie, Brandon Winckler (young) (English)

Bartra Liones (バルトラ・リオネス, Barutora Rionesu) is the King of Liones and Elizabeth's adoptive father, who is held captive by the Holy Knights after their coup d'état. He possesses a power known as Vision (千里眼(ビジョン), Bijon), which bestows him some level of foresight for events which affect him and his surroundings.^{[ch. 83]} After Hendrickson's defeat, he forgives the Holy Knights since he knows they were being manipulated and that their strength would be needed in the upcoming New Holy War. Following the war's conclusion, Bartra steps down as king with Meliodas becoming his successor through the latter's marriage to Elizabeth.

Margaret Liones
Voiced by: Nana Mizuki (Japanese); Dorothy Elias-Fahn (English)

Margaret Liones (マーガレット・リオネス, Māgaretto Rionesu) is the First Princess of Liones and Elizabeth's eldest adoptive sister. Ten years prior to the beginning of the story, she witnessed the murder of Zaratras at the hands of Hendrickson and Dreyfus and told Gilthunder about it. Unfortunately, Hendrickson found out and she allowed herself to be imprisoned by the Holy Knights, who used her as a means to force Gilthunder into obeying Hendrickson. She is later possessed by Archangel Ludoshel due to her latent magical abilities for the New Holy War before Hendrickson manages to expel the Archangel from Margaret's body. After the war ends, Margaret and Gilthunder start a relationship while simultaneously refusing her father's initial offer of them becoming his successors.

Veronica Liones
Voiced by: Hisako Kanemoto (Japanese); Abby Trott (English)

Veronica Liones (ベロニカ・リオネス, Beronika Rionesu) is the Second Princess of Liones and Elizabeth's elder adoptive sister. She is described as a tomboy. As a child, she used to play swords with boys, which her father scolded her for. Despite sharing the Holy Knights' views on enslaving citizens, she deeply cares about Elizabeth. She sacrifices herself to protect Elizabeth, but recovers thanks to Elizabeth's power. It is shown that Veronica has feelings for her bodyguard and friend Griamore. Although initially unsure about how to proceed with these feelings, after Griamore is turned into a young boy, Veronica gives him a kiss and he returns to his regular self. They were trying to keep their relationship a secret but their families already knew.

Nadja Liones
Voiced by: Momo Asakura (Japanese); Xanthe Huynh (English)

Nadja Liones (ナージャ・リオネス, Nāja Rionesu) was the older sister of Bartra and Denzel Liones and the princess of the kingdom of Liones. She met Gowther after hearing one of her brother's visions about a person in a cavern underneath the castle. She went and explored herself, coming across Gowther who seemed to be waking up from a long sleep. She screamed in surprise when she first saw him due to being surprised by him appearing in front of her, though calmed down and began asking him questions and telling him where he was. When she headed back to the castle, she promised Gowther that she would return, comparing his excitement to that of a child's. She excitedly told Bartra about Gowther when she returned to the castle. Despite being happy for his sister, Bartra was worried about her due to her heart condition. The following morning, Gowther woke up to find Nadja dead, which left him in a horrified panic. In an attempt to save her, Gowther removed the heart inside of his chest to replace Nadja's with, tearing her chest open in order to do so. His distressed cries alerted the guards outside of the room, who burst in to discover a bloodied and naked Gowther on top of Nadja's unclothed body, mourning about how his heart had failed to revive her. The guards mistakenly considered that Gowther had raped and killed her, thus leading to his arrest and eventual death sentence by immolation.

=== Holy Knights ===
The Holy Knights (聖騎士, Seikishi) are the most powerful knights in the Kingdom of Liones, with each one said to rival an entire country's army in strength.^{[ch. 1]} At the beginning of the series, they have recently taken control of Liones via coup d'état. At the same time, Apprentice Holy Knights suddenly began acquiring massive power ups. These young knights are dubbed the New Generation (新世代, Shin Sedai), and are later revealed to be the result of human experiments with Red Demon blood.

Hendrickson
Voiced by: Yūya Uchida (Japanese); Kaiji Tang (English)

Hendrickson (ヘンドリクセン, Hendorikusen) is a captain of the Holy Knights alongside his friend Dreyfus. As a Druid child, he was forced to guard the recently buried dead until their bodies were reduced to bone, a task he hated; leading to the awakening of his power Acid (腐蝕(アシッド), Ashiddo), which allows him to control acid that can dissolve anything. He uses Druid techniques such as Purge (浄化(パージ), Pāji), which expels unnatural souls,^{[ch. 123]} and the forbidden Corpse Animation (死者使役, Shisha Shieki), which reanimates a corpse into a mindless puppet with their powers reduced.^{[ch. 86]}

Hendrickson aims to start a new Holy War by releasing the Demons race so the Holy Knights would once again have meaning and purpose.^{[ch. 61]} Using the corpse of the Red Demon that destroyed the Fairy King's Forest, he learned that its blood can enhance humans, a technique he perfected with the New Generation of Holy Knights, whose demon blood he can activate at will — which he does during the Sins' assault on the capital, turning the New Generation knights into monsters that wreak havoc until the Deadly Sins kill or rid them of the demons possessing their bodies.^{[ch. 85, 86]} Hendrickson has also completely assimilated himself with Red Demon blood, reattaching his severed arm as he becomes a youthful version of himself and kidnaps Elizabeth to complete his plan. After being cornered by the Deadly Sins, Hendrickson reveals to also possess the body of a more powerful Gray Demon and uses its blood to become a true demon before being defeated by Meliodas.^{[vol. 13]} It is revealed that Hendrickson and Dreyfus were both possessed by the demon Fraudin ten years ago, when he made them kill Zaratras.^{[ch. 124]} Having survived the attack by Meliodas, Hendrickson is healed by Fraudrin in Dreyfus' body.^{[ch. 108]} After releasing the Ten Commandments, Hendrickson, now freed of Fraudrin's influence and the Gray Demon blood, is spared by Fraudrin.^{[ch. 109]} Repentant, Hendrickson later comes to aid Gilthunder, Howzer and Griamore in defeating a Gray Demon, and aids the Seven Deadly Sins in their mission to face the Ten Commandments despite King still resenting him for using Helbram. In Four Knights of the Apocalypse, Hendrickson has become a doctor. Hendrickson came in fourth place in a 2014 character popularity poll for the series.

Dreyfus
Voiced by: Katsuyuki Konishi (Japanese); Jamieson Price (English)

Dreyfus (ドレファス, Dorefasu) is a captain of the Holy Knights alongside his friend Hendrickson. He is also Zaratras' younger half-brother, Griamore's father, and Gilthunder's uncle. He is a dignified and diligent person who is very dedicated to his duties. It is revealed that Dreyfus was possessed by the demon Fraudin, who assumed his identity while he and Hendrickson murdered Zaratras and framed the Sins. Dreyfus is eventually freed from Fraudin and seeks atonement for his role in the crisis that befell Britannia, inheriting some of Fraudin's power and knowledge of the Goddess race. He later retires after the Holy War's conclusion and becomes a sword fighting instructor. He possesses the power Break, an embodiment of his will, which is capable of shattering the opponent's techniques and has great destructive potential. In Four Knights of the Apocalypse, Dreyfus suffers from backache and gets treated by Hendrickson who has become a doctor.

Gilthunder
Voiced by: Mamoru Miyano, Kazutomi Yamamoto (Japanese); Robbie Daymond, Amanda C. Miller (young) (English)

Gilthunder (ギルサンダー, Girusandā) is a Holy Knight, Griamore's cousin, and Dreyfus's nephew who is the son of Zaratras'; he has the ability to use magic to generate and manipulate lightning. When Gilthunder was younger, he looked up to the Seven Deadly Sins and wanted to be just like them as he was trained by Meliodas. When Gilthunder learned of his father's murder by his uncle and Hendrickson, he was forced to follow the latter when Vivian uses her familiars on him and Margret to force him into compliance.^{[vol. 11]} He has since become emotionless while pursuing the Sins, cryptically hinting to Meliodas that he needs his help. Once Meliodas destroys the familiar following Margret, Gilthunder joins the Sins in fighting Hendrickson.^{[vol. 10, 13]} After Hendrickson's defeat, he, Howzer, and Griamore investigate the Demon clan's return to Britannia and later join forces with the Seven Deadly Sins to fight the Ten Commandments. By the events of Four Knights of the Apocalypse, Gillthunder married Margaret and raised their son Chion.

Guila
Voiced by: Mariya Ise (Japanese); Carrie Keranen (English)

Guila (ギーラ, Gīra) is a dedicated Holy Knight whose power of Explosion (爆炎(エクスプロージョン), Ekusupurōjon) allows her to create powerful explosions. She first appears as a New Generation whom the Deadly Sins encounter at the Necropolis when she places herself in a state of near-death to pursue them with her spirit.^{[ch. 21]} Guila joined the Holy Knights to be someone her little brother Zeal could be proud of after their father Dale mysteriously abandoned his post.^{[vol. 5:Her Justice]} Like Guila, her father was subject to Hendrickson's experiments with demon blood, becoming the Armor Giant in the Forest of Ordan.^{[ch. 57, 58]} She sides with the Sins after Diane risks her well-being to save Zeal from Helbram's attack.^{[vol. 9]} In Four Knights of the Apocalypse, Guila has the position of Vice Great Holy Knight of Liones. Being the only new generation Holy Knight to retain her demonic power, Guila mastered her ability and is able to assume a demon-like form.

Jericho
Voiced by: Marina Inoue (Japanese); Erica Lindbeck (7DS) Morgan Lauré Garrett (4KOA) (English)

Jericho (ジェリコ, Jeriko) is initially an apprentice Holy Knight under the Weird Fangs in Baste Prison.^{[ch. 9]} She is a skilled swordswoman who initially dressed herself up as a young man due to her low self esteem in an attempt at being taken serious by her male peers. But after being humiliated by Ban, she accepts Hendrickson's proposal of becoming a New Generation Holy Knight and thereafter embraces her femininity while resolving to make Ban suffer.^{[ch. 30, 42]} But Jericho begins to develop feelings for Ban after he saves her from being consumed by the demon blood in her body and begins following him; unwelcome in the new Fairy King's Forest, she later witnesses Ban's reunion with his father, Zhivago. When a revived Elaine attempts to kill her, she snaps the fairy of her jealous rage by expressing her love for Ban as unrequited. Jericho then refuses to abandon Ban and Elaine after they are trounced in battle by two of the Ten Commandments, carrying them off in an attempt to save them before stumbling upon Escanor's bar.

After the death of her brother, Gustaf, Jericho discovers that she possesses ice magic, just like he did, and decides to carry out her brother's will. After the war, she stayed a Holy Knight serving in Liones. After the first major time skip of a year and a half, while training with Howzer and Guila, she ran off to the Fairy King's Forest after a fairy informs her of Lancelot's birth. In Four Knights of the Apocalypse, having fallen in love with her apprentice Lancelot despite their familial ties and age disparity, Jericho defected to Camelot after Arthur promised to grant her desire of a world where Lancelot loves her.

Howzer
Voiced by: Ryohei Kimura (Japanese); Ray Chase (English)

Howzer (ハウザー, Hauzā) is a Holy Knight with the rank of Platinum and dominion over magic that allows him to generate and manipulate wind. He is also a childhood friend of Gilthunder's. Despite being hot-blooded and self-confident, he also believes in the honor of the Holy Knights and looks up to Dreyfus. He fights at the Vaizel annual fighting festival and is defeated by Diane. After realizing the identity of the Seven Deadly Sins and witnessing Diane saving an innocent civilian, he begins to wonder whether they are really as bad everyone says they are. After witnessing many cruelties on the part of his fellow Knights and seeing Diane protecting Guila's brother, he sides with the Sins and protects Diane from Dreyfus, despite being grossly outmatched. Later, it is hinted that he harbors romantic feelings towards Diane. After Fraudrin's defeat, he is surprisingly named Great Holy Knight by King Bartra in Gilthunder's absence. Despite his initial doubts, he accepts. In Four Knights of the Apocalypse, Howzer encounters his nephew Donny and Percival's group and reluctantly entrusts the Dragon Handle to Percival after forging it into a true sword.

Griamore
Voiced by: Takahiro Sakurai, Yuko Hara (young) (Japanese); Patrick Seitz, Dorothy Elias-Fahn (young) (English)

Griamore (グリアモール, Guriamōru) is a Holy Knight and Dreyfus's son who was assigned to be Veronica's bodyguard at a young age. He possesses the ability to create spherical barriers that are effective against most attacks. Griamore is very devoted to Veronica to the point of opposing the Holy Knights of Henderickson's faction when they threatened to harm her if he refused to hand Elizabeth over to them. After taking a seemingly dead Veronica to Pernes for a proper burial at Elizabeth's request, Griamore was reported dead before returning at the last minute to aid in Hendrickson's defeat. He accompanies his cousin Gilthunder and Howzer in their search for answers regarding his father's research, only to gain Hendrickson as an ally when they face a Gray Demon.

Griamore is later cursed to revert into his childhood self by the ability of a monster that he and Slader fight during their training in Istal, ultimately playing a role in Fraudin's defeat as the demon grew to care about him. Griamore eventually returned to his true self when Veronica, whom he is in love with, broke the spell by kissing him. It's later revealed that they were trying terribly to hide their relationship from everyone.

Helbram
Voiced by: Hiroshi Kamiya, Ryōtarō Okiayu (as Aldrich) (Japanese); Kyle McCarley, Richard Epcar (as Aldrich) (English)

Helbram (ヘルブラム, Heruburamu) is a Cardinal-ranked Holy Knight and Hendrickson's second-in-command. He is a ruthlessly cruel and sadistic elderly man with an eyepatch over his left eye and the ability to disguise himself as an imp named Love Helm (ラブヘルム, Rabu Herumu).^{[ch. 44]} He uses a skill called Link (同調(リンク), Rinku) that allows him to use the powers of anyone who consents to it.^{[ch. 48]} Helbram is eventually revealed to be a fairy and King's former best friend. He was originally interested in humans until he and fellow fairies were kidnapped by a human named Aldrich, who killed his friends by ripping their wings off in order to sell them. Traumatized by watching his friends die, Helbram lost his sanity thinking Aldrich had killed King and kills the human. He then assumed Aldrich's physical form to maintain his immense misanthropy as he went on a murder spree, killing humans for 500 years, until King killed him, honoring an old promise to stop his former friend in the event that such a fate should befall him.^{[vol. 10]}

But fairies' corpses never decompose and Helbram's body ended up in the possession of Henderickson, who reanimated him using a forbidden spell and had him serve as his second-in-command.^{[ch. 86]} After King kills Helbram again in the present-day, he reveals that the helmet of his Love Helm disguise was meant as a gift for King. Helbram is then reanimated by Henderickson a second time as a semi-mindless shell, retaining enough of his consciousness to ask King to completely destroy his body.^{[ch. 86, 90]} His spirit stays bound to the helmet, which King takes, until it is eventually destroyed when Helbram sacrifices it to Diane while she is possessed by the spirits of a village that he destroyed ages ago, allowing him to pass on.^{[ch. 105, 228]} King salvages the helmet's remains to use them as a decoration in his new outfit. Helbram came in ninth place in a 2014 character popularity poll for the series.

Vivian
Voiced by: Minako Kotobuki (Japanese); Marieve Herington (English)

Vivian (ビビアン, Bibian) is an enigmatic Holy Knight mage who serves under Hendrickson and was previously Merlin's apprentice. She now expresses a disdain for Merlin, as well as pigs. Vivian is also obsessed with Gilthunder, subjecting him and Margaret to her familiars to keep them apart and under Hendrickson's control. Following Hendrickson's defeat, Vivian is exiled from Liones and outfitted by Merlin with a cursed non-detachable ring that would kill her if she were to try and use her magic on Gilthunder. Merlin also gave Gilthunder a secret word that would allow Vivian to become completely subservient to him. Vivian later assumed the disguise of a male mage named Gilfrost to infiltrate Liones as an ally until the Ten Commandants conquered the city, when she spirits Gilthunder away to a tower high above the skies so she could keep him forever. However, she is mortally wounded by Ludoshel after Margaret allowed the archangel to possess her so she could save Gilthunder. But Vivian is saved from death by Henderickson at the behest of Dreyfus, whom she turned her affections towards following her recovery and being freed of Merlin's curse. But as revealed in Four Knights of the Apocalypse, she did not fully got over her obsession with Gilthunder and ended up kidnapping his toddler son, Chion. Vivian spent her time putting curses on the people she considered wronged her and teaching magic to Chion. Vivian is nearly killed by Chion when he escapes.

Zaratras
Voiced by: Rikiya Koyama (Japanese); Lex Lang (English)

Ten years before the start of the series, Zaratras (ザラトラス, Zaratorasu) was the strongest Holy Knight and captain of all other knights in Liones. He was a Druid and could perform Purge, a technique that expels unnatural souls.^{[ch. 123]} He was Gilthunder's father, Dreyfus' half-brother, and Griamore's uncle. Zaratras was assassinated by Dreyfus and Hendrickson when they were possessed by the demon Fraudrin, with the Seven Deadly Sins being framed for the murder.^{[ch. 124]} He is temporarily revived after the Ten Commandments take over Britannia, furious with himself for not realizing that Dreyfus and Hendrickson were being manipulated. Despite his power and rank, Zaratras is rather quirky. He stumbles upon the Boar Hat and shows Elizabeth and Hawk memories of how he and King Bartra first met Meliodas. Zaratras uses his remaining power to exorcise Fraudrin from Dreyfus' body, telling his brother and Hendrickson to stop blaming themselves for his death as he returns to the afterlife.

Gustaf
Voiced by: Makoto Furukawa (Japanese); Chris Hackney (English)

Gustaf (グスタフ, Gusutafu) is Jericho's older brother, who works for Helbram and is able to use magic that allows him to control ice. He and Jericho have not been on good terms since the time he told her she could never become a knight like him, but the reason for this turns out to be his concern about her. When Jericho turns into a demon, Gustaf begs Ban to save his sister. He later participates in defending Liones from the Ten Commandments, where he is fatally stabbed by one of the Holy Knights under Zeldris' control. He uses his remaining strength to prevent his sister and Zeal from being turned into demons by Grayroad.

Pelio
Voiced by: Sayuri Yahagi (child), Kazumasa Fukagawa (adult) (Japanese); Julie Ann Taylor (child), Henry Mason (adult) (English)

Pelio (ペリオ, Perio) is the son of the mayor of Ordan Village.^{[ch. 53]} He and his friends enjoy role-playing as the Seven Deadly Sins, with Pelio calling himself "Peliodas". Pelio's adult servant Armand, whom the boy saved after he collapsed injured outside Ordan, is forced to play the role of the Goat Sin of Lust.^{[ch. 52, 53]} When Pelio gets between the Armor Giant and the Roars of Dawn, Armand saves him and reveals himself to be the real Goat Sin, Gowther. When Gowther departs to rejoin the Deadly Sins, Pelio tearfully proclaims he will become a Holy Knight and arrest him.^{[ch. 59]} In Four Knights of the Apocalypse, Pelio, now an adult, is the head of the Guard of Liones West Gate. He holds the title of Ruby Holy Knight. His magic Perverseness makes anyone whom he damages do the opposite of their intended actions.

=== Weird Fangs ===
The Weird Fangs (不気味な牙(ウィアード・ファング), Wiādo Fangu) are Holy Knights in charge of Baste Prison (バステ監獄, Basute Kangoku), who aided in the capture of Ban whom they kept prisoner there. Following the destruction of the prison, the surviving Weird Fangs leave Liones before later returning, only to learn of the chaos that occurred in their absence.

Freesia
Voiced by: Megumi Han (Japanese); Melissa Fahn (English)

Freesia (フリージア, Furījia) is a Holy Knight with the ability to manipulate insects, uncaring towards whom she hurts in the process as long as she kills the enemy. Freesia teams up with Ruin to defeat the Seven Deadly Sins, but when Ruin's plan fails, Freesia is defeated by Diane. After a long absence, she and Ruin are revealed to have gone into hiding, only to be found by inhabitants of a village who serve the Demons and procure souls for them in exchange for their lives being spared. After witnessing Fraudrin consume Ruin's soul, she's pinned down by the villagers, with her soul eaten as well.

Golgius
Voiced by: Chō (Japanese); Dave Mallow (English)

Golgius (ゴルギウス, Gorugiusu) is a Holy Knight with the ability to turn himself invisible. Golgius tends to be a coward that uses underhand tricks to win his fights or to escape. He forces Dr. Dana to poison Meliodas while he is healing him. Golgius is later defeated by Meliodas and runs away. After returning to Liones to find the kingdom's countryside overrun with demons, an injured Golgius escapes and stumbles upon the Boar Hat. After being nursed back to health, Hawk recognizes his scent, but Elizabeth admits that she holds no grudge towards him and lets him off. In Four Knights of the Apocalypse, Golgius is revealed to resume his service in Liones and become the father of Thetis.

Ruin
Voiced by: Atsushi Ono (Japanese); Marc Diraison (English)

Ruin (ルイン) is the Leader of Weird Fangs, who possesses illusionary and hypnotic abilities, the source of which is a little bell mounted at the top of his staff, as well as the ability to harden his body. Of all the Weird Fangs, Ruin is shown to be the cruellest as he beats an unarmed Elizabeth and appears to enjoy it. Apparently killed, Ruin and Freesia go into hiding, only for Fraudrin to later consume his soul before he is able to react.

Jude
Voiced by: Nobuyuki Hiyama (Japanese); Jalen K. Cassell (English)

Jude (ジュド, Judo) is a Holy Knight and one of the four Weird Fangs of Baste Dungeon who aided in the capture of the Deadly Sin, Ban. He tortured Ban mercilessly while keeping him imprisoned. Jude is believed to have been killed by Ban when he escaped.

=== Roars of Dawn ===
The Roars of Dawn (暁闇の咆哮(ドーン・ロアー), Dōn Roā; lit. 'Dawn Roar') are a group of independent Holy Knights formed by King Liones to replace the Seven Deadly Sins after they were branded traitors.^{[ch. 69]} The Roars of Dawn are known for their tenacity to see their missions through to the very end. They first encounter the Seven Deadly Sins when tasked with killing the Armor Giant and bringing his head to Helbram, with Gowther ending the conflict peacefully. The group later dwindles to two members after the other three are killed by Fraudin while escorting Dreyfus to prison.

Slader
Voiced by: Shinichiro Miki (Japanese); Doug Erholtz (English)

Slader (スレイダー, Sureidā) is the tall, long-haired leader of the Roars of Dawn who wears an iron mask and wields a saw-toothed sword. He is fully loyal to King Liones for rescuing him from savages as a youth.^{[ch. 69]} He also expresses an admiration towards Merlin for freeing the king.^{[ch. 114]} His ability is Overpower (威圧(オーバーパワー), Ōbāpawā), which allows him to momentarily freeze an enemy in place through sheer intimidation. Slader later accompanies the Seven Deadly Sins in their mission against the Ten Commandments as the caretaker of an unstable Gowther.

Simon
Voiced by: Ryōsuke Kanemoto (Japanese); Lucien Dodge (English)

Simon (サイモン, Saimon) is seemingly the youngest member of the Roars of Dawn. Simon is a young long-haired boy who wields a long katana-like blade and wears samurai-esque armor.

Wine Height
Voiced by: Hideki Nakanishi (Japanese); Kyle Hebert (English)

Wine Height (ワインハイト, Wainhaito) is the Roars of Dawn's archer, able to engulf his arrows in energy and create an illusionary double of himself as a decoy.^{[ch. 54]} He was killed by a possessed Dreyfus, alongside Jillian and Hugo.

Jillian
Voiced by: Erika Sawai (Japanese); Dorothy Elias-Fahn (English)

Jillian (ジリアン, Jirian) is the only female member of the Roars of Dawn. She wields a sword and can ensnare her enemies with magical binding. She is killed by a possessed Dreyfus, alongside Wine Height and Hugo.

Hugo
Voiced by: Hiroki Yamada (Japanese); Patrick Seitz (English)

Hugo (ヒューゴ, Hyūgo) is the largest member of the Roars of Dawn. Hugo is covered from head to toe in armor and wields two weapons similar in appearance to saw-blades on a stick. He is killed by a possessed Dreyfus, alongside Wine Height and Jillian.

=== Pleiades of the Blue Sky ===
The Pleiades of the Blue Sky (蒼天の六連星, Sōten no Rokurensei) are a group of Holy Knights led by Denzel Liones, the Assistant Chief Holy Knight.

Denzel Liones
Voiced by: Rintarō Nishi, Satomi Kobashi (young) (Japanese); Michael McConnohie, Cristina Valenzuela (young) (English)

Denzel Liones (デンゼル・リオネス, Denzeru Rionesu) is the leader of the Pleiades of the Blue Sky and is the younger brother of King Bartra Liones. Denzel Liones possesses the ability Judgement (審判(ジャッジメント), Jajjimento), which uses the opponent's guilt to conjure up the souls of the people they killed to haunt and "judge" them. In a desperate attempt to fight the Ten Commandments, he lets the Goddess Nerobasta possess his body, but tragically, the Goddess is unwilling to help him and both are killed by a furious Derieri.

Deathpierce
Voiced by: Yōhei Azakami (Japanese); Ben Lepley (English)

Deathpierce (デスピアス, Desupiasu) is the Second-in-Command of the Pleiades of the Blue Sky who originated from Edinburgh. His ability is Melody (旋律(メロディ), Merodi); it allows him to control the rhythm and flow of magic similarly to a song, allowing him to delay magical attacks by a considerable amount of time, thereby rendering any offensive magic used against him ineffective. Spurred by the circumstances of Denzel's death and the Archangels' manipulative nature, unable to serve Liones after Meliodas and Elizabeth become its rulers, Deathpierce renounces his title of Holy Knight after the Demon King's defeat and resolves to rebuild Edinburgh as a human-only kingdom under his rule.^{[vol. 41]} Deathpierce eventually becomes the main antagonist of The Seven Deadly Sins: Grudge of Edinburgh, ending up in solitude after his war declaration on the non-human races forced his subjects to leave Edinburgh. Deathpierce acquired a Chaos Staff from Arthur that he uses to realize their shared vision by creating an army of Empties from suits of armor and enforcers from fusing some of his prisoners. But Deathpierce is eventually transformed into a monster before being defeated by Tristan and Lancelot.

Arden
Voiced by: Toshiyuki Toyonaga (Japanese); Billy Kametz (English)

Arden (アーデン, Āden) is the youngest member of the Pleiades. His ability is In Vain (無駄(ベイン), Bein), which he applies to weapons that sap the magic of the people they strike.^{[ch. 138]} The effect can be applied multiple times, preventing powers which require a significant amount of magic from activating.

Deldry
Voiced by: Emiri Katō (Japanese); Kayli Mills (English)

Deldry (デルドレー, Derudorē) is the only female member of the Pleiades. She carries a heart-shaped staff. Her ability is Love Drive (衝動(ラブドライブ), Rabu Doraibu), which is capable of arousing intense feelings and of love and loyalty towards her in those who fall for her charms.^{[ch. 138]} She often bickers with Arden.

Dogedo
Voiced by: Hiromichi Tezuka

Dogedo (ドゲッド, Dogeddo) is a cocky and seemingly arrogant Platinum Holy Knight. He challenges Meliodas to a fight since he did not believed in his strength. After being easily defeated, Deathpierce mentioned that he lost a friend in the battle against Hendrickson. When he recklessly kills a servant turned demon in the presence of Grayroad, the curse of the Commandment drains his life and kills him.

Waillo
Voiced by: Ryunosuke Watanuki (Japanese); Kirk Thornton (English)

Waillo (ワイーヨ, Waīyo) is a Platinum-ranked Holy Knight and member of the Pleiades of the Blue Sky. Waillo is also the brother of the late apprentice Holy Knight Twigo. He is greatly infatuated with Deldry,^{[ch. 138]} but whether this is genuine affection or an effect of her Love Drive is unknown.

== Camelot ==
The Kingdom of Camelot (キャメロット, Kyamerotto) is the newly established kingdom in the southern regions of Britannia, ruled by Arthur Pendragon with Merlin as his advisor. Though Camelot was taken over by Zeldris and later destroyed during the battle between the Seven Deadly Sins and the Demon King, Arthur uses his gained powers as the Chaos King to rebuild Camelot as an "everlasting kingdom". Camelot serves as an antagonistic force in the sequel series Four Knights of the Apocalypse, due to the titular group foretold to kill Arthur while his subordinates seek to use the Coffin of Eternal Darkness. Some of its members and affiliates use the Chaos Staves (混沌の杖, Konton no Tsue), which allow them to harness Chaos magic.

=== Arthur Pendragon ===
Voiced by: Sachi Kokuryu (Japanese); Zach Aguilar (English)

Arthur Pendragon (アーサー・ペンドラゴン, Āsā Pendoragon) is the 16-year-old king of Camelot, that while naive is kind and noble. He is being mentored by Merlin and possesses a great power that even allowed him to fight Hendrickson, but even he is not really sure what this power consists in. He later joins the Seven Deadly Sins in their mission against the Ten Commandments, acquiring his familiar Cath in the process. Having admired Meliodas all his life, Arthur becomes disillusioned upon learning he sided with the demons. This spurs him to claim the Holy Sword Excalibur, which gives who it chooses the power and skill of its previous users from the past. Each time a person uses it, their soul moves into the blade making it stronger, and making sure that the next person had to be strong enough to wield it. As such, it showed Arthur's true potential as a "King among Kings" by being chosen by Excalibur. Though Arthur acquires Excalibur, he lacked the skills to properly use it. Cusack uses his Resonant to manipulate Arthur's body into impaling himself with Excalibur.^{[vol. 31]} After the Demon King's death, Merlin conducts a ritual to resurrect Arthur as the "King of Chaos" with the power to manipulate reality from becoming a vessel of Chaos.^{[ch. 335]} He later helps the sins by absorbing Cath Palug and although overwhelmed at first by the Chaos power, he swears to use it for the good of everyone.

Arthur supposedly becomes the main antagonist of Four Knights of the Apocalypse, replacing his arm with a prosthetic limb after Cath Palug ate it, and instigated the events of The Seven Deadly Sins: Grudge of Edinburgh through Deathpierce. Arthur then rebuilt Camelot in an unknown location, taking the survivors there with the goal of completing his utopia by purging Britannia of the non-human races. He also seeks out Guinevere as a wife to both maintain appearances as a king and to use her foresight to alter his fate. In truth however this Arthur is Cath Palug who took Arthur's powers and body thanks to Arthur absorbing him, the real Arthur being left weakened and under Merlin's care.

=== The Four Evils ===
An elite group of Knights of Chaos who are initially tasked to kill the Four Knights of the Apocalypse and or acquire Guinevere. They are also bestowed a fragment of Chaos that would take away their humanity and memories of loved ones, making them more loyal to Arthur.

Ironside

Voiced by: Toshiyuki Morikawa (Japanese); Yong Yea (English)

Ironside (イロンシッド, Ironshiddo), known as the Red Knight and Ironside the Assassin, is a Four Evils member who believes his actions are for the greater good. Having fled Camelot during the Holy War after betraying Arthur, Ironside resumed his position in Camelot's Holy Knights as Arthur possesses the power to prolong the life of his Diodra. He responsible for creating Percival, having intended him to be an immortal vessel for Diodora's soul before his father Varghese intervened and spirited the child away. Ironside strives to prevent the prophecy of the Four Knights of the Apocalypse by killing his father Varghese before learning Percival was his intended quarry. Similar to Chion, his power summons elemental spirits to aid him in battle.

Pellegarde
Voiced by: Rikiya Koyama; Arthur Romeo (English)

Pellegarde (ペルガルド, Perugarudo) is a Four Evils member with the title of Black Knight who takes interest in Percival with intent to train the boy. His magic lets him conjure fireballs that look their targets until they have been burned to ashes.

Worreldane

Worreldan (ウォーラルダン, Wōrarudan) is a Four Evils member with the title of White Knight, an acquaintance of Merlin.

Beltreipe
Voiced by: Himika Akaneya (young) (Japanese); Morgan Berry (young) (English)

Beltreipe (ベルトレープ, Berutorēpu) is a Four Evils member with the title of Green Knight who is also most physically strong of the group. He was originally Daymond (デモンド, Demondo), Escanor's resentful older brother who also survived the fall of Castellio.

=== Diodora ===
Voiced by: Lynn (Japanese); Anne Yatco (English)

Diodora (ディオドラ) is Ironside's son who was born sickly due to his mother being a casualty to the Demon King's poison during his battle with the Seven Deadly Sins, kept within the confines of Camelot. But after Ironside discarded his humanity and memories, Diodora later manifests the ability Despair, a polar opposite to Percival's Hope which also allows him to take another's magic and make it his own.

=== Knights of Chaos ===
The Knights of Chaos (混沌の騎士, Konton no Kishi) are a group of Holy Knights that serve King Arthur in the newly created kingdom of Camelot.

Nanashi

Voiced by: Daiki Hamano (Japanese); Chris Hackney (English) Nanashi (ななし) is a nameless samurai from distant lands who mentors Arthur in swordsmanship. He is later revealed to be an exiled member of the Goddess race whose wings were ripped off for refusing to participate in the Holy War. Later becoming the Chaos Knight Tomintoul (トミントール, Tomintōru), he remained loyal to Arthur despite his king's plans to wipe out all non-humans from Britannia.

Talisker
Voiced by: Setsuji Sato (Japanese); Jon Allen (English)

Talisker (タリスカー, Tarisukā) is a Holy Knight of Camelot with the title of Amber Knight who resides in Echo Gorge. He was responsible for turning Nasiens and Dolores' adoptive father Orso into a creature of Chaos, after the latters refusal to no longer give medical treatment to non-human races. His magic Calamity allows him to control the weather. He was later taken out by Percival.

Mortlach
Voiced by: Showtaro Morikubo (Japanese); Todd Haberkorn (English)

Mortlach (モートラック, Mōtorakku) is a Holy Knight of Camelot as well as Ironside's brother-in-law. His power "duelist" allows the user to lock themself and whoever agrees to a duel with them to a "Dueling Chamber", a separate dimension from which only the winner can emerge.^{[ch. 102]}.

Ardbeg
Voiced by: Wataru Takagi

Ardbeg (アードベック, Ādobeggu) is a Holy Knight of Camelot who village was destroyed by demons during the new Holy War with his daughter killed during the raid. Having vowed to purge the demons from Britannia, he was approached by Arthur and joined his cause. His magic Reverse allows him to make any living target within fifty yards to regress to their infant forms. He also commands a Chaos familiar called Cernunnos (ケルヌンノス, Kerunun'nosu), which takes the form of a dog named Kellie (ケリー, Kerī). He manages to trick Anne and Nasiens into removing the barrier that masks a village populated by peaceful demons, sealing away the demons before attempting to kill Percival by using Cernunnos. When it was defeated, Ardbeg flees into the Crystal Grotto where he incapacitates Percival's group with his magic. The Village Elder, revealed to be Gowther in disguise, arrives and reveals that he came to the Grotto in order to be reunited with his daughter. He attempted to threaten Gowther by throwing Percival and Anne off a cliff before Gowther conjured an illusion of the man's daughter to stop him, with Ardbeg realizing that Arthur may not be able to bring back his child as he remembered. Soon after deciding to leave Camelot, Ardbeg sacrifices himself to save Anne from Tamdhu's attack.

Teaninich

Teaninich (ティーニニック, Tīninikku) is a Holy Knight of Camelot. Her Summon creates magic allows her to control any small animal within her range. She is later captured by the Apocalypse group and is killed by Arthur's reversed curse, when she was attempting to flee back to Camelot.

Macduff

Macduff (マクダフ, Makudafu) is a Holy Knight of Camelot. His magic allows him to cancel out all sounds. He manages to kill Jade before being forced to flee. He was killed by Chion.

=== Dark Talismans ===
The Dark Talismans (闇のタリスマン, Yami no Tarisuman) are Holy Knights that serve as elite assassins.

Fiddich

Fiddich (フィディック, Fidikku) is the leader of the Dark Talismans whose ability Haste allows him to run at super-human speeds. After the other Talismans were defeated by Percival's group, he reveals himself and heals his knights. Fiddich soon realizes that Percival's group only overpowered his subordinates due to Sin's help and attempts to kill the fox, only to force Sin to reveal his true identity as Lancelot before effortlessly killing the other Talismans. Fiddich attempts to flee on his Chaos mount Sleipnir (スレイプニル, Sureipuniru), only to be quickly shot down and killed by Lancelot.

Elgin

Elgin (エルジン, Erujin) is a member of the Dark Talismans whose ability Wither gradually weakens his target's strength and durability when hit. He was the first of the Talismans that Percival and his group faced in the Entangled Forest with the group managing to beat him. He is killed by being shot in his vitals by Lancelot's arrows.

Doronach

Doronach (ドロナック, Doronakku) is a member of the Dark Talismans whose ability Impact creates a powerful blast of magic in a fifty-foot radius. He fights against Donny who manages to fend him off with his telekinetic powers. He is killed by Lancelot with a blow that ruptures his insides with his corpse being split in half by Fiddich to get to the youth.

Burgie

Burgie (バーギー, Bāgī) is a sole female member of the Dark Talismans who uses the magic gear Staff of the Four Elements while also possessing the ability Mirage which creates illusionary clones. She fights against Anne who manages to find the real Burgie amongst the clones and kills her. She is killed by being shot in her vitals by Lancelot's arrows.

Tamdhu

Tamdhu (タムドゥ, Tamudu) is a member of the Dark Talismans whose ability Homing allows him to coat weapons with magic that can his targets from a far distance. After being hit by Gowther's Invasion: "Jack", he begins attacking his fellow knights until being mercilessly cut down by Fiddich.

== Demon Clan ==
The Demon Clan is a race of humanoid beings who were at odds with the Goddess race 3,000 years ago until Meliodas' actions caused his people to wage war against the Goddesses and Stigma, an alliance of the Human, Giant, and Fairy races. The demons were sealed away, only to be released into Britannia through the machinations of the demon Fraudrin. The high-ranking Demons possess seven hearts, making them difficult to kill.

=== Demon King ===
Voiced by: Shōzō Iizuka (original), Tesshō Genda, Yasuyuki Kase (Meliodas's Body), Kazuhiko Inoue (Zeldris's Body) (Japanese); Jason Marnocha, Mick Lauer (Meliodas's Body), J. Michael Tatum (Zeldris's Body) (English)

The Demon King (魔神王, Majin-Ō) is the progenitor of the Demons and father of Meliodas and Zeldris, along with being the one who cursed Elizabeth with reincarnation. He was created by the entity Chaos like the Supreme Deity to maintain balance in the world, continuing that purpose after sealing their creator away.^{[ch. 337]} While physically forced to remain in Purgatory due to his power being potent enough to wipe out Britannia, he fragmented parts of his soul to bestow to the Ten Commandments while conditioning his sons so one of them can become his vessel upon absorbing all the Commandment sigils.^{[vol. 36]} During the New Holy War, the Demon King manages to possess Meliodas when he absorbed the Commandments and engages his son in the metaphysical battle while battling his comrades and mortally wounding Zeldris. Though purged from Meliodas, the Demon King's spirit possesses Zeldris's body with Cusack's help before engaging the Seven Deadly Sins in an epic battle.^{[vol. 37-39]} The Demon King is eventually exorcised from Zeldris and is forced to create a body from the surrounding countryside before being destroyed for good by Meliodas, his death breaking the seal that he and the Supreme Deity placed on Chaos.^{[vol. 40]}

=== Ten Commandments ===
The Ten Commandments (十戒, Jikkai) are a group of ten elite demons personally selected by the Demon King. They were originally led by Meliodas 3,000 years prior before he fell in love with Elizabeth, which caused the Holy War. Each of the Ten Commandments can make use of a curse which plays on the virtue that they represent, later revealed to be fragments of the Demon King's soul. A commandment's sigil passes to whoever defeats the current holder or receives it willingly, with the one who possesses all ten sigils gaining power equal to the Demon King's, yet subject to becoming his vessel.^{[vol. 36]} The Commandment sigils are eventually destroyed when Meliodas permanently destroys the Demon King.^{[ch. 332]}

Zeldris
Voiced by: Yuki Kaji (Japanese); Bryce Papenbrook (English)

Zeldris (ゼルドリス, Zerudorisu) is The Ten Commandments' acting leader and Meliodas' younger twin brother, bearing the sigil of Piety which turns those who turn their back on him into obedient servants to him and the Demon King, by extension. This ability relates to Zeldris' resentment towards Meliodas before betraying their father despite the Demon King's still wanting his older brother to become the new Demon King. Though having acquired the other sigils, Zeldris gives them to Meliodas after his brother promised to use his power as Demon King to revive the vampire Gelda whom Zeldris developed feelings for him. But Zeldris realizes the truth of the Demon King's succession as he is mortally wounded helping the Deadly Sins save Meliodas from the Demon King's possession. But Cusack unknowingly makes Zeldris his father's new body in the aftermath of the New Holy War.^{[vol. 36, 37]} Luckily, the Deadly Sins manage to free Zeldris as he and a revived Gelda take their leave after the Demon King is destroyed.^{[ch. 333]} Zeldris returns to the aid the Sins during the events of the epilogue film The Seven Deadly Sins: Cursed by Light, taking over as ruler of the Demon World while making peace with Meliodas. In Four Knights of the Apocalypse, Zeldris is revealed to have looked after Percival while he ended up in the Demon World before sending him back to his grandfather.

Fraudrin
Voiced by: Hidenobu Kiuchi, Katsuyuki Konishi (Dreyfus's Body) (Japanese); Chris Cason, Jamieson Price (Dreyfus's Body) (English)

Fraudrin (フラウドリン, Furaudorin) is an upper-class demon resembling a purple spiked giant with a mouth on his chest. He was previously a general during the ancient war before being promoted to a substitute Commandment following Gowther's disappearance, despite not receiving the Demon King's soul fragment representing Selflessness. Fraudrin is the cause of the Danafall Kingdom's destruction, having accidentally been released from the Coffin of Eternal Darkness together with other low-class demons, only to be nearly killed when Meliodas' rage vaporized the kingdom after Fraudrin murdered Liz. This forced a weakened Fraudrin to possess the body of Dreyfus when he and Hendrickson were sent to investigate the ruins, using the two humans in a scheme to get revenge on Meliodas while bringing the rest of the demons back to Britannia.^{[vol. 16]} Pretending to be Dreyfus until the Ten Commandments were freed, he developed an emotional attachment to Dreyfus' son Griamore as a result; Fraudrin rejoins the group to replenish his strength while revealing his substitute status while in the Pleiades of the Blue Sky's custody. During the Commandments' attack on Liones, Zaratras and Hendrickson eventually exorcise Fraudrin with the demon ending up fighting Meliodas. Fraudrin attempts to self-destruct and take Liones with him but stops at Griamore's pleas, realizing Meliodas' motivation for betraying their people and allowing him to end his life.^{[vol. 24]}

Estarossa
Voiced by: Hiroki Tōchi, Shinei Ueki (young) (Japanese); David Vincent, David Errigo Jr. (young) (English)

Estarossa (エスタロッサ, Esatarossa) is the normally laid-back adopted older brother of Zeldris and Meliodas. He possesses a version of the latter's Full Counter ability that allows him to reflect physical attacks. Estarossa is later revealed to be originally the Archangel Mael (マエル, Maeru) of the Goddess race who possessed the Grace Sunshine (太陽, Taiyō) which increases his power while exposed to sunlight. Being among those who slaughtered unarmed demons at the start of the Holy War, Mael's identity was rewritten by the Commandant Gowther to have him take Meliodas' place in the Ten Commandants as the holder of the Demon King's soul fragment representing Love (慈愛/恋仲/慈しみ/恋心/想い/思い/愛着/愛好/恋愛/愛情/恋/好き/愛/慈愛, Jiai /Koinaka/Itsukushimi/Koigokoro/Omoi/Omoi/Aichaku/Aikō/Ren'ai/Aijō/Koi/Suki/Ai/Jiai), enabling him to nullify any damage by those with hatred in their hearts. But traces of Estarossa's former identity linger as retain his love for Elizabeth and his deep-seated grudge toward Meliodas for stealing her heart, which strengthened his false memories. Being easily defeated by a fully powered Escanor during the siege of Liones since his opponent did not harbour any hatred towards him, Estarossa learns of Zeldris's alliance with Meliodas to make the latter the new Demon King and acts against them by taking Galland and Monspeet's Commandments. The result causes Estarossa's mind and body to become unstable while returning to his true identity as Mael, deciding to make Gowther suffer for his role in his creator's spell by killing his friends and absorb Derieri's Commandment while killing her, Oslo, Tariel, and Sariel in the resulting battle. After being defeated by King and Gowther managing to help him expel the commandments, Mael uses a spell to enable Oslo and Derieri to reincarnate with their memories intact.^{[vol. 33, 34]} Mael then joins the Deadly Sins to end the new Holy War and stop the Demon King to atone for his role in the previous Holy War, regaining Sunshine from Escanor before bestowing it back to the human during the Sins' final battle with the Demon King.^{[vol. 36, 39]} Mael returns during the events of the epilogue film The Seven Deadly Sins: Cursed by Light when his revived kingsmen attack Liones on the Supreme Deity's command, attempting to stop them.

Melascula
Voiced by: Mao Ichimichi (Japanese); Mela Lee (English)

Melascula (メラスキュラ, Merasukyura) is a snake who became a pink-haired naja demon from bathing in miasma for years, possessing a composed yet mocking personality. She possesses the Commandment of Faith, which burns the eyes of anyone who loses faith or doubts their convictions in her presence. She uses her aura to summon the souls of the dead in order to create a zombie army to wipe out humans and can summon lesser demons as well. When the reanimated Elaine resists her control, she and Galland pursue her, Ban, and Jericho to Escanor's bar. After getting inebriated by the owner's beer, Melascula witnesses Galland's defeat against Escanor and ends up horrifically burned in her attempt to swallow the human's soul. Though healed by Gloxinia while joining the other Ten Commandments into overpowering Meliodas, Melascula gets her jaw dislocated by Ban with most of her hearts destroyed. She is later sent to Coland to maintain a barrier around Camelot, trapping Meliodas in a Dark Cocoon while using Coland's restless dead against the other Sins and Elaine. But she is ultimately defeated and purified back into a normal snake by Elizabeth, with Merlin trapping the powerless Melascula in a test tube to study her prior to losing her Commandment.

In Four Knights of the Apocalypse, Melascula regains her humanoid form after being infused with the power of chaos by King Arthur to serve him as Chaos Melascula (カオス = メラスキュラ, Kaosu Merasukyura). She infiltrates Liones with Galland's severed head before reviving him to enact both Arthur's orders for the Four Knights to be killed along with her revenge on the Deadly Sins. After being defeated by Tristan, Melascula is forced to use her Chaos Staff to fuse herself with Galland to become Melagalland (メラガラン, Meragarando) in a final attempt for the demons to fulfill their mission.

Galland
Voiced by: Hiroshi Iwasaki (Japanese); Kirk Thornton (English)

Galland (ガラン, Garan) is a gangly and arrogant demon clad in a armor and armed with a halberd. He possesses the fragment of the Demon King's soul representing Truth (真実, Shinjitsu) which petrifies whomsoever lies in his presence, including himself should he break a promise.^{[ch. 121]} After being revived, though not back at full power yet, Galland decides to attack Camelot as a warm-up upon learning Meliodas is there. Subjecting Merlin to his Commandment's power when she attempts to stall for time after he killed most of Camelot's knights, Galland takes his leave after Gowther manipulates him into thinking that he killed the Deadly Sins and Slader.^{[vol. 15, 16]} After being easily overpowered by Meliodas after he regains his full powers, Galland accompanies Melascula to Raven, where they begin to hunt Ban, Jericho, and Elaine.^{[vol. 18]} The search takes the demons to My Sweet Gluttony, with Galland showing his love for alcohol and challenging Escanor to a "game" in which the two would take turns hitting each other with their weapons until one would end up dead. Despite being split in half by the Sin of Pride, he regenerates and uses his most powerful ability "Critical Over" to try and finish off Escanor, only to see that his attack barely managed to scratch him. Galland ignores Melascula's warnings out of pride before attempting to flee as Escanor was about to finish him and is petrified as a result.^{[vol. 19]} Galland remained conscious and is later found by Estarossa, who shatters him in order to acquire his Commandment.

In Four Knights of the Apocalypse, Galland's head was retrieved by King Arthur and given to Melascula for her to revive with the power of chaos. He is brought back as an armorless and muscular version of himself called Chaos Galland (カオス = ガラン, Kaosu Garan) to carry out Arthur's orders to kill the Four Knights of the Apocalyse while acting on his own desire to enact revenge on the Deadly Sins. After Galland is defeated by Gawain and Percival, his body is fused with Melascula's to form Melagalland in the demons' last ditch effort to fulfill their mission.

Monspeet
Voiced by: Kenjiro Tsuda (Japanese); Keith Silverstein (English)

Monspeet (モンスピート, Monsupīto) is a sophisticated, human-looking demon with a thin moustache and purple hair, able to utilize long-range flame magic in the form of birds. He's a gentleman of sorts and is usually close to Derieri. He possesses the Commandment of Reticence, which prevents him from verbally expressing his true feelings of love towards Derieri with her unaware of it. He and Derieri went into hiding after being defeated by Meliodas, taking refuge in a small cabin near a village with the resolve to no longer partake in the fighting. But the two are attacked by Estarossa with Monspeet sacrificing himself so Derieri can escape.

Derieri
Voiced by: Ayahi Takagaki (Japanese); Allegra Clark (English)

Derieri (デリエリ) is a female demon with spiky, unruly hair who is naked save for a few patches of darkness covering parts of her body. She has a crude, yet carefree personality and often prefaces her comments with "the bottom line is" which Monspeet often expands on in a long-winded fashion. She possesses the Commandment of Purity, which inflicts those who commit impure deeds with disease. She is a formidable physical combatant, gaining additional power the longer she launches consecutive blows at an enemy. She expresses a deep-seated hatred towards the Goddess clan for one of them killing her older sister among several noncombatant demons that they held hostage. As a result, she and Monspeet each gave up six of their seven hearts to temporary become Induras, increasing their power at the cost of being easily killed by an opponent. She and Monspeet are later beaten by Meliodas, shortly after he re-awakened and are seen later relaxing in a small cabin, hiding their identities as Demons. Having lost her will to fight, Derieri decides to go to Camelot and return her Commandment to Zeldris, but Estarossa finds them first. Monspeet manages to save her from being killed by launching her away from Estarossa, conveniently sending her to where the assault team composed of Holy Knights, the Four Archangels, and the Seven Deadly Sins are fending off a demon attack. When Estarossa spirits Elizabeth away, Derieri offers her help to King, Sariel, and Tauriel in retrieving her. She comes up with a plan to hold Estarossa once he is revealed as Mael from the Goddess clan by working as a team with Gowther, King, and the rest. However, she dies after Mael blows out her last heart in the battle, which results in her commandment being absorbed as well. In the afterlife, she is thankful to Elizabeth as she finally learns about Monspeet's feelings for her. After Mael is saved from the commandments, he uses a spell to allow Oslo's and Derieri's souls keep their memories of their previous lives in their next reincarnation. The events of Four Knights of the Apocalypse reveal that Derieri reincarnated as a human mage named Thetis (ティティス, Titisu), serving in Liones under Elizabeth.

Drole
Voiced by: Daisuke Ono (Japanese); Mark Whitten (English)

Drole (ドロール, Dorōru) is the founding king of the Giant race also known to the humans as Balor, revered by his people for developing a sacred dance and valor in battle despite being shunned as a child for his four arms, grayish-blue skin, and his gouged-out left eye. While he initially participated in the Holy War as a member of Stigmata, Drole joined the demons alongside Gloxinia after submitting to Zeldris and joining the Ten Commandments. He replaces a member Meliodas killed as the holder of the Commandment of Patience, which inflicts those intolerant of pain with further pain. Drole later takes an interest in Diana when he and Gloxinia turn Vaizel into a gigantic labyrinth in order to gather fighters and attract the Seven Deadly Sins, later testing King and Diane by having them enact their roles in the Holy War to see if they made the right choice. Diane selecting the opinion to run away rather than submit or die fighting convinces Drole to leave the Ten Commandments alongside Gloxinia. He is killed by Chandler while he and Gloxinia try to protect the Seven Deadly Sins.

Gloxinia
Voiced by: Yūsuke Kobayashi (Japanese); Marin Miller (English)

Gloxinia (グロキシニア, Gurokishinia) is the first Fairy King and member of Stigma, who was assumed to have been killed by the Demon King during the Ancient War. In reality, Gloxinia allied himself with the demons after believing his unconscious sister Gerharde was killed by a human ally named Rou, whom he killed after some Stigma members attacked his homeland. Gloxinia replaces a previous Commandment Meliodas killed as holder of the fragment of the Demon King's soul representing Repose, which seals away the magic of those who fight without rest. He wields the Spirit Spear Basquias, which constantly covers him in the form of tentacles and has a versatile set of abilities similar to those of King's Chastiefol, but at a much higher level of potency and destructiveness. He and Drole take an interest in King and Diane, testing them by having them enact their role in the Holy War to see if they made the right choice. King's choice to spare Rou rather than give into rage convinces Gloxinia to leave the Ten Commandments alongside Drole, sending their Commandments back to Zeldris. He and Drole are killed by Chandler when they try to protect the fleeing Seven Deadly Sins.

Grayroad
Voiced by: Kōji Yusa (Japanese); Ben Lepley (English)

Grayroad (グレイロード, Gureirōdo) is a queen-caste mutated Gray Demon composed of multiple dwarf-sized masks shrouded in miasma-like flames, able to shape-shift into any form and turn humans into low-level demons.^{[vol. 24]} She possesses the fragment of the Demon King's soul representing Pacifism, causing anyone who kills in her presence to forfeit their remaining years and immediately age to death. She also commands powerful cursing magic that automatically returns her target to the location at which she cursed them, preventing them from escaping her. Grayroad ends up becoming one of Merlin's test subjects when the witch proves herself to be immune to Grayroad's commandment and is captured in a test tube after attempting to flee.

Gowther of Selflessness
Voiced by: Keiji Fujiwara (Wrath of the Gods), Yōhei Tadano (Dragon's Judgement) (Japanese); Greg Chun (English)

Gowther (ゴウセル, Gōseru) is a Demon sorcerer and Merlin's mentor who was forced to bear the Demon King's soul fragment representing Selflessness and subsequently imprisoned for five centuries when he refused to fight for the Demon King. Prior to his imprisonment, he created a proxy body in the likeness of his lover Glariza to observe the outside world until he used the Ancient War to orchestrate his escape with the intent of ending the conflict through a ritual to alter the identity of Archangel Mael into Estarossa, selecting him for being Glariza's killer.^{[vol. 33, 34]} But the large demand of magical energy needed for the ritual's success kills Gowther, passing his commandment and name on to his creation who joins the Seven Deadly Sins three millennia later.

=== First Demon ===
Voiced by: Toshihiko Seki (Japanese); Brook Chalmers (English)

The First Demon (原初の魔神, Gensho no Majin) is a centaur-like demon that Demon King had created as his adviser and ended up splitting into two separate beings as punishment for attempting to overthrow him during a revolt.^{[vol. 35]} The two halves of the First Demon, Chandler and Cusack, are instilled with the need to mentor the Demon King's sons Meliodas and Zeldris as the Demon King's heirs with both unaware of how the succession works. The First Demon is briefly restored during the New Holy War when Chandler and Cusack regain memories of their original self and cancel the Demon king's division curse, taking use of the double-edged effect of his ability Crisis as his restoration is slowly killing him. But he is defeated by Mael, whose attack restored the Demon King's spell and splintered him back into his two components.^{[vol. 35, 37]}

Chandler
Voiced by: Shinshuu Fuji (Japanese); John DeMita (English)

Chandler (チャンドラー, Chandorā) is an extremely powerful supreme-rank demon and is Meliodas' former mentor, titled as the "Pacifier Demon" from apparently sucking the marrow from his victims' bones. Chandler shows an obsession for Meliodas as he blames Elizabeth for his apprentice's betrayal while refusing to acknowledge anyone else as the next Demon King. He normally appears as an old man with a demon mark on the right side of his face, extremely proficient in magic and having taught Meloidas the Full Counter technique. While enraged, he becomes immensely muscular with his hair and eyes blackened and dragon-like wings sprouting from his back. In this form, Chandler is powerful to overwhelm the Deadly Sins on his own and conjure the daylight obscuring "True Night". Chandler is killed in the aftermath of the New Holy War by Cusack after the two briefly merged back into their original form.^{[vol. 35, 37]}

Cusack
Voiced by: Jouji Nakata (Japanese); Armen Taylor (English)

Cusack (キューザック, Kyūzakku) is an extremely powerful supreme-rank demon and is Zeldris' mentor, titled the "Dozing God of Death" with his power imposing enough to instill fear in Excalibur. Cusack generally appears a relatively young man with a long mustache, having a somewhat condescending demeanor as he usually fights those who interest him or provide a challenge. Much like Chandler, Cusack is obsessed with Zeldris to the point of love. In his true demon form, his hair whitens as he sprouts dragon's wings while his arms lengthen with his hands enlarged enough to hold his two swords with only one. Cusack kills off Chandler in the aftermath of the New Holy War and is later killed by the Demon King after unknowingly turning Zeldris into his vessel.^{[vol. 35, 37]}

=== Lower Class Demons ===
Red Demons

Red Demons (赤色魔神), also known as "Blood Demons", are the most-inferior class of demons. Their strength differs from one demon to the next, but they are stronger than Holy Knights. They are massive red obese-looking creatures that can breathe Purgatory Fire, which has far greater potency than normal fire. They also possess two hearts, making them difficult to kill. A red demon invaded the Fairy King's Forest twenty years before the series began, where it burned down the forest and killed Elaine before Ban slew it with it the aid of his newly acquired immortality. Its corpse was eventually found by Hendrickson, who uses its blood to create Holy Knights with the powers of demons, a process perfected in the New Generation.

Gray Demons

Gray Demons (灰色魔神), also known as "Ash Demons", have thick gray-colored carapaces that make them extremely durable, faces surrounded by pointed petal-like protrusions vaguely resembling a stylized sun or flower, and wings. Although they can not speak, they are stronger and more intelligent than Red Demons. In addition to breathing Purgatory Fire, they can utilize various darkness-based attacks, such as "Dark Snow", an attack that consists in conjuring up black snow-like particles which kill instantly. After being cornered and nearly defeated by five of the Sins, Hendrickson consumes the blood of a Gray Demon to vastly increase his strength and continue the battle.

Blue Demons

Blue Demons (青色魔神), also known as "Cobalt Demons", are Bird-like demons with muscular physiques, they are known for their speed. Four of them were summoned by Melascula's powers, and then they are eventually all killed off.

Albions

Giant Albions (巨獣アルビオン) are colossus-sized, demon-made golems that served as war machines during the Holy War. Rendered dormant when the Demons were sealed, they reactivate when the Ten Commandments are released.^{[ch. 115]} With power levels fixed at 5,500, they are effectively as strong as Hendrickson after he acquires the powers of the Gray Demon. Like the lower-class Demons, they can breathe Purgatory Fire. They can also sprout additional appendages from their heads to launch additional attacks. Their only weakness is a core embedded in their chest.^{[ch. 115]} Their methods of attack vary slightly depending on their shape; fat ones specialize in destructive attacks, while thinner ones prefer slashing attacks. A fat Albion attacks Camelot before being destroyed by Meliodas, and a taller, thinner one appears at the Fairy King's Forest before being destroyed by King.

=== Vampires ===
The Vampire (吸血鬼, Kyūketsuki) race are among the creatures birthed from the Mother of Chaos, serving the Demon race as vassals during the Holy War. But the Vampire King Izraf attempted a coup that ends in failure, with the Demon King using this as an excuse to force Zeldris into killing his love Gelda (ゲルダ) (Voiced by: Yuko Kaida (Japanese); Amber Lee Connors (English)). But Zeldris instead sealed the vampires away in a sarcophagus rather than execute them. But the vampires were freed 12 years prior to the inception of the story, taking over the Kingdom of Edinburgh before they were all killed with the exception of Orlandi, whom Merlin captured and turned into a bat creature in service to Camelot, and Gelda, whom Meliodas resealed before being freed and reunited with Zeldris.

== Goddess Race ==
The Goddess Race (女神族, Megami-zoku) are one of the five races of Britannia that are Demon race's equals and are led by the Supreme Deity. Three millennia ago, as a result of Elizabeth falling in love with Meliodas, the Goddess race declared war on the Demon with support from the humans, the giants, and the fairies. Though they won the war by using the Coffin of Eternal Darkness after the demon mage Gowther altered their memories that Mael was killed, the Supreme Deity was sealed away while the other members of the Goddess race lost their physical forms. Following the return of the Demons, members of the Goddess race begin to resurface and gather for a new Holy War.

=== Supreme Deity ===
Voiced by: Kana Kurashina (Japanese); Rebeka Thomas (English)

The Supreme Deity (最高神, Saikō-shin) is the progenitor of the Goddess race and Elizabeth's mother in her first life, created by Chaos along with the Demon King and the Sacred Tree for the purpose of maintaining balance through her conflict with the former. The Supreme Deity took offense to Chaos creating the Human race as she and the Demon King formed an alliance to seal away their creator, encouraging their races into conflict over dominion over the world.^{[ch. 337]} Despite her rivalry with the Demon King, the Supreme Deity joined him in destroying Bérialin for Merlin making fools of them and later cursing their children near the end of the Holy War. But Merlin and Gowther of Selflessness arranged events that sealed the Supreme Deity when she uses the Coffin of Eternal Darkness to imprison the demons. She serves as the antagonist in the epilogue film The Seven Deadly Sins: Cursed by Light, freed from her seal months after the Demon King's demise with the intent to kill the Sins and their allies before renewing the Holy War. But she ends up destroyed by Meliodas and Zeldris.

=== Ludoshel ===
Voiced by: Akira Ishida (Japanese); Jordan Reynolds (English)

Ludoshel (リュドシェル, Ryudosheru) is one of the Four Archangels of the Goddess race who possesses the Grace Flash (瞬刻/石火/ぴかぴか/ぎらぎら/きらきら/煌めき/火花/一閃/閃き/瞬時/瞬間/閃光/フラッシュ, Shunkoku/Sekka/Pikapika/Giragira/Kirakira/Kirameki/Hibana/Issen/Hirameki/Shunji/Shunkan/Senkō/Furasshu), allowing him to move at speeds that make him appear to be teleporting. While polite with a desire for peace, Ludoshel hates demons enough he lied to Meliodas of wanting peace between their peoples and willfully using Elizabeth as a distraction so he and his younger brother Mael can slaughter the unarmed demons they took hostage. Like his kin, he was made to believe Mael was killed by Estarossa. In the present day, Ludoshel was sealed within an altar before he possesses the body of Margaret Liones by promising to help her rescue Gilthunder. He then proceeds to gather new Stigma members for the new Holy War. He eventually leads Merlin, Escanor, Hendrickson and Gilthunder in order to stop Meliodas becoming the new demon king. He even states that he can not allow Meliodas to live after their victory. He fights Zeldris and defeat him as he teams with Escanor. But once remembering Mael and Estrarossa are the same person, Ludoshel ends being purged from Margaret's body when Hendrickson took advantage of the Archangel's moment of weakness. Though Hendrickson offer his body for Ludoshel, he heals the human instead and continues fighting in his partially restored physical form against the First Demon before reuniting with Mael as sacrifices himself and Deadly Sins fight the Demon King's attack and fades away soon after the battle ends.

=== Tarmiel ===
Voiced by: Satoshi Tsuruoka (Japanese); Bill Millsap (English)

Tarmiel (タルミエル, Tarumieru) is a three-headed member of the Four Archangels who possesses the Grace Ocean (海/遠海/沖/遠洋/海原/大海/海洋/大海/オーシャン, Umi/Enkai/Oki/En'yō/Unabara/Ōumi/Kaiyō/Ōumi/Ōshan), allowing him to conjure ocean to snare his opponents or liquefy his body. Three millennia after the ancient war, Tarmiel ended up sealed within the staff of Arbus whom he possessed after the man was killed by demons and joins Ludoshel in forming a new Stigma. Having regained enough of his original form to fight alongside Sariel against Estarossa, Tarmiel was briefly conflicted to fight him after learning he is Mael before being taken out by Mael's attack barrage.

=== Sariel ===
Voiced by: Shun Horie (Japanese); Griffin Burns (English)

Sariel (サリエル, Sarieru) is a child-like member of the Four Archangels who possesses the Grace Tornado (荒れ/颶風/竜巻/トルネード, Are/Gufū/Tatsumaki/Torunēdo), allowing him to manipulate wind. Three millennia after the ancient war, Sariel ended up sealed within the lute of a girl named Solaseed. Sariel tricks Solaseed into allowing him to use her body until he is able to reconstitute enough of his physical form, tricking her with the promise of curing her illness. Sariel then joins Ludoshel in forming a new Stigma. While he and Tarmiel battle Estarossa, latter learning him to be Mael, Sariel is forced to leave Solaseed's body after his Grace began affecting her via accelerated growth into an adult woman. Sariel is then fatally wounded by Mael and fades away in Tarmiel's arms.

=== Nerobasta ===
Voiced by: Mamiko Noto (Japanese); Julia McIlvaine (English)

Nerobasta (ネロバスタ, Nerobasuta) is a member of the Goddess race who ended up sealed within Denzel Liones' sword in the aftermath of the ancient war which she participated. Despite Denzel's sacrifice allowing her to take possession of his body, she shows no care for or empathy towards humans. When confronted by Derieri for her brutal murder of demon hostages, she shows cowardice by claiming that she just followed orders and tries to flee. This enrages the Commandment and Nerobasta begs for her life, only for the demon to kill her along with Denzel.

== Other characters ==
=== Hawk's Mother ===
Voiced by: Kayo Nakajima (Japanese); Lauren Landa, Kyle Hebert (Dragon's Judgement) (English)

Hawk's Mother (ホークママ, Hōku Mama) is a massive green pig who transports the Boar Hat on her back. When she finds a suitable location to place the bar, she burrows away underground, leaving only the bar peeking out from the surface. Unlike Hawk she is unable to speak, but surprisingly powerful and able to beat Red and Grey Demons with ease and even consume Monspeet's fiery attack without any ill effects. Hawk's Mother would later be revealed to be a shell of moss that the Demon King and the Supreme Deity used to seal Chaos within, known as the Mother of Chaos from which numerous monsters and the vampire royalty were birthed from. Once the seal was broken and Arthur became the King of Chaos, Hawk's Mother breaks apart as Chaos transferred into the human.

=== Elaine ===
Voiced by: Kotori Koiwai (Japanese); Brianna Knickerbocker (English)

Elaine (エレイン, Erein) is a princess of the Fairies (妖精族, Yōsei-zoku) and King's younger sister, as well as the Guardian Saint of the Fountain of Youth (生命の泉). Elaine held the post for 700 years after King left in search of his best friend, Helbram. She has the power to control Nature and the wind in her environment. 20 years before the series began, she met Ban when he attempted to drink from the fountain, but they ended up falling in love over seven days. Both she and Ban were mortally wounded by a red demon that destroyed the forest, but Elaine gave Ban the water of the fountain through a kiss so he could survive and create a new forest for her people.^{[vol. 4:Ban the Bandit]} After her death, Elaine's soul resides in the Necropolis (死者の都, Shisha no Miyako; lit. 'Capital of the Dead') dimension until she is revived by Melascula; consumed by her regret and unable to control her actions, she attacks Jericho as she did not look kindly upon her feelings towards and the time she was spending with Ban. But Jericho and Ban manage to help Elaine break free of her negative emotions, with her remaining among the living due to Melascula's spell. Like King, Elaine grows a pair of wings as a sign of her power growth as she helps the Sins defeat Melascula. After Ban goes to purgatory to find Meliodas' emotions, she fights along with Holy Knights as she waits for Ban; in the midst of the battle, she starts dying again, but Ban uses his new powers to fully resurrect her at the cost of his immortality. Elaine came in eighth place in a 2014 character popularity poll for the series.

=== Cath ===
Voiced by: Aoi Yūki (Japanese); Abby Trott (English)

Cath (キャス, Kyasu) is a mysterious cat-like creature that Arthur acquired as a familiar during his training in Istal, keeping him alive while in constant physical contact. But Cath is actually a spawn of Chaos named Cath Palug (キャス・パリーグ, Kyasu Parīgu), an embodiment of avarice and destruction that cannot be killed by any means. Cath desires to become the King of Chaos and only protected Arthur in order to eat him once he was resurrected as the vessel of Chaos. When revealing his true nature, Cath devours Arthur's arm to acquire a fragment of Chaos and attacks the party mutating into a grotesque cat-like monster with the Deadly Sins keeping him at bay until Arthur decides to use his power to absorb Cath back into the Chaos he was created from. Cath returns in the sequel as the real main antagonist, having taken Arthur's body and powers to pose as him to exterminate all non human races in a complex plan to be able to destroy Britannia and the world while ensuring humanity suffers.

=== Oslo ===
Voiced by: Rintarō Nishi (Japanese); Patrick Seitz (Oslo), Crispin Freeman (Rou) (English)

Oslo (オスロー, Osurō) is a Black Hound, a species of sprite that lives in the space between the Fairy World and the Human World, and King's companion.^{[ch. 64]} Oslo is able to alter his size, with his mouth serving as a portal that can transport anything he swallows to another location.^{[ch. 64]} His growling can be understood by King, Elaine, and Hawk. Oslo is later revealed to be the reincarnation of Rou (ロウ), a human from three millennia ago who infiltrated Stigma to seek revenge on them for destroying his village years prior. But his rage wavered when he protects a mortally wounded Gerheade, who reminded him of a girl he loved, and allowed himself to be killed by an enraged Gloxinia. Rou reincarnated into Oslo soon after to continue his vow of protecting Gerheade. Oslo sacrifices his life when Mael tries to attack King with a blast, however, his soul is enchanted by Mael so he can retain his memories of his previous life in his next reincarnation. Oslo came in sixth place in a 2014 character popularity poll for the series.

=== Lady of the Lake ===
Voiced by: Sayaka Ohara (Japanese); Michelle Ruff (English)

The Lady of the Lake (湖の姫, Mizuumi no Hime), also known as the Priestess of Chaos (混沌の巫女, Konton no Miko), is a being of chaos who is bound within the confines of Lake Salisbury and is said to have bestowed the sword Excalibur to king Carfen. Following the Demon King's death, Merlin brings Arthur's body to Lake Salisbury to be revived by the Lady as a "King of Chaos".^{[ch. 335]} After Meliodas demands answers for Merlin's actions of reviving Arthur as a vessel of chaos, the Lady reveals the witch's full story and goals to him and the other Sins.^{[ch. 337]}

=== Cain Barzard ===
Voiced by: Takashi Inagaki (Japanese); Steve Kramer (English)

Cain Barzard (ケイン=バルザド, Kein Baruzado) is an elderly man who led the Deadly Sins to the Vaizel annual fighting festival which he also participates in, revealed to be a Danafall knight and an old comrade from Meliodas's time in Danafall. During their match, having assumed he was fighting Meliodas's son, Cain goes all out while demanding why he destroyed their kingdom. But once Meliodas convinces him that he never betrayed Danafall, Cain accepts the truth and forfeits the match. Cain later visits the Boar Hat and provides Meliodas with Liz's sword.

=== Jenna ===
Voiced by: Himika Akaneya (Japanese); Cherami Leigh (English)

Jenna (ジェンナ) is one of the leaders of the Druids. Residing in their holy land of Istal (イスタール, Isutāru), she holds the position alongside her younger twin sister Zaneri. Lively and teasing compared to her sister, Jenna supervises the training she places Gowther, Arthur and several Holy Knights through in preparation for their battle against the Ten Commandments.^{[ch. 131, 132]} Jenna and Zaneri are revealed to be members of the Goddess race who deserted during the ancient war in disgust of their race's conduct. The two came upon a pair of twin sisters on the verge of death and received their permission to possess their bodies, allowing them to escape the conflict undetected.

=== Zaneri ===
Voiced by: Haruka Chisuga (Japanese); Michelle Ruff (English)

Zaneri (ザネリ) is one of the leaders of the Druids. In contrast to her older twin sister Jenna, Zaneri has dark hair and is quiet. She is serious at her job of supervising the training she places Meliodas through in order to regain his powers that Merlin stole from him 10 years ago and sealed away in Istal. Although Zaneri has feelings for Meliodas, the reason she secretly sabotaged Elizabeth's training is to try and put distance between the princess and Meliodas for fear of what would happen to him should Elizabeth die.^{[ch. 137]} Like Jenna, Zaneri is a member of the Goddess race who possessed the body of a dying human with their permission in order to escape the ancient war.

=== Matrona ===
Voiced by: Rina Satō (Japanese); Allegra Clark (English)

Matrona (マトローナ, Matorōna) is the warrior chief of the Giant clan of Mega Dozer (メガドーザ) village, and Diane's mentor. Known as the "Fang of the Land" (大地の牙), Matrona is a proud giantess, heading into battle for payment and merciless toward her enemies, while honoring and showing respect towards her opponents.^{[vol. 16:Girls Have Impossible Dreams]} She was a friend of Diane's parents and took care of her after they had passed, but her tough personality made them clash a lot. When she and Diane were hired by a group of Liones Holy Knights, the knights deceived them and tried to kill them to gain prestige. Matrona saved Diane from a poisonous arrow and used the last of her strength to take down the knights before seemingly dying.^{[vol. 4:Girls Have Impossible Dreams]} However, she somehow survived and appears just in time to save Diane from Galland and Monspeet. Though the incident cost her her right leg (which she replaced with a peg leg), she was rescued and nursed to health by Zalpa, a barbarian that Diane had spared prior to the incident with the knights. Having been saved, her overall outlook on things changed and now she helps him raise his kids Della and Sol. When her adoptive children fall ill, she accompanies Diane in a search for a cure, joining the tournament prepared by Drole and Gloxinia.

=== Zhivago ===
Voiced by: Junichi Suwabe (Japanese); Marc Diraison (English)

Zhivago (ジバゴ, Jibago) is a werefox thief that Ban met while imprisoned in Aberdeen Prison as a boy. After escaping together, he taught Ban how to steal and treated him like a son.^{[ch. 140]} He also told Ban of the Fountain of Youth in the Fairy King's Forest. One day, Zhivago was forced to choose to save either Ban from people who caught him thieving, or his son Selion from a group of hunters. He chose the latter but arrived too late and Selion died in his arms, and as a result, he believed he had lost them both.^{[ch. 140]} 30 years later, Ban and Jericho find him fallen ill and on the brink of death, and after he tells them his story, Ban recognizes him and reveals his identity to his foster father. After a brief, heartwarming reunion, Zhivago passes away. He later sacrifices his soul to save Ban's soul from being eaten by Galland, despite knowing that he would never see his son Selion again as a result.

=== Dubs ===
Voiced by: Shinichiro Kamio (Japanese); Daman Mills (English)

Dubs (ダブズ, Dabusu) is a craftsman of the Giant race whom Merlin commissioned to create the Coffin of Eternal Darkness, also revealed to have created many other weapons like Meloidas's Lostvayne. He appears in the epilogue film The Seven Deadly Sins: Cursed by Light as one of the antagonists while under the Supreme Deity's control, supplying weapons to maintain Dahlia's spell in those they enthralled to their cause. In the Four Knights of the Apocalypse series, Dubs ends up in Kay Pendragon's services.

=== Guinevere ===
Guinevere (ギネヴィア, Ginevia) is a princess from Cameliard, a small country near where Camelot was originally located, who was forced to leave her homeland after awakening an ability to see into the future. This ability, called Kaleidoscope (百色眼鏡/万華鏡/未来視/カレイドスコープ, Momoiromegane/Mangekyō/Mirai-shi/Kareidosukōpu), allows to see visions of future events within her lifetime in her dreams. She journeyed to Liones to meet Lancelot, whom she believes is her predestined lover despite their relationship destined to end. She is later taken by Ironside to Camelot where she meets King Arthur, warning him that using her powers to change his destiny would have grave consequences.
