= Pecola =

Pecola may refer to:

- Pecola (TV series), a 2001–2002 Japanese animated children's series
- Pecola (robot), a caregiving robot developed by Taiwan's Industrial Technology Research Institute
- Pecola Breedlove, the central character of Toni Morrison's 1970 novel The Bluest Eye
