= Mingei Theatre Company =

Japanese theatre company

- 劇団民藝; Gekidan Mingei
- Formation: 1950
- Type: Theatre group
- Purpose: Shingeki
- Location: Japan
- Website: https://www.gekidanmingei.co.jp

The Mingei Theatre Company (劇団民藝, Gekidan Mingei) is a Japanese theatre company that stages Shingeki plays. Along with the Haiyuza Theatre Company and Bungakuza it is considered one of the "Big Three" among Shingeki theatre troupes.

== History ==
Gekidan Mingei, meaning "The People's Art Theatre Company," was founded in 1950 by Jūkichi Uno, Osamu Takizawa, Tanie Kitabayashi, Hideji Ōtaki, and others. As befitted its name, one of the company's early slogans was "theatre for everyone." At the time of its formation, Gekidan Mingei had only 12 members: 11 actors and 1 director. However, it met with success, and by 1960, it had grown to comprise 119 members, including 52 actors, 13 directors, 16 administrative staff, and 39 apprentices.

In the 1950s, Gekidan Mingei was viewed as strongly left-wing, with many of its members boasting affiliations with the Japan Communist Party (JCP).

In 1960, the members of Gekidan Mingei participated in the Anpo protests against revision of the U.S.-Japan Security Treaty. However, many younger members of the troupe wanted to protest more vigorously, like the radical student activists in the Zengakuren student federation, and resented that the senior members of the troupe forced them to adhere to the JCP's policy of "passive dispersal." At this time, many younger members of the troupe broke away to found the "Youth Art Theatre" (Seinen Geijutsu Gekijō), which helped pioneer the Angura movement of small, avant-garde theatre.

Gekidan Mingei survived and continued to thrive however, and continues to stage plays today, although it has long since dropped the "Shingeki" moniker.

== Notable members ==
Male actors

- Takashi Inagaki
- Yoshi Katō
- Takeshi Miura
- Hideji Ōtaki
- Umeji Sasaki
- Masao Shimizu
- Masami Shimojō
- Osamu Takizawa
- Jūkichi Uno
- Masakane Yonekura

Female actors

- Tomoe Hiiro
- Fumie Kashiyama
- Tanie Kitabayashi
- Tomoko Naraoka
- Kazuko Yoshiyuki
