= Takeshi Miura =

Japanese actor (1938–2013)

Takeshi Miura (三浦 威, Miura Takeshi, April 2, 1938 – December 9, 2013) was a Japanese actor.

He was married to actress Etsuko Takeuchi.

== Life ==
After studying acting at the Mizushina Acting Studio (from 1957), at the Gekidan Mingei Acting Class, and honing his skills at the Gekidan Seinen Geijutsu Gekijo, he joined the Gekidan Mingei Theater in 1968.

He died on December 9, 2013, from pneumonia.

== Appearances (selection) ==
=== Stage ===
- 島 (Shima, "The Island"), 1968
- もう一人のヒト (Mo hitori no hito, "One more person"), author: Tadashi Iizawa, 1970,
- 破戒 (Hakai, "The Breaking of the Buddhist Commandments"), author: Tōson Shimazaki, 1971
- 胎内（Tainai, "In the Womb"), author: Jūrō Miyoshi, 1973
- 星の牧場（Hoshi no Makiba, "The Meadow of Stars", author: Eiji Shōno, 1979
- エレジー 父の夢は舞う（Erejii Chichi no Yume wa Mau, "Elegy The Father's Dream Dances", author: Kunio Shimizu, 1983
- グレイ・クリスマス（Gurei Kurisumasu, "Gray Christmas", author: Ren Saitō, from 1992 to 1999
- オットーと呼ばれる日本人（Ottō to Yobareru Nihonjin, "The Japanese called Otto", author: Junji Kinoshita, 2000
- 白バラの祈り（Shiroi Bara no Ori, author: リリアン・グローブ作、2007, 2012
- アンネの日記, (Anne no Nikki), 2011
- 帰還（Kikan, "The Repatriation", author: Yōji Sakate, 2011

=== Movies ===
- 女子大学生 私は勝負する(Joshi Daigakusei Watashi wa Shōbu Suru, 1959)
- 戦争と人間 (映画) 第三部・完結篇(Sensō to Ningen Dai 3-bu Kanketsu-hen, 1973)

=== Television ===
- あこがれ (Akogare)
- ウルトラマン 第11話「宇宙から来た暴れん坊」(Ultraman) 1966 - 記者
- おかあさん (Okāsan)
- 父娘 (Chichi Musume)
- 火山脈 (Kazanmyaku, "The Volcanic Chain")
- 項羽と劉邦
- 三匹の侍#三匹の侍 第4シリーズ|三匹の侍 第4シリーズ
- 純愛シリーズ (Junai shirīzu)
- 新十郎捕物帖・快刀乱麻
- 青春オリンピック (Seishun Orinpikku)
- 遠山の金さん捕物帳
- どこにもいない (Doko nimo Inai)
- なつかしき海の歌 (Natsukashiki Umi no Uta)
- 不屈の青春 (Fukutsu no Seinen)
- 松山家の人びと (Matsuyamake no Hitobito)
- 良寛さまと子供たち (Yoshihiro sama to Kodomotachi)
- 若い山河 (Wakai Sanga)

=== Entertainment ===
- よくみよう(Yoku miyō), 1968
