= Umeji Sasaki =

Japanese actor and voice actor

- Born: Oketo, Hokkaido, Japan
- Occupations: Actor, voice actor
- Years active: 1973–present

Umeji Sasaki (佐々木梅治, Sasaki Umeji) is a Japanese actor and voice actor from Oketo, Hokkaido attached to Gekidan Mingei. He is a graduate of Hokkaidō Kitami Hokuto High School and Ritsumeikan University's College of Business Administration.

== Filmography ==
=== Television animation ===
- Eat-Man (1997) – Zolmin
- Arc the Lad (1999) – Bibiga
- Pecola (2002) – Pecolius
- Eyeshield 21 (2005) – Musashi's father
- Play Ball (2005) – Taniguchi's father
- Fist of the Blue Sky (2006) – Lǐ Yǒng-Jiàn
- Kiba (2006) – Sebastian
- Play Ball 2nd (2006) – Taniguchi's father
- A Spirit of the Sun (2006) – Ozu
- Claymore (2007) – Bishop Kamari
- Golgo 13 (2008) – Newsmonger
- Michiko & Hatchin (2008) – Hoan
- Ronja, the Robber's Daughter (2014) – Noddle-Pete

=== Theatrical animation ===
- Naruto the Movie: Guardians of the Crescent Moon Kingdom (2006) – Shabadaba

=== Net animation ===
- Japan Sinks: 2020, Kunio Ashida

=== Dubbing roles ===
- Lee Arenberg
  - Pirates of the Caribbean: The Curse of the Black Pearl – Pintel
  - Pirates of the Caribbean: Dead Man's Chest – Pintel
  - Pirates of the Caribbean: At World's End – Pintel
- 50 First Dates – Dr. Joseph Keats (Dan Aykroyd)
- Alien 3 – Harold Andrews (Brian Glover)
- The Assignment – Amos (Ben Kingsley)
- Asteroid (1997 TV Asahi edition) – Dr. Matthew Rogers (Michael Weatherly)
- Behind Enemy Lines – Piquet (Joaquim de Almeida)
- A Bridge Too Far (2007 DVD edition) – Frederick Browning (Dirk Bogarde)
- The Bridge on the River Kwai (2006 DVD edition) – Major Warden (Jack Hawkins)
- Broken Arrow (2002 TV Asahi edition) – Colonel Max Wilkins (Delroy Lindo)
- Charlie's Angels (2003 TV Asahi edition) – Roger Corwin (Tim Curry)
- Cold Case – John Stillman (John Finn)
- Dae Jang Geum – Kang Deok Goo (Im Hyun-sik)
- Desperate Housewives – Doctor Albert Goldfine (Sam Lloyd)
- Diamonds Are Forever (2006 DVD edition) – Ernst Stavro Blofeld (Charles Gray)
- Dragonheart: A New Beginning – Master Kwan (Henry O)
- Dudley Do-Right – Snidely Whiplash (Alfred Molina)
- End of Days – Dr. Abel (Udo Kier)
- The Fifth Element (Blu-ray edition) – Father Vito Cornelius (Ian Holm)
- The Godfather (2001 DVD edition) – Moe Greene (Alex Rocco)
- The Godfather (2008 Blu-Ray edition) – Philip Tattaglia (Victor Rendina), Amerigo Bonasera
- Hollow Man – Dr. Howard Kramer (William Devane)
- The Host – Park Hee-bong (Byun Hee-bong)
- Indiana Jones and the Last Crusade (2009 WOWOW edition) – Walter Donovan (Julian Glover)
- Jaws (2005 DVD edition) – Mayor Larry Vaughn (Murray Hamilton)
- The Ladykillers – The General (Tzi Ma)
- Lara Croft: Tomb Raider (2004 Fuji TV edition) – Distinguished Gentleman (Richard Johnson)
- Licence to Kill (2006 DVD edition) – Milton Krest (Anthony Zerbe)
- The Man with the Golden Gun (2006 DVD edition) – Francisco Scaramanga (Christopher Lee)
- The Mummy Returns (2006 Fuji TV edition) – Baltus Hafez (Alun Armstrong)
- Munich – Ephraim (Geoffrey Rush)
- Never Talk to Strangers – Henry Taylor (Len Cariou)
- Out for a Kill – Wong Dai (Chooi Kheng-Beh)
- Payback (2001 NTV edition) – Phil (John Glover)
- Pearl Harbor (2004 TV Asahi edition) – Captain Thurman (Dan Aykroyd)
- Plunkett & Macleane – Thief Taker General Chance (Ken Stott)
- Proof of Life – Ted Fellner (Anthony Heald)
- RoboCop 3 (1996 TV Asahi edition) – Kanemitsu (Mako)
- Sahara – Admiral James Sandecker (William H. Macy)
- Saw V – FBI Agent Dan Erickson (Mark Rolston)
- Scarface (2004 DVD edition) — Mel Bernstein (Harris Yulin)
- Shaolin Soccer (International version) – "Golden Leg" Fung (Ng Man-tat)
- Son of the Mask (2009 NTV edition) – Doctor Arthur Neuman (Ben Stein)
- Spy Kids (Netflix/Hulu edition) – Alexander Minion (Tony Shalhoub)
- Succession – Logan Roy (Brian Cox)
- Sudden Death – Joshua Foss (Powers Boothe)
- U Turn – Blind Indian (Jon Voight)
- The West Wing – Doctor Stanley Keyworth (Adam Arkin)

==== Animation ====
- Batman: The Brave and the Bold – Wildcat
- Jang Geum's Dream – Kang Deok Goo
- Bionicle 2: Legends of Metru Nui
- Toy Story 2 – Emperor Zurg
- Toy Story 3 – Zurg

==== Other ====
- Star Tours (Darth Vader)
- Pirates of the Caribbean (Pintel)
- Toy Story Mania! (Zurg)
