= Pecola (TV series) =

Canadian-Japanese children's television series

- Genre: Comedy
- Created by: Naomi Iwata
- Based on: Pecola characters by Naomi Iwata
- Directed by: Mike Fallows; Dan Wakabayashi; Bill Giggie (season 2)
- Voices of: (See Voice cast section)
- Theme music composer: Martin Kucaj; Arlene Bishop; Blair Packham
- Composer: Martin Kucaj
- Countries of origin: Japan; Canada
- Original language: English
- No. of seasons: 2
- No. of episodes: 26 (52 segments)

Production
- Executive producers: Michael Hirsh; Naomi Iwata; Patrick Loubert (season 1); Clive A. Smith (season 1); Scott Dyer (season 2); Makoto Toriyama
- Producer: Kim Cleary
- Running time: 30 minutes (2 15–minute episodes per segment)
- Production companies: Milky Cartoon Ltd. Yomiko Advertising Inc. Nelvana Limited

Original release
- Network: Teletoon (Canada); TV Tokyo (Japan)
- Release: September 3, 2001 – September 18, 2002

Related
- Midnight Horror School

Pecola (Japanese: ペコラ, Pekora) is an animated preschool children's television series that features cube-shaped anthropomorphic animals in a place named Cube Town. The series is based on a series of children's picture books by Naomi Iwata. It was first aired on Teletoon in Canada on September 3, 2001, with the final episode being aired on September 18, 2002. In Japan, the show aired on TV Tokyo, and in the United States, the show aired on Cartoon Network in 2003. Prior to that, a series of Pecola shorts aired on Fuji Television as part of Ponkickies during 1998.

== Premise ==
The show that focuses on Pecola, a curious and hyperactive penguin who tries to help the people of Cube Town, but often wreaks havoc instead. Pecola is an orphaned penguin who lives with Pecolius, his grandfather. Cube Town is a small, isolated coastal village which contains an art museum, a beach, a lighthouse and a canal. It is located adjacent to Crescent Bay surrounded by the Rookery Mountains coastal range and serviced by regular ships (including a weekly freighter) which deliver mail, food and other supplies, as well as occasional tourists from a nearby metropolis named Cubic City. The heights above it lead into Glacier Valley which is snowbound even during summer.

== Voice cast ==
=== English-language cast ===
- Austin Di Iulio as Pecola and Robo-Pecola
- Stephanie Beard as Coco
- Richard Binsley as Jabbatt
- Donald Burda as Gazelle
- Keith Hampshire as Mayor Papazoni
- Len Carlson as Officer Kumada
- Michael Cera as Robbie Rabbit
- William Colgate as Dr. Hornbender
- Neil Crone as Dr. Chu
- Jill Frappier as Aunty Yorkshire
- Jake Goldsbie as Rudy
- George Buza as Rory
- Tracey Hoyt as Hilary
- Howard Jerome as Mr. Bernard
- Keith Knight as Al A. Gator
- Julie Lemieux as Miss Lucky
- Sharron Matthews as Steamer
- Marla Lukofsky as Mrs. Bernard
- Miriam McDonald as Chewy
- Sunday Muse as Cori
- Scott McCord as Bashatt
- Peter Oldring as Bongo
- Stephen Ouimette as Mr. Saruyama
- Avery Saltzman as Mr. Puggalski
- Adrian Truss as Mr. Lonely
- Chris Wiggins as Pecolius

=== Japanese-language cast ===
- Mayumi Asano as Pecola and Robo-Pecola
- Naoko Takano as Coco
- Umeji Sasaki as Pecolius
- Romi Park as Rabi-san
- Mitsuaki Hoshino as Gao-san
- Ryusei Nakao as Saru-yama
- Kenyu Horiuchi as Gazelle
- Yu Shimaka as Mayor Papazōni
- Chika Sakamoto as Tsunekichi
- Miyu Matsuki as Cori
- Takeshi Kusao as Jabatto-san
- Dai Matsumoto as Banaado-san

== Characters ==
- Pecola (ペコラ) – A penguin who brings excitement to the otherwise dull and boring town. Unlike his fellow penguins, Pecola cannot swim. His catchphrases include "Flapping flippers!" and "Let's get hopping!" Pecola has a special love of pudding and a reputation for pulling pranks. Despite his antics, Pecola is very friendly and caring.
- Little Chu (リトルチュー) /Chewy – A mouse who is the grandson of the great inventor Dr. Chu, and a budding inventor in his own right. He is one of Pecola's best friends and often unwilling ally in different escapades. He often complains of having a funny feeling in his stomach just before things get out of hand.
- Dr. Chu (ドクターチュー) – A mouse who is Little Chu's grandfather. He is Cube Town's greatest inventor and he often invents gadgets that help others on the island. His inventions are often used by Pecola and Chewy in their adventures. He is also friends with Pecola's grandfather, Pecolias. He owns two vehicles one is a submarine and also an airplane called the Mad Mouse which sits on top his laboratory. He also likes to collect comics.
- Coco (ココ) – Another penguin who is another one of Pecola's best friends. She is more down-to-earth than Pecola, and is sometimes frustrated by his antics. She loves to sing; unfortunately, she is terrible at it.
- Mr. Saruyama (サル山さん) – A monkey who runs a fruit stand in town. He is often the target of Pecola's pranks, often leading to his melons falling over, which is a running gag in the show. However, he cares very much about Pecola, no matter what he does. He also runs the town's newspaper, the "Town Crier". He also cries a lot.
- Gao (ガオさん) /Rory – A lion who is Cube Town's postman. He is determined and dedicated to his job, he has never missed a day of work which won him the postman of the year award in, though he did get sick in during this episode it was revealed when he was younger he wasn't as good at delivering the post, but learned from his mistakes and created rules to help him with his job.
- Pug (パグさん)/Mr. Puggalski – A pug who owns a grocery store. He is a descendant of the personal chef of the former king of Cube Town. He is also said to be the world's greatest hide and seek player (hide and go sleep) though when nobody could find him he was sick at home and still won.
- Dr. Kamikutta/Dr. Hornbender (カミクッタ博士) – An old goat astronomer who lives and works at the observatory. His greatest dream is the discovery of new planets, constellations, and aliens. Along with getting a shooting star named after him.
- Rabi (ラビ) /Robbie – A nervous rabbit who likes video games.
- Mayor Papazoni (パパゾーニ市長) – An elephant who is the mayor of Cube Town. The mayor who makes long and boring speeches. Papazoni travels in a helicopter that he pilots himself. He hides in secret tunnels under the city and at a Mayoral Retreat to work on his speeches, undisturbed by residents and their questions. Constantly refers to the citizens of Cube Town as "voters". His voice is an imitation of veteran newsman Walter Cronkite.
- Steam / Stim (スチム) / Steamer – A cat train mechanic and engineer. Chewy, Pecola, and Rudy are smitten with her, which is the cause of tensions and arguments among the three. Her train, The Cactus, is intended eventually to provide a direct link with Cubic City via a tunnel being constructed under the Rookery Mountains. She often stops her work on the engine to play soccer with Pecola and his friends.
- Aunty Yorkshire (ヨークシャおばさん) – A pig who does the laundry for the town and is often one of the few adults tolerant of Pecola's shenanigans. Whenever Pecolius is away she's the one to often babysit Pecola. She also has a son who lives in Cubic City and often says Pecola reminds her of him.
- Mr. Bernard (バナードさん) and Mrs. Bernard (バナードの奥さん) – Two beagles. They run the town's bakery, though Mr. Bernard often falls asleep on the job and is credited by others for his wife's work.
- Jabbatt (ジャバット) and Bashatt (バシャット) – Two tortoises. They are Cube Town's firemen, although there are never fires in Cube Town. Despite this, they often help out around town, and they often provide comic relief when they bump into each other.
- Officer Kumada (クマダ巡査) – A bear. He helps keep the Cube Town safe with his many rules and observations.
- Mr. Lonely (ロンリーさん) – A wolf. He is a poet who is fond of writing and reciting sad poetry. He also once rapped in Coco's concert but is unable to write poetry when in a happy mood.
- Gazelle (ガゼルさん) – A vain gazelle who is Hillary's boyfriend. He dreams of being a modern artist. He owns a convertible that he lovingly maintains and often drives about in Cube Town. He also owns a jet ski. In addition to art he loves to collect belt buckles.
- Srally (スラリーさん)/Hillary – A giraffe who is Gazelle's girlfriend. She owns Cube Town Art Museum and is very fashionable. She is also picky about her weight, which is a running gag in the show.
- Miss Lucky – A blue cat who reports for Cube Town News. She also helped Pecola make a movie.
- Golagola/Gola Gola (ゴラゴラ) – A friendly sea creature who saved Pecola from drowning. At first, the town feared him, but they came to accept him. He has helped with different beach activities and is often seen playing with Pecola and his friends at the beach.
- Tsunekichi (ツネキチ) /Rudy – Pecola's fox friend whose catchphrases are "I knew that" and "I was going to say/ask that". He is prone to bragging and showing off his latest toys, not sharing and declaring he is the best at whatever activity he is engaged in.
- Cori (コリ) – A squirrel that runs Cori's Cafe as chef and waitperson.
- Bongo (ボンゴさん) – A very strong and athletic gorilla who is kind, but is often clumsy as he either bumps into something or breaks something though apologizes for it with a "sorry". In "The Mysterious Pecola", it was revealed he collects model cars.
- Pecolius (ペコリウス) – A penguin. Pecola's grandfather who bears a resemblance to Indiana Jones because of his adventures in the name of science and archeology. He appreciates Pecola's unique personality, but at times reminds him to stay out of trouble.
- Robo-Pecola (ロボペコラ) – A robot version of Pecola who was built by Dr. Chu to teach Pecola better manners as revealed in his debut in "Double Trouble". Though his various glitches lead him to cause more trouble than the real Pecola. But like Pecola, Robo-Pecola is very friendly and caring.
- Alligetao (アリゲタオ)/Al A. Gator – A mysterious alligator. He is seen sneaking around Cube Town, taking pictures.
- Brock the Block (ブロック・ザ・ブロック) – A badger who is a reporter in Cubic City who hosts and interviewed the show "Big City Life" where he interviews successful people in Cubic City.
- Jet Ranger (ジェットレンジャー)/Power Chum – A gorilla superhero on TV that is Pecola's favourite. He looks like Bongo except wearing red superhero tights, cape, and mask. He can fly and has super strength. He inspired Pecola to become Peco Ranger (ペコレンジャー)/Power Pecola.

== Episodes ==
=== Season 1 (2001) ===
No.	Segment 1	Segment 2	Original airdate (Teletoon)	Prod. code
1	Double Troubles (pilot) (ぺコラとロボぺコラ)	Detective Pecola (探偵ペコラ)	September 3, 2001	101
2	Constellation Pecola (ペコラ座)	Good Deeds (いいこと大作戦)	September 4, 2001	102
3	Fire Drill Frenzy (ハチャメチャカメ兄弟)	Hurricane Pecola (竜巻の缶詰)	September 5, 2001	103
4	Robo-Rocket (ロボロケット)	Mayor Muddle (ドタバタ市長選挙)	September 6, 2001	104
5	Your Wish is My Command (願い事はおまかせ)	Robbie to the Rescue (ラビはスーパーヒーロー)	September 7, 2001	105
6	One Lonely Night (おばけのロンリー)	Miss Lucky's Bloopers (ミスラッキーの大ボケ大賞)	September 10, 2001	106
7	Spring Cleaning (大掃除をしよう)	Monster Moth (怪獣あらわる!)	September 11, 2001	107
8	The Cube Town Tri-Brag-a-Thon (ウソつき大レース)	The Wild Ride (走れカクタス号)	September 12, 2001	108
9	Half Baked (パンを作ろう!)	Hide 'N' Go Sleep (かくれんぼチャンピオン)	September 13, 2001	109
10	Not Seeing is Disbelieving (ペコラは透明人間)	Melancholy Pecola (ペコラのなやみ)	September 14, 2001	110
11	Pecola's Penguin Special (ペンギンスペシャル)	Bot and Switch (にせものロボペコラ)	September 17, 2001	111
12	Golagola (海のゴラゴラ)	Operation Papazoni (パパゾーニ大作戦)	September 18, 2001	112
13	High and Dry (カラカラのお天気)	Two Brilliant Inventors (がんばれリトルチュー)	September 19, 2001	113

=== Season 2 (2002) ===
No.	Segment 1	Segment 2	Original airdate (Teletoon)	Prod. code
14	Ode to Pecola (ペコラに贈る詩)	Laundry Quandary (スーパー吸い取りマシン)	September 2, 2002	114
15	Cool It! (涼しくなりたい!)	Yeti or Not (雪男を探せ!)	September 3, 2002	115
16	The Curse of Cube Town (キューブタウンの呪い)	Postman Pecola (ペコラの郵便屋さん)	September 4, 2002	116
17	Runaway Pecola (ペコラの家出)	Pecola's Island (ペコラS・O・S!)	September 5, 2002	117
18	The Town Crier (ペコラ新聞)	Pecola Grows Horns (ペコラにツノが生えた?)	September 6, 2002	118
19	Coco's Concert (ココのコンサート)	Spaceman Pecola (ペコラは宇宙人?)	September 9, 2002	119
20	A Career Day (大人になったら...)	Power Pecola (ゆけ!ペコレンジャー!)	September 11, 2002	120
21	Robo-Rudy (ツネキチロボット)	Lights, Camera, Pecola! (ライト、カメラ、ペコラ!)	September 10, 2002	121
22	Prince Puggalski (パグさんは王子さま!?)	Painting Pecola (ペンキ塗りペコラ)	September 12, 2002	122
23	Pecola and the Pirates (海賊ペコラ!)	Mysterious Pecola (ペコラとスパイ!)	September 13, 2002	123
24	Gazelle's Goof (ひとりぼっちのガゼルさん)	Pecola in a Yacht of Trouble (ヨットレースは大騒ぎ)	September 16, 2002	124
25	Yorkshire's Pudding (ヨークシャおばさんのプリン)	Pecola's Tunnel Trouble (トンネル大冒険)	September 17, 2002	125
26	Yo! Pecola (ぼくはヨーヨー名人)	Great Cubes of Fire! (四角い花火)	September 18, 2002	126

== Telecast and home media ==
Pecola first aired on Teletoon in Canada from September 3, 2001, with the final episode airing on September 18, 2002, with repeats until the mid-2000s. In Japan, the show aired on TV Tokyo at 9 A.M. to 9:30 A.M. on Sundays from October 6, 2002, until March 30, 2003. In 2003, Pecola premiered on Cartoon Network in the U.S., and also aired on the now-defunct Qubo from 2007 to 2017, then started airing again from April 5, 2020, to July 26 of that year. The show also aired on Spacetoon in Indonesia from 2005 until 2013, and on RTÉ2 in Ireland from 2002 to 2003.

The show was released to DVD in Japan, Australia, France, and Taiwan. A DVD release of the show in the U.S. has yet to be announced; however it is available on Amazon Video.

== Video game ==
In Japan, an educational game based on the shorts was released for the Sega Pico entitled Pecola no Daibouken Maboroshi no Aisukurīmu wo Sagase! (ペコラのだいぼうけん まぼろしのアイスクリームをさがせ!).
