= Takashi Inagaki =

Japanese actor and voice actor (1937–2025)

- Born: Inagaki Takashi; May 11, 1937; Japan
- Died: March 12, 2025 (aged 87)
- Occupations: Actor, voice actor
- Years active: 1950–2025
- Website: http://sitaka.at.infoseek.co.jp

Takashi Inagaki (稲垣隆史, Inagaki Takashi; May 11, 1937 – March 12, 2025) was a Japanese actor and voice actor affiliated with Mingei Theatre Company. Inagaki died on March 12, 2025, at the age of 87.

== Filmography ==
=== Film ===
- Zassô no yô na inochi (1960) - Gorô Kanzaki
- Jamamono wa kese (1960) - Teppei Tanaka
- Kurenai no umi (1961)
- B.G. monogatari: nijusai no nikki (1961)
- Ankokugai gekimetsu meirei (1961) - Hasegawa
- Ashita aru kagiri (1962)
- Nippon musekinin jidai (1962)
- Kyomo ware ozorami ari (1964)
- Hadaka no jûyaku (1964) - Yamauchi
- None but the Brave (1965) - Pvt. Ishi

=== Television animation ===
- Kobo-chan (????) (Iwao Sansen)
- Saishū Heiki Kanojo (2002) (Akemi's father) (ep. 10)
- Taiyō no Mokushiroku (????) (Takuma Yanagi)
- Yakitate!! Japan (2005) (Gaia) (ep. 29)
- Golgo 13 (2008) (Coleman) (ep. 39)
- Soul Eater (2008-2009) (Mosquito)

=== Animated films ===
- The Saga of Tanya the Evil (2019) (Joseph Dzhugaschvili)

=== Video games ===
- Kingdom Hearts II (2005) (Yen Sid)
- Kingdom Hearts Birth by Sleep (2010) (Yen Sid)
- Kingdom Hearts Re:coded (2010) (Yen Sid)
- Epic Mickey (2011) (Yen Sid)
- Kingdom Hearts 3D: Dream Drop Distance (2012) (Yen Sid)
- Epic Mickey 2: The Power of Two (2013) (Yen Sid)
- Berserk and the Band of the Hawk (2016) (Godo)
- Kingdom Hearts HD 2.8 Final Chapter Prologue (2017) (Yen Sid)
- Kingdom Hearts III (2019) (Yen Sid)

=== Dubbing roles ===
==== Live-action ====
- Donald Sutherland
  - The Pillars of the Earth (Earl Bartholomew)
  - The Hunger Games (President Coriolanus Snow)
  - The Best Offer (Billy Whistler)
  - The Hunger Games: Catching Fire (President Coriolanus Snow)
  - The Hunger Games: Mockingjay – Part 1 (President Coriolanus Snow)
  - The Hunger Games: Mockingjay – Part 2 (President Coriolanus Snow)
- Michael Gambon
  - Plunkett & Macleane (Lord Gibson)
  - Charlotte Gray (Levade)
  - High Heels and Low Lifes (Kerrigan)
  - Layer Cake (Eddie Temple)
  - The Good Shepherd (Dr. Fredericks)
- Brian Cox
  - X2 (William Stryker)
  - Match Point (Alec Hewett)
  - Rise of the Planet of the Apes (John Landon)
  - X-Men: Days of Future Past (William Stryker)
  - Morgan (Jim Bryce)
- Anthony Hopkins
  - Alexander (Ptolemy I Soter)
  - Hitchcock (Alfred Hitchcock)
  - Proof (Robert Llewellyn)
  - Westworld (Robert Ford)
- 12 Angry Men (2003 NHK edition) (Juror #4 (Armin Mueller-Stahl))
- Alice in Wonderland (Jabberwocky)
- The American (Father Benedetto (Paolo Bonacelli))
- Argo (Lester Siegel (Alan Arkin))
- Armageddon (2004 NTV edition) (President of the United States (Stanley Anderson))
- Before the Devil Knows You're Dead (Charles Hanson (Albert Finney))
- Ben-Hur (2000 TV Tokyo edition) (Quintus Arrius (Jack Hawkins))
- Bruce Almighty (Jack Baylor (Philip Baker Hall))
- Chocolat (Comte de Reynaud (Alfred Molina))
- Damages (Hollis Nye (Philip Bosco))
- Damo (Jung Pil-joon (Jung Wook))
- Dangerous Beauty (Domenico Venier (Fred Ward))
- Eastern Promises (Semyon (Armin Mueller-Stahl))
- Elizabeth I (William Cecil, 1st Baron Burghley (Ian McDiarmid))
- End of Days (Father Kovak (Rod Steiger), Businessman (Steve Kramer))
- ER (Doctor Donald Anspaugh (John Aylward))
- From Russia with Love (2006 DVD edition) (Ernst Stavro Blofeld (Anthony Dawson))
- Frost/Nixon (Richard Nixon (Frank Langella))
- Get Smart (The President (James Caan))
- The Girl with the Dragon Tattoo (Henrik Vanger (Christopher Plummer))
- The Golden Compass (Magisterial Emissary (Derek Jacobi))
- The Great Escape (2000 TV Tokyo edition) (Sandy MacDonald (Gordon Jackson))
- I Spy (Arnold Gundars (Malcolm McDowell))
- Insomnia (2006 TV Tokyo edition) (Chief Nyback (Paul Dooley))
- The Legend of Bagger Vance (Narrator / Old Hardy Greaves (Jack Lemmon))
- Lord of War (Simeon Weisz (Ian Holm))
- Miss Peregrine's Home for Peculiar Children (Abraham "Abe" Portman (Terence Stamp))
- Monk (Doctor Neven Bell (Héctor Elizondo))
- No Good Deed (Mr. Thomas Quarre (Joss Ackland))
- Ocean's Twelve (2007 NTV edition) (Gaspar LeMarc (Albert Finney))
- Panic Room (2004 TV Asahi edition) (Stephen Altman (Patrick Bauchau))
- Promised Land (Frank Yates (Hal Holbrook))
- Roswell (River Dog (Ned Romero))
- Rush (Louis Stanley (David Calder))
- Spider-Man (General Slocum (Stanley Anderson))
- Star Wars: Episode III – Revenge of the Sith (Palpatine (Ian McDiarmid))
- The Sound of Music (50th Anniversary edition) (Herr Zeller (Ben Wright))
- The Sum of All Fears (2004 Fuji TV edition) (National Security Advisor Gene Revell (Bruce McGill))
- Superman Returns (Perry White (Frank Langella))
- Terminator 3: Rise of the Machines (2005 NTV edition) (Dr. Peter Silberman (Earl Boen))
- Titanic (Fuji TV and NTV editions) (Spicer Lovejoy (David Warner))
- Tokyo Trial (William Patrick (Paul Freeman))
- Tusk (Howard Howe (Michael Parks))
- You Only Live Twice (2006 DVD edition) (Ernst Stavro Blofeld (Donald Pleasence))

==== Animation ====
- House of Mouse (Magic Mirror)
- Megamind (Warden)
- Lego Star Wars: The Empire Strikes Out (Palpatine)
- Lego Star Wars: The Padawan Menace (Darth Sidious)
- Star Wars: The Clone Wars (Palpatine)
- Star Wars Rebels (Palpatine/Darth Sidious)
