= The Seven Deadly Sins: Seven Days =

Japanese light novel

- Light novel cover

七つの大罪 セブンデイズ (Nanatsu no Taizai Sebun Deizu)
- Light novel
- Written by: Mamoru Iwasa
- Illustrated by: Nakaba Suzuki
- Published by: Kodansha
- Published: December 26, 2014
- Manga

The Seven Deadly Sins: Seven Days ~The Thief and the Holy Girl~
- Written by: Mamoru Iwasa
- Illustrated by: Yō Kokukuji
- Published by: Kodansha
- English publisher: NA: Kodansha USA
- Magazine: Shōnen Magazine Edge
- Original run: January 17, 2017 – August 17, 2017
- Volumes: 2
- icon

The Seven Deadly Sins: Seven Days (Japanese: 七つの大罪 セブンデイズ, Hepburn: Nanatsu no Taizai Sebun Deizu) is a Japanese light novel written by Mamoru Iwasa and released by Kodansha in December 2014. It is a spin-off to Nakaba Suzuki's manga series The Seven Deadly Sins. A manga adaptation, illustrated by Yō Kokukuji, was serialized in Kodansha's Shōnen Magazine Edge from January to August 2017.

== Release ==
The Seven Deadly Sins: Seven Days light novel, written by Mamoru Iwasa, was released by Kodansha on December 26, 2014. A manga adaptation, illustrated by Yō Kokukuji and subtitled The Thief and the Holy Girl (～盗賊と聖少女～, ~Tōzoku to Seishōjo~), was serialized in Kodansha's shōnen manga magazine Shōnen Magazine Edge from January 17 to August 17, 2017. Kodansha collected its chapters in two tankōbon volumes, released on July 14 and October 17, 2017.

In North America, Kodansha USA announced the English release of the manga in July 2018. The two volumes were released on October 2 and December 4, 2018.
