= The Seven Deadly Sins (manga) =

Japanese manga series by Nakaba Suzuki

- First tankōbon volume cover, featuring Elizabeth Liones (left), Meliodas (center) and Hawk (right)

七つの大罪 (Nanatsu no Taizai)
- Genre: Adventure; Fantasy
- Manga
- Written by: Nakaba Suzuki
- Published by: Kodansha
- Imprint: Shōnen Magazine Comics
- Magazine: Weekly Shōnen Magazine
- Original run: October 10, 2012 – March 25, 2020
- Volumes: 41
- Anime television series
- Directed by: Tensai Okamura (S1); Tomokazu Tokoro (SP); Jōji Furuta (S2); Susumu Nishizawa (S3–4)
- Produced by: Kyouko Uryuu (S1, SP, S2); Kensuke Tateishi (S1, SP, S2); Kozue Kaneniwa (S1, SP); Tetsuya Endou (S1, SP); Takamitsu Inoue (S1); Ryuu Hashimoto (S1); Hiroshi Kamei (SP, S2); Naoto Kase (S2); Yoshinori Hasegawa (S2); Akiko Nabeiwa (S2); Muneyuki Kii (S2); Makoto Furukawa (S2); Yousuke Takabayashi (S3–4)
- Written by: Shōtarō Suga (S1); Yuniko Ayana (SP); Takao Yoshioka (S2); Rintarou Ikeda (S3–4)
- Music by: Hiroyuki Sawano; Takafumi Wada (Note: Credited from the second half of the first season to the fourth and final); Kohta Yamamoto (S2–4)
- Studio: A-1 Pictures (S1, SP, S2); Studio Deen (Note: Animation production assistance (アニメーション制作協力) for seasons 3 and 4 provided by Marvy Jack.) (S3–4)
- Licensed by: Netflix (streaming); Crunchyroll LLC (Note: Formerly known as Funimation.) (S1, home video); SEA: Muse Communication
- Original network: JNN (MBS, TBS) (S1, SP, S2); TXN (TV Tokyo), BS TV Tokyo (S3–4)
- English network: SEA: Animax Asia
- Original run: October 5, 2014 – June 23, 2021
- Episodes: 100 + 3 OVA
- Anime films
- Prisoners of the Sky (2018); Cursed by Light (2021); Grudge of Edinburgh (2022–2023)
- Sequel
- Four Knights of the Apocalypse (2021–present)
- Other manga and light novels
- The Seven Deadly Sins: Seven Days; Mayoe! The Seven Deadly Sins Academy!; The Seven Deadly Sins Production; The Seven Deadly Sins: King's Road to Manga; The Vampires of Edinburgh
- icon

The Seven Deadly Sins (Japanese: 七つの大罪, Hepburn: Nanatsu no Taizai) is a Japanese manga series written and illustrated by Nakaba Suzuki. It was serialized in Kodansha's shōnen manga magazine Weekly Shōnen Magazine from October 2012 to March 2020, with the chapters collected into 41 tankōbon volumes. Featuring a setting similar to the European Middle Ages, the story follows a titular group of knights representing the seven deadly sins. The manga has been licensed by Kodansha USA for English publication in North America, while the chapters were released digitally by Crunchyroll in over 170 countries as they were published in Japan.

A-1 Pictures adapted the series into a three-season anime television series that ran from October 2014 to June 2018, and one theatrical film: Prisoners of the Sky. Studio Deen produced two further seasons that ran from October 2019 to June 2021, and a second theatrical film: Cursed by Light. Alfred Imageworks and Marvy Jack then produced a two-part film for Netflix: Grudge of Edinburgh, released in 2022 and 2023. Funimation licensed the home video rights to the first season, while Netflix acquired the English streaming rights to the anime and films.

In 2015, The Seven Deadly Sins won the 39th Kodansha Manga Award in the shōnen category. The manga has over 55 million copies in circulation, making it one of the best-selling manga series. In 2021, Suzuki began Four Knights of the Apocalypse as a sequel to the series.

== Premise ==
The Seven Deadly Sins are a band of knights in the land of Britannia (ブリタニア, Buritania) who had disbanded ten years earlier after being framed for plotting a coup against the Liones Kingdom, the Holy Knights who sequestered them before taking control in the wake of a rebellion they organized. Liones' third princess, Elizabeth Liones, finds the Seven Deadly Sins' leader, Meliodas, before they track down his comrades so they can clear their names and liberate Liones from the Holy Knights, who were manipulated by a demon named Fraudrin into unsealing the Demon Race from their prison.

== Production ==
The Seven Deadly Sins began as a one-shot that was published in Kodansha's Weekly Shōnen Magazine on November 22, 2011. Nakaba Suzuki drew more than twenty versions of the pilot chapter. One of these manuscripts, "Chapter X", was released in English on Kodansha USA's website in 2015. For the series, Suzuki borrowed the names of characters from tales about King Arthur, but used his original ideas for their personalities and the story itself. He explained that ever since he had become a manga artist, he had wanted to write a fantasy story with King Arthur as a motif, "but I couldn't draw the characters and it was always rejected" by the editorial department. So he started drawing modern manga stories as a way to practice, and eventually lost interest in fantasy until his editor read one of his earlier one-shots and suggested it. "In that sense, it's a very emotional thing. I think if I had drawn it when I was younger, it wouldn't have turned out like this."

The relationship between Meliodas and Elizabeth was decided on from the beginning, but the author thought up everything else weekly as he went in order to keep it unpredictable. In order to surprise readers, he purposely made the appearances of some of the titular group of knights very different from their wanted posters that appear in the first chapter and had others look the same as their poster, but gave them "horrible" personalities. Although it was decided to make the protagonist of the series a "child", Suzuki struggled with designing Meliodas' profile because the character is actually an adult. He said the most difficult part was his hair; ultimately deciding on "fluffy" hair like a boy from a foreign country, which he had never done before. In the pilot chapter, the character had long, straight hair, which the author said was not as cute. Suzuki said he always made sure to show the subtly different relationships between the members of the titular group of knights. For example, he said that while Ban is Meliodas' best friend, King is only a teammate with whom he does not talk. All seven have such relationships, which the author called realistically human. Because he felt it would be too convenient to have seven enemies oppose the Seven Deadly Sins and fight them one-on-one, Suzuki decided on having ten with the Ten Commandments. This way, characters could fail and there would be another who can defeat many by themselves, making it unpredictable for readers. However, the author has stated that Escanor ended up being "too strong". Suzuki said that because the series is the story of Meliodas and Elizabeth, he planned for the manga to have a happy ending from the very beginning; "I didn't want to make it an ending that left people feeling uneasy. [...] I want to draw things that make people feel good when they read them."

Suzuki draws his manuscripts with pen and paper, stating that it does not feel like drawing manga without them. Although, he noted that the tones and Copic markers that he uses are being discontinued one after another. The manga artist also refuses to use assistants due to his contrary personality. He has done this since he began his career, when an editor told him he could not do it without one, and he wanted to prove him wrong. Suzuki said that drawing by himself allows him to take breaks to play games while working, and drink alcohol.

== Media ==
=== Manga ===
Written and illustrated by Nakaba Suzuki, The Seven Deadly Sins was serialized in Kodansha's Weekly Shōnen Magazine from October 10, 2012, to March 25, 2020. Kodansha collected its chapters into 41 individual tankōbon volumes, released from February 15, 2013, to May 15, 2020. Because he prefers physical books, Suzuki asked that the digital editions of the tankōbon be released one month after the print version. Suzuki created the three-chapter The Vampire of Edinburgh (Note: エジンバラの吸血鬼) manga that was included in limited editions of the anime adaptation's first three home video sets in 2015. A book compiling The Vampire of Edinburgh and A Dangerous Mission (Note: キケンなお使い) side stories, and the pilot one-shot was published on July 17, 2018, under the title The Seven Deadly Sins: Original Sins (Note: 七つの大罪 番外編集 ＜原罪＞). Suzuki mentioned that he had plans for additional side stories that would be published after the main series finished. Hajimari wo Sasou Ame no Mori (Note: 七つの大罪 はじまりを誘う雨の森), a one-shot following Ban's son, was published in Weekly Shōnen Magazine on August 5, 2020. In January 2021, Suzuki began Four Knights of the Apocalypse as a sequel to The Seven Deadly Sins.

In 2013, The Seven Deadly Sins was licensed for English language release in North America by Kodansha USA. They published the first volume on March 11, 2014, and the 41st and final volume on January 26, 2021. As the manga was serialized in Japan, it was released simultaneously in English digitally by Crunchyroll in over 170 countries. Kodansha USA published the Original Sins book on October 26, 2021, and began re-releasing The Seven Deadly Sins in an omnibus format that compiles three of the original volumes into one on February 1, 2022.

==== Spin-offs ====
A special issue of Weekly Shōnen Magazine, published on October 19, 2013, featured a small crossover between Suzuki's The Seven Deadly Sins and Hiro Mashima's Fairy Tail, where each artist drew a yonkoma (four-panel comic) of the other's series. An actual crossover chapter between the two ran in the magazine's combined 4/5 issue of 2014, which was released on December 25, 2013. Suzuki wrote the one-shot A Dangerous Mission for the November 2014 issue of the shōjo manga magazine Nakayoshi, released on October 3, 2014. He also created a comedic one-shot depicting how Meliodas and Hawk first met that ran in the October 20, 2014 issue of Magazine Special. From February 24 to May 10, 2015, two more spin-off manga by Nakaba were available on the smartphone and tablet application Manga Box. Naku na, Tomo yo (Note: 泣くな 友よ; "Do Not Cry, My Friend") is about Hendrickson and Dreyfus' younger years, while Gilthunder no Shinjitsu (Note: ギルサンダーの真実; "Gilthunder's Truth") is set after the Vaizel Fight Festival arc and follows Gilthunder. Suzuki created an original 40-page manga that was distributed during screenings of the Prisoners of the Sky film.

A comedic spin-off series by Juichi Yamaki, titled Mayoe! The Seven Deadly Sins Academy! (Note: 迷え！七つの大罪学園！, Mayoe! Nanatsu no Taizai Gakuen!) and imagining the characters as high school students, ran in Bessatsu Shōnen Magazine from August 9, 2014, to October 8, 2016. It was collected into four tankōbon volumes. The Seven Deadly Sins Production (Note: 七つの大罪プロダクション, Nanatsu no Taizai Purodakushon), a comedic spin-off by Chiemi Sakamoto that imagines the characters as actors performing in a live-action TV show, ran in Aria from November 28, 2015, to October 28, 2017. It was collected into four tankōbon volumes.

A comedic yonkoma titled The Seven Deadly Sins: King's Road to Manga (Note: 七つの大罪 キングの漫画道, Nanatsu no Taizai Kingu no Manga Michi) and written by Masataka Ono that depicts King as an aspiring manga artist, began on February 20, 2016, in Magazine Special before transferring to the Manga Box app on February 1, 2017, and ending later that year. Its chapters were collected into three tankōbon volumes. Yō Kokukuji's The Seven Deadly Sins: Seven Days ~The Thief and the Holy Girl~, a manga adaptation of Mamoru Iwasa's novel The Seven Deadly Sins: Seven Days, was serialized in Shōnen Magazine Edge from January 17 to September 2017 and shows how Ban and Elaine met in more detail.

=== Anime ===
In April 2014, the 20th issue of Weekly Shōnen Magazine announced that The Seven Deadly Sins was being adapted into an anime television series. The staff was revealed in the combined 36/37 issue of the year: created by A-1 Pictures, directed by Tensai Okamura, written by Shōtarō Suga, with Keigo Sasaki providing character designs, and Hiroyuki Sawano composing the music. The first series aired on MBS, TBS and other JNN stations for 24 episodes from October 5, 2014, to March 29, 2015.

A second series was confirmed on September 27, 2015, to air in 2016. This turned out to be a four-episode anime television special featuring an original story by Nakaba Suzuki, titled The Seven Deadly Sins: Signs of Holy War, that aired from August 28 to September 18, 2016, on MBS and TBS. The special was produced by A-1 Pictures, directed by Tomokazu Tokoro, and written by Yuniko Ayana and Yuichiro Kido, featuring character designs by Keigo Sasaki. The music was composed by Hiroyuki Sawano and Takafumi Wada.

A third season, titled The Seven Deadly Sins: Revival of The Commandments, was announced at the "Nanatsu no Taizai FES" event in July 2017 and aired for 24 episodes from January 13 to June 30, 2018. Jōji Furuta and Takao Yoshioka replaced Tensai Okamura and Shōtarō Suga as director and series composer, respectively, while the other main staff members returned to reprise their roles.

For the fourth season, the series switched studios; animated by Studio Deen with Susumu Nishizawa and Rintarō Ikeda as director and series composer, respectively. Hiroyuki Sawano, Kohta Yamamoto, and Takafumi Wada returned to reprise their roles as the music composers. Titled The Seven Deadly Sins: Imperial Wrath of The Gods, it aired for 24 episodes from October 9, 2019, to March 25, 2020, on TV Tokyo and BS TV Tokyo.

A fifth season, titled The Seven Deadly Sins: Dragon's Judgement, was slated to premiere in October 2020 on TV Tokyo and BS TV Tokyo. However, it was delayed to January 2021, due to the COVID-19 pandemic. A special program that celebrated the "charm" of the anime TV series was released on January 6, 2021, while the fourth season aired for 24 episodes from January 13 to June 23, 2021. The main staff and cast members, from the previous season, reprised their roles.

The Seven Deadly Sins was licensed for English streaming by Netflix in 2015 as its second exclusive anime, following their acquisition of Knights of Sidonia. All 24 episodes of the first season were released on November 1, 2015, in both subtitled or English dub formats. The Signs of Holy War arc was labeled as "Season 2" by Netflix and released on February 17, 2017. The streaming service released "Season 3" in English on October 15, 2018. The first half of "Season 5" was released on June 28, 2021, with the second half following on September 23, 2021. On February 14, 2017, Funimation announced that they acquired the first season for home video distribution for US and Canada. Part One of the first season was released on Blu-Ray on May 15, 2017, with Part Two being released on June 20 of the same year. A set containing the entirety of the first season was released on August 14, 2018. Madman Entertainment imported Funimation's release into Australia and New Zealand, with a release scheduled for January 2019.

==== Original video animation ====
An original video animation (OVA) focusing on Ban was included with the limited edition of volume 15 of the manga, released on June 17, 2015. A second OVA composed of nine humorous shorts was shipped with the limited edition of the sixteenth volume of the manga, released on August 12, 2015.

==== Films ====
An anime film, titled The Seven Deadly Sins the Movie: Prisoners of the Sky, premiered in Japanese theaters on August 18, 2018. Directed by Yasuto Nishikata, with Noriyuki Abe serving as chief director, it was written by Makoto Uezu and based on an original story by Nakaba Suzuki. The main staff members from the A-1 Pictures anime TV series returned to reprise their roles on the film.

A second anime film titled The Seven Deadly Sins: Cursed by Light premiered on July 2, 2021. Takayuki Hamana directed the film at Studio Deen, with Rintarō Ikeda writing the script.

A two-part anime film, titled The Seven Deadly Sins: Grudge of Edinburgh, was announced during Netflix's "Festival Japan" virtual event in November 2021. The film revolves around Meliodas' son, Tristan Liones. Bob Shirahata serves as director, with Noriyuki Abe as supervising director, and Rintarou Ikeda as scriptwriter. It is animated by Alfred Imageworks and Marvy Jack. The first part of the film was released on Netflix on December 20, 2022, with the second part set for an August 2023 release.

=== Light novels ===
Four light novels based on The Seven Deadly Sins have been published; The Seven Deadly Sins -Gaiden- The Seven Wishes of the Royal City from Old Times (Note: 七つの大罪 ―外伝― 昔日の王都 七つの願い, Nanatsu no Taizai -Gaiden- Sekijitsu no Ōto Nanatsu no Negai) by Shuka Matsuda on December 17, 2014; The Seven Deadly Sins: Seven Days by Mamoru Iwasa on December 26, 2014; The Seven Deadly Sins: Seven Scars They Left Behind (Note: 七つの大罪 ―外伝― 彼らが残した七つの傷跡, Nanatsu no Taizai -Gaiden- Karera ga Nokoshita Nanatsu no Kizuato) by Shuka Matsuda on October 16, 2015; and The Seven Deadly Sins: Seven-Colored Recollections (Note: 七つの大罪 ―外伝― 七色の追憶, Nanatsu no Taizai -Gaiden- Nanairo no Tsuioku) by Shuka Matsuda on October 17, 2016. Vertical released Seven Scars They Left Behind in North America in May 2017, with Seven-Colored Recollections following in March 2018.

=== Video games ===
A video game titled The Seven Deadly Sins: Unjust Sin (Note: 七つの大罪 真実の冤罪, Nanatsu no Taizai Shinjitsu no Enzai) was developed by Bandai Namco Entertainment and released for the Nintendo 3DS on February 11, 2015. A game titled The Seven Deadly Sins: Knights of Britannia (Note: 七つの大罪 ブリタニアの旅人, Nanatsu no Taizai: Buritania no Tabibito) was developed by Bandai Namco for the PlayStation 4. It was released in North America and Europe on February 9, 2018. A mobile game titled The Seven Deadly Sins: Grand Cross (Note: 七つの大罪 光と闇の交戦, Nanatsu no Taizai Hikari to Yami no Gurando Kurosu) was developed by Netmarble and released in Japan and Korea on June 4, 2019. On March 3, 2020, the game was released globally for Android and iOS. The series also became a part of the game The King of Fighters All Star as of March 30 in collaboration with Netmarble's franchise. In January 2022, Netmarble announced a free-to-play open-world game titled The Seven Deadly Sins: Origin. Originally scheduled for release on PlayStation 5, Steam, iOS and Android on January 28, 2026, it was postponed until March 16, 2026, so that changes could be made to the combat system and exploration based on feedback from the closed beta test held in November 2025.

=== Other media ===
An illustration collection titled Rainbow of Sin (Note: 七色の罪, Nanairo no Tsumi) and an official fan book were both released on February 17, 2015. A guidebook for the anime titled Ani-Sin (Note: アニ罪, Ani-Tsumi) was released on April 17, 2015, while a second fan book was published on August 17, 2016. Three character guidebooks each focusing on a different couple from The Seven Deadly Sins have been released; Meliodas and Elizabeth on October 17, 2016, Ban and Elaine on July 14, 2017, and King and Diane on November 16, 2018. A book where Suzuki discusses the completed series and its creation in depth was released on May 15, 2020, while a character directory profiling over 200 characters from the manga was published on May 17, 2021.

A stage play adaptation, The Seven Deadly Sins The Stage, was performed in August 2018. A second stage play, The Seven Deadly Sins Stage Play: The Treacherous Great Holy Knights (Note: 七つの大罪 The STAGE －裏切りの聖騎士長－, Nanatsu no Taizai The Stage -Uragiri no Seikishi-chō-) was announced to be performed in June 2020, but was cancelled due to the COVID-19 pandemic.

== Reception ==
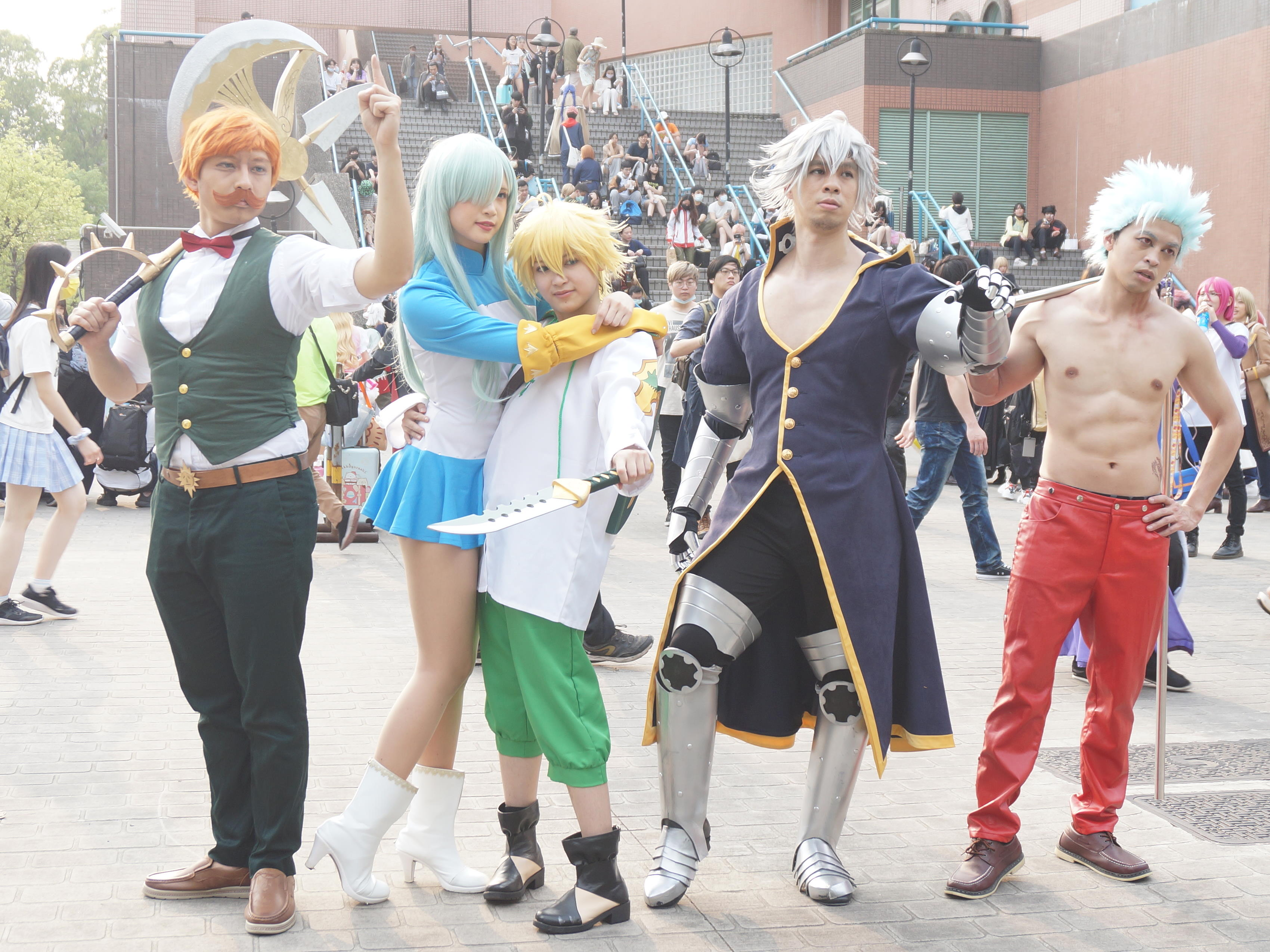
Fans cosplaying as characters from The Seven Deadly Sins at the 57th Taiwan Doujinshi Sales Conference in 2021. From left to right, Escanor, Elizabeth, Meliodas, Estarossa, and Ban, with Gowther in the background.

=== Manga ===
The Seven Deadly Sins won the shōnen category at the 39th Kodansha Manga Awards alongside Yowamushi Pedal. The 2014 edition of Takarajimasha's Kono Manga ga Sugoi! list, which surveys people in the manga and publishing industry, named The Seven Deadly Sins as the fifth best manga series for male readers. It was also nominated for the 2014 Manga Taishō award and as Best Youth Comic at the 42nd Angoulême International Comics Festival in France.

Jordan Richards of AIPT Comics called The Seven Deadly Sins a must read for fans of medieval fantasy and traditional shōnen action series. He felt the "unique" art helps set it apart from other series in the later category. However, he did note it was hard to tell exactly what happens in some moments. Rebecca Silverman of Anime News Network gave the first volume a B grade, calling the art interesting and the story a "neat take on the basic knights-in-shining-armor." She saw influence from Akira Toriyama in Meliodas and 1970s shōjo manga in the female characters. However, Silverman felt the art had issues with perspective and commented that Elizabeth lacked character development. Richards noted that Elizabeth's characterization improved in the second volume. He strongly praised the art, character designs and the panel layouts, particularly during action scenes; "Everyone looks so distinct and some of the shots are just phenomenal". In a review of volume three, Silverman wrote that because the main characters are already extremely powerful, Suzuki can forgo the typical training sequences seen in most shōnen manga and spend time exploring their relationships and adding plot. She suggests that this humanizing of superhuman characters makes the more human-looking villains stand out in their evil actions. Although noting he had said it more than once before, Richards found volume nine of the series to be the best so far, with strong characterization and growth, action and drama throughout, and one of the best double-page spreads he had ever seen in any series. Silverman felt that the plot of volume 14 comes off as darker when compared to the substantial changes made in its anime adaptation.

In a brief review, Jason Thompson claimed that the series follows common shōnen manga elements, making its plot twists and dialog predictable. He did however like the art and the series' European setting. Both Silverman and Danica Davidson of Otaku USA warned that Meliodas' perverted actions towards Elizabeth, which are used for comedic relief, could possibly be misinterpreted by some readers. Richards found the English translation's retaining of Japanese honorifics to be "kind of jarring", given the manga's heavy use of British and medieval themes and elements.

By August 2014, the collected volumes of The Seven Deadly Sins had 5 million copies in circulation. By January 2015, this number had grown to 10 million sold. By June 2018, the series had 28 million copies in circulation; over 37 million copies in circulation by March 2020; over 38 million copies in circulation by November 2022; and over 55 million copies by September 2023. The first collected volume of the series sold 38,581 copies in its first week, ranking thirteenth on the Oricon manga chart. Its second volume ranked fifth, having sold 106,829 in its first week; while its third debuted at fourth with 135,164 copies. The thirteenth volume had the manga's best debut week to date, selling 442,492 for first place on the chart. The series was the ninth best-selling manga of 2014, with over 4.6 million copies sold that year. For the first half of 2015, The Seven Deadly Sins was the best-selling manga series. It finished the year in second behind only One Piece, with over 10.3 million copies sold. It was the sixth best-selling manga of 2016, with over 5 million copies sold, and seventh in 2017, with close to 3.6 million copies sold. The novel The Seven Deadly Sins -Gaiden- Sekijitsu no Ōto Nanatsu no Negai was the 33rd best-selling light novel in the first half of 2015, with 61,939 copies sold. The North American releases of volumes two and four charted on The New York Times Manga Best Seller list at seventh and ninth, respectively.

=== Anime ===
Reviewing the first anime for Anime News Network, Theron Martin felt that the series has a slow start with typical action fare but the storytelling picks up significantly in the second half. He had strong praise for the music and enjoyed the main cast and their interactions, but not the common archetypal villains. Martin noted that the art has a "semi-cartoonish look" that one would expect in a series that "skews a bit younger," but The Seven Deadly Sins' graphic violence and minimal fan service prove it's "anything but a kiddie show." Martin largely compared Revival of The Commandments to the anime's first season and to Dragon Ball Z. He was positively surprised by the amount of character development within the main cast, but again found the arc's titular villains far less compelling, although he did note the powers they possess make for lively fights.

The first DVD volume of the anime debuted at first place on the Oricon's Japanese animation DVD chart with 3,574 copies sold. With 32,762 copies sold of the five volumes released at the time, The Seven Deadly Sins was the 30th best-selling animation in the first half of 2015. In their first weeks of release, the first and second DVD volumes of Signs of Holy War sold 1,194 and 1,004 copies for fourth and second place, respectively. In October 2017, Netflix revealed that The Seven Deadly Sins anime was the fourth most binge-watched show within its first 24 hours of release on their platform.
