= Meliodas (character) =

- The Seven Deadly Sins character
- Meliodas, as depicted in Four Knights of the Apocalypse
- First appearance: The Seven Deadly Sins chapter #1 The Seven Deadly Sins, February 15, 2013 (Weekly Shōnen Magazine)
- Created by: Nakaba Suzuki
- Based on: Meliodas
- Portrayed by: Takeru Naya (stage play)
- Voiced by: Japanese: Yuki Kaji; English: Bryce Papenbrook

In-universe information
- Aliases: Meliodafu; Dragon's Sin of Wrath

Meliodas (Japanese: メリオダス, Hepburn: Meriodasu) is a fictional character introduced as the protagonist of the 2012 Japanese fantasy manga series The Seven Deadly Sins, written and illustrated by Nakaba Suzuki. He leads the titular group, the Seven Deadly Sins, the strongest order of Holy Knights in the Liones Kingdom. Meliodas often maintains a calm facade. However, whenever his comrades are harmed, he expresses extreme rage. He returns in the series sequels and in multiple adaptations featuring him in new story arcs, most notably in TMS Entertainment and Telecom Animation Film's 2023 anime adaptation of the Four Knights of the Apocalypse manga series by Suzuki, as the King of the Liones Kingdom.

== Conception and creation ==
=== Design ===
Meliodas, as illustrated by Nakaba Suzuki

Nakaba Suzuki purposely made some of the Seven Deadly Sins' appearances different from their wanted posters that appeared in the first chapter and had others look the same. He had decided to give them "horrible" personalities. It was finalized to make the protagonist of the series a "child"; Suzuki also mentioned struggles with designing Meliodas' profile, as he was actually an adult. He felt that the most difficult part was Meliodas' "fluffy" hair. In the pilot chapter, Meliodas had long, straight hair, which Suzuki felt was not as "cute". He had also originally planned for Meliodas to have dot eyes, which he associated with strong characters, such as Ban, Tristan from his first serialized manga Rising Impact, and the titular character from his manga series Kongō Banchō (2007). He worried readers would not take him seriously as the main character, and decided to give him "shining eyes", which he felt were better because Meliodas was more of a "shōnen type" character.

=== Casting ===
In the original Japanese version of the The Seven Deadly Sins anime series, Yuki Kaji voiced Meliodas, while in the series' English dub, Bryce Papenbrook had voiced Meliodas. In an interview with Kalai Chik of Anime News Network, both Papenbrook and Kaji had agreed that Meliodas was an "interesting" yet "complicated" person. Kaji stated that Meliodas had tested his skills, and that "His looks and his personality are very different, which is a challenge to overcome". He had also expressed that "[I] have to switch on and off during comedic moments to more serious moments". While Papenbrook stated that he tries creates a character by looking at them, and becoming them "as much as possible".

== Reception ==
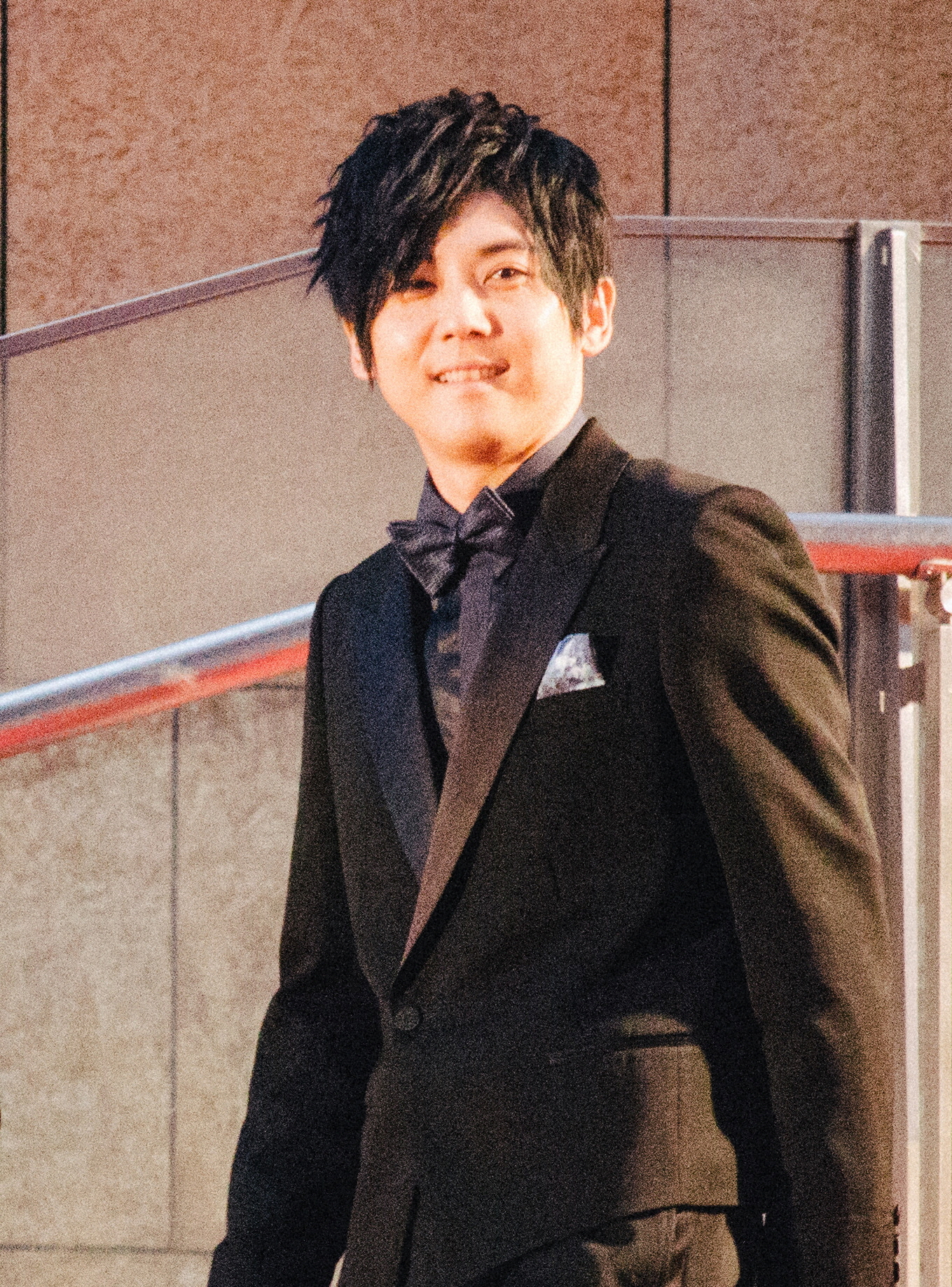
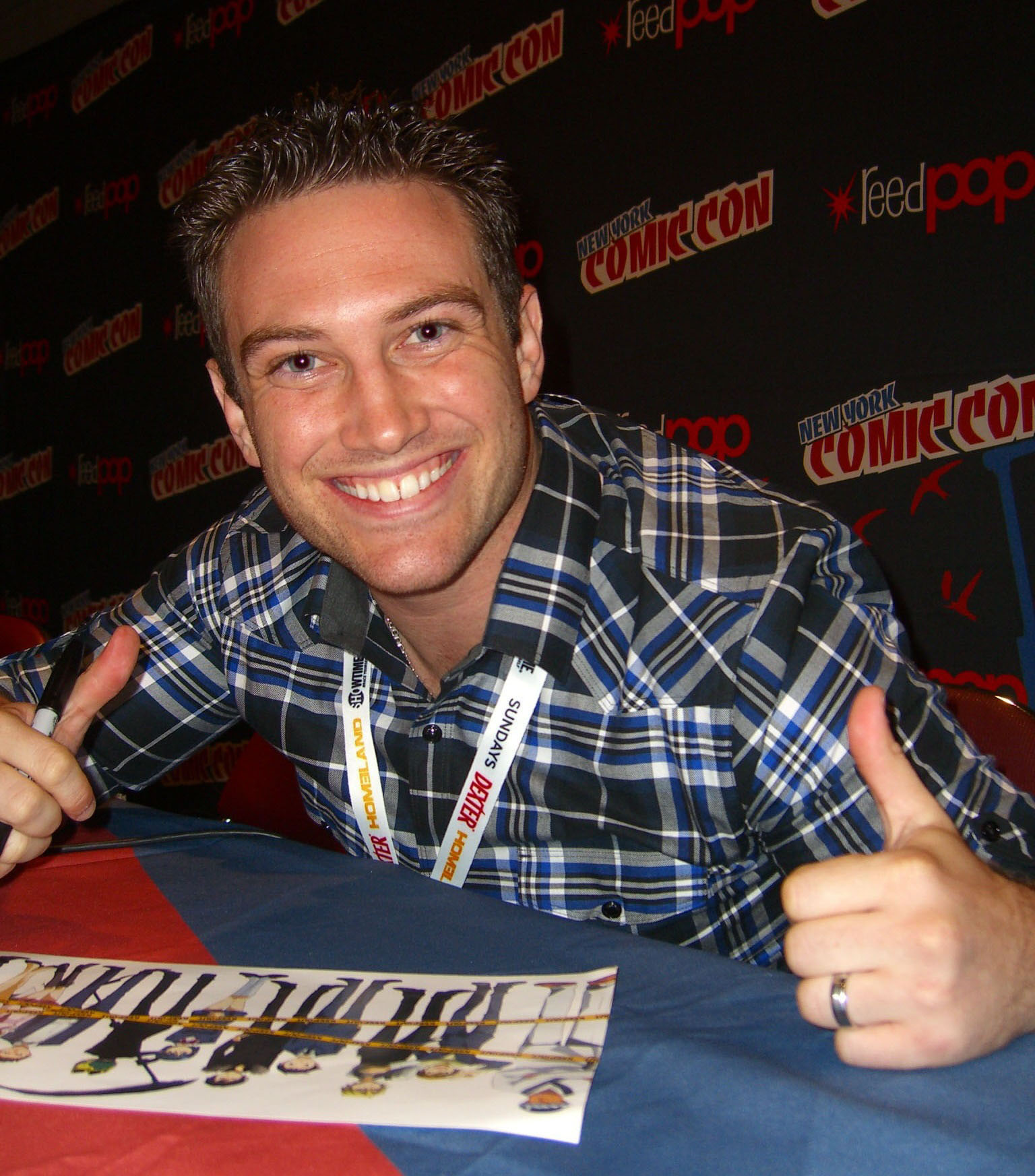
Yuki Kaji (left) and Bryce Papenbrook (right) voiced Meliodas in Japanese and English versions, respectively.

=== Popularity ===
Meliodas has been popular among the fans of the Seven Deadly Sins series. In a Seven Deadly Sins character popularity poll, taken in 2014, he was voted as the fifth most popular character in the franchise. While in a 2015 popularity poll, he ranked at fifth place with 6,554 votes, behind Hendrickson with 8,227 votes, and Gowther with 12,068 votes.

=== Critical response ===
Reception to Meliodas' characterization has been "generally mixed" or "negative". Reviewers often considered his attitude and behavior to be "pervy" and "creepy". Hannah Diffey of Screen Rant felt that his likeability was heavily diminished by his "treatment of females". Diffey had also felt that his flaws were "hard to ignore" and made the series an impossible watch for most viewers. Cultured Vultures' Chris Hansell said that Meliodas was the "biggest creep" in the Liones Kingdom. Perez Cody at Siliconera said that his strong personality had made him a "somewhat loveable" character. Nicolas Soto of But Why Tho noted that Meliodas' emotions were a "key" part of the fifth season, saying that they made his character much more "sympathetic". Both Anime News Network's Rebecca Silverman and Danica Davidson of Otaku USA warned viewers that the portrayal of Meliodas' perversion towards Elizabeth, often used for "comedic relief", may sometimes be misinterpreted by some readers. While Theron Martin felt that Bryce Papenbrook was "not fully effective in dropping his pitch" for voicing the "darker" side of Meliodas. In his review of the first season of the anime adaptation, Martin felt that the writing tried to make Meliodas come off as "perpetually calm, nonchalant, and difficult to truly anger". Both Silverman and Martin agreed that Bryce Papenbrook's voice acting was not as "effective" and was a little more "carefree".
