= List of The Seven Deadly Sins chapters =

The Seven Deadly Sins is a Japanese manga series written and illustrated by Nakaba Suzuki. It began its serialization in the manga anthology Weekly Shōnen Magazine on October 10, 2012. Its individual chapters have been collected into forty-one tankōbon volumes by Kodansha, the first released on February 15, 2013. The story begins with Elizabeth, the princess of Britannia, which has been overthrown by the brutal Holy Knights, finding Meliodas, the leader of the titular Seven Deadly Sins, a group of knights which was disbanded years ago after being blamed for plotting to overthrow Britannia. Convinced that the Sins are the only group of knights powerful enough to defeat the Holy Knights, Elizabeth joins Meliodas in his similar journey of finding the other members of his now-disbanded group.

The series is licensed for English language release in North America by Kodansha USA, who published the first volume on March 11, 2014. As the series is published in Japan, it is also released simultaneously in English digitally by Crunchyroll in over 170 countries.

== Volume list ==
No.	Original release date	Original ISBN	English release date	English ISBN
1	February 15, 2013	978-4-06-384802-1	March 25, 2014	978-1-61262-921-6
01. "The Seven Deadly Sins" (七つの大罪, Nanatsu no Taizai); 02. "The Holy Knight's Sword" (聖騎士の剣, Seikishi no Ken); 03. "What One Must Do" (自分がやるべきこと, Jibun ga Yarubeki koto); 04. "The Sin in the Sleeping Forest" (眠れる森の罪, Nemureru Mori no Tsumi); 05. "Dark Memories" (暗闇の記憶, Kurayami no Kioku)
After the Kingdom of Liones was taken over in a coup d'état by Holy Knights who once swore to protect it, princess Elizabeth Liones sought out a knight order that went into hiding a decade ago when the Holy Knights branded them as traitors: Seven Deadly Sins. Elizabeth encounters a tavern owner named Meliodas who is revealed to be Seven Deadly Sins' captain and the bearer of the Dragon's Sin of Wrath. Meliodas agrees to help Elizabeth alongside his talking pig Hawk as their business allowed him to gather information on his comrades' current location, attracting the attention of Holy Knight Gilthunder while saving Bernia Village from a drought the Holy Knight caused. Elizabeth and Meliodas reached the Forest of White Dreams where they found the giantess Diane, a Deadly Sins member who bears the Serpent's Sin of Envy.
2	April 17, 2013	978-4-06-384852-6	May 13, 2014	978-1-61262-923-0
06. "The Holy Knight Gilthunder" (聖騎士ギルサンダー, Seikishi Girusandā); 07. "Dark Prisoner" (暗闇の虜囚, Kurayami no Ryoshū); 08. "A Girl's Dream" (少女の夢, Shoujo no Yume); 09. "No Touching" (触れてはならない, Furete wa Naranai); 10. "An Unseen Malice" (見えざる悪意, Miezaru Akui); 11. "Even If You Died" (たとえあなたが死んでも, Tatoe Anata ga Shindemo); 12. "A Chaotic Party" (混沌の宴, Konton no Utage); 13. "Ready To Sacrifice" (捧げる覚悟, Sasageru Kakugo); 14. "Explosion" (エクスプロージョン, Ekusupurōjon)
Meliodas's reunion with Diane is cut short when they are ambushed by Gilthunder, whom Diane knocks away after Meliodas tricks him into revealing the location of their comrades Ban and King. The group decide to rescue Ban, the bearer of the Fox's Sin of Greed, from Baste Dungeon. But as Meliodas and Diane encounter the Holy Knights' Weird Fangs unit, Ban attempts escaping Baste Dungeon on his own after subduing the apprentice holy knight Jericho.
3	June 17, 2013	978-4-06-384884-7	July 8, 2014	978-1-61262-925-4
15. "Caught In the Reunion" (再会のとばっちり, Saikai no Tobacchiri); 16. "The Poem of Beginnings" (はじまりの詩, Hajimari no Uta); 17. "Storm's Brewing" (嵐の予感, Arashi no Yokan); 18. "A Touching Reunion" (感動の再会, Kandō no Saikai); 19. "The Sin of Greed" (強欲の罪, Gōyoku no Tsumi); 20. "Two Paths" (二つの道, Futatsu no Michi); 21. "Revenge Knight" (リベンジ • ナイト, Ribenji • Naito); 22. "A Pursuer to Fear" (恐るべき追跡者, Osorubeki Tsuiseki-sha); Bonus Chapter. "Nothing Wasted" (無駄なものなんて何一つ, Muda na Mono Nante Nani hitotsu)
After defeating the Weird Fangs, Meliodas and his group manage to rescue Ban and escape the collapsing Baste Dungeon. Ban, a bandit became immortal when the fairy Elaine used the Fountain of Youth to save his life when attempted to save her from a demon ravaging her forest home, joins the group in venturing to the Capital of the Death to retrieve King – the Deadly Sin member who bears the Grizzly's Sin of Sloth. King reveals himself as Elaine's older brother and blames Ban for his sister's death, petrifying Ban as the Holy Knight Guila attacks the others.
4	August 16, 2013	978-4-06-394918-6	September 9, 2014	978-1-61262-927-8
23. "Someday, I Swear" (いつか必ず, Itsuka kanarazu); 24. "The Pursued Legends" (追いつめられる伝説たち, Oitsumerareru Densetsu-tachi); 25. "Four-On-One, If It's All Right" (よろしければ四対一で, Yoroshikereba 4 Tai 1 de); 26. "Farewell to the Deceased" (死者たちとの別れ, Shisha-tachi to no Wakare); 27. "Cruel Rain" (無情の雨, Mujō no Ame); 28. "A Dangerous Man" (キケンなオトコ, Kiken na Otoko); 29. "Dark Pulse" (暗黒の脈動, Ankoku no Myakudō); Side Story. "Ban the Bandit" (バンデット・バン, Bandetto Ban)
Elaine's spirit, initially unseen by King, frees Ban from his petrified state to aid Meliodas and Diane in fighting. King eventually joins the fight as well and helps defeat the Holy Knight with his Spirit Spear Chastiefol, one of the Sacred Treasure weapons which allow the Deadly Sins to fight at their full potential. But Meliodas revealed to have sold his while Diane lost hers and Ban got his stolen, the group later learning Diane's War Hammer Gideon is prize to the winner of the Merchant Town Vaizel's annual fighting festival. Meanwhile, Jericho survives the ordeal of drinking a red demon's blood on Great Holy Knight Hendrickson's request to enhance her strength.
5	October 17, 2013	978-4-06-394947-6	November 11, 2014	978-1-61262-929-2
30. "Gather, You Festival Bastards!" (集まれ！お祭り野郎共 Atsumare!, Omatsuri yarō-domo); 31. "The Vaizel Fighting Festival" (バイゼル喧嘩祭り, Baizeru Kenka Matsuri); 32. "The Lineup of Strong Men" (強者そろいぶみ, Tsuwamono Soroibumi); 33. "Signs of a Great Chaos" (大荒れ模様, Ōare Moyō); 34. "Meliodaf vs. Bain" (メリオダフ対バーン, Meriodafu tai Bān); 35. "Robbed Meliodas" (奪われたメリオダス, Ubawareta Meriodasu); 36. "That Blinking Moment" (瞬きするその刹那 Mabataki, Suru Sono Setsuna); 37. "Approaching Chance Encounter" (近づく邂逅, Chikazuku Kaikō); Side Story. "Her Justice" (彼女の正義, Kanojo no Seigi)
The fighting festival commences an elimination round that results in eight contestants left standing, Diane shrinking herself to enter the contest under the alias "Matrona" as she eliminates Holy Knight Griamore in the quarterfinals. Holy Knight Howzer defeats the three-time champion Taizoo while an unarmed King is knocked out by the town drunk Cain Barzad. When Meliodas and Ban take stage for their match, the two are recognized as Deadly Sins members.
6	December 17, 2013	978-4-06-384802-1	January 13, 2015	978-1-61262-931-5
38. "Chance & Necessity" (偶然と必然, Gūzen to Hitsuzen); 39. "A Longstanding Grudge" (積年の思い, Sekinen no Omoi); 40. "Vaizel's Fighting Festival Finals" (バイゼル喧嘩祭り決勝戦, Baizeru Kenka Matsuri Kesshōsen); 41. "Hair-Raising Canon" (戦慄のカノン, Senritsu no Kanon); 42. "Demon Reactor" (デーモン・リアクター, Dēmon Riakutā); 43. "A Dangerous Bet" (危険な賭け, Kiken na Kake); 44. "Countdown to Despair" (絶望へのカウントダウン, Zetsubō e no Kauntodaun); 45. "Carnival of Atrocity" (暴虐のカーニバル, Bōgyaku no Kānibaru); 46. "Because We're Sisters" (姉妹だもんね, Shimai da mon ne)
After Meliodas beats Ban after their fierce fight, with Diane defeating Howzer in their match. After Cain forfeits when he explained that he never betrayed Liones, Meliodas faces Diane in the final round before Guila and Jericho arrive and attack Vaizel with group fighting them while Elizabeth encounters her older sister Veronica Liones who reveals Meliodas as a demon when trapping himself Goddess Amber. Elizabeth flees with Meliodas's sword and Goddess Amber while Griamore temporarily restrains Guila and Jericho. Veronica catches up to Elizabeth and dies shielding her from Guila's attack. When Elizabeth calls out for Meliodas, he emerges from within Goddess Amber with a darker side to him.
7	February 17, 2014	978-4-06-395013-7	March 17, 2015	978-1-61262-583-6
47. "Apostle of Destruction" (破壊の使徒, Hakai no Shito); 48. "Happy Annihilation" (めでたく全滅, Medetaku Zenmetsu); 49. "Unavoidable Retreat" (余儀なき敗走, Yoginaki Haisō); 50. "After the Festival" (祭りのあとの, Matsuri no Ato no); 51. "In the Depths of the Heart" (胸の奥, Mune no Oku); 52. "The Truth Behind the Rumors" (噂の真相, Uwasa no Shinsō); 53. "The Armor Giant vs. The Roars of Dawn" (鎧巨人 対 暁闇の咆哮 Āmā, Jaianto tai Dōn Roā); 54. "The Man Who Didn't Move" (動かなかった男, Ugokanakatta Otoko)
Meliodas displays his demonic power before being defeated Helbram as the Holy Knight claims. Ban takes Elizabeth, Hawk and King to safety, while Diane returns to her normal size and uses the earth-shaking power of Gideon to force the Holy Knights to withdraw and rescue Meliodas. Meliodas vows to end the Holy Knights' war once and for all, with the encounter the Holy Knights' Roars of Dawn unit while reunited with their comrade Gowther, who bares the Goat's Sin of Lust, who placed his armor on a mysterious figure the Roars of Dawn are after.
8	April 17, 2014	978-4-06-395054-0	May 12, 2015	978-1-61262-829-5
55. "That Man, and His Heartlessness" (その男、無情につき, Sono Otoko, Mujō Ni Tsuki); 56. "Unholy Knight" (アンホーリィ・ナイト, Anhōrii·Naito); 57. "The Scene of a Far-Off Day" (遠き日の風景, Tōki Hi No Fūkei); 58. "Assumed Readiness" (背負う覚悟, Seou Kakugo); 59. "The Unreadable Man" (読めない男 参入, Yomenai Otoko Sannyū); 60. "A Creeping Chaos" (にじみ出す混沌, Nijimidasu Konton); 61. "The Legends Get Stirred Up" (駆りたてられる伝説たち, Karitaterareru Densetsu-tachi); 62. "The Devil Won't Stop" (悪党は止まらない, Akutō Wa Tomaranai); Bonus Story. "Where He Belongs" (彼の居場所, Kare no Ibasho)
Gowther manages convince the Roars of Dawn to withdraw with the Armored Giant's head, revealing the armor was broken seal for a Holy Knight that mutated into a demon. At the same time, learning of Meliodas's former lover Liz from Cain, Elizabeth gives Liz's sword to Meliodas so he can kill the demon with the Holy Knight revealed to be Guila's father Dale who was used in Hendrickson's experiments. Gowther rejoins the Deadly Sins soon after with Meliodas revealing his sword hilt is part of a relief called the Coffin of Eternal Darkness which sealed the demons away. When Elizabeth is abducted by the Holy Knight Vivian, the Sins decide to storm the Liones capital to save her.
9	June 17, 2014	978-4-06-395107-3	July 28, 2015	978-1-61262-830-1
63. "Arthur Pendragon" (アーサー・ペンドラゴン, Āsā Pendoragon); 64. "Strategy To Invade The Kingdom" (王国侵入作戦！！, Ōkoku Shin'nyū Sakusen!!); 65. "Inescapable Collision" (回避しえぬ衝突, Kaihi Shienu Shōtotsu); 66. "First Sacrifice" (最初の犠牲, Saisho no Gisei); 67. "Crack" (亀裂, Kiretsu); 68. "Overwhelming Gap In Fighting Strength" (圧倒的戦力差, Attōteki Senryoku-sa); 69. "There's A First Time For Everything" (初体験は誰にでもある, Hatsu Taiken wa Dare ni demo aru); 70. "The Hellfire Captain of the Holy Knights" (業火の聖騎士長, Gōka no Seikishi-chō); 71. "What Lies In The Shadows" (闇に在るもの, Yami ni aru Mono)
As Elizabeth and Hawk are teleported by the Holy Knight Vivian to the dungeon of Liones castle, the Deadly Sins find their path to the castle impeded by an army of Holy Knights on the north side of the castle. But they receive aid from Camelot's young ruler Arthur Pendragon, who battles Hendrickson in a duel. As Diane joins the fray and is overpowered by Dreyfus, Howzer and Guila after realizing the Deadly Sins are not their enemy after witnessing the giantess save Guila's brother Zeal.
10	August 16, 2014	978-4-06-395162-2	September 8, 2015	978-1-61262-831-8
72. "The Man That Was Too Late" (遅すぎた男, Oso Sugita Otoko); 73. "If it Kills Me" (この命にかえても, Kono Inochi ni Kaete mo); Side Story. "The Fairy King Waits In Vain" (まちぼうけの妖精王, Machibōke no Yōsei-ō); 74. "Fulfilled Promise" (果たされる約束, Hatasareru Yakusoku); 75. "The Reason to be King" (王たる所似, Ō taru Yuen); 76. "The Princesses' Feelings" (王女たちの想い, Ōjo-tachi no Omoi); 77. "Feelings Toward Her" (あのコへの想い, Ano Ko e no Omoi); 78. "In Exchange For My Life" (命と引きかえに, Inochi To Hikikae Ni)
As Vivian captures Elizabeth after she and Hawks find her eldest sister Margaret Liones, Gowther faces Dreyus before being mortally wounded while Helbram attempts to kill Diane when King intervenes. Helbram reveals himself to be a fairy and King's former friend who Hendrickson resurrected, revealing King's past as Fairy King Harlequin in how his attempt to save Helbram and their kin from humans lead to his amnesia. Before regaining his memory, King met Diane and stayed by her side for centuries before his memory returns. King is forced to kill Helbram after learning his inaction turned his friend into a human-hating mass-murderer, punished with his sin brand and a millennia-long imprisonment. King erased Diane's memory of him to spare her the pain with the promise to see her again, killing Helbram once more while Meliodas comes to Arthur's aid against Hendrickson.
11	October 17, 2014	978-4-06-395219-3	November 17, 2015	978-1-63236-117-2
79. "Once More" (今一度, Ima Ichido); 80. "A Dramatic Surge of Reversal" (怒涛の逆転劇, Dotō no Gyakuten Geki); 81. "Meliodas' Strike" (メリオダスの一撃, Meriodasu no Ichigeki); 82. "The Incantation of Bravery" (勇気のまじない, Yūki no Majinai); 83. "Blazing Boar" (紅蓮の豚, Guren no Buta); 84. "The Matter is Settled" (一件落着, Ikken Rakuchaku); 85. "The Party Begins" (宴の始まり, Utage no Hajimari); 86. "The Threat Now Closing In" (今そこに迫る脅威, Ima soko ni Semaru Kyōi); Side Story. "Eternal Moment" (永遠の刹那, Eien no Setsuna)
Gilthunder battles Meliodas before Hendrickson joins him after ultimately defeating Arthur, Meliodas preventing Margaret from taking her own life by killing an invisible monster. This act allows Gilthunder to reveal his true colors and attack Hendrickson for murdering his father. Vivian attempts to trap Meliodas, Gilthunder, Margaret and Arthur in illusions before they are saved by the Deadly Sins' mage Merlin, the Boar's Sin of Gluttony. The group soon rescue Elizabeth and her father King Barta Liones with Merlin taking him and Arthur to Camelot before Hendrickson overpowers the group while revealing the Holy Knights he turned into demons are attacking the town, Elizabeth surrendering herself to Hendrickson to stop a bloodbath. Ban and Hawk soon arrives from the catacombs, the former having made contact with a goddess vessel through the Horn of Cernunnos with the promise of Elaine's resurrection on the condition of him killing Meliodas whom he deduced to be a Demon.
12	December 17, 2014	978-4-06-395265-0	January 26, 2016	978-1-63236-129-5
87. "Wrath & Greed" (<憤怒>と<強欲>, Funnu to Gōyoku); 88. "Hell on Earth" (この世の地獄, Kono Yo no Jigoku); 89. "Earnest Hope" (切なる願い, Setsunaru Negai); 90. "What I Can Do For You" (君のためにできること, Kimi no Tame ni Dekiru koto); 91. "A Loathsome Existence" (忌むべき存在, Imubeki Sonzai); 92. "The Final Decisive Battle Begins" (最終決戦開始, Saishū Kessen Kaishi); 93. "Red & Ashes" (赤と灰, Aka to Hai); 94. "The Advent of Despair" (絶望降臨, Zetsubō Kōrin); 95. "Defeated Hope" (潰える希望, Tsuieru Kibō); Bonus Story. "Partners" (相棒, Aibō)
After Meliodas convinces Ban to settle matters between them later, he has the other Sins help the Holy Knights fend off the attacking demons while he and Hawk find an injured Elizabeth as Hendrickson kills off Dreyfus. Meliodas is joined by his comrades as Hendrickson reveals to have derived his power from the red demon that ravaged the Fairy King's Forest long ago as he injects himself with blood from a grey demon to become a demon himself. Hawk sacrifices himself to save Meliodas and Elizabeth from Hendrickson's attacking, causing the latter's dormant powers to awake and heal everyone else.
13	February 17, 2015	978-4-06-362290-4	March 29, 2016	978-1-63236-216-2
96. "Hawk" (ホーク, Hōku); 97. "Elizabeth" (エリザベス, Erizabesu); 98. "Prayer" (祈り, Inori); 99. "Resolution" (決着, Kecchaku); 100. "The Heroes" (英雄たち, Eiyū-tachi); 101. "The Power of Love" (愛の力, Ai no Chikara); 102. "Premonition of Parting" (別れの予感, Wakare no Yokan); 103. "A New Journey" (新たなる旅立ち, Aratanaru Tabidachi); 104. "The Fairy King's Return" (妖精王の帰還, Yōsei-Ō no Kikan); Bonus Story. "A Completely Changed World" (一変する世界, Ippen suru Sekai)
The Seven Deadly Sins and the Holy Knights unite against Hendrickson with Meliodas defeating him, unaware that he escaped with the Coffin of Eternal Darkness. Soon after, Bartra gives the Holy Knights the task of restoring the kingdom as penance for their actions while rewarding the Seven Deadly Sins for saving the kingdom and protecting Elizabeth. Hawk is revived as a piglet to everyone's surprise. Soon after, Ban and King leave for the Fairy King Forest while Bartras tells the remaining Sins that foresaw ten shadows threatening Camelot. With Jericho following them, Ban and King reach the new Fairy King's Forest where the two get opposing welcomes by the fairy residents.
14	April 17, 2015	978-4-06-362295-9	May 10, 2016	978-1-63236-217-9
105. "The Nobody" (何者でもない, Nanimono demo nai); 106. "Barol's Evil Eye" (バロールの魔眼, Barōru no Magan); 107. "Seek the Truth" (真実を求めて, Shinjitsu o Motomete); 108. "Gentle Awakening" (優しい目覚め, Yasashii Mezame); 109. "Earthquake" (激震, Gekishin); 110. "Confession" (告白, Kokuhaku); 111. "The Man Has His Say" (男の言い分, Otoko no Iibun); 112. "Existence & Proof" (存在と証明, Sonzai to Shōmei); 113. "Revelation" (啓示, Keiji)
Revealed to have survived, Hendrickson and a demon possessing Dreyfus complete the ritual that summon back Demon race revived, with the latter joining the Ten Commandments, the Demon King's elite warriors in restoring their strength at the castle on Edinburgh Hill. Back in Liones, as Meliodas reveals the Ten Commandments' return to Merlin, Diane gets into a confrontation with Gowther when she and Elizabeth learn he was altering Guila's memories to experience love.
15	June 17, 2015	978-4-06-395418-0	July 12, 2016	978-1-63236-270-4
114. "The Lost Heroes" (とまどう英雄たち, Tomadō Eiyū-tachi); 115. "Nightmare Take Two" (悪夢ふたたび, Akumu Futatabi); 116. "The Sacred Treasure Lostvayne" (神器ロストヴェイン, Jingi Rosutovein); 117. "The Two Fairy Kings" (二人の妖精王, Futari no Yōsei-ō); 118. "Clash!! The Fairy King's Forest" (激突！！妖精王の森, Gekitotsu!! Yōsei-ō no Mori); 119. "The Ten Commandments on the Move" (十戒始動, Jikkai Shidō); 120. "Overwhelming Violence" (圧倒的暴力, Attō-teki Bōryoku); 121. "Unpredictable" (予測不能, Yosoku Funō); Bonus Story. "Harlequin & Helbram" (ハーレクインとヘルブラム, Hārekuin to Heruburamu)
After Gowther restores Guila and Zeal's memories before being temporary sealed by Merlin, she senses Camelot in danger and brings and teleports the group there to find it attacked by a demon-made Golem known as an Albion which Meliodas destroys when Merlin gives him back his Sacred Treasure sword Lostvayne. At the same time, winning back the fairies' admiration for him, King musters the strength to destroy an Albion attacking his homeland. After healing King and the forest with his blood, Ban takes his leave to find a means of reviving Elaine. Back in Camelot, Meliodas's group find themselves attacked and overpowered by the Ten Commandments member Galand of Truth whose power petrifies the deceptive Merlin before he slaughters mostly everyone and takes his leave. Meanwhile, the Ten Commandments decide to harvest human souls to speed up their recovery.
16	August 12, 2015	978-4-06-395458-6	September 6, 2016	978-1-63236-292-6
122. "The Demon Clan Advances" (魔神族の進攻, Majin-zoku no Shinkō); 123. "The Chief Holy Knight Atones For His Sins" (償いの聖騎士長, Tsugunai no Seikishi-chō); 124. "What the Friends Brought About" (友情がもたらしたもの, Yūjō ga Motarashita Mono); 125. "Down With The Ten Commandments!!" (打倒〈十戒〉, Datō "Jikkai"); 126. "Where the Memory Lead" (記憶が目指す場所, Kioku ga Mezasu Basho); Side Story. "Girls Have Impossible Dreams" (少女は叶わぬ夢を見る, Shōjo wa Kanawanu Yume o Miru); 127. "A Reunion With Despair" (絶望との再会, Zetsubō to no Saikai)
While in the middle of their investigation, Gilthunder and his group come across a village attacked by a Red Demon harvesting souls for the Ten Commandents. Though they destroy the demon with the souls restored to their bodies, the Holy Knights find themselves facing a Grey Demon that they manage to kill with Hendrickson's aid. Hendrickson soon reveals his actions were manipulated by a demon possessing Dreyfus named Fraudrin who is the true mastermind of Zaratras's death and one responsible for the destruction of the Danafall Kingdom. Back in Camelot, everyone but Merlin has been healed as Gowther revealed that he tampered with Galand's memory before a magic restraint bracelet is placed on him by Merlin, who transferred her soul into her Sacred Treasure crystal ball "Morning Star Aldan" at the last second. Meliodas resolves to find the Deadly Sin's final member Escanor, the lion Sins' Sin of Pride, as King arrives. The group soon learned that Gowther tampered with Diane's memories as she runs off to her village Megadoza.
17	October 16, 2015	978-4-06-395519-4	November 29, 2016	978-1-63236-293-3
128. "Their Presence, Outrageous" (その存在 傍若無人, Sono Sonzai Bōjakubujin); 129. "The Druids' Holy Land" (ドルイドの聖地, Doruido no Seichi); 130. "The Pain of Being Softly Pierced" (やさしく貫く その痛み, Yasashiku Tsuranuku Sono Itami); 131. "A Promise To A Loved One" (愛する者との約束, Ai suru Mono to no Yakusoku); 132. "What We Lacked" (僕たちに欠けたもの, Bokutachi ni Kaketa Mono); 133. "Impatience & Anxiety" (焦りと不安, Aseri to Fuan); 134. "To You, Who is No Longer Captain" (もう団長ではない君へ, Mō Danchō de wa nai Kimi e); 135. "A Little Greeting" (ほんの挨拶, Honno Aisatsu)
After Diane is saved from the Commandants by Matrona, Merlin advises Meliodas to travel to Istal so he can regain the power she took from him years ago. The group meet the twin druid apostles Jenna and Zaneri, the latter taking Meliodas and Elizabeth to the Tower of Trials where the former is forced to relive his time with Liz and her death in order to kill his emotions so his power would not destroy indiscriminately. Zaneri considers ending the test as the emotional strain will kill him if he can't control it, but Elizabeth stops her as Meliodas passes the trial through he his resolve of never letting anyone he cares like Liz to die. The rest of the group are taken to the Tower of Training by Jenna where they encounter Hendrickson and Gilthunder's group, with King confronting Hendrickson as the others enter. King later enters the cave with Meliodas, who intends to train his body before taking back his power. King uses this as an excuse to fight Meliodas for being a Demon while demanding whose side he is on before Jenna intervenes. Meliodas then regains his power and had Merlin send him to the Commandments, easily defeating Galand while provoking the group into scattering across Brittania to recover their strength.
18	December 17, 2015	978-4-06-395561-3	January 17, 2017	978-1-63236-348-0
136. "Spreading Fear" (散開する恐怖, Sankai suru Kyōfu); 137. "Between You & Me" (僕と君の間に, Boku to Kimi no Aida ni); 138. "A Fight with Darkness" (闇との戦い, Yami to no Tatakai); 139. "Tell me About the Past" (昔の話を聞かせて, Mukashi no Hanashi o Kikasete); 140. "The Thief & The Boy" (盗賊と少年, Tōzoku to Shōnen); 141. "Father & Son" (父親と息子, Chichioya to Musuko); 142. "Where Love is Found" (愛の在り処, Ai no Arika); 143. "The Saint's Shriek" (聖女の叫び, Seijo no Sakebi); 144. "That Man Walks the Way of Greed" (その男〈強欲〉につき, Sono Otoko 〈Gōyoku〉 ni Tsuki)
After the group completed their trials with the exception of Elizabeth, the group head out to find Escanor. Once the group, Zaneri confesses to Jenna that she sabotaged Elizabeth's training upon realizing she is Liz reincarnated and fears how Meliodas might react if she dies. Meanwhile, Ban's search for a means of reviving the dead brings him and Jericho to the city of Ravens where they meet an old werefox whose time is near. Ban recognizes the werefox as Zhivago, his father-figure who taught him the ways of banditry until the day he got caught attempting a burglary by himself. Zhivago was forced to abandon Ban to his fate to save his son Therion from hunters, arriving too late for his son while believing Ban also died. But Ban reveals his identity while bearing no ill will towards Zhivago, telling him everything that happened since with Zhivago using his last moments to urge Ban to reconcile with Meliodas. After burying Zhivago, Ban is reunited with Elaine as she among those brought back from the dead and corrupted to act on their regrets by the Commandment Melascula of Faith.
19	February 17, 2016	978-4-06-395602-3	March 7, 2017	978-1-63236-349-7
145. "Beautiful Soul" (美しき魂, Utsukushiki Tamashii); 146. "Farewell, Beloved Thief" (さらば愛しき盗賊, Saraba Itoshiki Tōzoku); 147. "The Chase of Death" (死の猛追, Shi no Mōtsui); 148. "Galland's Game" (ガラン・ゲーム, Garan Gēmu); 149. "Galland's Magic" (ガランの魔力, Garan no Maryoku); 150. "Master of the Sun" (太陽の主, Taiyō no Aruji); 151. "The Stage Awaits Us" (舞台がボクらを待っている, Butai ga Bokura o Matte Iru); 152. "Attracted by the Candle's Light" (燭光にさそわれて, Shokkō ni Sasowarete); 153. "A Bloodcurdling Confession" (戦慄の告白, Senritsu no Kokuhaku)
After reuniting with Ban, Elaine attempts to kill Jericho before she and Ban manage to get her to resist being controlled by Melascula. Melascula and Galand arrive soon after, with Zhivago's soul sacrificing himself to save Ban as he flees with Jericho and Elaine after destroying each Commandant's heart. The group take refuge in tavern built within a mountain owned by timid barkeep who recognizes Ban while overjoyed to learn the Sins have been pardoned. The barkeep hides the group into his pantry before Melascula and Galand arrive, being challenged by the latter to a game where they take turns killing each other with the consequence of running for either is being subjected to the demon's Commandment of Truth. Actually knocked out before awakening at dawn, the barkeep accepts the challenge while revealing himself to be the Deadly Sins' Escanor, the Lion's Sin of Pride. After forcing Galand to turn into stone and then incinerate Melascula when she attempted to eat his soul, Escanor returns after sunset and requests their help in delivering drinks to Vaizel as they are joined by King. Meanwhile, after being freed from the Pleiades of the Azure Sky's custody by his comrade Grayroad of Pacifism, Fraudrin reveals himself as a substitute for the missing Commandment member who ended up with the Deadly Sins: Gowther of Selflessness.
20	April 15, 2016	978-4-06-358807-1	May 9, 2017	978-1-63236-350-3
154. "The Demon Smiles" (悪魔は微笑む, Akuma wa Hohoemu); 155. "Death-Trap Maze" (死の罠の迷宮, Shi no Wana no Meikyū); 156. "The Maze Exploration Contest" (迷宮探索競技, Meikyū Tansaku Kyōgi); 157. "The Contenders That Dance a Frenzied Jig" (乱れ舞い踊る挑戦者たち, Midare Maiodoru Chōsenshatachi); 158. "The Brave Revelers" (狂宴の勇者たち, Kyōen no Yūsha-tachi); 159. "No Words Necessary" (言葉はいらない, Kotoba wa Iranai); 160. "Go!! Break Through" (ゴー！！ブレイクスルー, Gō!! Bureikusurū); 161. "Legendary Figures" (伝承の者共, Denshō no Monodomo); 162. "Who Will Share Their Fate?!" (運命の共闘者は誰だ！？, Unmei no Kyōtō-sha wa Dare da!?)
Diane learns that Matrona survived Gyannon's attempt on her life and has since lived with a barbarian named Zalpa and his children Sol and Della. But when Zalpa's children were attacked by a demon, Matrona decides to enter a fighting festival in Vaizel where the prize is any wish. Diane accompanies her before they got separated in a massive maze, rejoining her Deadly Sin comrades alongside Ban's group as they and other survivors find the tournament is being held by the Commandants Gloxinia of Repose and Drole of Patience: The founding rulers of the Fairy and Giant races.
21	June 15, 2016	978-4-06-358831-6	July 11, 2017	978-1-63236-442-5
163. "The Princess & The Saint" (王女と聖女, Ōjo to Seijo); 164. "Those Who Won't Be Offered Up" (譲らぬ者共, Yuzuranu Monodomo); 165. "Incompatible Lovers" (ちぐはぐラバーズ, Chiguhagu Rabāzu); 166. "What Sprouts There" (そこに芽吹くもの, Soko ni Mebuku Mono); 167. "The Special Thing Inside You" (キミの中の大切な, Kimi no Naka no Taisetsuna); 168. "Plan to Annihilate The Ten Commandments" (〈十戒〉殲滅作戦, <Jikkai> Senmetsu Sakusen); 169. "The Legendary Weakest Holy Knight" (伝説の最弱聖騎士, Densetsu no Saijaku Seikishi); 170. "For Whom Does That Light Shine?" (その光は誰が為に, Sono Hikari wa Daregatame ni); Bonus Story. "Naked Heart" (ハダカのココロ, Hadaka no Kokoro)
After Gloxinia killed off those who failed to make it to Vaizel in time, Drole randomly pairs everyone off in tag-team battles. Elizabeth and Elaine manage to defeat two assassin brothers who were killed off despite Elizabeth healing them out of kindness, while Meliodas and Ban killed their demons as an afterthought while arguing over which of their loves is the ideal woman. King and Diane face Gloxinia and Drole's golem representatives, the latter pair gaining a power boost after Gloxinia recognizes King as the current fairy king. King eventually exerts all his power to defeat Gloxinia's golem and then encourages Diane to use her feelings to create golems after him and their friends to obliterate Drole's golem. During the match between Gowther and Jericho against Hawk and Escanor, the others refuse to fight despite Gowther being the opposite as he intends to get a heart so he can feel emotions.
22	August 17, 2016	978-4-06-395729-7	September 19, 2017	978-1-63236-513-2
171. "The Time Has Come" (時は来たれり, Toki wa Kitareri); 172. "To You Who Were Once My Friends" (かつて友だった お前たちへ, Katsute Tomodatta Omaetachi e); 173. "The Darkness Comes Down" (闇は降り立つ, Yami wa Oritatsu); 174. "Meliodas vs. The Ten Commandments" (メリオダス vs．〈十戒〉, Meriodasu vs. <Jikkai>); 175. "To My Beloved Meliodas" (大好きなメリオダスへ, Daisukina Meriodasu e); 176. "The Darkness Speaks" (闇は語る, Yami wa Kataru); 177. "What I Can Do For You" (僕が君にしてあげられること, Boku ga Kimi ni shite Agerareru Koto); 178. "Britannia in Darkness" (暗黒のブリタニア, Ankoku no Buritania); 179. "Have Hope" (希望を求めて, Kibō o Motomete)
With Gowther's Nightmare Teller having an unintended effect, Escanor uses his brief moment in his daytime form to unleash a surprise attack on Gloxinia and Drole which Meliodas capitalizes as he battles the two while his comrades escape Drole's prison and return to Liones. But the battle attracts the other surviving Sins, including a still-burnt Melascula and Meliodas's brothers: Estarossa of Love and Zeldris of Piety. Meliodas is overpowered as Estarossa reveals him as the one who caused the Ancient War between the Demon and Goddess races. Though Ban manages to destroy a fully healed Melascula's five hearts to save Meliodas, he ultimately fails to prevent Estarossa from stabbing all seven of his captain's hearts. The Commandments soon resume their conquest of Britannia, with Ban leading Liones defense forces while Merlin secludes herself in her laboratory, Gowther currently imprisoned due to his past as a former Commandment, and King and Diane giving Matrona's family sanctuary in the Fairy King's Forest. Elizabeth runs the Boar Hat with Hawk as they save Golgius after his fellow Weird Fangs were sold out by the villagers.
23	October 17, 2016	978-4-06-395778-5	November 14, 2017	978-1-63236-514-9
180. "The Wandering Knight" (さまよえる騎士, Samayoeru Kishi); 181. "Chief Holy Knight Zaratras" (聖騎士長ザラトラス, Seikishi-chō Zaratorasu); 182. "Certain Warmth" (たしかなぬくもり, Tashikana Nukumori); 183. "Danger Zone" (デンジャーゾーン, Denjā Zōn); 184. "Mega Clash!!" (超激突！！, Chō-Gekitotsu!!); 185. "Pride vs. Love" (〈傲慢〉 vs．〈慈愛〉, <Gōman> vs. <Jiai>); 186. "Defensive War in Liones" (リオネス防衛戦, Rionesu Bōei-sen); 187. "Die, All You Wicked" (滅びよ邪悪な者共よ, Horobi yo Jaaku na Monodomo yo); 188. "Return Of The Sins" (〈罪〉の帰還, 〈Tsumi〉 no kikan)
After seeing Golguis off, Elizabeth and Hawk are visited by the knight they met at Gloxinia's Vaizel festival. The knight reveals himself as Grand Master Holy Knight Zaratras who was among those Melascula resurrected, using a druid spell so he, Elizabeth, and Hawk to see Meliodas' memories to see his history with Elizabeth since Danafall's destruction and the revelation that he was cursed with immorality. In Liones, the Commandments commence their invasion with Escanor battling Estarossa and managing to knock him and Zeldris away. But Ban's group are attacked by the Holy Knights who fell under the control of Zeldris's Commandment of Piety as Derieri and Monspeet arrive. Denzel sacrifices his life so his body can be used by the summoned Holy Soldier level Goddess Nerobasta, who a furious Derieri destroys after the apathic deity attempts to flee. Derieri and Monspeet then sense Elizabeth and Zaratras rush towards Liones, with Derieri attempting to kill Elizabeth upon recognizing her before she is stopped by a revived Meliodas.
24	December 16, 2016	978-4-06-395829-4	January 23, 2018	978-1-63236-566-8
189. "The Hero Rises!!" (英雄 立つ！！, Eiyū Tatsu!!); 190. "Demon Party" (魔宴, Maen); 191. "Insatiable Woman" (満たされぬ女, Mitasarenu Onna); 192. "Hendrickson vs. Fraudrin" (ヘンドリクセン vs．フラウドリン, Hendorikusen vs. Furaudorin); 193. "The Determined Chief Holy Knight" (覚悟の聖騎士長, Kakugo no Seikishi-chō); 194. "A Cruel Hope" (残酷なる希望, Zankokunaru Kibō); 195. "Liones's Defensive Battle Come to an End!" (リオネス防衛戦終結！, Rionesu Bōei-sen Shūketsu!); 196. "So Long As You're Here" (君がいるだけで, Kimi ga Iru Dake de); 197. "To Each His Own Answer" (それぞれの答え, Sorezore no Kotae); Extra Story. "A Deadly Sins Vacation" (大罪 Vacation, Taizai Vacation)
As Meliodas defeats Derieri and Monspeet, Ban's group inform Bartra of his brother's death before Fraudrin and Grayroad appear with the latter having Jericho and Guila's brother Zeal among other hostages she is turning into demons while Gilfrost reveals himself to be Vivian and teleports herself and Gilthunder away as she deems the situation hopeless. But Merlin intervenes with an immunity to Greyroad's Commandment of Pacifism, frightening the demons upon revealing herself as the daughter of Belialuin before sealing Grayroad in a test tube. Fraduin attempts to escape, only to face Hendrickson and Zaratras as the latter sacrifices himself to purge the demon from Dreyfus' body. Revealed in his true form, Fraudrin ends up fighting a stronger and cruel Meliodas before resolving to self-destruct with the intent of taking Liones with him. But he ceases his attack upon seeing Griamore, whom he grew to love while possessing Dreyfus, and allows Meliodas to kill him. Soon after the funerals, Merlin revealing that his curse causes him to slightly regress to his former self, Meliodas expresses how frightened he is as Elizabeth comforts him. The following day, after Merlin repaired the destroyed city while Gowther is released on probation, the Deadly Sins discuss dealing with Zeldris, Melascula, Drole, Gloxinia and Estarossa with Elizabeth adamant to remain by Meliodas's side.
25	March 17, 2017	978-4-06-362353-6	March 13, 2018	978-1-63236-567-5
198. "The Giant & the Fairy" (巨人と妖精, Kyojin to Yōsei); 199. "Those Without Light" (光なき者たち, Hikari Nakisha-tachi); 200. "Memories of the Holy War" (聖戦の記憶, Seisen no Kioku); 201. "Those Who Fight in Arms" (共闘する者たち, Kyōtō Suru Mono-tachi); 202. "Players in the Holy War" (聖戦の役者たち, Seisen no Yakusha-tachi); 203. "Ludoshel's Plan" (リュドシェルの計画, Ryudosheru no Keikaku); 204. "Let There Be Light" (光あれ, Hikari are); 205. "The Ten Commandments vs. The Archangels" (十戒 vs．四大天使, Jikkai vs. Yon Daitenshi); 206. "Wild Beasts Howl" (野獣 吼える, Yajū Hoeru)
As the other Sins continue to battle the demons coming from Camelot, unaware of their captain's return from the dead, Diane and King had turned the Fairy King's Forest into a haven for their races. But the two are eventually spirited away by Gloxinia and Drole, who offer to spare them on the condition of living their lives 3000 years ago to see if their decision to join the Ten Commandants was the right choice. Assuming the roles of the past versions of Drole and Gloxinia, Diane and King find themselves in the ancient war as Meliodas's comrades in Stigma, the coalition of the races fighting against the Demon Race in the Ancient War. Diane and King also meet a girl of the Goddess Race with the same name and face as Elizabeth, who wanted to resolve the conflict peaceful before it escalated when Ludociel of the Four Archangels slaughtered unarmed demons with Derieri's sister among them. This act enrages Derieri, whose left arm is severed by Archangel Sariel, forcing her and Monspeet to each sacrifice six of their hearts to transform into monstrous beasts called Inudra.
26	May 17, 2017	978-4-06-395948-2	May 1, 2018	978-1-63236-568-2
207. "Indura, Creature of Destruction" (破壊獣インデュラ, Hakai-jū Indeyura); 208. "Elizabeth vs. Indura" (エリザベス vs．インデュラ, Erizabesu vs. Indyura); 209. "Into the Future" (未来への前進, Mirai e no Zenshin); 210. "Emotional Maelstrom" (感情メイルシュトローム, Kanjō Meirushutorōmu); 211. "He Who Says Goodbye" (さよならを告げる人, Sayonara o Tsugeru Hito); Side Story. "The Doll Seeks Love" (人形は愛を乞う, Ningyō wa Ai o Kou); 212. "The Gift" (贈り物, Okurimono); 213. "We Call That Love" (それをボクらは愛と呼ぶ, Sore o Boku-ra wa Ai to Yobu); Bonus Story. "A Gentle Way to Break the Spell" (やさしい魔法の解きかた, Yasashii Mahō no Tokikata); Bonus Story. "What I Want to Tell You" (キミに伝えたいのは, Kimi ni Tsutaetai no wa); Bonus Story. "Hawk The Materialist" (〈物欲〉のホーク, Butsuyoku no Hōku)
Elizabeth purifies Derieri and Monspeet to their previous selves while Meliodas prevents Ludociel from interfering as the archangel decides to summon reinforcements by contacting Nerobasta, who was under Gowther's control as he and Melascula modified the portal to connect to the Demon World. King and Diane confront Gowther and unintentionally reveal themselves as they and Melasula learn that Gowther's modifications to the portal were to enable his creator, the original Gowther, to escape his imprisonment. The demon Gowther expresses his intent of ending the war itself, revealing that the humans under Rou have turned on the Fairies. King leaves to aid his kin while Diane reveals to the demon Gowther that his destined action would bring about a 3000-long peace, instilling the doll Gowther with a will of his own before completely restoring Diane's memories. King arrives to find an unconscious Gerharde and Rou, the latter revealed to have second thoughts over seeking revenge on Stigma to the point of protecting Gerharde when she was heavily wounded by his comrades.
27	July 14, 2017	978-4-06-510039-4	July 3, 2018	978-1-63236-628-3
214. "The Unreachable Past" (あの日の君にはもう届かない, Ano Hi no Kimi ni Hamou Todokanai); 215. "Zeldris The Executioner" (処刑人ゼルドリス, Shokei hito Zerudorisu); 216. "Deadly Sins, Unite!!" (いざ、大罪集結へ！！, Iza, Taizai Shūketsu e); 217. "Where the Heart is" (心の在り処, Kokoro no Arika); 218. "We Meet Again" (また会えたね, Mata Aeta ne); 219. "The Heroes Take a Break" (英雄たちの休息, Eiyū-tachi no Kyūsoku); 220. "The Heroes' Feast" (英雄たちの宴, Eiyū-tachi no Utage); 221. "It's All I Can Do" (はやる心, Hayaru Kokoro); 222. "The Cursed Lovers" (呪われし恋人たち, Norowareshi Koibito-tachi)
King ends up in the present after stopping himself from killing Rou at the last second, Gloxinia revealing that it was killing the human in his rage that caused him to turn his back on Stigma and join the demons. Only Diane remained in the past as she covers the Gowthers' escape when Zeldris arrives, rendered powerless while offered the chance to live as a member of the Ten Commandments. While Drole believed she make the same choice he did or die fighting, he is shocked that Diane returned to the present by simply running away from Zeldris. Gloxinia and Drole decide to defect from the Ten Commandments, protecting the Fairy King's Forest so Diane and King can return to Liones where they and the other Sin help Gowther overcome tragedy from his past. During the festivities, Merlin inflicted with a curse by Zeldris prior, Elizabeth learns of the goddess with her name and face with from Diane as Melodias refuses to talk about her or Liz. While tending to Merlin's fever, Elizabeth accidentally made contact with Zeldris who reveals her is the latest reincarnation of the goddess Elizabeth whose cursed existence only tortures Melodias. As the Sin later prepare to liberate Camelot while Ban knows that Melascula's death will break the spell keeping Elaine alive, Melodias grows concerned for Elizabeth as her past lives' memories begin to surface.
28	October 17, 2017	978-4-06-510242-8	September 25, 2018	978-1-63236-681-8
223. "The Lovers at a Loss" (とまどう恋人たち, Tomadō Koibito-tachi); 224. "The Life We Live" (それが僕らの生きる道, Sore ga Bokurano Ikiru Michi); 225. "Troubles Between Us" (それぞれの葛藤, Sorezore no Kattō); 226. "Untamed" (アラクレ, Arakure); 227. "The Hateful Cannot Rest" (怨念たちは眠らない, Onnen-tachi wa Nemuranai); 228. "The Goddess and the Saint" (女神と聖女, Megami to Seijo); 229. "Love is a Maiden's Power" (愛は乙女の力, Ai wa Otome no Chikara); 230. "Melascula's Miscalculation" (メラスキュラの誤算, Merasukyura no Gosan); 231. "Pride vs. Wrath" (〈傲慢〉vs.〈憤怒〉, "Gōman" vs."Fundo")
Meliodas reveals to the others that he and Elizabeth were cursed by the Demon King and Supreme Deity for their love, which in turn caused the Holy War: Meliodas was rendered immortal and forced to seek out a reincarnated Elizabeth, made human and doomed to die within three days of regaining her past life memories and be reborn anew. Meliodas explains Merlin and him made many failed attempts to break the curse and the events that lead to Liz's death and Danafor's destruction. The Sins proceed to the Coland ruins, which is the source of a dimensional warp that is preventing them from reaching Camelot. Meliodas falls into Melascula's Cocoon of Darkness, while the others face Coland's restless dead, which then possess Diane. When Gowther is unable to save Diane, Helbram reveals himself as the one who slaughtered Coland's residents and offers himself to give the spirits closure to pass on. Some of the wrathful spirits remain until Elizabeth arrives and purifies them to save Diane. This forces Melascula to fight the Sins as a giant serpent before Elizabeth purifies Melascula as well into her original form, a harmless snake that Merlin seals away. Meanwhile, Meliodas escaped the Cocoon of Darkness at the cost of his emotions, and stands against his comrades with hostility. Escanor engages in a fight with him.
29	December 15, 2017	978-4-06-510582-5	November 27, 2018	978-1-63236-682-5
232. "The Strongest vs. The Most Wicked" (最強 vs．最凶, Saikyō vs. Saikyō); 233. "Damage" (ダメージ, Damēji); 234. "The Door to the Unknown" (未知への扉, Michi e no Tobira); 235. "A New Threat" (新たなる脅威, Aratanaru Kyōi); 236. "Hopeless Rendezvous" (絶望ランデブー, Zetsubō Randebū); 237. "The Pacifier Demon" (おしゃぶりの鬼, Oshaburi no Oni); 238. "An Opening Presents Itself" (生まれた隙, Umareta Suki); 239. "To The Captain" (団長へ, Danchō e); 240. "Cornerstone to the Future" (未来への礎, Mirai e no Ishizue); Side Story. "The Cursed Engagement" (呪いの婚約, Noroi no kon'yaku)
Following Escanor defeating Meliodas in an epic battle, the Sins takes their unconscious leader to meet up with Arthur in Camelot. In Camelot, ordered by his father to retrieve Meliodas, Zeldris is unable to reach the other Commandments while Gloxinia and Drole use their communication channels to resign as the demons' comrades. Zeldris is soon joined by his mentor Cusack and as well as Melodias's mentor Chandler. Chandler offers to personally rescue Meliodas, whom he easily finds while proceeding to overwhelm the Seven Deadly Sins.
30	February 16, 2018	978-4-06-510966-3	January 8, 2019	978-1-63236-741-9
241. "Inherited Spirit" (受け継がれる魂, Uketsugareru Tamashii); 242. "The End of The Seven Deadly Sins" (<七つの大罪> 終結, "Nanatsu no Taizai" Shūketsu); 243. "And Then He Leaves on a Trip" (そして彼は旅に出る, Soshite Kare wa Tabi ni Deru); 244. "The Chosen Queen" (選ばれし王女, Erabareshi Ōjo); 245. "When The Saints Go Marching In" (聖者の行進, Seija no Kōshin); 246. "Chance Meeting" (邂逅, Kaikō); 247. "Collecting" (回収, Kaishū); 248. "Our Choice" (ボクたちの選択, Boku-tachi no Sentaku); 249. "Deal" (取引, Torihiki)
Despite Gloxinia and Drole sacrificing themselves to give the Sins time to escape, Chandler catches up to them as Meliodas finally awakens. Regaining his senses despite his lack of emotions, Melodias reveals he will find a way to break his and Elizabeth's curse, but disbands the Sins as he cannot work with them anymore. As Ban ventures into Purgatory to retrieve Meliodas' emotions since only he can survive its environment and not be ravaged by centuries of time, Meliodas reveals his intent of breaking the curses is becoming the new Demon King, winning over Zeldris with a proposition. Meanwhile, Princess Margaret's search for Gilthunder comes to an end by offering herself as the vessel for the Archangel Ludociel to inhabit so she can save her lover.
31	April 17, 2018	978-4-06-511205-2	March 5, 2019	978-1-63236-731-0
250. "Her Resolve" (王女の覚悟, Ōjo no Kakugo); 251. "The Holy War Accord" (聖戦協定, Seisen Kyōtei); 252. "An Old Grudge" (宿怨, Shukuen); 253. "Lost Grace" (失われし恩寵, Ushinawareshi Onchō); 254. "Camelot in Despair" (絶望のキャメロット, Zetsubō no Kyamerotto); 255. "Child of Hope" (希望の子, Kibō no Ko); 256. "The Piercing Sacred Sword" (貫く聖剣, Tsuranuku Seiken); 257. "Sallying Forth" (出撃の時, Shutsugeki no Toki); 258. "Dawn of the Holy War" (聖戦の幕開け, Seisen no Makuake)
Ludociel's intervention enables the Sins to evacuate most of Camelot citizens and rescue Elizabeth, who joins them to prevent Meliodas of becoming the new Demon King despite being doomed to die again. Once they reunite with the recently awaken Stigma archangels including their leader Ludociel in Margaret's body, Elizabeth acts as the Seven Deadly Sins' representative in forming a pact in order to protect Meliodas and the rest of their loved ones. While Ludociel confronts Escanor about possessing his power of his fallen brother Mael, Arthur uses Excalibur to fight the demons by himself and is overpowered by Cusack. Despite Merlin's attempt to save Arthur, he is killed by Cusack's enchantment. Soon after, Ludociel leads the Holy Knights to resume the Holy War in order to finish the demons once for all.
32	June 15, 2018	978-4-06-511616-6	May 14, 2019	978-1-63236-732-7
259. "War-Ravaged Britannia" (戦渦のブリタニア, Senka no Buritania); 260. "What I Want to Tell You" (キミに伝えたいこと, Kimi ni Tsutaetai Koto); 261. "Lost Cat" (迷子の猫, Maigo no Neko); 262. "The One Warped by Darkness" (闇に歪む者, Yami ni Yugamu Mono); 263. "Splitting Darkness" (闇爆ぜる, Yami Hazeru); 264. "A Warped, Twisted, and Broken Man" (歪み捻じれ壊れる男, Yugami Nejire Kowareru Otoko); 265. "Rampaging Love" (暴走する愛, Bōsō suru Ai); Bonus Story. "Sweet Dreams" (優しい夢, Yasashii Yume); 266. "The Pursuer and the Pursued" (追う者 追われる者, Ō Mono Owareru Mono); Side Story. "Fight!! Captain of the Knighthood of Scraps Disposal" (戦え！！残飯処理騎士団団長！！, Tatakae!! Zanpan Shori Kishi-dan Danchō!!); Side Story. "In Search of Panties" (パンツを求めて, Pantsu o Motomete); Side Story. "On the Subject of Reopening Boar Hat" (〈豚の帽子〉亭リニューアルにつきまして, Buta no Bōshi-tei Rinyūaru ni Tsukimashite)
The Holy War begins as King and Diane are supported by Elizabeth and Archangels to aid out the Holy Knights in the battlefield, Elizabeth managing to convince some of the less violent demons to withdraw while working to heal Deathpierce and the other Holy Knights who are too deluded by Ludociel's Breath of Bless to realize their injuries. Meanwhile, Monspeet and Derieri are revealed to have survived and are hiding out at a nearby village when they are confronted by Estarossa and learn his intent to take their Commandments for himself. Through Monspeet manages to restrain Estarossa while warning him of the danger of taking more than one Commandment for his lack of darkness, he sacrifices himself to send Derieri away while lamenting that he never to confess his love for her. Estarossa pursues Derieri to the battlefield to where Elizabeth, focusing on capturing her while being targeted by Sariel and Tarmiel for being Mael's killer. But the Commandments in Estarossa cause him to go berserk with Elizabeth leaving him to him to save her loved ones. The Holy Knights prepare for the next battle, while King leads a rescue team to go after Elizabeth.
33	August 17, 2018	978-4-06-512235-8	July 23, 2019	978-1-63236-797-6
267. "From the Skies" (天空より, Tenkū yori); 268. "From Purgatory" (煉獄より, Rengoku yori); 269. "Purgatory Life" (煉獄ライフ, Rengoku Raifu); 270. "A Meeting with the Unknown" (未知との遭遇, Michi to no Sōgū); 271. "A Single-Minded Love" (一途なる想い, Ichizu naru Omoi); 272. "Eternal Battle" (永劫する戦い, Eigō suru Tatakai); 273. "The Victims of the Holy War" (聖戦の犠牲者, Seisen no Giseisha); 274. "The Despairing Fallen Angel Mael" (絶望の堕天使マエル, Zetsubō no Datenshi Maeru); 275. "Together as One" (心を一つに, Kokoro o Hitotsu ni)
In Purgatory, Ban strives to keep himself from fully turning into a lost soul and ends up reuniting with Meliodas' emotions before they are joined in their search for the exit by Wild, Hawk's older brother who had constantly attacked the Demon King for stealing Hawk as a baby to unknowingly serve as his spy. While searching for the Demon King in hopes of reaching the exit, Meliodas reveals Zeldris's tragic past in being forced to execute the vampire Gelda along with her people for her father's attempted coup on the Demon race. But Meliodas realizes he cannot remember anything about Estarossa when the Demon King appear, overwhelming the group while revealing their memories of Estarossa are a fabrication that only the Commandant Gowther could pull off. King's group reaches Heaven's Theater to save Elizabeth from an unstable Estarossa, followed by Gowther as he observes the fight before Elizabeth's attempts to figure out the contradictions around Estarossa break the Commandant Gowther's spell with Estarossa revealed to be Mael.
34	November 16, 2018	978-4-06-512991-3	September 17, 2019	978-1-63236-872-0
276. "The Tragic Strike" (悲しき一撃, Kanashiki Ichigeki); 277. "There's No Way To Free Yourself From Love" (愛から自由になる術はない, Ai kara Jiyū ni naru Sube wa nai); 278. "Confront Despair!!" (絶望に立ち向かえ!!, Zetsubō ni Tachimukae!!); 279. "The Tolling of the Victory Bell" (勝利の鐘の音, Shōri no Kane no Ne); 280. "Collapse" (崩壊, Hōkai); 281. "The Fairy Kings vs. The Angel of Death" (妖精王vs.死の天使, Yōsei-ō vs. Shi no Tenshi); 282. "Gowther vs. Mael" (ゴウセルvs.マエル, Gouseru vs. Maeru); 283. "A Drive to Survive" (生還への渇望, Seikan e no Katsubō); 284. "The Doorway to Hope" (希望への扉, Kibō e no tobira); Bonus Story. "Showdown at High Noon" (真昼の決闘, Mahiru no Kettō)
Gowther reveals to a confused Mael that his creator used a forbidden spell to end the Holy War 3,000 years ago by altering the memories of Mael and those who knew him. While Gowther offered his life as penitence for his role in the spell, Mael decides to punish him instead by killing his friends. In the battle that follows, Mael kills Derieri for her Commandment before destroying Sariel and a conflicted Tarmiel. Gowther joins the fight to protect his friends while joined by Diane as Mael assumes a new form. After Oslo sacrifices himself to protect the group, King awakens his full powers as fairy king to defeat Mael as the absorbed Commandments begin destroying his body. Gowther manages to save Mael while revealing the reason the Archangel was selected by creator, Mael purging the Commandments from his body. Back in Purgatory, after sixty years of fighting the Demon King, Ban developed a healing ability called Gift that he uses against the Demon King's The Ruler ability to reverse attack effects. In the battle that ensures, Wild seemingly sacrificed himself to enable Ban and Meliodas to return their world. As Meliodas returns to his body while awakening a new power when the Demon King attempts to grab him, Ban informs King's group to head for Camelot while he uses Gift to fully resurrect Elaine at the cost of his immortality.
35	January 17, 2019	978-4-06-513877-9	November 19, 2019	978-1-63236-873-7
285. "What Lies Ahead" (その先に在るもの, Sono saki ni aru mono); 286. "Flash" (閃光, Senkō); 287. "The Prince of Darkness" (暗黒の王子, Ankoku no Ōji); 288. ""Ominous Nebula"" (凶星雲(オミノス・ネビュラ), Ominusu Nebyura); 289. "Pride vs. Piety" (〈傲慢〉vs.〈敬神〉, <Gōman> vs. <Keishin>); 290. "Clever Little Grubs" (小賢しき蛆虫たち, Kozakashiki Ujimushi-tachi); 291. "The Witch's Feast" (魔女の晩餐, Majō no Bansan); 292. "The Stuff of Nightmares, The Return of Hope" (悪夢の顕現 希望の帰還, Akumu no Kengen Kibō no Kikan); 293. "When "Someday" Comes True" (「いつか」が叶う時, "Itsuka" ga Kanau Toki)
During the battle against Estrossa/Mael, Estarossa, Merlin, Escanor, Ludociel, Gilthunder and Hendrickson infiltrate Camelot castle where their way to Meloidas is blocked by Zeldris, Cusack, and Chandler. Revealed to be supporting Meliodas as he promised to release his beloved Gelda as she was resealed after the other Vampires were killed by the Seven Deadly Sins, Zeldris overpowers the group with his true power Ominous Nebula, which combined with the Demon King's blessing make him a difficult opponent. Even after Zeldris increased the attack's pull with Gilthunder wounded in protecting Margaret's body from the demon's attack, Escanor is unaffected as he assumes The One state to turn the tide in his group's favor before Chandler recognizes Escanor's power as Mael's Grace and nullifies it. While victory seem assured for Ludociel's group when Chandler and Cusack are effected by the Double Impact that Merlin placed on them prior, the cancelation of the Commandment Gowther's spell causes Ludociel to collapse in pain while Zeldris is unaffected. Chandler and Cusack decide to finish the group while revealing their true nature as two halves of the Demon King's right hand who was sundered for an attempted rebellion, merging back into their original self.
36	April 17, 2019	978-4-06-514884-6	January 21, 2020	978-1-63236-874-4
294. "Hope, Conflict, and Despair" (希望と葛藤と絶望, Kibō to Kattō to Zetsubō); 295. "That Which Gathers" (集結するものたち, Shūketsu suru Mono-tachi); 296. "As a Friend, As a Brother" (友として 兄として, Tomo toshite Ani Toshite); 297. "The Salvation of the Sun" (太陽の救済, Taiyō no Kyūsai); 298. "Mael vs. Zeldris" (マエルvs.ゼルドリス, Maeru vs. Zerudorisu); 299. "Everyone Freezes" (すべてが凍り付く, Subete ga Kooritsuku); 300. "The Demon Lord Meliodas" (魔神王メリオダス, Majin-Ō Meriodasu); 301. "The One Who Stands Against A God" (神と対時する人, Kami to taiji suru hito); 302. "Everyone's Waiting for You" (みんながキミを待っている, Minna ga Kimi o Matte iru); Extra Story. "Little Sisters" (妹よ, Ane yo)
Chandler and Cusack merge back into the all-powerful Original Demon, overpowering Escanor despite Merlin's aid as they gain support from King sending Chastiefol ahead of his group to hold off Zeldris. But matters worsen when the Commandments instinctively converge into Meliodas's cocoon, with Merlin seeing their only chance of preventing Meliodas's transformation by casting Chrono Coffin on the cocoon. A despondent Ludociel, purged from Margret's body by Hendrickson in his moment of weakness, is convinced into aiding the Sins after Escanor is knocked away from the fight. Escanor is rescued by King's group, realizing he reached his limit with Sunshine and convinces a conflicted Mael to take it back and help the others. Mael defeats the Original Demon and joins the Sins in holding Zeldris off long enough for Merlin to complete the spell. While the spell is successfully cast, Hawk notices a hole in a cocoon as the group are confronted by an adult-like Meliodas. The figure is revealed to be the Demon King, explaining that the "succession" with the Commandants is actually a means for him to acquire a younger body for his soul to inhabit. The Demon King proceeds to attack the Sins with the intend to permanently kill Elizabeth when Ban arrives, who is able to overpower the Demon King since his time in Purgatory made his body stronger and more resilient.
37	June 17, 2019	978-4-06-515676-6	March 24, 2020	978-1-63236-921-5
303. "We'll All Be Your Strength" (みんながキミの力になる, Minna ga Kimi no Chikara ni Naru); 304. "The Executioner's Wish" (処刑人は願う, Shokeinin wa Negau); 305. "Death Throes" (断末魔, Danmatsuma); 306. "The End of a Long Journey" (永き旅の終着, Nagaki Tabi no Shūchaku); 307. "Until We're Shrouded in Happiness" (幸せに包まれる時, Shiawase ni tsutsuma reru toki); 308. "Meliodas Disappears" (メリオダスが消える, Meriodasu ga Kieru); 309. "This is the Path I Live" (れが私の生きる道, Rega watashi no ikiru michi); 310. "Farewell, Seven Deadly Sins" (さょなら セつの大罪, Sayonara Nanatsu no Taizai); 311. "It's Not Over Yet" (まだ終わらない, Mada Owaranai)
Ban faces the Demon Lord while Meliodas fights his influence inside his body, getting help from the other Seven Sins. Mael, Ludoshel and even Zeldris aid Ban during the battle. With the encouragement from his friends and Elizabeth, Meliodas manages to rid his body of the Demon Lord's influence, ending the Holy War. The demons retreat from Liones and Ludoshiel dies. Using his newfound strength, Meliodas dispels both his and Elizabeth curses. Meliodas later reveals he has actually become the new Demon Lord and must return to the Demon World. Travelling to Edinburg, Meliodas frees Gelda to help him find Zeldris. Elizabeth decides to live with Meliodas in the Demon Realm, however, her curse is revealed to still be active, leading the Seven Sins to realize the Demon King is still alive. Somewhere else, it is revealed Chandler and Cusack survived and took Zeldris, as well as the Ten Commandments. After killing Chandler, Cusack resurrected the Demon Lord in Zeldris' body.
38	September 17, 2019	978-4-06-516231-6	July 21, 2020	978-1-63236-922-2
312. "Outbreak of War" (開戦, Kaisen); 313. "Fated Brothers" (宿命の兄弟, Shukumei no Kyōdai); 314. "Their Demon Lord" (二人の魔神王, Futari no Majin-Ō); 315. "The Final Battle" (最終戦争, Saishū Sensō); 316. "The Lord's Grace Indura" (主恩のインデュラ, Shuon no Indura); 317. "Proud Determination" (傲慢なる決意, Gōman naru Ketsui); 318. "Ambiguous Fight" (混迷の戦況, Konmei no Senkyō); 319. "Unforgivable Deadlock" (許されざる膠着, Yurusarezaru Kōchaku); 320. "Brothers of Despair" (絶望の兄弟, Zetsubō no Kyōdai)
Meliodas and Elizabeth face the Demon Lord, while the other Sins fight an Indura released by the Demon Lord. Escanor nearly dies protecting Griamore and Gilthunder from an Indura spawn, before being rescued by Mael. Despite knowing his body won't resist using Sunshine again, Escanor still convinces Mael to lend him his grace again. After defeating the Indura, Ban, Merlin, Diane, King and Gowther arrive to help Meliodas.
39	November 15, 2019	978-4-06-517356-5	September 8, 2020	978-1-64651-003-0
321. "The Light" (光, Hikari); 322. "The Voice Calling Your Name" (キミの名を呼ぶ声, Kimi no Na o Yobu Koe); 323. "I'm Right Here" (ボクはここにいる, Boku wa Koko ni Iru); 324. "A Promise Between Brothers" (兄弟の約束, Kyōdai no Yakusoku); 325. "The Challengers" (抗う者たち, Aragau Mono-tachi); 326. "The Seven Deadly Sins vs. The Demon Lord" (＜七つの大罪＞vs.魔神王, "Nanatsu no Taizai" vs. Majin-Ō); 327. "The Man Called Escanor" (エスカノールという男, Esukanōru to iu Otoko); Side Story. "The King Sings Alone" (王は孤独に歌う, Ō wa Kodoku ni Utau); 328. ""The One: Ultimate"" (天上天下唯我独尊の極み, Za Wan Arutimetto)
Meliodas enters Zeldris mind to free him and Gelda reappears to assist him. With Escanor arriving, the Seven Deadly Sins regroup to face the Demon Lord. Escanor decides to sacrifice his life to hold the Demon Lord.
40	February 17, 2020	978-4-06-518271-0	November 17, 2020	978-1-64651-065-8
329. "Zeldris vs. The Demon Lord" (ゼルドリスvs.魔神王, Zerudorisu vs. Majin-Ō); 330. "The Struggle" (あがき, Agaki); 331. "Mortal Enemies" (倶に天を戴かず, Tomo ni Ten o Itadakazu); 332. "The Price" (代償, Daishō); 333. "Arrogance, Overeating, and Scars" (傲慢と暴食と傷跡, Gōman to Bōshoku to Kizuato); 334. "The End of an Era" (一つの時代の終わり, Hitotsu no Jidai no Owari); 335. "What the Witch Had Always Wanted" (魔女が求めつづけたもの, Majo ga Motometsuzuketa Mono); 336. "The Lord of Chaos" (混沌の王, Konton no Ō); 337. "Merlin" (マーリン, Mārin)
Zeldris is freed from the Demon Lord's influence, but he takes over the land itself to create a new body. The Seven Deadly Sins combine their powers into a single attack – Nemesis, that finally destroys the Demon Lord. Zeldris and Meliodas reconcile. Due to all the strain, Escanor's body crumbles, and Merlin kisses him before he passes, burning her lips to remember him. Following the celebrations, Merlin revives Arthur as the King of Chaos, revealing this was her plan all along. The Lady of the Lake reveals herself and explains Chaos is the creator of the world and all races, and that Merlin revived it hoping to feel fulfilled.
41	May 15, 2020	978-4-06-518685-5	January 26, 2021	978-1-64651-066-5
338. "Birth" (誕生, Tanjō); 339. "A Taste of Chaos" (混沌の一端, Konton no Ittan); 340. "I Miss You" (あなたに会いたくて, Anata ni Aitakute); 341. "Cath Palug" (キャス・パリーグ, Kyasu Parīgu); 342. "Victory Cry" (勝利の雄叫び, Shōri no Otakebi); 343. "An Everlasting Kingdom" (永遠の王国, Eien no Ōkoku); 344. "Towards the Future" (未来へ, Mirai e); 345. "Heirs" (継がれゆくもの, Tsugareyuku Mono); 346. "Like That Sky" (あの空のように, Ano Sora no Yō ni)
Hawk's mother is revealed to be the previous vessel of Chaos before deflating. Cath, Arthur's pet companion, appears and attempts to kill him, revealing itself as Cath Palug, a monster who attempted to consume Chaos and was sealed by the goddesses. Arthur kills him and passes out, prompting Merlin to escape with him. Meliodas, Elizabeth, Ban, King, Diane and Gowther decide to help Merlin after Cath returns, vowing to protect her in exchange for her pleading her life to guiding Arthur. After defeating Cath, the Sins part ways. Hawk visits the Purgatory and meets his brother. Several years later, Meliodas and Elizabeth's son, Tristan, vows to become one of the Seven Deadly Sins.

== Spin-offs ==
=== Mayoe! The Seven Deadly Sins Academy! ===
Mayoe! The Seven Deadly Sins Academy! (迷え！七つの大罪学園！, Mayoe! Nanatsu no Taizai Gakuen!) is a comedic spin-off of the series by Juichi Yamaki that re-imagines the titular Seven Deadly Sins as high school students. It was serialized in Bessatsu Shōnen Magazine from its September issue on August 9, 2014, to its November issue on October 8, 2016, and collected into four tankōbon volumes between February 17, 2015, and December 16, 2016.

No.	Release date	ISBN
1	February 17, 2015	978-4-06-395322-0
2	August 12, 2015	978-4-06-395459-3
3	April 15, 2016	978-4-06-395651-1
4	December 16, 2016	978-4-06-395808-9

=== The Seven Deadly Sins Production ===
The Seven Deadly Sins Production (七つの大罪プロダクション, Nanatsu no Taizai Purodakushon) is a comedic spin-off by Chiemi Sakamoto that imagines the series' characters as actors performing in a live-action television show. It began in the January 2016 issue of Aria on November 28, 2015, and ended on October 28, 2017, with the chapters collected into four tankōbon volumes between December 16, 2016, and November 17, 2017.

No.	Release date	ISBN
1	June 17, 2016	978-4-06-377472-6
2	December 16, 2016	978-4-06-393102-0
3	June 16, 2016	978-4-06-393210-2
4	November 17, 2017	978-4-06-510495-8

=== The Seven Deadly Sins: King's Road to Manga ===
The Seven Deadly Sins: King's Road to Manga (七つの大罪 キングの漫画道, Nanatsu no Taizai Kingu no Manga Michi) is a comedic yonkoma written by Masataka Ono, that depicts King as an aspiring manga artist. It began on February 20, 2016, in Magazine Special, before being transferred to the smartphone and tablet application Manga Box on February 1, 2017, and ending later that year. Its chapters were collected into three tankōbon volumes between August 17, 2016, and July 14, 2017.

No.	Release date	ISBN
1	August 17, 2016	978-4-06-395730-3
2	March 17, 2017	978-4-06-395901-7
3	July 14, 2017	978-4-06-510040-0

=== The Seven Deadly Sins: Seven Days ===
The Seven Deadly Sins: Seven Days ~The Thief and the Holy Girl~ (七つの大罪 セブンデイズ～盗賊と聖少女～, Nanatsu no Taizai: Sebun Deizu ~Tōzoku to Seishōjo~) is a manga illustrated by Yō Kokukuji that adapts Mamoru Iwasa's novel Seven Days, showing how Ban and Elaine met in more detail. It was serialized in Shōnen Magazine Edge from the February 2017 issue released on January 17 to its October 2017 issue that was released in September. Its chapters were collected into two tankōbon volumes between July 14 and October 17, 2017.

No.	Release date	ISBN
1	July 14, 2017	978-4-06-393201-0
2	October 17, 2017	978-4-06-393292-8

=== The Vampires of Edinburgh ===
No.	Japanese release date	Japanese ISBN
1	August 17, 2016 (Official Fanbook: Sinful Testament)	978-4-06-393043-6
01. "The Lion's Sin of Pride"; 02. "The Vampires vs. The Seven Deadly Sins"; 03. "Escanor! The Pride! The Sin!"
12 years ago, the messenger from Liones' neighboring kingdom, Edinburgh, was actually a vampire!! The entire population of Edinburgh was either massacred or turned into vampires, and vampires took over its capital. After a meeting between Great Holy Knight Zaratras, Dreyfus, Hendrickson, and Meliodas, an order was issued to the knights of the Seven Deadly Sins to capture Edinburgh. A mission given when Meliodas and others were still the knight order of the Seven Deadly Sins. A tale of the battle with the vampires in the castle of Edinburgh. The vampires have captured the neighboring of Edinburgh and have declared on the Kingdom of Liones as well. In response, Liones sends the Seven Deadly Sins!! Thus begins the fierce battle between the vampire army and the great criminals. Escanor's true nature finally comes to the surface. His fearsome power that even Meliodas hesitates to utilize is now made clear! The Goat's Sin of Lust, Gowther's role, the Fox's Sin of Greed, Ban's push-ups, the Boar's Sin of Gluttony, Merlin's independent actions, the Serpent's Sin of Envy, Diane's struggle in battle, the Grizzly's Sin of Sloth, King's anguish, and the Dragon's Sin of Wrath, Meliodas' sorrow are all captured in these pages.
