= Jiandu =

Jiandu is an atonal pinyin romanization of various Chinese names and words.

It may refer to:

- Jiandu (建都), a former name of Xichang in Sichuan
- Jiandu (简牍), bamboo and wooden slips used for writing in East Asia
- Kantoku (カントク, 監督) (born 1985), Japanese illustrator and character designer, his name means director
