= List of Haganai episodes =

Haganai (はがない), short for Boku wa Tomodachi ga Sukunai (僕は友達が少ない; literally "I Don't Have Many Friends"), is an anime television series produced by AIC Build based on the light novel series by Yomi Hirasaka. It follows a group of misfits who have trouble making friends and form the Neighbors Club with the goal of making friends. There are a total of 26 anime episodes, 24 being televised, and 1 OVA preceding each season.

An OVA episode was bundled with the seventh light novel volume on September 22, 2011. The anime television series aired on TBS and MBS between October 7 and December 23, 2011, and was also simulcast on Niconico. Another OVA episode was released on September 26, 2012. The opening theme is "The Regrettable Neighbours Club Two and a Half Stars" (残念系隣人部★★☆, Zannenkei Rinjinbu Hoshi Futatsuhan) by Marina Inoue, Kanae Itō, Nozomi Yamamoto, Misato Fukuen, Kana Hanazawa, and Yuka Iguchi, while the ending theme is "My Feelings" (私のキ・モ・チ, Watashi no Ki-mo-chi) by Marina Inoue. For the OVA, the ending theme is "You Are My Friend" (君は友達, Kimi wa Tomodachi) by Inoue, Itō, Yamamoto, Fukuen, Hanazawa, Iguchi and Ryohei Kimura. Funimation Entertainment has licensed the series in North America.

A second season, Haganai NEXT, aired between January 11 and March 29, 2013. The opening and ending themes respectively are "Be My Friend" and "Bokura no Tsubasa" (僕らの翼; "Our Wings"), both performed by Inoue, Itō, Yamamoto, Fukuen, Hanazawa and Iguchi.

== Episode list ==
=== Haganai (2011) ===
The broadcast for the TV series was aired after midnight, so October 6, 2011 premiere on 25:50 on TBS actually occurred on October 7, 2011, at 01:50. The English titles listed for the TV series parts are from the Funimation and Hulu listings.

No. overall	No. in season	Title	Original release date
OVA1	0	"Black Hotpot Gives Girls a Bad Smell"; Transliteration: "Yaminabe wa Bishōjo ga Zannen na Nioi" (Japanese: 闇鍋は美少女が残念な臭い)	September 22, 2011
Kodaka Hasegawa appears to be having an enjoyable time at the beach with lots of female friends. However, this all turns out to be the hallucinagenic dream that occurred as a result of trying a mysterious "black nabe".
1	1	"We Can't Make Friends"; Transliteration: "Boku-tachi wa Tomodachi ga Dekinai" (Japanese: 僕達は友達が出来ない)	October 7, 2011
Kodaka Hasegawa, a recent transfer student to St. Chronica's Academy, has trouble making friends due to his scary appearance. He remembers the negative impression he made when he arrived late on his first day. However, one day when Kodaka went to get his gym uniform, he encounters his classmate, Yozora Mikazuki, talking to an imaginary friend named Tomo. Kodaka finds it strange since Yozora is usually depressed and walks in, exposing her secret. As they both talk about their troubles in making friends, Kodaka gives Yozora the idea about creating a club. The next day, Yozora drags Kodaka over to her newly created club called the Neighbors Club, dedicated to help people make friends. Kodaka is skeptical of the club's objectives but joins Yozora in posting recruitment posters. As they conclude their activities, another student named Sena Kashiwazaki comes to join. Yozora shuts the door on her, labeling her as the "perfect girl", but Sena forces herself in wanting friends. Yozora questions Sena's popularity with the boys, but Sena replies that they are only her doormats and she wants true friends. As Yozora and Sena argue through the afternoon, Kodaka makes note of the club's statistics.
2	2	"There's No God in the Electric World"; Transliteration: "Dennō Sekai wa Kamisama ga Inai" (Japanese: 電脳世界は神様が居ない)	October 14, 2011
Yozora decides that the first Neighbors Club activity is to play an action role-playing game dealing with hunting monsters to improve their friendship. Yozora looked around and found a group of friends playing together, thinking it was a way to make friends. At the next meeting, all three members bring their copies in. Sena shows off her rank, making Yozora angry as she checks her playtime. The conditions do not improve in the game when Yozora and Sena attack each other during the game. Yozora and Sena constantly get in each other's way, leading all three of them to fail the mission. The next day, Sena sets up a TV and game console in the clubroom to play a gal game, which she claims is much better than a game about hunting monsters. As Sena plays through the game, Sena and Yozora choose the most negative response towards Akari, a pink-haired character, leaving Kodaka in question. As the game goes on, the negative responses affect Sena's progress with Yukiko, a blonde-haired character, leading to a sad ending for Sena. However, the next day, Sena shows a change of heart towards Akari when she completes all pathways in the game. She hands the game over to Kodaka, demanding that he play and learn from the girls.
3	3	"There Are No Flags at the Pool"; Transliteration: "Shimin Pūru wa Furagu ga Nai" (Japanese: 市民プールはフラグがない)	October 21, 2011
Sena is caught playing an eroge and insists it is not perverted. While trying to praise the story of the game, Yozora has Sena read the dialogue aloud to prove otherwise. Sena reads a few lines, but panics and breaks down, running out of the clubroom crying. Later that night, Kodaka's little sister, Kobato Hasegawa, feels jealous that Kodaka is spending more time with the Neighbors Club than with her. Kodaka thinks about Kobato's words the next day while watching Sena play another game. She encounters Natsume, a green-haired character wearing a bathing suit, in her game and asks Kodaka to teach her how to swim, having not learned before. Kodaka accepts and gives her swimming lessons at a water park. As Kodaka and Sena eat lunch, he finds it strange that Sena likes her nickname "Meat". Sena then gets herself into trouble when she insults some guys hitting on her, forcing Kodaka to help her out. Although Sena thanks Kodaka for saving her, Kodaka blames Sena for starting the argument. On the way home, Sena thinks about having a male confront her for the first time. The incident also reminds Kodaka of a friend he once had as a child, who taught him a lesson about friendship, something which Yozora finds familiar.
4	4	"Underclassmen Don't Know How to Hold Back"; Transliteration: "Kōhai-tachi wa Enryo ga Nai" (Japanese: 後輩達は遠慮がない)	October 28, 2011
Kodaka meets ten-year-old teacher Maria Takayama, who was tricked by Yozora into becoming the club's faculty adviser. Maria tries to reclaim her room and refuse being a faculty adviser, but Yozora tricks Maria again by noting that adults can handle the job. Maria accepts and Yozora welcomes Maria as a full club member. Later, Kodaka tells Yozora and Sena about his sense of being stalked. Yozora and Sena try to help, but only lower Kodaka's reputation. Kodaka later catches the stalker, an effeminate boy named Yukimura Kusunoki, who sees Kodaka as a role model and notes that everyone sees him as a girl. Yozora lets Yukimura join the club for him to study about Kodaka and become manly, so Yukimura accepts and starts serving Kodaka. The next day, Kodaka saves a scientist named Rika Shiguma after she collapses in a chemistry lab. She finds Kodaka shortly afterwards and wants to repay him somewhat promiscuously. Rika joins the Neighbors Club, where it is revealed that she is also fascinated with dirty magazines particularly involving mecha, much to Yozora's dissatisfaction.
5	5	"Now SAGA is Locked in Full-On Battle"; Transliteration: "Kondo wa SAGA ga Gachi na Tatakai" (Japanese: 今度はSAGAがガチな戦い)	November 4, 2011
On noticing that Maria eat nothing but chips, Kodaka decides to start making healthy lunches for her. Kobato feel jealous because it appears that Kodaka is prioritizing Maria over her. As Kodaka gives Maria lunch, he learns that Yozora awards Maria with chips whenever she does something for her. Maria, satisfied after eating Kodaka's lunch, starts calling Kodaka her "big brother". Later, Sena completes another dating sim and wishes that she could be inside a game. Rika brings out a virtual reality game console and has everyone try out a beta release of a role-playing game. As they pick their character class, they have mixed feelings about their assigned costumes and abilities. Everything goes well in the beginning as they gain abilities and level up. However, the boss stage does not go well, because Maria falls asleep and goes offline. Yozora tricks Sena so that she is defeated, while Sena tickles Yozora in revenge. After the game ends in defeat, Kodaka is surprised to find that Kobato was playing Maria's character. She had come to the clubroom to see him because she was feeling too detached from her brother. She immediately clashes with Maria, and Yozora decides to accept Kobato as a member. Later that night, Kobato sneaks into Kodaka's bed, stating that she is Kodaka's only sister.
6	6	"The Karaoke Box Has Few Customers"; Transliteration: "Karaoke Bokkusu wa Kyaku ga Sukunai" (Japanese: カラオケボックスは客が少ない)	November 11, 2011
Kodaka wakes up with Kobato in his bed after a dream about his childhood friend, who he did not get to say goodbye to before he moved. At the Neighbors Club, the members reflect on their progress of making friends so far. Kodaka and Sena believe their reputation has dropped since attending the club. As they continue to discuss activities they engaged in after joining the club, Sena asks if the other members ever been to a karaoke box. Although Kodaka has been to one before, Yozora shares her past experience of going to numerous karaoke boxes citywide, making the other members interested in going to a karaoke box. Sena initially declines and calls this an unsophisticated activity, but after Yozora starts making plans for the others, Sena pleadingly agrees to join in. At the lobby of the karaoke box, Yozora argues with the clerk over the pricing system as she feels they have been cheated. After the negotiations, Yozora and Sena choose to rent separate rooms, while Kodaka and the others share one. After the karaoke, Kodaka and the others, exhausted from singing, find Sena and Yozora already in the lobby. Apparently, the two found a way to compete in karaoke through the scoring mode. As they walk home, Sena tells Kodaka that her father is interested in meeting him, making Yozora feel jealous.
7	7	"My Cell Phone Has Few Phone Calls"; Transliteration: "Keitai Denwa wa Chakushin ga Sukunai" (Japanese: 携帯電話は着信が少ない)	November 18, 2011
As summer rolls in, Kodaka asks Yukimura to provide Maria with her lunches in his place though Yukimura misinterprets what qualifies as "healthy food", leading to Yukimura overdosing Maria with dietary supplements. Kodaka later realizing that the club members do not always show up on a regular basis in the summer, suggests finding another way to keep in contact. With message boards and social networking services quickly rejected, Rika suggests the idea of using their cellphones. Rika and Yukimura quickly exchange contact information through infrared wireless, while Yozora and Kodaka manually enter the contact information, having been almost completely unaware of their cellphones' capabilities. When Kodaka asks Sena for her contact information, Sena reveals that she neither has a cellphone nor needs one. Yozora teases Sena by making a call in front of her with "meat" jokes, making Sena angry. Later, Sena calls Kodaka in the middle of the night, asking for the make and model of his cellphone. The next day, after Kodaka reads numerous perverted text messages from Rika, Sena arrives in the afternoon with a new cellphone identical to Kodaka's cellphone. Yozora spams Sena's cellphone and becomes jealous when Sena comes to Kodaka for help.
8	8	"No School Swimsuits this Time"; Transliteration: "Sukūru Mizugi wa Deban ga Nai" (Japanese: スクール水着は出番がない)	November 25, 2011
With the air conditioner in Kodaka's house broken, Kobato takes inspiration from an episode of her favorite vampiric anime and wears normal clothes suited to the weather. She accompanies Kodaka to the clubroom, where she clashes with Maria after Maria calls Kodaka her "big brother" again, leading Kobato to bite Maria out of anger. Believing that she has been possessed by a vampire, Yozora tells her to run naked in the sun in which she does, only to be disciplined. Afterwards, Kobato gets showered with attention by Sena, who wants to try to befriend her. After losing to another gal game, in which a shark eats up Mizuki, the brunette main character, Sena tells everyone she wants to go to the pool yet unintentionally reveals that she once went with Kodaka alone. Kodaka quickly covers up by inviting the entire club to go to the pool. On the way to the pool, the club members find it overcrowded with people due to a half-price offer. The crowd proves to be too much for Yozora and Rika, who decide to head home early. Kodaka, upon hearing the news, chases after them, only to see them leaving in the shuttle bus. He turns around to face the rest of the club, who all decide to leave for home.
9	9	"The Board Chairman's Memories are Painful"; Transliteration: "Rijichō wa Tsuisō ga Setsunai" (Japanese: 理事長は追想が切ない)	December 2, 2011
Yozora messages everyone to dress in swimsuits for the day's club activities. As the members arrive, they find Yozora dressed up in a swimsuit with a horse mask. After playing around with the horse mask, Yozora explains that she wanted to make use of her swimsuit while avoiding crowds. Sena offers Yozora her private beach house as a way to alleviate the concern of crowds. Labeling it as a "training camp", the club accepts. The next day, Sena calls Kodaka and asks Kobato and him to come to her house and meet her father Pegasus Kashiwazaki and butler Stella Redfield. Kodaka and Kobato arrive just in time for dinner. During dinner, Pegasus talks bad about Hayato Hasegawa, Kodaka's father, but Kodaka tries to tell Pegasus otherwise. Next, Kodaka and Kobato are offered rooms for the night as the last bus for home has already left. While Sena takes Kobato for a bath, Pegasus offers Kodaka a drink. Pegasus talks about having drinks with Hayato in the past and gets drunk, falling asleep on Kodaka's bed. Kodaka looks for help but bumps into a naked Kobato running away from a naked Sena, who notices Kodaka and runs out of the house. The next day, Kodaka lies that he was too drunk to recall the events of the previous evening.
10	10	"No One Sleeps at Training Camp"; Transliteration: "Gasshuku wa Minna ga Nenai" (Japanese: 合宿は皆が寝ない)	December 9, 2011
The Neighbors Club goes to Sena's beach house and immediately hits the beach. After a failed attempt at making a beach call, the Neighbors Club all put on sunscreen. As Kodaka puts sunscreen on Kobato, both Maria and Yukimura also request help from Kodaka. Rika's fantasies of Yukimura putting sunscreen on Kodaka make her pass out. Sena, requesting help from Yozora, is instead pinned to the ground, while Yozora rubs her foot onto Sena with sunscreen. After Yozora continuously makes insulting comments, Sena pushes Yozora off and accidentally exposes herself, causing her to flee. As the sun sets, Kodaka finds Sena on the porch and comforts her, again lying when he says that did not see her naked. After playing on the beach the next day, Kodaka prepares dinner using ingredients he bought at a local market and hears Yozora's depressing life in home economics class. The club members then realize that they have not done much training and decide to end the trip by listening to scary stories, which turn out to be comedic rather than tragic. However, Yozora's story about a haunted school scares everyone to the point where Kodaka is called several times during the night to escort the girls, including Yozora herself, to the bathroom. Yozora explains that she cannot scare someone unless she find it scary herself.
11	11	"You See, Girls Wearing Yukata Are Extremely Cute"; Transliteration: "Joshi wa Yukata Sugata ga na, Chō Kawaii" (Japanese: 女子は浴衣姿がな、超可愛い)	December 16, 2011
Although Yozora brings up the upcoming summer festival, she but declines to attend due to crowds. Rika also demurs due to her past experience with a summer festival. (Note: The summer festival that Rika is referring to is actually Summer Comiket, shown in Oreimo. During the flashes of the festival shown, you can see Kyosuke Kosaka, Kirino Kosaka, Ruri "Kuroneko" Gokō and Saori Makishima, from right to left, walking towards the event from behind.) When Sena mentions takoyaki, the entire club decides to go for the purpose of getting takoyaki, which Kodaka is passionate about. As they walk to the festival, Kodaka and Kobato change into yukatas at Sena's request. Yozora declines to change into a yukata, disappointing Kodaka. After changing, Sena finds Kobato attractive, but also decides that Kodaka's hair ruins his appearance and wants him to dye it. Kodaka replies that he cannot dye his hair color since it is a legacy of his deceased mother, impressing Sena. After having their fill of food, Yozora and Sena compete with each other at the games stalls while the other members enjoy the other stalls on their own. Later, everyone gets together to set off fireworks. After the last one is set off, Yozora's hair catches on fire, forcing Kodaka to throw a bucket of water on her to put it out. Soaked and humiliated, Yozora leaves and stays away from the club for the last week of summer vacation. On the first day of school back from vacation, Yozora arrives in class with her hair cut short. The change in appearance leads Kodaka to finally recognize her as his childhood friend, nicknamed Sora.
12	12	"We Have Few Friends"; Transliteration: "Boku-tachi wa Tomodachi ga Sukunai" (Japanese: 僕達は友達が少ない)	December 23, 2011
Yozora recalls how she recognized Kodaka as her childhood friend, nicknamed Taka, the moment he transferred to the school, though she was disappointed when he did not recognize her. She was talking to her imaginary friend Tomo about the problem when Kodaka walked in on her after his first day at the school. It was during their conversation about clubs that Yozora got an idea to form a club just for Kodaka and her, which is now the Neighbors Club. Back in the present, Yozora pulls Kodaka to the stairwell and reveals that she was his childhood friend all along, much to his surprise since he assumed his childhood friend was a boy. Yozora blames Kodaka for disappearing on the day she wanted to reveal something important to him, which happened to be the same day that Kodaka wanted to tell her that he was moving. Yozora intended to come in a skirt and reveal her true gender, but she was too embarrassed to show him. She tells him to keep the fact they were childhood friends from the rest of the club members and just address her by her real name. In the clubroom, Rika and Yukimura wonder who is standing next to Kodaka, that is until Sena identifies her as Yozora. Astounded by Yozora's new look, Rika gets her to dress up in a boys' school uniform when Maria and Kobato later arrive. Kodaka contemplates what will happen from now on in the Neighbors Club.
OVA2	13	"A Round-Robin Story's Ending Is Way Extreme"; Transliteration: "Rirē Shōsetsu wa Ketsumatsu ga Hanpanai" (Japanese: リレー小説は結末が半端ない)	September 26, 2012 (Note: This Add On Disc episode of Haganai was referred to by some as the thirteenth episode, which can cause some confusion as the first episode of Haganai NEXT has also been described this way.)
Feeling they do not have much to do today, Kodaka suggests that everyone participate in a round-robin story, in which everyone takes turns writing a chapter of a novel. Naturally, things do not go well as each member tilts the story towards their preferences and desires. Yukimura starts the novel with a twisted love story, depicting Kodaka as a samurai who falls in love with Yukimura as a sandal bearer. Yozora fills her section with acts of Sena as an innocent girl being raped by large creatures in the middle of a street in a village. Kodaka, normalizing the story, writes that the samurai saves the innocent girl from the creatures and continues his quest into a cave to defeat the rest of the creatures. Sena, seeking revenge, designates Yozora as an evil queen of the creatures and portrays herself a goddess, who defeats the queen and rescues the samurai. Yozora intimidates Sena for writing about the queen licking the goddess's foot. Kobato shifts the story to a completely unrelated plot, in which the samurai discovers Kobato as a mysterious girl, taking her with him on his journey. Maria adds religious references, in which the samurai takes the mysterious girl into a church to be cleansed from her stench, only for her to disintegrate for being a vampire. Finally, Rika concludes the story with the samurai and the sandal bearer in the form of mecha merging together as if by making love with each other. Rika tells Kodaka that stories have happy endings once love is established. As the activity comes to a close, the club members prepare to make friends.

=== Haganai NEXT (2013) ===
The episodes are named after various light novel series. The broadcast for the TV series on TBS Japan was aired after midnight, so the January 10, 2013 premiere occurred on January 11, 2013. The English titles listed are from the Funimation and Hulu listings.

No. overall	No. in season	Title	Original air date
13	1	"I Think Something is Wrong With My Youth"^{[A]} Transliteration: "Yahari Ore no Seishun wa Machigatteiru" (Japanese: やはり俺の青春はまちがっている)	January 11, 2013
Sena Kashiwazaki and Yozora Mikazuki try to amuse Kodaka Hasegawa by changing their hairstyle with wigs, but to no avail. Yozora talks about a pouf, in which people increase the volume of the hair and decorate it with objects, while Rika Shiguma adds that poufs give people a sense of nobility. With Sena showing interest, Yozora and Rika manage to trick her into letting them style her hair into a pouf, filling it oddities provided by Yukimura Kusunoki with help from Maria Takayama. The next day, Sena cries to Kodaka about Pegasus Kashiwazaki disciplining her for the hairstyle, which Kodaka discreetly approves. In the library, Kodaka receives a message from Sena for him to come to the clubroom, in which he replies that he is studying. Later that night, Sena asks Kodaka about his confidence with the exams and invites him over to her house to study. Upon entering Sena's room the next day, he discovers her room is decorated with pictures of Yozora that she uses for "grudge purposes". Kodaka ends up studying very little and plays games with Sena for most of the afternoon. As he tries to leave and continue studying at home, Kodaka is asked by Pegasus to spend the night, where Pegasus expresses his worries that Sena might be getting bullied after seeing her pouf. Kodaka replies that he will protect her, not knowing what he is bringing himself into.
14	2	"Homo Game Club"^{[B]} Transliteration: "Homoge Bu" (Japanese: ホモゲ部)	January 18, 2013
Rika, who comes to the clubroom without her glasses, decides she wants to watch an anime movie based on a homoerotic game, raising eyebrows from the other club members. Kodaka convinces Yozora to give it a try, and Yozora reluctantly agrees. During the movie, Yozora and Sena find themselves engrossed in the plot. Despite being surprised by the gay kiss at the end, Yozora gives it her approval, whilst Sena is annoyed that her gal games are looked down on in comparison. After Yozora proves that the movies has no dirty dialogues, she forces Sena to read a line from her one of her gal games. Although Sena gets the courage to recite the line, Rika and Yukimura disapproves of the inappropriateness, causing Sena to run away. Later, Kodaka meets Maria's older sister, Kate Takayama, who tells him how Maria has changed since joining the Neighbors Club, particularly that Maria studies all the time, making her isolated from the world. Afterwards, Kodaka bumps into Yozora, and she asks him to "practice" comparing answers from the final exams. Yozora asks Kodaka a few math questions as well as a possible misspelling on the answer of a history question, making Kodaka worried. When they approach a history question that stumps both of them, Sena pops in with the correct answer. Sena tries to compare answers on the final exams with Yozora, but Yozora leaves instead.
15	3	"My Little Sisters Are This Cute"^{[C]} Transliteration: "Ore no Imōto-tachi ga Konna ni Kawaii" (Japanese: 俺の妹達がこんなに可愛い)	January 25, 2013
Maria shows up at Kodaka's house, having run away from home, and Kate contacts Kodaka for him to put up with Maria for the night, much to the chagrin of Kobato. During the night, Kate continuously calls Kodaka regarding Maria, prompting Kodaka to disconnect the phone. The next morning, Kate picks Maria up and makes Maria apologize to Kodaka. Next, the club members decide to have a party, where they eat snacks and drink soda. Kodaka sees Yozora drink orange juice and asks about her past when she choked on soda, making Sena and Rika suspicious. Later, Rika suggests they play the King Game, though Kodaka modifies the game by having everyone write orders beforehand and put them into a box to prevent people from quarreling each other with orders. Many unusual commands were given, with Yozora continuously insisting that the orders are absolute and must be carried out under no exceptions. However, at the end of the game, Sena draws an order commanding Kodaka to kiss her. As Sena and Kodaka try to carry the order out, Yozora objects to it and pushes them aside. Kodaka manages to clear the round by drinking from Sena's cup, making an indirect kiss. Later that night, Kodaka receives a call from Hayato Hasegawa, who asks him if he is marrying Sena.
16	4	"A Man Is Among Them!"^{[D]} Transliteration: "Kono Naka ni Hitori, Otoko ga Iru!" (Japanese: この中に１人、男がいる！)	February 1, 2013
During the phone call, Hayato mentions Pegasus being drunk, leaving Kodaka to believe it was just a drunken ramble. The next day, Sena presents Kobato a voucher for an amusement park and a flyer for a live-action show of her favorite anime, begging Kobato to join her. Yozora, taking the voucher from Sena, decides that the club members should go together, which Sena reluctantly agrees to. At the amusement park, they ride a terrifying roller coaster. Kodaka, Sena and Kobato then go to the live-action show, where the staff mistakes Sena as Kobato's mother when she offers Kobato to take part in the show. As Sena suggests Kodaka and her as a couple, Kodaka instantly rejects, leaving Sena a little bashful. After lunch, Yozora and Sena compete with each other by going on the roller coaster several times, while everyone else tries the other rides in the amusement park. Kodaka later finds Yozora and Sena nauseated, and they end up vomiting on Kodaka. The group go to the bathhouse and clean up. Then, it is discovered that Yukimura really is a girl, much to her disappointment. Yukimura initially feels sad that her chances of becoming a male are gone, but later feels happy when Kodaka still allows her to be his servant.
17	5	"You Can't Play Something Like That! My Idea of Reality Gets Screwed Up When I'm With You~"^{[E]} Transliteration: "Sonna Asobi wa Ikemasen! ~Kimi ga Iru to Sekaikan ga Midareru~" (Japanese: そんな遊びはいけません！～君がいると世界観が乱れる～)	February 8, 2013
After dressing Yukimura up as a butler which results in unwanted positive responses from the club members, Yozora agrees to play Rika's otome game, similar to Sena's gal game. During the game, Yozora overlevels her stats and rejects the men that approach her, finding the game to be stupid. She comes across Eiji Nagatani, a delinquent character in the game, and takes interest in him, though ends up downhearted when she winds up with a sad ending. Rika offers Yozora to play it again, but Yozora declines, saying that is a fate she has to accept. Rika also unsuccessfully tries to get Kodaka to recognize her new hairstyle. She comes in with blond hair using a special formula that she invented to dye her hair. Labeling it as a plain invention, Kodaka asks Rika to make something more useful. Rika brings in a time machine in the form of goggles the next day for Kodaka, which sends his conscience back to the day he last saw Yozora before he moved ten years ago. He decides to tell Yozora about the move, only for things to get weird. As Rika later reveals that the time machine is in fact a hypnotic sleeping device that allows him to see any dream he wants, Sena wonders how Kodaka knew Yozora ten years ago.
18	6	"Unbreakable Weird Girl"^{[F]} Transliteration: "Kikō Shōjo wa Kizutsukanai" (Japanese: 奇行少女は傷つかない)	February 15, 2013
Yozora admits that she and Kodaka were childhood friends, but she plays it off like it is no big deal. Seeing strange reactions, Kodaka leaves the clubroom and reenters later to find things have returned to normal. He hears Sena's game about a school festival and brings it up. Yozora reacts harshly and tries to forbid participation, labeling it as a "perfect girl" activity. However, Yozora quickly gets defeated by Sena, who wants to participate in the school festival. Trying out the maid café idea, Yozora tests each club member's skills of being a maid. Rika's tsundere act and Sena's moe act causes Yozora to dismiss the idea. Kodaka brings up the idea of a fortune telling booth, so Yozora considers it and notes that one can simply make up lies. Yozoka demonstrates this on Sena, who is fooled by the Barnum effect. Sena text messages Kodaka about her testing Yozora's fortune, but gets upset when Kodaka gets her to realize that Yozora tricked her. She later cheers up when Kobato returns to the clubroom from her remedial classes, thinking that this is the result of her fortune. Seeing that Kobato's birthday is coming up, Sena decides that a birthday party should be held for her.
19	7	"As Long As There's Love, It Doesn't Matter If I Get More Sisters, Right?"^{[G]} Transliteration: "Onii-chan dakedo Ai sae Areba Imōto ga Fuetemo Kankeinai yo ne" (Japanese: お兄ちゃんだけど愛さえあれば妹が増えても関係ないよねっ)	February 22, 2013
Yozora, Sena, Rika and Yukimura go with Kodaka to the mall in order to pick out a present for Kobato's birthday, despite each wanting to go alone with him. During the train ride, they talk about shopping for clothes, each with their unique way of shopping. After they arrive, Rika and Yukimura accompany Yozora to shop for new clothes. Kodaka helps Sena shop for a present, and they end up on the top floor of the mall at a café. Sena asks him whether or not he would consider getting a girlfriend, but he replies that he rather have friends before having a girlfriend. He then asks Sena about what she thought of him and Yozora being past friends, and Sena answers that only the present matters. After Kobato's birthday party ends well, Kodaka returns home with Kobato to cook sukiyaki using Sena's birthday present, which is ironically meat. Maria and Kate show up to join Kodaka and Kobato, with Maria also bringing Kobato a key as a joke of a present. As Maria and Kate take their leave the next morning, Kate wishes that Kodaka was more than her "big brother" and gives an obscure hint about Kodaka's supposed relationship with Sena.
20	8	"My Childhood Friends Fight Too Much"^{[H]} Transliteration: "Ore no Osananajimi ga Shuraba Sugiru" (Japanese: 俺の幼なじみが修羅場すぎる)	March 1, 2013
As the discussion returns to what to do for the cultural festival, Kobato brings up that her class is doing a movie that she is not too keen on playing the leading role. This gives the Neighbors Club the idea to do a movie themselves. In order to do research for it, Yozora invites Kodaka to go to a movie with her, only to end up watching a particularly steamy film. As they then decide to visit a cat-themed café, Yozora recalls how they once looked after an abandoned kitten, who suddenly disappeared one day, leading Yozora to become wary of making bonds with those who may suddenly disappear from her life. To everyone's surprise, Yozora turns in a script worth using, although her plan to cast her and Kodaka as the leads is thwarted when the other club members decide to put it to a vote, leading to some curious casting. The gang soon take a disliking to Yozora's subsequent alterations to the script, which put some bias towards her and Kodaka's roles. When Sena tells Yozora that her childhood friendship with Kodaka is irrelevant, Yozora reacts harshly and bursts out the clubroom in tears. Kodaka later assures Yozora that both their relationship now and ten years ago are equally important, and she soon reworks the script into something reasonable.
21	9	"Mayoi Neko Overheat"^{[I]} Transliteration: "Mayoi Neko Ōbāhīto" (Japanese: 迷い猫オーバーヒート)	March 8, 2013
As the Neighbors Club get their film underway, Kodaka comes across Sena's classmate, Aoi Yusa, who considers Sena to be her biggest rival and believes Kodaka to be Sena's boyfriend. Kodaka talks to Sena afterwards and is surprised that she does not recognize Aoi. Later that day, Kodaka comes across Pegasus, who is shocked to learn that his assumption of Kodaka in a relationship with Sena is false. The next day, Sena pulls Kodaka out for a private meeting and explains that the confusion came from a comment that she made about making Kobato her "little sister", which her father assumed was pertaining to marriage. Sena also reveals that they are technically engaged since both of their fathers had agreed to arrange a marriage for them when they were much younger. Kodaka decides that they should disregard it and keep it a secret from Yozora. However, Maria ends up blabbing about it in front of everyone, having learnt about it from Kate, leaving Yozora completely depressed. Kodaka bumps into Kate and blames her for spreading false rumors, but Kate notes that many people in school know about it. As they discuss about their club's movie, Kate notes how it reads similar to an obscure film. Upon watching the film later at night, Kodaka discovers Yozora has completely plagiarized the script.
22	10	"The "ZAN'NEN" King and the serious story"^{[J]} Transliteration: "Zannen Ō to Waraenai Hanashi" (Japanese: 残念王と笑えない話)	March 15, 2013
After Yozora's plagiarism is brought to light, the club members decide to go with a script Sena has written instead. After shooting some footage, Rika brings Kodaka to her prep room, where he sees just how much effort Rika puts into her projects. The next day, the club members head over to Kobato's school festival to watch her film, finding it to be quite impressive. Speaking with Kobato's classmates after the screening, Kodaka learns that Kobato is quite popular, but has trouble getting along with others as Kobato always hides away. He does find relief that, in the clubroom at least, Kobato gets along with Maria. At the sports festival, Yozora shows a dislike of the student council president, Hinata Hidaka, due to her popularity, and sits out for the entire sports festival. Kodaka then finds Rika on the rooftop and visits her. As Rika observes Sena taking the lead in the relay, she wonders how Kodaka really feels about Sena since the two are engaged, but Kodaka he sees Sena as just a clubmate and considers the engagement as a misunderstanding. However, Rika responds that Sena thinks otherwise and confronts Kodaka about the feelings he should notice but refuses to acknowledge. As she asks Kodaka to accept his problems, he tells her to stop and runs off.
23	11	"I'm a Confused Chicken"^{[K]} Transliteration: "Mayoeru Chikin na Ore" (Japanese: 迷えるチキンな俺)	March 22, 2013
On the day of the screening, Kodaka finds Rika had passed out with a fever before she could finish the movie. Feeling it is not right if everyone is not present to see the movie, Yozora and the others agree to cancel the screening. After briefly running into Aoi whilst taking down the flyers for the screening, Kodaka goes to the infirmary to visit Rika, who gets him to read a yaoi light novel to help her get to sleep. After recovering, Rika finishes the movie and screens it for the Neighbors Club, with everyone feeling proud of what they have made. Later, Aoi swings by the clubroom to question the club's activities, which Yozora responds to with a thorough explanation, shooting down any query that Aoi brings up. However, she soon retorts that Maria does not qualify as a club advisor since she was never a real sister. Luckily, Sena has Pegasus arrange for Maria to become an official teacher, allowing the club to continue legitimate operation. After Aoi is chased out, Sena casually mentions that even without the agreement from their fathers, she loves Kodaka and wants to marry him. Kodaka harshly reacts, making Sena realize her words. She does not deny it and looks at Kodaka. However, he once again pretends he did not hear anything and runs out, disappointing Rika.
24	12	"I Have... Friends"; Transliteration: "Boku wa Tomodachi ga..." (Japanese: 僕は友達が...)	March 29, 2013
Kodaka helps carry storage boxes for Aoi, who is a week behind on her work due to her concern about the Neighbors Club, and is eventually joined by Hinata. Impressed by his work, Hinata offers Kodaka a position on the student council. Kodaka turns down the offer, but keeps helping them out with some grunt work whilst continuing to avoid the Neighbors Club. Later in the week, Kodaka runs into Yukimura, who notes she and Sena have been regularly visiting the clubroom. Kodaka tries to get Yukimura to stop serving him as he is not worthy, but Yukimura states that even without the club, she will still look up to him. Afterwards, Kodaka is called up to the rooftop by Rika, who starts attacking him with remote-controlled steel balls as punishment for fleeing from the club and working with Aoi and Hinata to avoid dealing with Sena. Kodaka tries to explain that he felt more at home since the club was formed, aside from the fact that he left in the end. When Kodaka shuns Rika for not feeling the same way about the club, she admits that she truly wants to make friends. Kodaka asks Rika to become his official friend, and Rika responds that she and the others have always been friends. As Kodaka returns to the clubroom to speak with Sena, they all receive a text message from Yozora, who plans to go on a journey. As Maria wakes up from the sofa behind the two, Kodaka comments that their tragically flawed youth is not over just yet.

== Notes ==
The episode titles of Haganai NEXT are references to these light novel series:

A. My Teen Romantic Comedy SNAFU
B. Ranobe-bu
C. Oreimo
D. Nakaimo - My Sister Is Among Them!
E. Sonna Asobi wa Ikemasen!
F. Unbreakable Machine-Doll
G. OniAi
H. Oreshura
I. Mayoi Neko Overrun!
J. The "Hentai" Prince and the Stony Cat.
K. Mayo Chiki!
