= Oresuki =

Japanese light novel series by Rakuda and Buriki

- Cover of the first novel as published by ASCII Media Works in bunko format, featuring (from left to right) Cosmos, Pansy, and Himawari

俺を好きなのはお前だけかよ (Ore o Suki Nano wa Omae Dake ka yo)
- Genre: Harem; Romantic comedy
- Light novel
- Written by: Rakuda
- Illustrated by: Buriki
- Published by: ASCII Media Works
- Imprint: Dengeki Bunko
- Original run: February 10, 2016 – January 8, 2022
- Volumes: 17
- Manga
- Written by: Rakuda
- Illustrated by: Yū Ijima
- Published by: Shueisha
- Magazine: Shōnen Jump+
- Original run: February 26, 2017 – August 23, 2020
- Volumes: 6
- Anime television series
- Directed by: Noriaki Akitaya
- Produced by: Nobuhiro Nakayama; Takaaki Yuasa; Kozue Kaneniwa; Tomoyuki Oowada; Yoshiyuki Shioya; Yuuki Yamaoka; Masaru Takahashi; Kentarou Kotaki
- Written by: Rakuda
- Music by: Yoshiaki Fujisawa
- Studio: Connect
- Licensed by: NA: Aniplex of America
- Original network: Tokyo MX, GYT, GTV, BS11, TVA, ytv
- Original run: October 3, 2019 – December 26, 2019
- Episodes: 12 + OVA
- icon

Oresuki (俺好き), short for Ore o Suki Nano wa Omae Dake ka yo (Japanese: 俺を好きなのはお前だけかよ; lit. 'Are You Really the Only One Who Likes Me?'), is a Japanese harem–romantic comedy light novel series written by Rakuda and illustrated by Buriki. ASCII Media Works published seventeen volumes from February 2016 to January 2022 under their Dengeki Bunko imprint.

A manga adaptation with illustration by Yū Ijima was serialized via Shueisha's online manga app Shōnen Jump+ from February 2017 to August 2020. It has been collected in six tankōbon volumes. An anime television series adaptation produced by Connect aired from October to December 2019. An OVA was released in September 2020.

== Synopsis ==
Oresuki revolves around Amatsuyu "Joro" Kisaragi, an ordinary high school student who is invited out alone by two beautiful girls: the upperclassman Sakura "Cosmos" Akino and his childhood friend Aoi "Himawari" Hinata. Expecting to hear their confessions, he triumphantly goes to meet each of them in turn. However, both Cosmos and Himawari confess to Joro that they like his best friend, Taiyо̄ "Sun-chan" Ōga, instead of him. He reluctantly agrees to help both girls pursue Sun-chan in the hope of dating the loser, only to suddenly be confessed to by the unremarkable bookworm Sumireko "Pansy" Sanshokuin, who is the girl Sun-chan is in love with.

== Media ==
=== Light novel ===
Oresuki is written by Rakuda and illustrated by Buriki. ASCII Media Works published the first volume on February 10, 2016, under their Dengeki Bunko imprint. The seventeenth and last volume was published on January 8, 2022.

No.	Release date	ISBN
1	February 10, 2016	978-4-04-865747-1
2	April 9, 2016	978-4-04-865885-0
3	August 10, 2016	978-4-04-892286-9
4	January 10, 2017	978-4-04-892601-0
5	April 8, 2017	978-4-04-892831-1
6	August 10, 2017	978-4-04-893282-0
7	November 10, 2017	978-4-04-893466-4
8	March 10, 2018	978-4-04-893684-2
9	September 10, 2018	978-4-04-893913-3
10	November 10, 2018	978-4-04-912099-8
11	May 10, 2019	978-4-04-912527-6
12	October 10, 2019	978-4-04-912796-6
13	December 10, 2019	978-4-04-912908-3
14	June 10, 2020	978-4-04-913204-5
15	December 10, 2020	978-4-04-913576-3
16	July 9, 2021	978-4-04-913834-4
17	January 8, 2022	978-4-04-913904-4

=== Manga ===
A manga adaptation, illustrated by Yū Ijima, was serialized on Shueisha's online manga app Shōnen Jump+ from February 26, 2017, to August 23, 2020. The manga was compiled into six tankōbon volumes.

No.	Release date	ISBN
1	August 4, 2017	978-4-08-881135-2
2	March 2, 2018	978-4-08-881373-8
3	January 4, 2019	978-4-08-881650-0
4	October 4, 2019	978-4-08-881832-0
5	March 4, 2020	978-4-08-882144-3
6	October 2, 2020	978-4-08-882467-3

=== Anime ===
An anime television series adaptation was announced at the "Dengeki Bunko 25th Anniversary Fall Dengeki Festival" event on October 7, 2018. The series was animated by Connect and directed by Noriaki Akitaya, with Rakuda handling series composition, Shoko Takimoto designing the characters, and Yoshiaki Fujisawa composing the music. The series aired from October 3 to December 26, 2019, on Tokyo MX, GYT, GTV, BS11, TVA, and ytv. (Note: Tokyo MX listed the series premiere at 24:30 on October 2, 2019, which is October 3 at 12:30 a.m.) Shuka Saitō performed the series' opening theme song "Papapa", while Haruka Tomatsu, Haruka Shiraishi, and Sachika Misawa performed the series' ending theme song "Hanakotoba". Aniplex of America licensed the series for distribution in English speaking regions, and streamed the series on Crunchyroll, FunimationNow in North America and the United Kingdom, Hidive in North America, and AnimeLab in Australia and New Zealand. An OVA was set to premiere on May 23, 2020, but was delayed to September 2, 2020.

No.	Title (Note: All English titles are taken from Crunchyroll.)	Original air date
1	"I'm Really Just an Ordinary High School Student"; Transliteration: "Ore tte honto, doko ni demo iru heibonna Koukousei nan da" (Japanese: 俺ってほんと、どこにでもいる平凡なモブなんだ)	October 3, 2019
Joro begins his life as a high school student. Both the student council president Cosmos and Joro's childhood friend Himawari ask him to go out on a date. On Saturday, Joro goes on his date with Cosmos, but at the end she reveals her objective was to ask him to help her get close to the person she loves, Sun-chan, ace baseball player of the school and Joro's best friend. On the next day, Joro goes on his date with Himawari and she tells him the same thing. Both girls evidently fell in love with Sun-chan during the regional baseball finals the previous year. Joro reluctantly agrees to help both of them, at the back of his mind thinking he can at least get together with whoever loses. Constantly harassed at school by the two girls to help, Joro seeks solitude during lunch hour at the deserted school library. There he is approached by the librarian Pansy, who has been stalking him and confesses she is in love with him.
2	"I'm Attacked by an Impossible Spiral"; Transliteration: "Ore ni osoi kakaru make no supairaru" (Japanese: 俺に襲い掛かる負のスパイラル)	October 10, 2019
Joro continues trying to help Himawari and Cosmos get closer to Sun-chan, but progress is slow on both ends. He is blackmailed into seeing Pansy during lunch, who reveals Sun-chan is in love with someone. When Joro prods Sun-chan about his crush, Sun-chan confesses he is in love with Pansy, who he ran into at the regional baseball finals the previous year. Joro tries to get Pansy to go out with Sun-chan, but ends up making her upset. At the library, Joro is suddenly approached by Sun-chan, Himawari, and Cosmos, who reveal they know he's been playing them along.
3	"I Was Meeting You"; Transliteration: "Anata ni atta" (Japanese: あなたに会った)	October 17, 2019
After being confronted by Sun-chan, Himawari, Cosmos, and Pansy for his scheme, Joro gets knocked out by Sun-chan. Due to a student watching the confrontation, the school finds out about the incident and the student body ostracizes Joro. Receiving a text from Pansy after a week of bullying, Joro goes to the library to hear Pansy's "true feelings", only to witness Sun-chan flirting with Pansy. Suddenly, Pansy reveals she knew Sun-chan had tricked Joro by using Himawari and Cosmos' feelings for him to manipulate them into trapping Joro into a bad situation. When confronted into his motives, Sun-chan admits he had been in a situation like Joro in middle school, only in reverse, and he wanted revenge on Joro for taking away the one girl he had a crush on. Pansy rejects Sun-chan's feelings for her, revealing she had fallen for Joro after seeing him wait for Sun-chan at the regional baseball finals with his favorite foods. Sun-chan tries to force himself onto Pansy, but Joro comes to her aid and berates him for hurting the girls who love him. The next day, Himawari and Cosmos fend off the bullies (they had also watched the confrontation in another part of the library) and Sun-chan apologizes in front of the class. Joro reports this to Pansy, but he still does not want to keep seeing her in the library. Pansy then undoes her braids and shirt, revealing her true form: a beautiful and large-breasted girl who Joro had encountered at the baseball finals. Joro decides to start visiting her everyday.
4	"The Results of My Hard Work"; Transliteration: "Ore ga ganbatta kekka" (Japanese: 俺がガンバった結果)	October 24, 2019
Joro, Sun-chan, Himawari, and Cosmos feel depressed over everything that has happened between them, leading Pansy to encourage Joro to make up with them so they can become friends again. He successfully is able to do so with both Himawari and Sun-chan, albeit almost forgetting to with Cosmos. Together with Pansy, the group of 5 now gather at the library after school to study for mid-terms. After much tutoring from Cosmos and Pansy, everyone passes the mid-terms.
5	"I Thought It Was Working Out Too Well For Me"; Transliteration: "Ore ni shite wa, umaku iki sugiteru to omottanda yo......" (Japanese: 俺にしては、うまくいきすぎてると思ったんだよ。。。。。。)	October 31, 2019
Joro appears to be getting a confession from his classmate Asunaro, a member of the Newspaper Club. However, it turns out she is accusing him of being a scumbag who is three-timing Pansy, Himawari, and Cosmos. She threatens to expose his misdeeds by publishing an article, and after Joro protests his innocence. Asunaro agrees to shadow him and wait till the Flower Dance Festival before deciding. To get Asunaro off his back, Joro asks the three girls to avoid him for a while but they refuse. Joro is picked as the Flower Boy for the Flower Dance Festival, a traditional festival where one boy will dance with three girls. Himawari and Cosmos are two of the girls but no wants to be the third girl due to the rumors flying around Joro. In the end, Sun-chan becomes the third "girl" for the dance, leading the 4 of them to practice together. Asunaro's article on Joro gets accidentally published and he is confronted by the class' queen bee Sasanqua about it. Asunaro apologizes but due to the article, Pansy, Himawari, and Cosmos agree they should leave Joro alone in the meanwhile. To make up for this, Asunaro offers to practice with Joro instead for the Flower Dance.
6	"When I Need to Say Something, I'll Say It"; Transliteration: "Ore wa, iu toki wa iu" (Japanese: 俺は、言う時は言う)	November 7, 2019
The day of the Flower Dance is arrives and due to the PTO learning the third "girl" in the dance is a boy, they protest and Sun-chan is forced to drop out of the dance. Joro asks Asunaro to take his place as she has been practicing with him and would be the most logical replacement. However before they can, Cosmos insists on talking to Asunaro alone about it but Joro insists on tagging along. In the student council office, Cosmos reveals Asunaro was spreading rumors about Joro to isolate him, and told the PTO about Sun-chan, all as a ploy so she could become the third girl of the Flower Dance. Evidently, Asunaro has been in love with Joro since the regional baseball finals but since he is constantly surrounded by the three girls, she came up with this plan to get close to him. Joro rejects Asunaro and she goes to print a retraction of the article. Cosmos informs the third girl for the Flower Dance is Pansy and this was their plan all along. At the Flower Dance, Joro dances flawlessly with Himawari, Cosmos, and then Pansy. Pansy appears in her true form and the school is abuzz with the appearance of the mysterious beautiful girl.
7	"I Discover an Unexpected Side"; Transliteration: "Ore wa igaina ichi men o shiru" (Japanese: 俺は意外な一面を知る)	November 14, 2019
Joro, Sun-chan, Pansy, Himawari, and Cosmos go to a water amusement park. The three girls have a competition to see who Joro has the most fun with. Joro goes with Himawari on a water slide, Cosmos to ride a dolphin float, and Pansy for a hot spring bath. During the day, Joro has a chance encounter with Sasanqua, who he does not recognize, who is feeling bad about threatening him after hearing about the rumors. Joro inadvertently gives her advice and mentions offhand he prefers black hair to dyed hair. At the end of the day, Joro declares Sun-chan the person he had the most fun with. The next day in school, Sasanqua has changed her hair to black and she with her gang apologize to Joro.
8	"Before I Knew it, My Tragedy Had Already Begun"; Transliteration: "Ore no Higeki wa kizuku to hajimatteru" (Japanese: 俺の悲劇は気づくと始まってる)	November 21, 2019
A new transfer girl Tsubaki has appeared and she creates a ruckus by kissing Joro's hand and saying she is indebted to him. Evidently during the regional baseball finals, Joro bought a lot of food from her food stand and gave her encouragement when her shop was on the verge of collapse. Thanks to Joro, her family shop did a turnaround and even opened a second branch. At the library later on, Pansy lends Joro her prize book and asks him to read it. On his way home, he bumps into Himawari and accidentally drops the book. After realizing he lost it, he goes looking for it and encounters two girls who help him. The girls find Pansy's book, but it has already been badly damaged. The girls tell him the book is a rare one and it very expensive. Despite Pansy mentioning she does not need a replacement book, Joro insists on getting a new book for Pansy so he works part time at Tsubaki's shop.
9	"My Conclusion After Much Consideration"; Transliteration: "Ore nari ni kangaeta kekka" (Japanese: 俺なりに考えた結果)	November 28, 2019
Despite starting the part-time job well, Joro accidentally spills beer on a customer and gets a lashing down. Dejected from messing up on the job, he takes it out on Pansy but quickly regrets it. While brooding over this, he has a chance encounter with a stranger called Hose who gives him some advice on patching things up. Joro takes his advice and patches things up with Pansy. His part-time job goes off without a hitch and he finally receives his paycheck. He goes to buy the replacement book for Pansy but someone just bought the last copy before him. Dejected, he encounters Himawari who is revealed to be the person who bought the book and gives it to Joro. Himawari had noticed the damaged book and wanted to give him a new copy, and had used the money she had been saving up to buy a new tennis racket for her important tennis tournament. Joro gets angry as he wanted Himawari to focus on her tennis tournament, however they soon make-up, and Joro gets her a new racket as a birthday present, as she goes on to win the qualifiers for the tennis tournament.
9.5	"I Politely Move Things Forward"; Transliteration: "Ore wa teinei ni susumeru" (Japanese: 俺は丁寧に進める)	December 5, 2019
Recap episode of the first 9 episodes of the anime, narrated by Joro and Tampopo.
10	"Even I'm Useful Once in a While"; Transliteration: "Ore datte tama ni wa katsuyaku suru" (Japanese: 俺だってたまには活躍する)	December 12, 2019
Joro seems to be on the verge of another confession from a first-year girl called Tampopo, who is also the baseball team manager. However, it turns out she wants his help to hook-up Pansy and Sun-chan. Tampopo believes getting Sun-chan a girlfriend would help his mental state and bring out his baseball talent more, thus helping the team. She had figured out Pansy was the mysterious third girl at the Flower Dance. Afraid that she might reveal Pansy's secret, Joro reluctantly agrees to help. After some shenanigans, Pansy confronts Tampopo and reveals her feelings for Joro, thus making Tampopo give up her plan.
11	"I May Not Be Needed"; Transliteration: "Ore wa iranai kamo shirenai" (Japanese: 俺はいらないかもしれない)	December 19, 2019
The school library is on the verge of being shut down due to lack of use. Joro encounters Hose again and he agrees to help. Hose brings along two girls as added help, who happen to be the same ones helped Joro find Pansy's book. They introduce themselves as Cherry and Tsukimi. It turns out Hose has been the person Pansy has been desperately trying to avoid, even changing her appearance so he could not recognize her. Hose, Cherry, Tsukimi, and Pansy were all in the same middle school, but Hose became too obsessed with Pansy, thus causing her to cut all contact and go to a different high school and go incognito. Cherry and Tsukimi later reveal they are in love with Hose, but realize he is in love with Pansy, so they want to support his love and make them a couple.
12	"The One I Love Is..."; Transliteration: "Ore ga suki nano wa....." (Japanese: 俺が好きなのは。。。。。)	December 26, 2019
The school library has at last been saved and receiving more attention from students than usual. However Hose still continues to visit the library daily, making Pansy very uncomfortable. Sun-chan tries to help by asking Pansy to be his girlfriend so as to discourage Hose, but Hose remains relentless. Joro tries to help also by proposing a challenge with Hose, with the loser cutting all ties with Pansy. The challenge is for the girls to decide who she should be with, by giving either Joro or Hose the most hair barrettes. In addition, they decide whichever high school wins the upcoming regional baseball finals gets another vote. Joro thinks he has the advantage cause four of the girls are his friends, however right off the bat, Himawari, Cosmos, and Asurano give their barrettes to Hose and confess their love to Joro, stunning him.
OVA	"Our Playball/ Our End Run/ Our Game"; Transliteration: "Oretachi no Gēmusetto" (Japanese: 俺たちのゲームセット)	September 2, 2020
On the day of the big game, Sun-chan thinks back to his early time playing baseball, where the rest of his teammates, including his supposed friend Shiba, shun him for his skills and getting all the attention, so he develops his cheerful "Sun-chan" persona to counteract them, fearing being hated by others. Joro recalls the rules of his challenge with Hose, and how the rest of the girls added new stipulations, hindering some of Joro's plans. Himawari, alongside Cosmos and Asurano, calls Joro to meet up with them at the stadium, but he leaves early to hide from them, as everyone being together would result in the end of the competition. As he arrives at the stadium, Sun-chan remembers first meeting Joro in middle school, and how getting a quick glance at Joro's "true self" leads him to recognize him as a kindred spirit and seek to be friends. With the game starting, and after finishing up a favour, Joro meets up with Pansy who asks him how he feels about her, but he's unable to answer as Hose shows up to talk with her. He ends up helping a lost young girl find her sister, running into Cherry who stands her ground about sacrificing her love for Hose's. He bumps into Hose, ready to call everyone together, but leaves to find a better phone service, allowing Joro to sneak away. He comes across another girl looking for a key, which thanks to Sasanqua and her group, they manage to find. He finds Tsukimi but before he can try and convince her, is captured by Himawari and Asurano, as well as Hose, who wants to talk first. On the bench, Sun-chan remembers back to middle school how Joro stood up to Shiba defending him, making him realize he doesn't put on his fake persona to make others like him, but rather to protect those he cares about. Hose approaches Joro adding a new stipulation to the competition, whoever loses can never interact with Pansy OR any of her friends either. Hose takes off his mask to reveal he is fully aware of Cherry and Tsukimi's feelings for him, and how he can't stand how far Joro has gotten for being a "background character" so wants to destroy all of his relationships. Sun-chan recalls the time when the girl he had a crush on confessed her love to Joro to him, while also witnessing Shiba make a move in the baseball game allowing them to score a point. After Tampopo gives him a hat as a good luck charm, he goes to thank Shiba, who apologizes for the way he's treated him all these years due to jealously, which he accepts, given his own personal history with underhanded tricks. As Joro, Hose, and the girls get together to conclude the competition, Cosmos and Himawari convince Cherry and Tsukimi to be true to their feelings if their relationship means so much, allowing them to confess their love to Hose, which he declines. Cherry gives her barrette to Joro, though Tsukimi gives hers to Hose. With Hose seemingly winning, Joro reveals his secret strategy, he got Tsubaki, Sasanqua, her friends, and the girls he helped to give him barrettes, giving him the most. However, Hose reveals he knew about his scheme and called on all the girls at his school to give him barrettes, giving him 98. Hose reveals to the girls they can only be with Joro again if they stop being friends with Pansy, which they refuse, making her feel happy. Sun-chan and Tampopo show up revealing Joro's other secret strategy, with Sun-chan bringing together all the girls from their school to give him barrettes, ending up with 98 as well, completely shocking Hose at how in sync the two actually are. Sun-chan reveals Nishikizuta won the game, gaining last minute inspiration thanks to a message on the hat from Joro. Desperate to tie, Hose begs Pansy to give him her barrette, with Joro telling her to do what she wants, leading her to transform into her "true form", giving the barrette to Joro and once again confessing her feelings to him, as well as telling Hose to never approach her or her friends ever again. After Cherry and Tsukimi drag a passed out Hose away, the girls, plus Sasanqua, wait to hear Joro's answer of who he is in love with. He seemingly confesses to Pansy, but then proceeds to confess to Cosmos, Himawari, and Asurano, confusing and annoying them. He declares he wants to be with all of them, having one person for each day of the week, also throwing in Sasanqua for the Friday, so the girls all angrily leave him behind in response. Tsubaki afterwards figures out despite his insistence, he did this to preserve the girls friendship with each other, rather than potentially fracturing it by picking someone. He meets up with Sun-chan with several bags of skewers, as he tells him he wants to share the skewers with him for winning the competition at the pool earlier. The boys enjoy their food together, while the girls watch cheerfully in the shadows, as Sun-chan thinks about all the girls who fell for him eventually fell for Joro, while Joro is the one always by his side, wondering "Are you the only one who loves me?" That night, Joro runs into Pansy, free from her disguise, thanking him for his help and once again asserting her love for him as they walk back home together.

== See also ==
- List of harem anime and manga
- Shine Post — Another light novel series by the same author and illustrator.
