= A Salad Bowl of Eccentrics =

Japanese light novel series

- First light novel volume cover

変人のサラダボウル (Henjin no Sarada Bōru)
- Genre: Comedy; Reverse isekai
- Light novel
- Written by: Yomi Hirasaka
- Illustrated by: Kantoku
- Published by: Shogakukan
- Imprint: Gagaga Bunko
- Original run: October 19, 2021 – July 17, 2026
- Volumes: 10
- Manga

Henjin no Salad Bowl @comic
- Written by: Yomi Hirasaka
- Illustrated by: Kōtarō Yamada
- Published by: Shogakukan
- Imprint: Sunday GX Comics
- Magazine: Sunday Webry; Monthly Sunday Gene-X
- Original run: September 27, 2022 – December 3, 2024
- Volumes: 6
- Anime television series
- Directed by: Masafumi Satō
- Written by: Yomi Hirasaka; Kenichi Yamashita
- Music by: Misaki Umase; Tsugumi Tanaka; Hanae Nakamura
- Studio: SynergySP; Studio Comet
- Licensed by: Crunchyroll
- Original network: TBS, BS11, AT-X, GYT, CBC
- Original run: April 5, 2024 – June 21, 2024
- Episodes: 12
- icon

A Salad Bowl of Eccentrics (Japanese: 変人のサラダボウル, Hepburn: Henjin no Sarada Bōru) is a Japanese light novel series written by Yomi Hirasaka and illustrated by Kantoku. The story takes place in Gifu, where Hirasaka comes from. It was published from October 2021 to July 2026 under Shogakukan's Gagaga Bunko imprint, with ten volumes released. A manga adaptation illustrated by Kōtarō Yamada was serialized in Shogakukan's Sunday Webry website from September 2022 to December 2024, with its chapters collected into six tankōbon volumes. An anime television series adaptation produced by SynergySP and Studio Comet aired from April to June 2024.

== Plot ==
When the Ofim Empire falls in a rebellion, Princess Sara Da Odin and her knight Livia Do Udis escape through a portal to Earth, but are separated. Sara is taken in by the detective Sōsuke Kaburaya while Livia becomes a homeless person. Sara assists Sōsuke in his cases with some eccentric clients.

== Characters ==
Sara Da Odin (サラ・ダ・オディン)
Voiced by: Hinaki Yano
A 13-year-old princess from another world who ends up living with Sōsuke. She can use magic. She becomes a fan of Case Closed. Over time she starts thinking of Sōsuke like a surrogate father, and eventually revealed to have fallen in love with him due to his kindness. Her new name is Sara Kusanagi (草薙 沙羅, Kusanagi Sara). She later transfers to an elementary school, much to her friend Yuna's chagrin since they would not be going to the same school.
Livia Do Udis (リヴィア・ド・ウーディス, Rivia Do Ūdisu)
Voiced by: M.A.O
A knight who protected Sara in the other world. After finding herself in Japan, she initially lives a homeless life while trying to find Sara before becoming Noa's roommate. Here she is reunited with Sara. She reunites with Sara and lands a job as an assistant at Sosuke's agency, but is immediately fired after struggling. After this, she takes on various jobs, only to leave them early for various reasons. She gains a taste for eating grasshoppers. She would go on to join Puriketsu's reformed band as a guitarist.
Sōsuke Kaburaya (鏑矢 惣助, Kaburaya Sōsuke)
Voiced by: Makoto Furukawa
A 29-year-old private detective who operates an agency in Gifu. Sara ends up living with him and assisting him in his work. His real last name is Kusanagi (草薙, Kusanagi) and he is the son of Isao, a veteran private detective.
Puriketsu (プリケツ, Puriketsu)
Voiced by: Yō Taichi
She is an aspiring musician who started out being the vocalist of the band Setsuko, That Ain't the Drop before it was disbanded. She formerly worked at a cabaret club that Livia briefly worked at before it was shut down. Later on, she reforms her band with Livia and Noa as members. Although the band quickly gained popularity, they had to put their activities on hold after Noa was arrested. Her real name is Asumi Yumisahi (弓指 明日美, Yumisahi Asumi).
Noa Minakami (皆神 望愛, Minakami Noa)
Voiced by: Akane Fujita
A 22-year-old woman who is the leader of a cult. She develops an obsession for Livia after meeting her. She is also the songwriter for Puriketsu's reformed band, being a skilled musician herself. However, she is later arrested and jailed due to insider trading. Her real name is Noa Kinoshita (木下 望愛, Kinoshita Noa).
Brenda Aisaki (愛崎 ブレンダ, Aisaki Burenda)
Voiced by: Manami Numakura
A lawyer who frequently works with Sōsuke. Despite her appearance, she is actually 34 years old, making her older than him. She is in love with Sosuke.
Yuna Naganawa (永縄 友奈, Naganawa Yuna)
Voiced by: Yūki Takada
A middle school student who becomes friends with Sara after she and Sosuke helped resolve her bullying problems.
Haruka Neya (閨 春花, Neya Haruka)
Voiced by: Mizuki Mano
A detective who worked under Sosuke before he left the agency. She is in love with Sosuke.
Isao Kusanagi (草薙 勲, Kusanagi Isao)
Voiced by: Yōji Ueda
He is Sōsuke's father and a veteran detective.
Takeo (タケオ)
Voiced by: Shinnosuke Tachibana
A delinquent who often tricks Livia into doing odd jobs, such as becoming a hostess and a scalper. His real name is Masatake Ozeki (尾關 正武, Ozeki Masatake). A public security policeman who pretends to be a well-connected gangster in the underworld. Investigate criminal organizations active in the city, and sometimes gain the trust of members as accomplices in crime.
Suzuki (鈴木)
Voiced by: Kohsuke Toriumi
A homeless man that Livia used to live with before leaving to go back to being a writer. When he came back to visit Livia, he was asked to write a song for Puriketsu, Noa, and Livia's band. His real name is Akira Suzukiri (鈴切 章, Suzukiri Akira).

== Media ==
=== Light novel ===
Written by Yomi Hirasaka and illustrated by Kantoku, A Salad Bowl of Eccentrics was published from October 19, 2021, to July 17, 2026, under Shogakukan's Gagaga Bunko imprint. A total of ten volumes were released.

No.	Japanese release date	Japanese ISBN
1	October 19, 2021	978-4-09-453038-4
2	February 18, 2022	978-4-09-453052-0
3	June 17, 2022	978-4-09-453073-5
4	December 20, 2022	978-4-09-453099-5
5	July 19, 2023	978-4-09-453136-7
6	February 19, 2024	978-4-09-453166-4
7	July 18, 2024	978-4-09-453196-1
8	April 18, 2025	978-4-09-453239-5
9	December 18, 2025	978-4-09-453275-3
10	July 17, 2026	978-4-09-453303-3

=== Manga ===
A manga adaptation illustrated by Kōtarō Yamada began serialization on Shogakukan's Sunday Webry website on September 27, 2022. It also began serialization in Shogakukan's Monthly Sunday Gene-X magazine on November 17 of the same year. The manga ended serialization on December 3, 2024. Six tankōbon volumes were released from February 2023 to January 2025.

No.	Japanese release date	Japanese ISBN
1	February 10, 2023	978-4-09-851640-7
2	June 12, 2023	978-4-09-852094-7
3	November 10, 2023	978-4-09-853011-3
4	April 12, 2024	978-4-09-853199-8
5	June 11, 2024	978-4-09-853343-5
6	January 10, 2025	978-4-09-853785-3

=== Anime ===
An anime television series adaptation was announced on July 6, 2023. It was produced by SynergySP and Studio Comet and directed by Masafumi Satō, with scripts written by Yomi Hirasaka and Kenichi Yamashita, characters designed by Kazuhiro Fukuchi, and music composed by Misaki Umase, Tsugumi Tanaka, and Hanae Nakamura. The series aired from April 5 to June 21, 2024, on TBS and other networks. (Note: TBS lists the series premiere at 25:28 JST on April 4, 2024, which is effectively 1:28 a.m. on April 5.) The opening theme song is "Gifu-ni-ted" (ギフにテッド), performed by Wanuka, while the ending theme song is "Konban no Kenka" (今晩の喧嘩; lit. 'Tonight's Fight'), performed by Meiyo Densetsu. Crunchyroll licensed the series.

==== Episodes ====
No.	Title (Note: All English titles are taken from Crunchyroll.)	Directed by (Note: Information is taken from the ending credits of each episode.)	Written by	Storyboarded by	Original release date
1	"Awaiting Kirin (From Another World)"; Transliteration: "Kirin ga Kuru (Isekai kara)" (Japanese: 麒麟がくる（異世界から）)	Masafumi Satō	Yomi Hirasaka	Masafumi Satō	April 5, 2024
With the Ofim Empire falling in a rebellion, the 7th princess Sara da Odin and her attendant Livia de Udis escape by jumping into the portal that transports them to modern-day Gifu. Sara lands on top of Sosuke Kaburaya, a struggling private eye detective who operates his own agency. Meanwhile, Livia ends up living together with the homeless man Suzuki by the Nagara River. Sara causes an explosion at a park with her magic, and Sosuke decides to take her in fearing that will get too careless with her magical powers, which would get her in trouble. The next day, Sosuke goes shopping with Sara, and that night Sosuke continues his current assignment to tail the client's husband without any new leads, while Sara reads the Detective Conan manga that gives her a more heroic viewpoint of detectives. The following night, Sosuke tails the husband, following him all the way to an abandoned building, learning that the husband has been blackmailed. After seeing the husband getting beaten up, Sosuke intervenes, and then Sara arrives having tailed Sosuke. Sara uses her magic to subdue the criminals for the police to arrest. That night, Sosuke treats Sara to hidagyu at the agency and tells her to never do anything on her own again.
2	"Homeless Lady Knight"; Transliteration: "Hōmuresu Onna Kishi" (Japanese: ホームレス女騎士)	Hisaya Takabayashi	Kenichi Yamashita	Hisaya Takabayashi	April 12, 2024 (Note: Due to the broadcast of the 2024 Masters Tournament, this episode aired at 2:28 a.m. JST, 1 hour after the original air time on TBS.)
2	"Homeless Lady Knight After"; Transliteration: "Hōmuresu Onna Kishi Afutā" (Japanese: ホームレス女騎士アフター)	Hisaya Takabayashi	Kenichi Yamashita	Hisaya Takabayashi	April 12, 2024
2	"First Job"; Transliteration: "Hajimete no Oshigoto" (Japanese: はじめてのおしごと)	Hisaya Takabayashi	Kenichi Yamashita	Hisaya Takabayashi	April 12, 2024
After spending a few days living homeless with Suzuki, Livia is looking to earn money and gets a job working as a hostess at a sexy cabaret club. However, after her first night on the job the club is raided by the police for conducting illegal business and Livia flees, returning to Suzuki for another job lead. The next day, she reunites with Sara and lands a job as an assistant at Sosuke's agency, but is immediately fired after struggling. The next day, Sosuke meets with Brenda Aisaki, a 34-year-old lawyer who looks like a kid, to introduce Sara to her, as well as to get his next job. The client is a husband who wants to file a divorce, but his wife refuses, and Sosuke is asked to investigate the matter. Sara uses levitation magic and learns that the wife is having a sexual relationship with the landscaper who maintains the backyard in their house. Sosuke submits the photo Sara took to Brenda, passing on the photo as being taken by a drone. That night, Sosuke treats Sara to another meal of hidagyu.
3	"The Homeless Gourmet"; Transliteration: "Hōmuresu no Gurume" (Japanese: ホームレスのグルメ)	Masahiko Matsunaga	Yomi Hirasaka	Naoyuki Kuzuya	April 19, 2024
3	"The Savior Lady Knight"; Transliteration: "Kyūseishu Onna Kishi" (Japanese: 救世主女騎士)	Masahiko Matsunaga	Yomi Hirasaka	Naoyuki Kuzuya	April 19, 2024
Livia resorts to cooking grasshoppers and finding them tasty, that she cooks some for the homeless encampment. The next day, Livia is approached by two members from the World's Branch Hill Clan, a shady organization claiming to be on a mission to make everybody happy. As Livia heads to their clan home, two other members attempts to scam Sosuke into buying a statue and fail. At the clan home, Livia plays a game of basketball and shows off her athletic ability, while scoring with a slam dunk. Afterwards, Livia watches a movie about how Kenji, a college student, had a life-changing experience after meeting the clan's head Noa Minakami, claiming that she has magical powers to make miracles. After eating dinner, the clan has a meeting with Noa. The clan member Uchiyama is called onto the stage and he threatens to kill Noa and tells everybody that she is a con artist. Uchiyama stabs himself to expose Noa as a fraud, but he is healed by Livia's healing magic. Livia is hailed by the clan as their true savior with Noa offering her position, but she refuses and runs away.
4	"The Princess and Skateboards"; Transliteration: "Hime to Sukebō" (Japanese: 姫とスケボー)	Kenichirō Watanabe	Kenichi Yamashita	Kenichirō Watanabe	April 26, 2024
4	"Halloween in Gifu"; Transliteration: "Harowin in Gifu" (Japanese: ハロウィン IN 岐阜)	Kenichirō Watanabe	Kenichi Yamashita	Kenichirō Watanabe	April 26, 2024
Sara tries skateboarding and keeps on falling. Sosuke and Sara run into Haruka Neya, a detective who worked under Sosuke while he was at the agency. Haruka asks Sosuke to take on a case requested by Mami Naganawa to investigate her daughter Yuna, who is being bullied at school but has kept quiet. Sosuke interrogates Yuna at her house, learning that the bully, Aoki, is the daughter of the president of the company Mami works for and that Aoki's mother gave Mami her job when Yuna's father passed away. Aoki has been bullying Yuna to show her superiority, and worried that Mami would lose her job if she came forward, Yuna remained silent. The next day, Yuna uses a pen with a hidden camera to obtain proof that Aoki had been bullying her to resolve the case. Sometime later, Sara dresses up as a witch for a Halloween event at a shopping arcade. After taking a selfie in front of a statue of Oda Nobunaga, Sosuke asks Sara if she actually came from Japan, realizing that her magic can be recreated with technology, but impossible for translating an unknown language. Sara explains that her world is a parallel version of Japan whose history diverges with the Honnoji incident in which Nobunaga survived and unified the nation to create the Ofim Empire. Meanwhile, Livia goes trick or treating having not read the fine print about the treats being for young children only.
5	"The Homeless Lady Knight Resets"; Transliteration: "Hōmuresu Onna Kishi, Totonō" (Japanese: ホームレス女騎士、ととのう)	Fumio Maezono	Yomi Hirasaka	Tomoko Iwasaki	May 3, 2024
5	"The Princess and Karaoke Cafés"; Transliteration: "Hime to Karaoke Kissa" (Japanese: 姫とカラオケ喫茶)	Fumio Maezono	Yomi Hirasaka	Tomoko Iwasaki	May 3, 2024
5	"The Homeless Lady Knight Lines Up"; Transliteration: "Hōmuresu Onna Kishi, Narabu" (Japanese: ホームレス女騎士、並ぶ)	Fumio Maezono	Yomi Hirasaka	Tomoko Iwasaki	May 3, 2024
Sara learns to ride a bike to meet up with Yuna at a place that's only accessible by bike. Meanwhile, Livia takes a bath at a public bath house and meets Puriketsu, who she briefly worked with at the cabaret club that shut down after the raid, again learning that her real name is Asumi Yumisashi and she is an aspiring musician who ran away from home. She had been living with one of her bandmates, but the band members decide to quit due to low viewership and Puriketsu's cabaret job leading to her band Setsuko, That Ain't the Drop to disband. The next day, Sosuke takes Sara to a café for breakfast and sings karaoke on stage. Shortly afterwards, Puriketsu sings on stage to delight the customers. Meanwhile, Livia is approached by her former boss at the cabaret café with a one-time gig to line up and buy limited-edition merchandise for him having been convinced that she's doing it to help people who cannot make it to the stores buy it. But when she meets up with Sosuke and Sara again, Sosuke tells her that she is actually helping a scalper profit illegally through resale of the merchandise and advises her to never do it again.
6	"The Religious Leader and the Savior"; Transliteration: "Shūkyōka-chan to Kyūseishu-chan" (Japanese: 宗教家ちゃんと救世主ちゃん)	Fumio Maezono	Kenichi Yamashita	Kazumi Nonaka	May 10, 2024
6	"The Mooching Lady Knight"; Transliteration: "Himo Onna Kishi" (Japanese: ヒモ女騎士)	Fumio Maezono	Kenichi Yamashita	Kazumi Nonaka	May 10, 2024
6	"The Lady Knight Joins a Band"; Transliteration: "Bandoman Onna Kishi" (Japanese: バンドマン女騎士)	Fumio Maezono	Kenichi Yamashita	Kazumi Nonaka	May 10, 2024
Noa approaches Livia requesting her assistance to get statues of herself produced to sell and Livia agrees. Noa brings Livia to her home office to get her body scanned to create a 3D model for the statue. Afterwards, Noa pays Livia a ton of money while offering to make her the product development advisor with the benefit of living with Noa, and Livia accepts. During the week since accepting the position, Livia goes around living as a mooch from eating at regular restaurants to gambling at a pachinko parlor with Noa paying for everything. Livia then takes a bath and runs into Puriketsu again, who asks her to form a new band. Livia agrees to give it a try as a guitarist having mentioned her experience playing the biwa. Livia returns home and asks Noa if she plays music, replying that she composes the songs for her organization's promotional videos and plays the keyboard. Livia hands Noa one of Puriketsu's songs to listen to, critiquing it in great detail that praises Puriketsu's singing, but criticizes her songwriting. After taking guitar lessons for a week, Livia shows off her guitar skills to Puriketsu. Needing to write better songs, Livia takes Puriketsu to meet with Noa. After criticizing Puriketsu's songwriting and suggesting that somebody else writes her songs, Noa shows off her songwriting skills and Puriketsu decides to ask Noa to join the band as its songwriter, and motivated by being together with Livia, Noa accepts.
7	"The Princess and the Kotatsu"; Transliteration: "Hime to Kotatsu" (Japanese: 姫とこたつ)	Shinya Une	Yomi Hirasaka	Naoyuki Kuzuya	May 17, 2024
7	"The Girl from Another World and Family Register Issues"; Transliteration: "Isekai Hito no Koseki Mondai" (Japanese: 異世界人の戸籍問題)	Shinya Une	Yomi Hirasaka	Naoyuki Kuzuya	May 17, 2024
7	"The Princess and Horses"; Transliteration: "Hime to Uma" (Japanese: 姫と馬)	Shinya Une	Yomi Hirasaka	Naoyuki Kuzuya	May 17, 2024
With the arrival of winter, Sosuke and Sara eat hot pot while sitting under a kotatsu table. Afterwards, Sara expresses her desire to attend school. The next day, Sosuke and Sara see Brenda asking for legal advice that will allow Sara to enroll in school. With Sosuke passing Sara off as an orphan of an unknown lineage, Brenda suggests that he either gets a new family register that requires a background check or doing something illegal unaware that Sara is from another world. After the meeting, Sara insists that she is fine not attending school and not risk exposing her secret, while Brenda and her assistant Tateyama become curious to figure out who Sara really is. Brenda gets another client, and Neya is hired to take care of the case and does so after tailing the culprit for ten days. Sometime later, Sosuke gets his next assignment to investigate Yohei Ichinose, a liquor store shopkeeper who has been spending too much time with his deliveries lately. While tailing Yohei, Sara shows that she can change her hair color to blend in as a typical Japanese girl. Three days later, Sosuke follows Yohei to a horse racetrack, learning that he gambles on horse races. Sosuke decides to place a 100-yen bet on the next race with Sara picking the horses and she perfectly picks the trifecta every time earning Sosuke lots of money. Afterwards, Yohei tells Sosuke that he is a horse racing enthusiast and only places 100-yen bets for fun, and Sosuke suggests that Yohei should bring his family the next time he goes, with Yohei getting the impression that Sara is Sosuke's daughter.
8	"The Princess and the Father"; Transliteration: "Hime to Chichioya" (Japanese: 姫と父親)	Kyōhei Suzuki	Kenichi Yamashita	Kyōhei Suzuki	May 24, 2024
8	"The Princess and Her Friend"; Transliteration: "Hime to Tomodachi" (Japanese: 姫と友達)	Kyōhei Suzuki	Kenichi Yamashita	Kyōhei Suzuki	May 24, 2024
8	"Little Miss Religious Leader Eats Grasshoppers"; Transliteration: "Shūkyōga-chan, Batta o Taberu" (Japanese: 宗教家ちゃん、バッタを食べる)	Kyōhei Suzuki	Kenichi Yamashita	Kyōhei Suzuki	May 24, 2024
8	"The Princess and Age"; Transliteration: "Hime to Nenrei" (Japanese: 姫と年齢)	Kyōhei Suzuki	Kenichi Yamashita	Kyōhei Suzuki	May 24, 2024
8	"The Loner Middle Schooler"; Transliteration: "Botchi Chūgakusei" (Japanese: ぼっち中学生)	Kyōhei Suzuki	Kenichi Yamashita	Kyōhei Suzuki	May 24, 2024
Sosuke sees the chief of the agency Isao Kusanagi, who is also his father, putting in a request to formally adopt Sara as his daughter, passing her off as a child whose father was a minor at birth and her mother asked Sosuke to adopt her before passing away. Isao figures out that Sara is from another world after she tells the truth, and Isao decides to fulfill Sosuke's request and issue a birth certificate for Sara as Sosuke's biological daughter. That night, Sara goes over to Yuna's home for a sleepover and together they watch a movie. Afterwards, Sara tells Yuna that she is planning to enroll in school, while Yuna tells her that she is transferring to a public school and looks forward to seeing each other there. Meanwhile, Livia cooks grasshoppers for Noa and Puriketsu, and while Noa enjoys them, Puriketsu refuses to eat them. That night, Noa has a dream and from it comes up with the new band's name: Grasshopper the Savior. The next day, Sara tells Sosuke her birthday that actually makes her age 12 rather than 13 since in her world newborns start at age 1 rather than 0, making her too young for middle school and instead enrolls at an elementary school. On Yuna's first day at her new middle school, she is shocked to find out that Sara is not there and expresses her frustration in front of the class.
9	"The Demon Lord's Descendant Makes Her Grade School Debut"; Transliteration: "Maō no Matsuei, Shōgaku Debyū Suru" (Japanese: 魔王の末裔、小学デビューする)	Hisaya Takabayashi	Yomi Hirasaka	Hisaya Takabayashi	May 31, 2024
9	"Detective Awakening"; Transliteration: "Tantei no Mezame" (Japanese: 探偵の目覚め)	Hisaya Takabayashi	Yomi Hirasaka	Hisaya Takabayashi	May 31, 2024
Now going by the name Sara Kusanagi, Sara begins her first day at elementary school. Sara makes friends with four boys, known by the class as the "Four Hottie Kings", which draws the jealousy of her classmates Yayoi Yasunaga, Yoko Chikada, and Shikuza Tsuyama. The three attempt to prank Sara by locking her in the gym equipment shed, but Sara uses her magic to break out. The three beg Sara to be her "retainers" rather than just be friends, and Sara accepts their request. Meanwhile at middle school, Yuna overhears her classmate Mizuki Imahariyama getting bullied while inside the girls' restroom having recorded their conversation. The next day, Yuna tails Mizuki and asks her to explain her situation, learning that those three second-year students are basketball teammates who are upset that Mizuki was chosen to start over them. Using the same method Sosuke and Sara used to resolve her own bullying problem, Yuna agrees to help Mizuki resolve the situation. Yuna plants a hidden camera on the wall at the stairwell to get footage of Mizuki being bullied and sends it to Mizuki leaving it to her to decide what she wants to do next. After school, Yuna comes over to see Sara telling her that she's over the broken promise to attend school together, all while telling Sosuke that she wants to become a detective when she grows up.
10	"Multiplying Princesses"; Transliteration: "Zōshoku Suru Warawa" (Japanese: 増殖する妾)	Kenichirō Watanabe	Kenichi Yamashita	Kenichirō Watanabe	June 7, 2024
10	"Gambler Lady Knight"; Transliteration: "Asobinin Onna Kishi" (Japanese: 遊び人女騎士)	Kenichirō Watanabe	Kenichi Yamashita	Kenichirō Watanabe	June 7, 2024
10	"Friendship Between Girls (LOL)"; Transliteration: "Onna no Yūjō (Emi)" (Japanese: 女の友情（笑）)	Kenichirō Watanabe	Kenichi Yamashita	Kenichirō Watanabe	June 7, 2024
While walking on the way to school, the girls in Sara's class use "warawa" to address themselves rather than "watashi" after Sara has them believing all girls are princesses and that it is how princesses address themselves. Meanwhile, the prototype of Livia figures nears completion with production expected before Christmas. Livia tells Noa about wanting to gift a figure to Sara for Christmas. Afterwards, Noa pays Livia, and Livia gambles at a pachinko parlor heeding the advice from Kurinohara about being able to sense when a machine is about to deliver a big payout, but she loses. Livia runs into Takeo again and he tells her that pachinko is all luck-based and what Kurinohara said is false since he is still homeless. Livia tries to chase her losses at horse racing, but she loses again. In the meantime, Brenda is looking to marry Sosuke and become Sara's stepmother and pays Sosuke extra for completing his latest assignment. Afterwards, Brenda decides she wants to cook for Sosuke to impress him and asks Haruka to teach her to cook. That night, Yuna comes over to Sosuke's home and brings the family a meal. The next day, Brenda asks Sosuke to eat her homemade meat and potatoes dish, but Sosuke declines explaining that he has lots of leftovers of that same dish that Yuna brought over last night.
11	"Christmas in Gifu"; Transliteration: "Kurisumasu in Gifu" (Japanese: クリスマス IN 岐阜)	Fumio Maezono	Yomi Hirasaka	Tomoko Iwasaki	June 14, 2024 (Note: This episode aired at 1:43 a.m. JST, 15 minutes after the original air time on TBS.)
11	"The Princess and the Aquarium"; Transliteration: "Hime to Suizokukan" (Japanese: 姫と水族館)	Fumio Maezono	Yomi Hirasaka	Tomoko Iwasaki	June 14, 2024
11	"The Wicked Women's Challenge"; Transliteration: "Akujo-tachi no Chōsen" (Japanese: 悪女たちの挑戦)	Fumio Maezono	Yomi Hirasaka	Tomoko Iwasaki	June 14, 2024
11	"A Reunion Under the Bridge"; Transliteration: "Hashi no Shita no Saikai" (Japanese: 橋の下の再会)	Fumio Maezono	Yomi Hirasaka	Tomoko Iwasaki	June 14, 2024
On Christmas Eve, Sara returns home after attending several Christmas parties, and Livia arrives to give Sara a doll of herself as a present. However, Sara returns it after learning that it was made too realistic as Livia's actual hair was used. Livia returns home telling Noa to focus on the band. On the last day of winter break, Sosuke takes Sara to the aquarium as part of her winter break homework assignment, and then they eat at a conveyor belt sushi restaurant on the way back. Meanwhile, Noa and Puriketsu argue over how to write the songs as Puriketsu wants edgy lyrics, but what Noa wrote is deemed too creepy. With Valentine's Day coming, Brenda asks Haruka to help her make homemade chocolate. Wanting to make chocolate from scratch that they end up spending lots of money on ingredients and appliances, as well as time with the number of preparations involved that they took a day off work, and their first attempt at making chocolate ends up in failure. Sometime later, Suzuki, who is actually the bestselling author Akira Suzukiri that recently published a new book inspired by Livia's homeless life after a long hiatus, shows up at the agency looking for Livia not knowing that she was fired from that job. Suzuki goes out and finds Livia practicing the guitar under a bridge. Suzuki thanks Livia for giving him the motivation to return to Tokyo to resume his career as an author after he quit his job due to the amount of criticism he has been getting. Livia asks Suzuki to help write the lyrics. With his help, Noa and Puriketsu finish writing their new song.
12	"Valentine's in Gifu"; Transliteration: "Barentain in Gifu" (Japanese: バレンタインIN岐阜)	Masafumi Satō	Yomi Hirasaka	Kazumi Nonaka	June 21, 2024
12	"The Legend Begins"; Transliteration: "Densetsu no Hajimari" (Japanese: 伝説の始まり)	Masafumi Satō	Yomi Hirasaka	Kazumi Nonaka	June 21, 2024
12	"The Princess Graduates"; Transliteration: "Hime to Sotsugyōshiki" (Japanese: 姫と卒業式)	Masafumi Satō	Yomi Hirasaka	Kazumi Nonaka	June 21, 2024
12	"The Legend Ends"; Transliteration: "Densetsu no Owari" (Japanese: 伝説の終わり)	Masafumi Satō	Yomi Hirasaka	Kazumi Nonaka	June 21, 2024
12	"A Salad Bowl of Eccentrics"; Transliteration: "Henjin no Sarada Bōru" (Japanese: 変人のサラダボウル)	Masafumi Satō	Yomi Hirasaka	Kazumi Nonaka	June 21, 2024
On Valentine's Day, Sara gets lots of chocolates from her classmates and some homemade chocolates from Yuna. Brenda finally makes chocolates properly after taking a month off work to do so to give to Sosuke, only for Sosuke to decline due to the large amount Sara received. On the day of Grasshopper the Savior's debut performance Livia goes to the pachinko parlor to kill time. Just when she is about to get a big win, Livia realizes she lost track of time and hurries to the concert venue, and after a slight delay the band performs its debut concert, gaining instant popularity in Gifu and getting a record deal shortly afterwards. Spring arrives, and Sara graduates from elementary school and she puts on an idol concert at the graduation ceremony much to Sosuke's embarrassment. Meanwhile, after Grasshopper the Savior announced their major debut, Noa, whose real name is Noa Kinoshita, is arrested on suspicion of insider trading, putting the band's future in jeopardy. The next day, Brenda greets Noa in custody having been hired to be her lawyer, all while despite the band being suddenly broken up, Livia shows her resiliency. Sosuke starts working on Noa's case knowing that he's helping out a friend and reflects on how much he enjoys interacting with the eccentrics in Gifu.

== Reception ==
In the 2023 edition of Takarajimasha's annual light novel guide book Kono Light Novel ga Sugoi!, A Salad Bowl of Eccentrics ranked 22nd in the bunkobon category, and 11th in the new work category.

== See also ==
- Salad bowl (cultural idea)
