= Yomi Hirasaka =

Japanese novelist

- 平坂読
- Born: Gifu Prefecture, Japan
- Occupation: Novelist
- Writing career
- Period: 2004–2026
- Genre: Light novel
- Notable works: Haganai; A Sister's All You Need; A Salad Bowl of Eccentrics
- Notable awards: (2004) 1st MF Bunko J Light Novel Rookie Award of Excellence (Haunted)
- Website: 平坂読web yellow spring

Yomi Hirasaka (平坂読, Hirasaka Yomi) is a former Japanese writer, best known for his light novels and manga series Haganai and A Sister's All You Need. His pseudonym is derived from Yomotsu Hirasaka.

== Career ==
Hirasaka's works are primarily described as romantic comedies with slice of life elements, which feature a mismatched ensemble cast that gradually finds common ground.

Upon winning the first MF Bunko J Light Novel Rookie Award of Excellence in 2004, Hirasaka debuted professionally with the novel Haunted! (ホーンテッド!).

His series Ranobe-bu (ラノベ部) reached first place in the Kono Light Novel poll in 2010 as voted by light novel fans while Haganai (僕は友達が少ない), Hirasaka's most successful work, reached second place in the same poll the following year.

Haganai, which debuted in August 2009 and ran through August 2015, later became the best-selling light novel in 2011; it received an anime adaption the same year. The series saw several light novel spin-offs that further expanded upon the story and its characters. The series was also adapted into two manga series that ran from 2010 to 2020 and a live-action film in 2014. A visual novel video game based on the series was released for PlayStation Portable.

Hirasaka's follow-up work, A Sister's All You Need (妹さえいればいい), debuted in March 2015 under Shogakukan's Gagaga Bunko label and concluded in February 2020; it received an anime adaptation in 2017.

Hirasaka's most recent running work, the comedy reverse isekai series A Salad Bowl of Eccentrics, debuted in October 2021, under the Shogakukan's Gagaga Bunko label. The series was adapted into an anime in 2024.

On September 13, Hirasaka announced his retirement as a light novelist. He revealed that his decision to retire was due to him achieving financial independence through the FIRE ("Financial Independence, Retire Early") movement.

== Works ==
=== Light novels ===
- Haunted! (ホーンテッド!) (Illustrated by Yū Katase, published by MF Bunko J, 4 volumes, 2004–2005)
- Sora ni Usagi ga Noboru Koro (ソラにウサギがのぼるころ) (Illustrated by Hiromu Minato, published by MF Bunko J, 4 volumes, 2006)
- Nekuroma (ねくろま。) (Illustrated by Jirō, published by MF Bunko J, 6 volumes, 2007–2008)
  - Nekuroma Infinity (ねくろま。∞（インフィニティ）) (Illustrated by Jirō, published by MF Bunko J, April 2009, ISBN 9784840118736)
- Ranobe-bu (ラノベ部) (Illustrated by Yōta, published by MF Bunko J, 3 volumes, 2008–2009)
- Maria Holic Anthology (まりあ†ほりっくアンソロジー) (Original story by Minari Endō, published by MF Bunko J, March 2009, ISBN 9784840127165)
- Haganai (僕は友達が少ない) (Illustrated by Buriki, published by MF Bunko J, 11 volumes, 2009–2015)
  - Boku wa Tomodachi ga Sukunai CONNECT (僕は友達が少ないCONNECT) (Illustrated by Buriki, published by MF Bunko J, December 2012, ISBN 9784840143653)
- A Sister's All You Need (妹さえいればいい。) (Illustrated by Kantoku, published by Gagaga Bunko, 14 volumes, 2015–2020)
- Shimekiri Mae Niwa Yuri ga Hakadoru (〆切前には百合が捗る) (Illustrated by U35, published by GA Bunko, December 2020, ISBN 9784815608088)
- A Salad Bowl of Eccentrics (変人のサラダボウル) (Illustrated by Kantoku, published by Gagaga Bunko, 8 volumes, 2021–2026)

=== Manga ===
- Sekigan no Shōnen Occult Maiden ~Kageshō~ (隻眼ノ少年 オカルトメイデン〜影章〜) (Illustrated by Chado, published in Young Gangan, 2 volumes, 2014)
- Occult Maiden Yōshō Oni o tsugu Shōnen (オカルトメイデン 陽章 鬼を継ぐ少年) (Illustrated by Hiroichi, published in Monthly Comic Alive, 1 volume, 2013–2015)

=== Game scenarios ===
- Occult Maiden (オカルトメイデン) (Developed by Square Enix, November 2013)
- Chain Chronicle (チェインクロニクル) (Developed by Sega)
  - Media Factory Collaboration Scenario (2014)
  - Kadokawa Collaboration Scenario (2016)

=== Tabletop RPG performance ===
- Grancrest Replay Live Series Live Factory (グランクレスト・リプレイ ライブシリーズ ライブ・ファクトリー) (Authored by Shunsaku Yano, published by Fujimi Dragon Book, 2014)

=== Music ===
2011

- FLOWER (Lyrics)

2013

- Be My Friend (Lyrics)
- 僕らの翼 (Lyrics)
- ブレス (Lyrics)
- FANTASISTA (Lyrics)
- 君と僕 (Lyrics)

=== Anime ===
- Haganai Season 2 (Series composition)
- A Sister's All You Need (Series composition, screenwriting)
- A Salad Bowl of Eccentrics (Series composition)
