= A Sister's All You Need =

Japanese light novel series and its franchise

- First light novel volume cover

妹さえいればいい。 (Imōto Sae Ireba Ii)
- Genre: Romantic comedy
- Light novel
- Written by: Yomi Hirasaka
- Illustrated by: Kantoku
- Published by: Shogakukan
- English publisher: NA: Yen Press
- Imprint: Gagaga Bunko
- Original run: March 18, 2015 – February 18, 2020
- Volumes: 14
- Manga

Imōto Sae Ireba Ii @comic
- Written by: Yomi Hirasaka
- Illustrated by: Idu
- Published by: Shogakukan
- Magazine: Monthly Sunday Gene-X
- Original run: December 19, 2015 – July 19, 2019
- Volumes: 9
- Manga

Imōto Sae Ireba Ii Gaiden: Imōto ni Saenareba Ii!
- Written by: Yomi Hirasaka
- Illustrated by: Kobashiko
- Published by: Square Enix
- Magazine: Gangan Joker
- Original run: October 22, 2016 – February 22, 2018
- Volumes: 3
- Anime television series
- Directed by: Shin Oonuma; Jin Tamamura (Note: Credited with Series Direction (シリーズディレクター))
- Produced by: Terushige Yoshie; Hayato Kaneko; Tomoyuki Ōwada; Yūichi Izumi; Tarō Tanaka; Atsushi Chiku; Yoshimasa Okunaga; Kazuyoshi Nishikawa
- Written by: Yomi Hirasaka
- Music by: Tomoki Kikuya
- Studio: Silver Link
- Licensed by: Crunchyroll (streaming); SA/SEA: Muse Communication
- Original network: Tokyo MX, KBS, Sun TV, BS11, AT-X
- Original run: October 8, 2017 – December 24, 2017
- Episodes: 12
- icon

A Sister's All You Need (Japanese: 妹さえいればいい。, Hepburn: Imōto Sae Ireba Ii) is a Japanese light novel series written by Yomi Hirasaka and illustrated by Kantoku. Fourteen volumes were published by Shogakukan under their Gagaga Bunko imprint from March 2015 to February 2020. Two manga adaptations have been published by Shogakukan and Square Enix. A 12-episode anime television series adaptation by Silver Link aired from October to December 2017.

== Plot ==
The story follows the novelist Itsuki Hashima who is surrounded by various people, including a beautiful genius writer who loves him, a big-sisterly college classmate, a fellow male writer, a sadistic tax accountant, and his editor. As the story progresses, the underlying conflicts of dreams and goals surface, as each character attempts to achieve their dreams, in their own way. One such example is the rivalry between author Itsuki and his friend Haruto. Itsuki's stories are driven by a passion for stories about little sisters with praise from a selective yet strongly supportive fan-base, whereas Haruto's stories are driven by victory and romance through more common, yet popular cliches. Each of their stories is riddled with common light novel themes and concepts, such as romantic comedy elements and erotic illustrations. They are all looked after by Itsuki's younger "brother" Chihiro, who in fact is his younger stepsister.

== Characters ==
Itsuki Hashima (羽島 伊月, Hashima Itsuki)
Voiced by: Yūsuke Kobayashi (Japanese); Stephen Fu (English)
Itsuki is a 20-year-old author who has an obsession towards younger sisters. He is a novelist who debuted when he was in high school; all of his novels feature younger sisters as the heroine. In the span of five years, he has published 20 books, some of which have ranked in the top 10 weekly rankings for light novels on Oricon. Despite his success, his irrational personality and writing style has led to mediocre ratings compared to his fellow writers. His relationship with his father became worse when his father remarried Chihiro's mother only three years after Itsuki's mother died. He is in love with Nayuta, and towards the end of the series, he proposes to her. The series ends with him being married to Nayuta and them having a son named Sora.
Chihiro Hashima (羽島 千尋, Hashima Chihiro)
Voiced by: Nozomi Yamamoto (Japanese); Arielle O'Neil (English)
Chihiro appears as Itsuki's younger stepbrother, but Chihiro is actually a girl. She is a dependable person who looks after everyone around her. The reason why she hides her real gender is because their father thought she was in danger when he found out about Itsuki's obsession during his novel debut. She hides her true identity only in front of Itsuki and his acquaintances. Her main hobby throughout the series is housekeeping. Her true identity as a girl is revealed between volume 9 and volume 10, after an unintentional insult made by Nayuta.
Nayuta Kani (可児 那由多, Kani Nayuta)
Voiced by: Hisako Kanemoto (Japanese); Jamie Marchi (English)
Nayuta is an 18-year-old genius novelist who debuted after she won a newcomer prize. Nayuta Kani is her pseudonym and at first even Itsuki does not know her real name. She cannot write if she is not naked, has a slight obsession with personal nudity, and she likes dirty jokes. Starting in junior high school, she refused to go to school after getting bullied. After reading Itsuki's novel, she falls in love with him and will not hesitate to show it. She is also part-Russian. It is later revealed that her real name is Kazuko Honden (本田 和子, Honden Kazuko). At the end of the series, she is married to Itsuki and is pregnant with their first child.
Miyako Shirakawa (白川 京, Shirakawa Miyako)
Voiced by: Risa Taneda (1st drama CD), Ai Kakuma (2nd drama CD & anime) (Japanese); Sara Ragsdale (English)
Miyako is Itsuki's classmate at college who at first had a bad first impression of him. While Miyako does not understand Itsuki's stories, she became his fashion advisor to help him with his novel. After Itsuki dropped out of college, Miyako still comes to see him. She has feelings for Itsuki but decided to support Nayuta instead. She is good friends with Nayuta and seems to be getting dragged into the latter's obsession with personal nudity.
Haruto Fuwa (不破 春斗, Fuwa Haruto)
Voiced by: Satoshi Hino (Japanese); Alejandro Saab (English)
Haruto is another novelist who debuted around the same time as Itsuki. Despite his cool appearance, he loves maid characters and owns a lot of adult games and figurines. Haruto has a "persona" in his social media to gain fans for his novel and to increase his series' popularity. He has a younger sister (Voiced by: Kaori Mizuhashi (Japanese); Kristen McGuire (English)) whom he thought is harsh to him, but is actually a sister who cannot be honest. His light novel series got a poorly-adapted anime because it was used as a tool for newcomer voice actors with no ability. In the middle of his shock, Miyako encouraged him and his hard work. He gained a crush on Miyako, however he found out about her feelings for Itsuki and decided to "keep going on his pace."
Setsuna Ena (恵那 刹那, Ena Setsuna)
Voiced by: Tsubasa Yonaga (Japanese); Stephen Sanders (English)
Setsuna is a 16-year-old illustrator who goes under the pen name "Puriketsu" (ぷりけつ). Setsuna was in charge of illustrating Itsuki's novels until Itsuki decided to stop because he thought his series is not worthy enough for Setsuna's art and asked him to wait until he is worthy enough. He dresses in Harajuku fashion and has an easygoing personality, even on deadlines. He has a butt fetish.
Ashley Ono (大野 アシュリー, Ōno Ashurī)
Voiced by: Manami Numakura (Japanese); Amber Lee Connors (English)
Ashley is a 32-year-old tax accountant who wears lolita fashion. She is reliable but sadistic; she makes her clients reveal their fetishes through their expenses, but raises their tax return in exchange. She is currently the only one among Itsuki's acquaintances who knows about Chihiro's real identity.
Kenjiro Toki (土岐 健次郎, Toki Kenjirō)
Voiced by: Kōsuke Toriumi (Japanese); Eric Vale (English)
Kenjiro is an editor at GF Bunko who is in charge of Itsuki's works. He looks like a typical office worker and is often seen drunk when overly stressed with his job, particularly when it comes to Itsuki and Setsuna's deadlines.
Kaiko Mikuniyama (三国山 蚕, Mikuniyama Kaiko)
Voiced by: Akane Fujita (Japanese); Jad Saxton (English)
Kaiko is an artist who is in charge of adapting Itsuki's novel Imōto no Subete (妹のすべて; The A to Z of Little Sisters) (Mahō Gakuen (妹法(まほう)学園) in the anime) into a manga. Her drawing skill level is so high that Itsuki becomes moved after seeing her works, despite her being a newcomer. She has an underwear fetish and refuses to draw a completely naked person, however then later changes her mind thanks to Nayuta. The ribbon she wears on her head is actually a pair of panties; she will wear them on her face before she draws.

== Media ==
=== Light novels ===
A Sister's All You Need is written by Yomi Hirasaka and illustrated by Kantoku. Shogakukan published the first volume on March 18, 2015, under their Gagaga Bunko imprint. The limited editions of volumes 4 and 7 include a drama CD.

Yen Press have licensed the novels in North America. The English version is translated by Kevin Gifford.

No.	Original release date	Original ISBN	English release date	English ISBN
1	March 18, 2015	978-4-09-451507-7	May 22, 2018	978-1-9753-2642-5
2	July 17, 2015	978-4-09-451560-2	September 18, 2018	978-1-9753-5359-9
3	November 18, 2015	978-4-09-451580-0	January 22, 2019	978-1-9753-5360-5
4	March 18, 2016	978-4-09-451598-5; 978-4-09-451597-8 (LE)	May 21, 2019	978-1-9753-5361-2
5	July 20, 2016	978-4-09-451618-0	October 15, 2019	978-1-9753-5975-1
6	December 20, 2016	978-4-09-451646-3	January 28, 2020	978-1-9753-5976-8
7	May 18, 2017	978-4-09-451677-7; 978-4-09-451676-0 (LE)	June 23, 2020	978-1-9753-5977-5
8	September 20, 2017	978-4-09-451697-5	November 3, 2020	978-1-9753-1643-3
9	February 20, 2018	978-4-09-451719-4	March 2, 2021	978-1-9753-1644-0
10	July 18, 2018	978-4-09-451742-2	June 29, 2021	978-1-9753-1645-7
11	December 18, 2018	978-4-09-451765-1; 978-4-09-451764-4 (LE)	October 26, 2021	978-1-9753-1647-1
12	April 18, 2019	978-4-09-451782-8	May 24, 2022	978-1-9753-1648-8
13	September 18, 2019	978-4-09-451808-5	September 20, 2022	978-1-9753-1649-5
14	February 18, 2020	978-4-09-451828-3	February 21, 2023	978-1-9753-1646-4

=== Manga ===
A manga adaptation, titled Imōto Sae Ireba Ii @comic and illustrated by Idu, was serialized in Shogakukan's Monthly Sunday Gene-X magazine from December 19, 2015, to July 19, 2019. Shogakukan collected its chapters in nine tankōbon volumes, released from May 19, 2016, to October 18, 2019.

No.	Release date	ISBN
1	May 19, 2016	978-4-09-157448-0
2	November 18, 2016	978-4-09-157465-7
3	May 19, 2017	978-4-09-157485-5
4	September 20, 2017	978-4-09-157499-2
5	February 19, 2018	978-4-09-157514-2
6	August 17, 2018	978-4-09-157538-8
7	February 19, 2019	978-4-09-157559-3
8	June 19, 2019	978-4-09-157566-1
9	October 18, 2019	978-4-09-157576-0

A spin-off manga by Kobashiko, titled Imōto Sae Ireba Ii Gaiden: Imōto ni Sae Nareba Ii! (妹さえいればいい。外伝 妹にさえなればいい!), was serialized in Square Enix's Gangan Joker from October 22, 2016, to February 22, 2018.

No.	Release date	ISBN
1	May 18, 2017	978-4-7575-5341-5
2	September 20, 2017	978-4-7575-5472-6
3	February 20, 2018	978-4-7575-5632-4

=== Anime ===
An anime television series adaptation, directed by Shin Oonuma and produced by Silver Link, aired from October 8 to December 24, 2017. Author Yomi Hirasaka wrote the scripts, Sumie Kinoshita designed the characters, and Tomoki Kikuya composed the music. The opening theme song "Ashita no Kimi Sae Ireba Ii" (明日の君さえいればいい。; transl. As Long as You're Here Tomorrow) was performed by ChouCho, while the ending theme song "Donna Hoshizora yori mo, Donna Omoide yori mo" (どんな星空よりも、どんな思い出よりも) was performed by Aira Yūki. Crunchyroll streamed the series with Funimation produced an English dub. Following Sony's acquisition of Crunchyroll, the series was moved to Crunchyroll. Muse Communication licensed the series in South and Southeast Asia.

A series of six short episodes, titled ** Sae Ireba Ii (○○さえいればいい。) were uploaded to the anime's official Twitter account, following the broadcast of the anime television series, from October 9 to December 10, 2017. Each episode is two minutes long with super deformed characters.

No.	Title (Note: All English titles are taken from Crunchyroll.)	Original release date
1	"I Only Need a Little Brother Who Can Cook, a Beautiful Naked Girl, and Friends I Can Relate To." "Ryōri Jōzu no Otōto to Zenra no Bishōjo to Ki no Au Tomodachi Sae Ireba Ii" (Japanese: 料理上手の弟と全裸の美少女と気の合う友達さえいればいい。)	October 8, 2017
After the draft for a new work is rejected by his editor, Kenjirō Toki, light novel author Itsuki Hashima hangs out at his home with his stepbrother Chihiro Hashima, his former collegemate Miyako Shirakawa and fellow authors Nayuta Kani and Haruto Fuwa.
2	"If Only a Miracle Would Happen." "Kiseki Sae Okireba Ii" (Japanese: 奇跡さえ起きればいい。)	October 15, 2017
After paying a visit to Itsuki, Nayuta and Miyako talk about how they met him and became his friends.
3	"As Long as It's Research" "Shuzai de Sae Areba Ii" (Japanese: 取材でさえあればいい。)	October 22, 2017
Out of inspirations for the latest volume of his series, Itsuki travels to Okinawa with Nayuta and Miyako, and then is dragged to Hokkaido along another of his friends, the illustrator Setsuna Ena.
4	"As Long as You're Working." "Shigoto Sae Sureba Ii" (Japanese: 仕事さえすればいい。)	October 29, 2017
As the deadline for the volume approaches Itsuki accepts Haruto's suggestion to hire tax accountant Ashley Ono in order to increase his tax returns, unaware of her sadistic nature.
5	"All You Need is to Write Novels." "Shōsetsu Sae Kakeba Ii" (Japanese: 小説さえ書けばいい。)	November 5, 2017
The deadline is at hand and Itsuki is hunted down by Kenjirō, who declares that he will not let him go until he delivers his work.
6	"Having Your Media Developments Go Well Is All You Need." "Media Tenkai Sae Umaku Ikebai Ii" (Japanese: メディア展開さえ上手くいけばいい。)	November 12, 2017
After celebrating the upcoming manga adaptation of his light novel, Itsuki gather his friends to watch the debut of the anime adaptation of Haruto's own work, but things do not turn out as expected.
7	"Adventure Is All You Need." "Bōken Sae Areba Ii" (Japanese: 冒険さえあればいい。)	November 19, 2017
With Haruto still in dismay due to the negative reception of the anime series, Itsuki invites him, Chihiro, Nayuta and Miyako to his house for an RPG session.
8	"All You Need is Love and Friendship." "Koi to Yūjō Sae Areba Ii" (Japanese: 恋と友情さえあればいい。)	November 26, 2017
Finishing their RPG session, Haruto admits to Itsuki about his love for Miyako, with Itsuki promising to help Haruto with his relationship. In the end, though, Haruto realizes that Miyako loves Itsuki and calls their deal off.
9	"Nudity and Underwear are All You Need." "Zenra to Shitagi Sae Areba Ii" (Japanese: 全裸と下着さえあればいい。)	December 3, 2017
Itsuki has a rather serious divergence regarding the manga adaptation of his novel with the illustrator, Mikuniyama, and his friends step in to settle the dispute in the most unusual ways.
10	"A Lack of Problems Is All You Need." "Nayami Sae Nakereba Ii" (Japanese: 悩みさえなければいい。)	December 10, 2017
The story of how Itsuki lost his mother and his father's remarriage with Chihiro's mother created a rift between them is revealed, as well as Chihiro's true nature that only Itsuki and his friends are unaware of. Haruto ironically also begins to understand Itsuki's opinion on little sisters.
11	"Becoming the Protagonist Is All You Need." "Shujinkō ni Sae Nareba Ii" (Japanese: 主人公にさえなればいい。)	December 17, 2017
After Itsuki and Nayuta deliver their manuscripts, they and their friends gather for another board game session at Itsuki's apartment. Later that night, Itsuki reveals to Haruto his true feelings for Nayuta, and the reason why he does not follow them, but what does not know is that she was awake and listened to what he said. In the end scene, it is revealed that his light novel is green lit for an anime adaptation.
12	"A Sister's All You Need?" "Imōto Sae Ireba Ii?" (Japanese: 妹さえいればいい？)	December 24, 2017
More details about Itsuki's past are revealed, including the origin of his obsession with little sisters. Itsuki also learns that his light novel will also be adapted into an anime series; despite the prospect of it failing as strongly as the series based on Haruto's work, Itsuki is still determined to attain his longtime dream of being the protagonist of his own life and begins work on the project. Another board game is played.
