= Buriki =

Japanese artist

- ブリキ
- Occupations: Illustrator, character designer
- Known for: Boku wa Tomodachi ga Sukunai; Ground Control to Psychoelectric Girl; Nagi-Asu: A Lull in the Sea

Buriki (ブリキ) is a Japanese illustrator currently living in Osaka Prefecture. He is the illustrator of the light novel series Boku wa Tomodachi ga Sukunai and Ground Control to Psychoelectric Girl. In 2012, he won the Kono Light Novel ga Sugoi! award as best illustrator.

Carl Kimlinger of Anime News Network called Buriki's character designs for the Haganai anime "delectable in close".

== Works ==
=== Illustrations ===
==== Light novels ====
- Boku wa Tomodachi ga Sukunai - Yomi Hirasaka (2009, MF Bunko J)
- Ground Control to Psychoelectric Girl - Hitoma Iruma (2009, Dengeki Bunko)
- Makai Tantei Meiōsei 0: Walking no W - Matarō Echizen (2010, Dengeki Bunko)
- Tokage no Ō - Hitoma Iruma (2011, Dengeki Bunko)
- Sentōki Shōjo Chronicle - Takuma Rurimaru (2015, Dengeki Bunko)
- Oresuki - Rakuda (2016, Dengeki Bunko)
- Shine Post: Nee Shitteta? Watashi o Zettai Idol ni Suru Tame no, Goku Futsū de Atarimae na, to Bikkiri no Mahou - Rakuda (2021, Dengeki Bunko)

==== Adult light novels ====
- Taima Kyōshi Nozomi Aya: Gakuen no Gakuen - Yūki Amato (2014, Nijigen Dream Bunko)
- Tsunpuri Aishite Ohime-sama - Misora Kanzaki (2009, Nijigen Dream Bunko)

=== Character design ===
==== Anime ====
- Nagi-Asu: A Lull in the Sea
