= Kantoku (illustrator) =

Japanese illustrator and character designer

- カントク (監督)
- Born: March 26, 1985 (age 41); Hyogo Prefecture
- Education: Tokyo Denki University
- Occupations: Illustrator; character designer
- Known for: Magical Suite Prism Nana, The "Hentai" Prince and the Stony Cat.

Kantoku (カントク; born March 26, 1985) is a Japanese illustrator and character designer. He was born in Hyogo Prefecture and lives in Saitama Prefecture.

== Profile ==
The word "kantoku" literally means "director" in Japanese. He got his pen name during university days where he was told that his method of teaching was "like an indecent (movie) director."

== Works ==
=== Illustrations ===
==== Light novels ====
- Matte te, Fujimori-kun! - Karuta Ichijō (2006, Fujimi Mystery Bunko)
- The "Hentai" Prince and the Stony Cat. - Sō Sagara (2010, MF Bunko J)
- Boku wa Tomodachi ga Sukunai Universe (anthology novel, cover illustration) - Yomi Hirasaka (2011, MF Bunko J)
- Shinkyoku Sōkai Polyphonica Aphonic Songbird - Ichirō Sakaki (2012, GA Bunko)
- A Sister's All You Need - Yomi Hirasaka (2015, Gagaga Bunko)
- Sonna Sekai wa Kowashite Shimae: Qualidea Code - Sō Sagara (2015, MF Bunko J)
- Märchen Mädchen - Tomohiro Matsu & StoryWorks (2017, Dash X Bunko)
- A Salad Bowl of Eccentrics - Yomi Hirasaka (2021, Gagaga Bunko)
- Sasaki and Peeps - Buncololi (2021, MF Bunko J)

==== Visual novels ====
- Angel Breath (2006, Giga)
- Ame Sarasa ~Ame to, Fushigi na Kimi ni, Koi o Suru~ (2007, CUFFS)
- Natsu no Ame (2009, CUBE)
- Your Diary (2011, CUBE)
- The "Hentai" Prince and the Stony Cat. (2013, C-Territory)
- Koi Suru Kanojo no Bukiyou na Butai (2014, CUBE)
- Kami-sama no You na Kimi e (2020, CUBE)

==== Others ====
- Comic Market 84 catalog cover illustration

=== Character designs ===
==== Anime ====
- Garakowa: Restore the World
- One Room

==== Video games ====
- Ange Vierge
- Chain Chronicle - Lantocarte's design

==== Others ====
- 22/7 (Original Character Design for Sakura Fujima)
- Comi-Po! (manga-maker software)
- Magical Suite Prism Nana (pachislo machine)
