= Haganai =

Japanese light novel series and franchise

- First light novel volume cover, featuring Kodaka Hasegawa (left) and Yozora Mikazuki (right)

僕は友達が少ない (Boku wa Tomodachi ga Sukunai)
- Genre: Comedy; Harem; Slice of life
- Light novel
- Written by: Yomi Hirasaka
- Illustrated by: Buriki
- Published by: Media Factory
- Imprint: MF Bunko J
- Original run: August 31, 2009 – August 25, 2015
- Volumes: 11
Further information
Manga
Haganai: I Don't Have Many Friends
Written by	Yomi Hirasaka
Illustrated by	Itachi
Published by	Media Factory
English publisher	NA: Seven Seas Entertainment
Magazine	Monthly Comic Alive
Original run	March 27, 2010 – December 26, 2020
Volumes	20
Manga
Boku wa Tomodachi ga Sukunai+
Written by	Misaki Harukawa
Illustrated by	Shouichi Taguchi
Published by	Shueisha
Magazine	Jump SQ.19
Original run	November 19, 2010 – June 19, 2012
Volumes	2
Original video animation
Directed by	Hisashi Saitō
Written by	Tatsuhiko Urahata
Music by	Tom-H@ck
Studio	AIC Build
Released	September 22, 2011
Runtime	12 minutes
Anime television series
Directed by	Hisashi Saitō
Written by	Tatsuhiko Urahata
Music by	Tom-H@ck
Studio	AIC Build
Licensed by	Crunchyroll (Note: In North America through Crunchyroll, LLC (formerly Funimation).); AUS: Madman Entertainment
Original network	TBS, MBS
English network	NA: Funimation Channel; SEA: Animax Asia
Original run	October 7, 2011 – December 23, 2011
Episodes	12
Light novel
Boku wa Tomodachi ga Sukunai Universe
Written by	Various authors
Illustrated by	Various illustrators
Published by	Media Factory
Imprint	MF Bunko J
Original run	November 23, 2011 – February 22, 2013
Volumes	2
Video game
Boku wa Tomodachi ga Sukunai Portable
Publisher	Namco Bandai
Genre	Visual novel
Platform	PlayStation Portable
Released	February 23, 2012
Original video animation
Boku wa Tomodachi ga Sukunai Add On Disc
Directed by	Hisashi Saitō
Written by	Tatsuhiko Urahata
Music by	Tom-H@ck
Studio	AIC Build
Released	September 26, 2012
Runtime	25 minutes
Light novel
Boku wa Tomodachi ga Sukunai CONNECT
Written by	Yomi Hirasaka
Illustrated by	Buriki
Published by	Media Factory
Imprint	MF Bunko J
Published	December 25, 2012
Anime television series
Haganai NEXT
Directed by	Toru Kitahata
Written by	Yomi Hirasaka
Music by	Tom-H@ck
Studio	AIC Build
Licensed by	Crunchyroll; AUS: Madman Entertainment
Original network	TBS, MBS
English network	SEA: Animax Asia
Original run	January 11, 2013 – March 29, 2013
Episodes	12
Live-action film
Directed by	Takurō Oikawa
Written by	Takurō Oikawa
Studio	Toei
Released	February 1, 2014
Runtime	114 minutes
- icon

Haganai (はがない), short for Boku wa Tomodachi ga Sukunai (僕は友達が少ない; loosely "I Don't Have Many Friends"), (Note: The abbreviation "Haganai" is defined in the author's afterword in the first light novel. Hirasaka noted starting to call it by that title, and that it has somehow become the official title.) is a Japanese light novel series written by Yomi Hirasaka, illustrated by Buriki, and published by Media Factory, with 11 volumes released from August 2009 to August 2015. It has been given several manga adaptations; the first incarnation, its title and basic plot unchanged, began serialization in 2010; it was written and illustrated by Itachi and published in Monthly Comic Alive. A retelling of the series, written by Misaki Harukawa and illustrated by Shuichi Taguchi and called Boku wa Tomodachi ga Sukunai+ was published in Jump SQ.19. A 12-episode anime adaptation by AIC Build aired in Japan between October and December 2011. An original video animation episode was released in September 2012. A second anime season, Haganai NEXT, aired between January and March 2013. A live-action film adaptation was released in February 2014.

== Conception ==
Yomi Hirasaka had been working on Light Novel Club (ラノベ部, Ranobe-bu), which consisted of short stories about everyday life. In developing Boku wa Tomodachi ga Sukunai, or Haganai for short, Hirasaka contrasts the main characters as opposites of the ones in the Light Novel Club which had good relationships to begin with. Hirasaka drew influences from personal experience: "This novel is a story about myself who also had few friends, bad communication skills, negative thinking, lacking life experiences and useless delusional habits." Hirasaka also considers the setting of the stories to be less restrictive. The anime was directed by Hisashi Saito, who had previously directed the fan service romantic comedy Heaven's Lost Property. Hirasaka noted that Itachi's portrayal of the characters in the manga are "all so cute" and "their faces are full of life", especially the expressions of the heroines Yozora and Sena.^{Vol. 1}

== Plot ==
Kodaka Hasegawa, a transfer student to St. Chronica's Academy, has found it difficult to make friends because of his mix of brown-blond hair (inherited from his deceased English mother) and fierce-looking eyes that make him look like a delinquent. One day, he accidentally comes across the equally solitary and very abrasive Yozora Mikazuki as she converses with "Tomo", her "air" (imaginary) friend. Realizing that they lack social lives and skills, they decide that the best way to improve their situation is to form the Neighbors Club (隣人部, Rinjin-bu), "an after-school club for people with no friends like themselves". Other students with various backgrounds join the club: Sena Kashiwazaki is an attractive but arrogant idol who has no female friends and treats the boys as her slaves; Yukimura Kusunoki is an effeminate underclassman who idolizes Kodaka and strives to become manly like him; Rika Shiguma is a genius scientist with a perverted mind; Kobato Hasegawa is Kodaka's little sister who generally cosplays as a vampire; and Maria Takayama, a ten-year-old foul-mouthed nun who serves as the club's advisor. The story follows their adventures as the club tries out various school and outside social activities as practice for making friends.

== Characters ==
=== Neighbors Club ===
- Kodaka Hasegawa (羽瀬川 小鷹, Hasegawa Kodaka) is the viewpoint character of the light novels; he is a transfer student who has been unable to make friends in his first month at St. Chronica's.^{LN 1} He and Yozora Mikazuki start the Neighbors Club with the purpose of learning how to make friends and how to act in social situations. He has a gentle and balanced personality; but his unusual spotty-blond hair color, inherited from his late English mother, leads classmates to assume he is a violent and abusive delinquent and to spread defamatory rumors about him.^{LN 1}^{,}^{Ch. 6, 10} Because of his reputation, Kodaka has become accustomed to conflicts and having to defend himself.^{LN 1} Prior to the series, Kodaka often had to move because of his father's work as an archeologist. He has few memories related to home life, and no friends besides a single childhood friend from ten years previous, whose name eludes him at first.^{LN 1} He later discovers that his friend 'Sora', whom he thought to be a boy, is in fact Yozora.^{Ch. 28, 29} He does not show any romantic intentions towards anyone in the club until Sena's confession, which prompts him to reveal that he has been in love with her since their first meeting.^{LN 9} Correction: In LN 12 Chapter 51–53, Kodaka/Sena's father is under the impression that Kodaka and Sena are in a relationship and asks how they are progressing, and Kodaka seriously denies this in front of the group. Sena explains to Kodaka in private that she may have misled her father by exclaiming that with the Wonderland tickets she will be able to make Kobato her younger sister, and also tells Kodaka that their fathers betrothed them before they were old enough to remember. It was "a formal contract with their thumbprints and everything". They both smile. Kodaka then says his dad probably doesn't remember, because he wasn't told any of this, and it doesn't matter anymore because "that was when we were kids". Neither confess. When Sena and Kodaka return to the group, they try to keep a low profile but are eventually confronted with the question whether they are engaged. They do not respond, but Yozora is already questioning Rika which is closer - childhood friends or a betrothed couple. Kodaka thinks to himself that this is too cruel to Yozora. They both then say the engagement doesn't matter and to get back to the club's activity - filming. Kodaka is voiced by Ryōhei Kimura, and by Jerry Jewell in English. For the live-action film, he is portrayed by Kōji Seto.
- Yozora Mikazuki (三日月 夜空, Mikazuki Yozora) is a black-haired girl who is described as not having much going for her other than her looks.^{Vol. 3} She is a gifted student who often argues with Sena, who consistently scores better than she does on their exams. Yozora is verbally abusive towards people in general, not to mention the other members of the Neighbors Club,^{Ch. 12} especially Yukimura, whom she fools into working for the club as a crossdressing cosplay maid. (Note: The only one spared this treatment is Rika, since Rika takes whatever insult she gives her and deflects it back with a dirty joke that leaves her tired.^{Ch. 5}) Ten years prior to the start of the series, she and Kodaka ("Taka") were childhood friends, but because she had short hair and wore a cap, Taka mistook her for a boy and called her "Sora".^{Ch. 28} The day before he moved away, she wore a skirt to reveal the fact that she was a girl, but was too embarrassed to meet with him.^{Ch. 29} Kodaka was going to tell her of his imminent departure at the meeting, but since it did not happen, it appeared to Yozora that she had been abandoned, thus exacerbating her distrust of others. At the start of the series, she recognizes Kodaka as her childhood friend. When Kodaka discovers her talking to her imaginary friend "Tomo-chan", she creates the Neighbors Club in order to renew their friendship.^{Vol. 7} Kodaka does not recognize her as Sora until later in the story after she cuts her hair short.^{Ch. 28} In the anime, Yozora is voiced by Marina Inoue in Japanese and by Whitney Rodgers in English. In the live-action film, she is portrayed by Kie Kitano.
- Sena Kashiwazaki (柏崎 星奈, Kashiwazaki Sena) is a blonde-haired girl who is described as "perfect in every way except for her personality."^{Vol. 3} The daughter of the school's chairman, Sena shows a dislike of all things ordinary. She is both attractive and academically successful, but her arrogance precludes her from making female friends, and she treats her male classmates as slaves.^{,}^{LN 1}^{,}^{Ch. 2} She enjoys playing video games,^{LN 1}^{,}^{Ch. 3, 4} particularly bishoujo (games where the main character tries to win over a girl) because they allow her to make female (if virtual) friends,^{Ch. 4} although some of the games have embarrassing adult content.^{Ch. 7, 15} She does not get along with Yozora, who calls her "Meat" (肉, Niku). (Note: In the light novel, Yozora first calls Sena a cow due to her large breasts, but later nicknames her "Meat" (肉, Niku) when they play a monster hunting video game that has raw and cooked meat as items. Sena reveals she does not mind the insulting nickname because it is the first time she had ever received one.^{LN 1}^{,}^{Ch. 9}^{LN 1}^{,}^{Ch. 3}) Although she originally joins the Neighbors Club to learn how to make friends, she develops feelings for Kodaka after he scolds her for inciting an incident during their trip to the swimming pool.^{LN 8} When it is revealed that, fourteen years previously, her father arranged a marriage between her and Kodaka (his best friend's son),^{LN 7}^{,}^{Ch. 52} Sena confesses her feelings and proposes to Kodaka.^{LN 8} In the anime, Sena is voiced by Kanae Itō in Japanese and by Jad Saxton in English. In the live-action film, she is portrayed by Mio Ootani.
- Kobato Hasegawa (羽瀬川 小鳩, Hasegawa Kobato) is a junior high student at St. Chronica's Academy. She is very close to her older brother Kodaka, and behaves in a jealous and clingy way whenever he does not give her attention. Kobato cosplays as "Reisys V. Felicity Sumeragi", an ancient vampire, her favourite character from the anime Iron Necromancer, by wearing gothic clothing and a red contact lens, drinking tomato juice (blood) and speaking in affected formal language,^{LN 1}^{,}^{Ch. 6} although Kodaka still treats her as a little sister by making her eat her vegetables and take a bath.^{LN 1}^{,}^{Ch. 6} When she gets emotionally worked up, she reverts to a strong Kyūshū accent.^{LN 1} She joins the Neighbors Club to spend more time with Kodaka, and develops a rivalry with Maria, who is closest to her in age.^{Ch. 15} When the club visit her school's festival to watch her class film, it is revealed that she is quite popular, but has refused to make friends with her classmates despite their efforts to befriend her.^{Ch. 55} In the anime, Kobato is voiced by Kana Hanazawa in Japanese and by Alison Viktorin in English. In the live-action film, she is portrayed by Sayu Kubota.
- Yukimura Kusunoki (楠 幸村, Kusunoki Yukimura) is an effeminate schoolmate who is first introduced as Kodaka's stalker. A gullible student with low self-esteem, Yukimura sees Kodaka as a romantic and masculine outlaw who lives life the way he wants to, and eagerly pledges to become his "underling" in order to learn how to become manlier.^{LN 1}^{,}^{Ch. 5} Despite claiming to be a boy,^{Ch. 15} Yukimura dresses in girls' clothes, as he takes to heart Yozora's flippant comments about masculinity and clothing.^{Ch. 15, 25} Later in the story, Kodaka discovers that Yukimura is actually a girl, even to Yukimura's own surprise.^{LN 5 ch 6-7}^{,}^{Ch. 38, 39} In the anime, Yukimura is voiced by Nozomi Yamamoto in Japanese and by Ashleigh Domangue in English. In the live-action film, Yukimura is portrayed by Sara Takatsuki.
- Rika Shiguma (志熊 理科, Shiguma Rika; lit. "sigma science") (Note: According to the chapter footnotes regarding Rika Shiguma's name, "Shiguma" 志熊 translates to the greek letter "Sigma" and Rika, while being a typical girl's name when romanized, has a kanji 理科 that translates to "science" ^{Ch. 13 translator's footnote}) is a first-year genius-scientist student whom the school has given a special research room and excused from attending classes. She is an illeist who always addresses herself in third person, never in first person. She becomes interested in Kodaka after he rescues her from the lab after one of her experiments goes disastrously wrong. Although she wears glasses and seems serious,^{Ch. 27} she is the most eccentric and sexually forward club member, and often converts innocent remarks into something perverted.^{Ch. 13, 26} She enjoys reading BL (boys' love) dōjinshi (self-published magazines), and is especially aroused by stories that involve intercourse between mecha.^{Ch. 14} In the anime, Rika is voiced by Misato Fukuen in Japanese and by Alexis Tipton in English. For the live-action film, Rika is portrayed by Mao Kanjō.
- Maria Takayama (高山 マリア, Takayama Maria) is a ten-year-old nun and the club's staff adviser. She is very rude and crass, and often uses a variety of expletives when annoyed.^{Ch. 12} After Kodaka starts making her packed lunches, she becomes very affectionate with her new-found onii-chan (big brother), much to Kobato's annoyance.^{Ch. 15} She is easily manipulated by Yozora, who gets her to perform menial tasks by framing them as things adults would do.^{Ch. 12} Volume 8 of the light novels has a story where her teaching position is challenged.^{LN 8}^{,}^{Ch. 59-60} In the anime series, Maria is voiced by Yuka Iguchi in Japanese and by Kristi Kang in English. For the live-action film, Maria is portrayed by Momoka Yamada.

=== Supporting characters ===
- Pegasus Kashiwazaki (柏崎 天馬, Kashiwazaki Pegasasu) is Sena's father and the president of St. Chronica's. As a friend of Kodaka's father, he arranges for Kodaka and Kobato to attend the school.^{LN 1} He is embarrassed by the unusual pronunciation of his first name, which would normally be "Tenma". He often badmouths Kodaka's father, but only because he truly values him as his best (and more or less only) friend.^{Ch. 23} He seems intent to betroth Sena to Kodaka, often saying that he considers Kodaka to be "a man I can entrust Sena to", after misunderstanding Sena's intentions to make Kobato her younger sister.^{Ch. 52} In the anime series, he is voiced by Ryōtarō Okiayu in Japanese and by Brandon Potter in English.
- Stella Redfield (ステラ・レッドフィールド, Sutera Reddofīrudo) is the Kashiwazaki family butler^{Ch. 23} and Sena's older half-sister.^{LN C} A blonde 22-year-old woman, she is a capable servant, though often surprisingly outspoken to her employer. She has a habit of making straight-faced jokes. In the anime series, Stella is voiced by Ryōka Yuzuki in Japanese and by Caitlin Glass in English.
- Kate Takayama (高山 ケイト, Takayama Keito)^{,}^{Ch. 32} is Maria's older sister who meets Kodaka and expresses her gratitude to him and the Neighbors Club for taking care of Maria and keeping Maria's ego in check. She has a largely nonchalant attitude, and sometimes inappropriately belches or farts in public. Despite being a nun and likely staff at the school, she eventually calls Kodaka onii-chan (big brother) as well, since she is only 15 years old.^{Ch. 32} In the English version of the manga, she goes by Keito. In the anime series, she is voiced by Emiri Katō in Japanese and by Brina Palencia in English.
- Aoi Yusa (遊佐 葵, Yusa Aoi) is the student body treasurer at St. Chronica's. She is Sena's classmate and ranked second in the year-end exam. She competes with Sena in her studies and is also envious of her popularity and other excellent attributes.^{Ch. 48} She also attempted to disband the Neighbors Club twice due to the club's lax performance and unmet requirements, but failed nonetheless after being faced with Yozora's and Sena's harsh scolding.^{Ch. 59-60} She is first introduced in second season of the anime series, and is voiced by Mariya Ise in Japanese and by Felecia Angelle in English.
- Hinata Hidaka (日高 日向, Hidaka Hinata) is the student council president in the anime series. She is very popular in school, having been elected twice, and is an athlete who helps out in all the sports clubs.^{Ch. 56}. It is later revealed she is Yozora's older sister. She is voiced by Yōko Hikasa in Japanese and by Brittney Karbowski in English.
- Hayato Hasegawa (羽瀬川 隼人, Hasegawa Hayato) is Kodaka and Kobato's father. He is a renowned archaeologist. He is voiced by Katsuyuki Konishi in Japanese and by Bill Jenkins in English.
- Saionji (西園寺) is the cold-hearted student council president who is an exclusive character to the live-action film adaptation. He is portrayed by Louis Kurihara.

== Media ==
=== Light novels ===
The original light novel series, written by Yomi Hirasaka and illustrated by Buriki, began publication on Media Factory's MF Bunko J imprint from August 31, 2009, to August 25, 2015. Eleven volumes in the series have been published. Hirasaka and Buriki also released the light novel Boku wa Tomodachi ga Sukunai Connect in December 2012. Boku wa Tomodachi ga Sukunai Universe (僕は友達が少ない ゆにばーす) is a series of anthology stories by various guest authors, including Yomi Hirasaka, Yūji Yūji, Wataru Watari, Yū Shimizu, Sō Sagara, Asaura, Hajime Asano, Ryō Iwanami, Shirō Shiratori, Takaya Kagami and guest illustrators Buriki, Kantoku, Ruroo, Peco, QP:flapper, Miyama-Zero, Shunsaku Tomose, Yuu Kamiya, Koin, Ponkan8, Hanpen Sakura.

Two volumes of the spin-off Boku wa Tomodachi ga Sukunai Universe were published on November 23, 2011, and February 22, 2013.

No.	Japanese release date	Japanese ISBN
1	August 25, 2009	978-4-84-012879-7
2	November 25, 2009	978-4-84-013095-0
3	March 25, 2010	978-4-84-013252-7
4	July 23, 2010	978-4-84-013457-6
5	November 25, 2010	978-4-84-013589-4
6	May 25, 2011	978-4-84-013881-9
7	September 22, 2011	978-4-84-014222-9
8	June 25, 2012	978-4-84-014598-5
9	August 23, 2013	978-4-84-015129-0
10	June 6, 2014	978-4-04-066392-0
11	August 25, 2015	978-4-04-067751-4

=== Manga ===
The first Boku wa Tomodachi ga Sukunai manga series, written and illustrated by Itachi, was published in Media Factory's Monthly Comic Alive magazine from March 27, 2010, to December 26, 2020. The series has been collected in twenty tankōbon volumes. Seven Seas Entertainment has licensed the first manga series in North America under the title Haganai: I Don't Have Many Friends and released it between 2012 and 2022.

A remade manga series, Boku wa Tomodachi ga Sukunai+ (僕は友達が少ない+), written by Misaki Harukawa and illustrated by Shouichi Taguchi, was published in Shueisha's Jump SQ.19 from November 19, 2010, to June 19, 2012. Plus introduces the characters in a different order and goes through different adventures. The series was collected in two volumes, published on October 4, 2011, and August 3, 2012.

Three volumes of short stories, titled Boku wa Tomdachi ga Sukunai: Kōshiki Anthology Comic (僕は友達が少ない 公式アンソロジーコミック), have been published by Media Factory since October 22, 2011. Each chapter of them is written and illustrated by different authors.

The series of one-shot stories Haganai: I Don't Have Many Friends - Now With 50% More Fail! (僕は友達が少ない ショボーン！, Boku wa Tomodachi ga Sukunai: Shobōn!) written by Chiruwo Kazehana and illustrated by Shirabii; and Haganai: I Don't Have Many Friends - Club Minutes (僕は友達が少ない はがない日和, Boku wa Tomodachi ga Sukunai: Haganai Biyori) written by Kiurian and illustrated by Bomi, were serialized in Comic Alive in 2011–2012 and 2012–2013 respectively. Both series have been licensed in English by Seven Seas Entertainment; and released on July 1 and December 16, 2014, respectively.

In the English manga, each chapter is numbered as a Club Activity Log. Translation was done by Ryan Peterson, and adaptation was done by Ysabet Reinhardt MacFarlane.^{Vol. 1}

No.	Original release date	Original ISBN	English release date	English ISBN
1	July 20, 2010	978-4-84-013346-3	November 13, 2012	978-1-937867-12-6
Club Preparations: Something Resembling a Prologue! (AKA: Presenting the Characters!); 1. "Hasegawa Kodaka"; 2. "Yozora & Sena"; 3. "The Hunt"; 4. "The Wonderful World of Bishoujo Games"; 5. "Little Brother" (Note: At the end of the English version of manga volume 1 is a preview chapter for Mayo Chiki.)
In the prologue, Kodaka Hasegawa enjoys a day at the beach, but it is just a dream as he is with a group of people called the Neighbors Club and they have been trying to eat some dark nabe. Prior to the eating event, Kodaka is a transfer student who has had trouble making friends. He encounters a classmate, the normally cold Yozora Mikazuki talking happily with a classmate, but the latter is revealed to be an "air friend". As they talk about their troubles in making friends, Yozora is inspired to make the Neighbors Club: dedicated to help people make friends, and recruits Kodaka as a charter member. She makes a poster that attracts Sena Kashiwazaki, a beautiful blonde who wishes to make female friends. Sena and Yozora do not get along, but they attempt their first activity: a cooperative monster role-playing game. However, Yozora and Sena end up attacking each other, causing the mission to fail. The next activity is a gal game. Kodaka questions Sena and Yozora's choice of responses. Suspecting that someone is stalking him, Kodaka searches the school, followed by Sena and Yozora, and eventually discover Yukimura Kusunoki, an effeminate boy who sees Kodaka as a role model. Yozora has him join the club.
2	May 23, 2011	978-4-84-013799-7	February 5, 2013	978-1-937867-17-1
6. "The State of Affairs in the Hasegawa Household"; 7. "Soiled Sorrow"; 8. "The Legend of Momotaro"; 9. "The Pool (Part 1)"; 10. "The Pool (Part 2)"
At home, Kodaka attends to his younger sister Kobato, who thinks she is a vampire. Kodaka and Yozora stumble upon Sena as she plays a hentai game. When Sena tries to defend it as art, Yozora challenges her to read some of the dialogue out loud. The Neighbors Club practices their acting skills in role-playing a version of Momotarō. Sena invites Kodaka to a water park so she can learn how to swim. When Sena is confronted by some guys, Kodaka defends her. He thinks about his childhood best friend and his words about how having a real friend is more valuable than having a hundred friends, but when he mumbles it while resting, he startles Yozora. In the bonus chapter, Sena and Yozora engage in some non-verbal sparring as they wait in front of the school for Kodaka.
3	September 22, 2011	978-4-84-014035-5	June 4, 2013	978-1-937867-30-0
11. "LOL"; 12. "Takayama Maria"; 13. "Shiguma Rika"; 14. "Fangirl"; 15. "Little Sister"
The Neighbors Club discuss how comedy could improve their social stature, and try out some wigs. Kodaka tries to tell some funny stories but falls flat. Kodaka discovers a ten-year-old girl in a nun’s habit, who turns out to be the club’s advisor Maria Takayama. Science girl Rika Shiguma joins the club after Kodaka rescues her from a lab accident. She shares her interest of robot manga with underlying sexual innuendos. When Kodaka offers to make lunches for Maria, Kobato becomes jealous and becomes the club's latest member.
4	December 22, 2011	978-4-84-014076-8	October 15, 2013	978-1-937867-70-6
16. ”The Story of Saint Aniki-san"; 17. ”Romancing Saga Prefecture (Part One)"; 18. ”Romancing Saga Prefecture (Part Two)"; 19. ”Karaoke"; 20. ”The Unfortunate Club"
The Neighbors Club take turns writing a round-robin story. They don virtual-reality glasses and play a prototype role-playing video game called Romancing Saga Prefecture. They try to do karaoke as a group, but Yozora and Sena rent individual booths. They reflect on their inability to make friends, during which Sena invites Kodaka to her house.
5	April 23, 2012	978-4-84-014438-4	January 21, 2014	978-1-937867-86-7
21. ”The Phone That Never Rings"; Side Story I: Binding Magic Release!; 22. ”A Day at the Pool"; Side Story II: The Manifestation of the Demon Astaroth!!; 23. ”A Visit to the Kashiwazaki Residence (Part 1)"; 24. ”A Visit to the Kashiwazaki Residence (Part 2)"
The Neighbors Club decides to organize activities by communicating with cell phones; Sena scrambles to get one. To beat the heat, Kobato is inspired to strip/dress down from her gothic lolita outfit. When the club goes to the pool, Kodaka is embarrassed by Yukimura’s bikini outfit. When the club meets in swimming gear, Yozora sports a horse head with her outfit. Sena invites Kodaka and Kobato to her house, where they meet Sena’s father, Pegasus Kashiwazaki. After dinner, the Kashiwazakis have them stay over where Kobato takes a bath with Sena, and Kodaka shares conversation and a drink with Pegasus.
6	August 23, 2012	978-4-84-014708-8	March 4, 2014	978-1-626920-11-8
25. ”The Beach"; 26. "Ghost Stories"; 27. "Summer Festival (Part One)"; 28. "Summer Festival (Part Two)"
Ten years ago, Kodaka plans to tell his one-and-only friend that he has to move, but his friend does not show up. Back at present time, the Neighbors Club go to the beach and stay the night at Sena’s summer beach house, during which Yozora tells a ghost story about betraying friends that have many of the girls wanting Kodaka to escort them to the bathroom. Inspired to eat takoyaki, the club goes to the summer festival where everyone except Yozora wear yukatas. After eating and playing games, they set off fireworks. Afterwards, Yozora’s hair accidentally catches fire and has to be doused. A week later, she shows up to school with her hair cut, but Kodaka recognizes she is his childhood friend.
7	December 22, 2012	978-4-84-014767-5	June 17, 2014	978-1-626920-35-4
29. "Reunion"; 30. "Pouf"; 31. "Yaoi Game Club"; Haganai Connect. "Time Keeps Moving Again"
Kodaka learns that Yozora had known they were childhood friends all this time, and that she did not show up on the last day because she was too embarrassed to reveal that she was a girl. They agree to keep their childhood friendship a secret from the other club members and treat each other as they always have. Yozora and Rika style up Sena’s hair into an elaborate pouf. When Rika changes her own hairstyle and goes without glasses, Kodaka is attracted to her. The club screens an anime ‘’Yaoi Game Club’’, which Rika insists is not adult, and find it rather interesting until the last scene where the guys kiss, which raises some emotions and discussion regarding kissing among the members. In the Haganai Connect chapter, Yozora tells her side of the story of her seeing Kodaka for the first time in ten years, and the formation of the Neighbors Club.
8	April 23, 2013	978-4-84-015047-7	August 19, 2014	978-1-626920-44-6
32. "The Sister"; 33. "Fan Service Chapter! (Featuring Kashiwazaki Sena in a Nude Scene!"; 34. "Sisters"; 35. "Victory Party"
Kodaka and Yozora try the friends custom of comparing answers on their recent exams. Kodaka meets Keito, a nun at his school who turns out to be Maria's older sister, yet is only 15 years old (younger than Kodaka). Sena invites Kodaka to her bedroom to study, but Kodaka discovers Sena is stranger than he thinks. After an attempted study session, he stays over for a bath with Sena's father. Maria stays over at the Hasegawas. The Neighbors Club have a party to celebrate end of exams, and play the king game.
9	November 22, 2013	978-4-04-066115-5	October 21, 2014	978-1-626920-77-4
36. "Amusement Park: The Invitation"; 37. "Amusement Park: Black Dragon"; 38. "Hot Springs"; 39. "Haves and Have-Nots"; 40. "Time Machine"
Sena invites Kobato to the Yokoshima Wonderland amusement park but it soon escalates to bringing the entire Neighbors Club. Kodaka's dad wonders if Kodaka and Sena are engaged but Kodaka denies it. At the park, the club tries the Black Dragon roller coaster but they get really sick. Kodaka, Sena, and Kobato attend the Iron Necromancer show where Sena gets mistaken for Kobato's mother. Yozora and Sena challenge each other to ride the Black Dragon again, while the others do milder rides. Yozora and Sena are so dizzy, they throw up on Kodaka. But in the men's bath, Kodaka discovers Yukimura is actually a girl after all, even to the latter's surprise. Later on, Kodaka remarks how Rika has changed her hairstyle. By Kodaka's request, Rika invents a time machine, where Kodaka experiences his last interaction with Yozora when he was a kid ten years ago. But the machine is actually a hypnosis gimmick and Kodaka was dreaming, but the club hears Kodaka mentioning Yozora's name. Yozora then admits that Kodaka and she used to be childhood friends.
10	March 22, 2014	978-4-04-066505-4	February 3, 2015	978-1-626920-93-4
41. "A Birthday"; 42. "No Two Ways About It: It's a Date! (Right?)"; 43. "Birthday Party"; 44. "The Truth Is, I'd Already Figured It Out"
Sena wants to have a birthday party for Kobato; and Kodaka agrees as it is good social practice. The girls join Kodaka in shopping for presents; on the way they discuss what everyone is wearing, which prompts some of them to change their attire. Sena asks Kodaka whether he wants a girlfriend. The party goes well. Afterwards, Maria and her sister Keito stay over. Kodaka has the club participate in the school festival. They ponder doing a maid cafe with the girls taking turns trying to serve Kodaka.
11	September 23, 2014	978-4-04-066851-2	June 16, 2015	978-1-626921-54-2
45. "Fortune-telling"; 46. "The Third Meeting to Choose What to Do for the School Festival"; 47. "Is This a Date? No, It's the First Sign of the Bloody Battlefield to Come"; 48. "Natural-Born Princess"; 49. "We've Known Each Other Since We Were Kids"; 50. "The Second Time"
While brainstorming what to do for the school festival, Yozora tricks Sena into thinking the former is a fortune teller by using the Forer effect. After Kobato reveals that her middle school class is doing a film for their festival, the Neighbors Club decide to make one of their own. Yozora takes Kodaka to research a theater film, but their random pick of a foreign romance movie ends up being an adult film. Afterwards, they visit a cat cafe where Kodaka realizes Yozora is fond of cats. When student council treasurer Yusa Aoi expresses her jealousy of her academic rival Sena and her cool boyfriend, Kodaka thinks more highly of himself, until Sena says she not even know her. Yozora produces a compelling script about friendship, but the club has conflicts in the casting. Following a popular vote that recasts everyone, Yozora rewrites the script, leading to a heated argument between her and Sena over whether Yozora is using her childhood friendship with Kodaka to bias the script. Yozora asks Kodaka which is more important: their memories from ten years ago or what they have now.
12	March 23, 2015	978-4-04-067281-6	September 22, 2015	978-1-626921-74-0
51. How She Responded; 52. Pegasus' Wild Fantasy; 53. The Fall of Mikazuki Yozora; 54. In the Science Room; 55. Hasegawa Kobato
Yozora presents a new script for the Neighbors Club film, and it looks promising that they start filming on it. When Sena's father asks Kodaka how their relationship is progressing, Kodaka discovers that he and Sena had pledged to be engaged when they were kids. The news shocks the other Neighbors Club members although they try to disclaim it. When Keito learns about the plot and says it is similar to an old film, Kodaka rents it and discovers that Yozora had plagiarized it. Sena pushes her own backup script, and the club has to film that one. Kodaka observes Rika editing the film, and admires her dedication as well as her collection of pictures of the club members. The Neighbors Club visits Kobato's middle school festival and are impressed by her film acting. Kobato's classmates tell Kodaka how they try to be friends with Kobato but that she withdraws from them. Yusa Aoi appears and is jealous of Kodaka and Sena.
13	October 23, 2015	978-4-04-067827-6	April 5, 2016	978-1-626922-22-8
56. King Lear; 57. Warm-Up Act; 58. Turning His Back on the Light; 59. The Crescent Moon; 60. Seeing Red
On the sports day of the festival, Kodaka sees Yozora with a sour attitude, bitter at student council president Hidaka Hinata for being popular and normal. He meets with Rika who asks him about what he thinks of Sena and about a situation of a struggling lonely person. However, Kodaka brushes off those ideas and thinks she means Kobato instead of Rika. Rika then tells Kodaka "Aren't we all already friends?" but Kodaka doesn't hear the last part because of the fireworks. Later, Kodaka and the gang share a meal but Rika is not present. Kodaka discovers that Rika has collapsed in exhaustion in editing the film, and rushes her to the infirmary. They cancel the screenings of their club film and end up watching it in private afterwards. Yusa Aoi of the student council interrupts the club and questions their purpose. Although Yozora and Sena defend the club, Yusa Aoi comes up with a problem: Maria is not a real nun and thus cannot be qualified to be the advisor; she had merely been hanging out with Keito who thought it was cute that she dressed up and played along. However, Sena gets her father to make Maria a staff member, frustrating Yusa who vows revenge. Sena tells Kodaka in front of the gang that they should get married.
14	July 23, 2016	978-4-04-068258-7	November 29, 2016	978-1-626922-50-1
15	April 22, 2017	978-4-04-069044-5	February 13, 2018	978-1-626922-87-7
16	February 23, 2018	978-4-04-069627-0	December 18, 2018	978-1-626928-48-0
17	January 23, 2019	978-4-04-065178-1	September 24, 2019	978-1-642757-01-9
18	October 23, 2019	978-4-04-064087-7	June 30, 2020 (digital); August 18, 2020 (physical)	978-1-645054-51-1
19	March 23, 2021	978-4-04-680304-7	October 26, 2021	978-1-645058-44-1
20	March 23, 2021	978-4-04-680387-0	April 5, 2022	978-1-648272-29-5

=== Anime ===
In May 2011, an anime television series based on the light novels was announced on the wraparound jacket of the sixth light novel, with an original video animation bundled with the seventh light novel released on September 22, 2011. Produced by AIC Build under the direction of Hisashi Saitō, the series aired in Japan from October 7 to December 23, 2011. The opening theme is "Zannenkei Rinjinbu Hoshi Futatsuhan" (残念系隣人部★★☆; "The Regrettable Neighbours Club Two and a Half Stars") by Marina Inoue, Kanae Itō, Nozomi Yamamoto, Misato Fukuen, Kana Hanazawa, and Yuka Iguchi, while the ending theme is "Watashi no Ki-mo-chi" (私のキ・モ・チ; "My Feelings") by Marina Inoue. The anime is based on the first three volumes and the beginning of volume four. The anime was licensed for streaming by Funimation, who hosted the stream on the website and Nico Nico, before licensing the series for home video release.

A follow-up original video animation episode was released on September 26, 2012. The ending theme is "Kimi wa Tomodachi" (君は友達; "You Are My Friend") by Inoue, Itō, Yamamoto, Fukuen, Hanazawa, Iguchi and Ryohei Kimura.

A second season, titled Haganai NEXT, aired from January 11 to March 29, 2013. It is based on the novels from volume four until the first few present in volume nine. The series was directed by Toru Kitahata whilst Hirasaka was in charge of the scripts. The opening and ending themes, respectively, are "Be My Friend" and "Bokura no Tsubasa" (僕らの翼; "Our Wings"), both performed by Inoue, Itō, Yamamoto, Fukuen, Hanazawa and Iguchi.

=== Game ===
A visual novel, Boku wa Tomodachi ga Sukunai Portable, was developed by Namco Bandai Games for the PlayStation Portable and released on February 23, 2012.

=== Live-action film ===
On April 24, 2013, Ryukoku University posted a casting call for extras for a 2014 film adaptation of Haganai, to be distributed by Toei and produced by "I Don't Have Many Friends" Production Committee, consisting of Times-In, Kinoshita Group, Pony Canyon, Toei Video Company, Toei itself, Kadokawa, Dwango and Guild. Hirasaka later confirmed the film's existence on May 2, 2013, stating that, whilst he initially did not approve of the project, as he did not feel the story was intended for live-action, he decided to approve it in light of a crisis in the light novel industry. Hirasaka will have a completely hands-off role in the film's production. Takurō Oikawa, the film's director, chose not to watch the anime and told his cast members not to watch it either so that they can present a fresh interpretation of the light novels. The Japanese film site Cinema Cafe began streaming the full trailer for the live-action film light novel series on December 4, 2013. The film was released on February 1, 2014.

== Reception ==
The second volume of the manga adaptation ranked seventh on the top 30 of Japanese Comic Ranking, for the week of May 23–29, 2011.

Rebecca Silverman of Anime News Network found the first graphic novel “fairly entertaining” with artist Itachi's illustrations “between beautiful depictions of the girls and messy sketches, which actually works well for the series”. While the premise “retreads familiar ground”, she noted the girls’ reactions in the dating sim chapter as the highlight of the volume.

Tim Jones of THEM Anime Reviews gave the anime series three of five stars. He grouped the social misfits show as a “raunchy romp filled with lots of cheesecake and hit-or-miss comedy”, with “great leads, okay side characters”, and did not “need to be reminded every episode how huge Sena’s breasts are, thanks”.

Carl Kimlinger of Anime News Network found the anime series interesting in that it starts with misfits finding friends and deferred the typical romantic comedy entanglements but was deflated that the series was “taking on harem baggage.” The second half of series was "increasingly formulaic" and left him longing for a story. He found the episodes to have very little novelty: "Relationships change little, characters evolve not at all, and the message—that these outcasts have already found their friends and just refuse to acknowledge it—remains the same. We might as well be watching the first couple of episodes repeat ad infinitum." Bamboo Dong found the series' strength to be in the character development, but its drawback was that such moments are far and few compared to the "recycled referential humor, like drawing the characters inside a video game, or drawing them inside a dating sim", and the same "bland paste of old jokes". She preferred the English dub as the characters insulting each other was better than the dull name-calling in Japanese.

Andy Hanley of UK Anime.net gave the anime series a 6/10, and called the anime a series of two halves, where the first half contained “great and hugely funny episodes” but the second half was “increasingly tired and even unlikeable” where “sure-fire comedy concepts such as a visit to karaoke or the swimming pool fail to do anything noteworthy with their subject material.” He found that the main characters undermined the series later on with “Yozora's snarky, bossy attitude which works so well in early episodes turns to bitchiness and then downright bullying” as Sena's obsessions to “become something of a dead horse which the series insists upon flogging.” He later gave the first graphic novel a 4/10. With Yozora and Sena as "massive bitches" more so than in the anime, he wrote that "a better title for the series might be It's Probably For The Best That You Have No Friends." He found the Seven Seas translation to be balanced and that its presentation was without complaint.

== Notes about works cited ==
- "LN" is shortened form for light novel and refers to a volume number of the Haganai light novels.
- "Ch." is a shortened form for "chapter" and refers to a chapter number of the Haganai manga.
