= A-1 Pictures =

Japanese animation studio

A-1 Pictures, Inc.

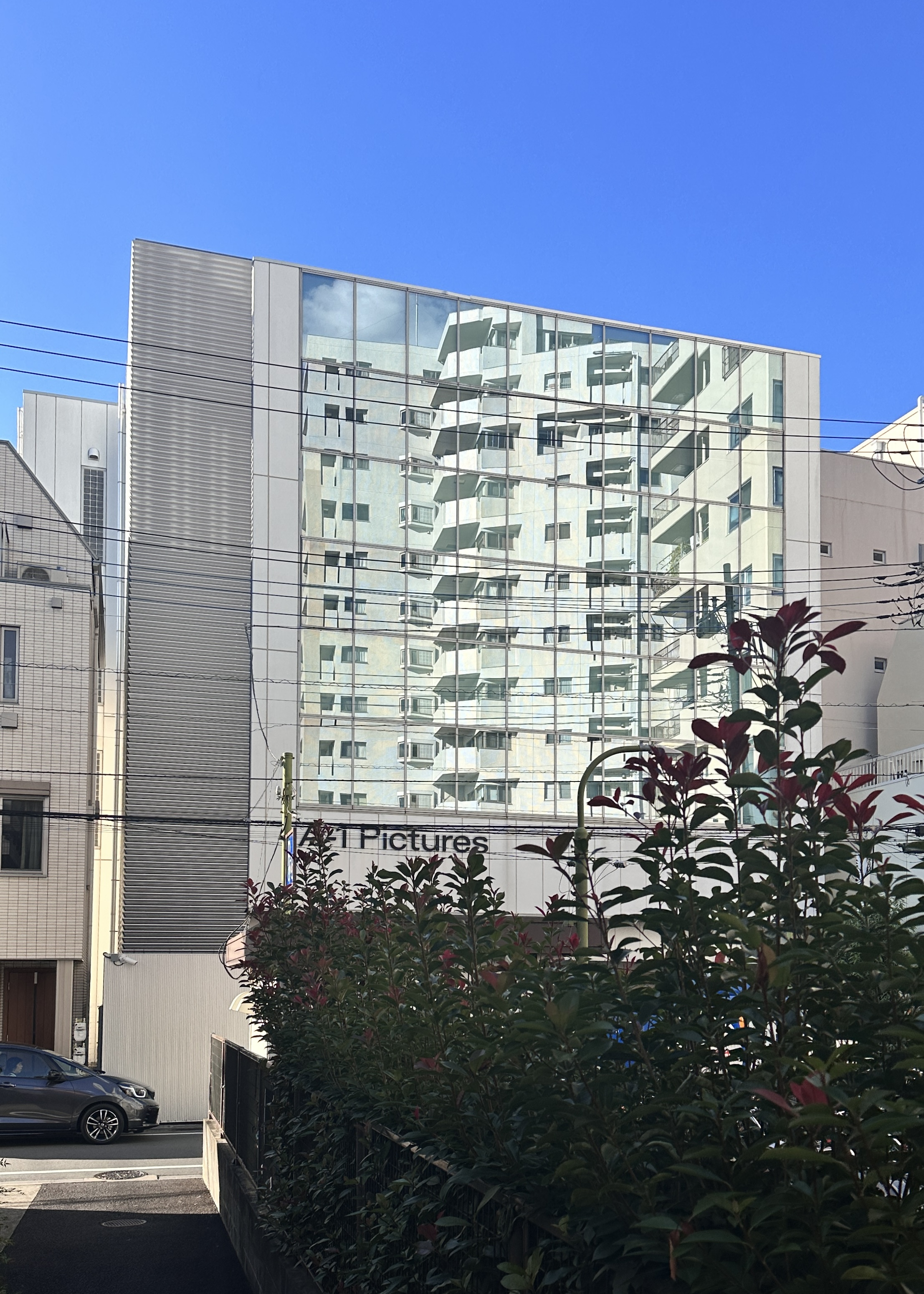
- Headquarters in Suginami, Tokyo
- Native name: 株式会社A-1 Pictures
- Romanized name: Kabushiki-gaisha Ē-wan Pikuchāzu
- Type: Subsidiary
- Industry: Japanese animation
- Founded: May 9, 2005; 21 years ago
- Founder: Mikihiro Iwata
- Headquarters: 4-38-18 Naritahigashi, Suginami, Tokyo, Japan
- Key people: Akira Shimizu (president)
- Number of employees: 285 (as of September 2025)
- Parent: Aniplex
- Divisions: Animation Department (Note: A-1 Pictures Animation Department (A-1 Pictures 動画部), the studio's animation department.); Art Department (Note: A-1 Pictures Art Department (A-1 Pictures 美術部), the studio's background art department.); Photography Department (Note: A-1 Pictures Photography Department (A-1 Pictures 撮影部), the studio's compositing and visual effects department.); Coloring Department (Note: A-1 Pictures Finishing Department (A-1 Pictures 仕上部), the studio's coloring and painting department.); Fukuoka Studio (Note: A-1 Pictures Fukuoka Studio (A-1 Pictures 福岡スタジオ), the studio's Fukuoka branch.); Psyde Kick Studio (Note: Psyde Kick Studio (サイドキックスタジオ), the studio's in-house production label launched in July 1, 2025, and led by producer Jun Kato.)
- Website: a1p.jp

A-1 Pictures, Inc. (Japanese: 株式会社A-1 Pictures, Hepburn: Kabushiki-gaisha Ē-wan Pikuchāzu) is a Japanese animation studio and production company founded by ex-Sunrise producer Mikihiro Iwata. It is a subsidiary of Sony Music Entertainment Japan's animation production firm Aniplex.

== History ==
The company was established by SMEJ's animation production division, Aniplex, on May 9, 2005, to animate its animated series and productions. In 2006, it co-produced the original production Zenmai Zamurai, and in October of the same year, established a studio in Asagaya. In the following year, 2007, the studio produced its first series, Ōkiku Furikabutte.

Originally established to oversee the production of only a few of Aniplex's family-oriented series, the studio has since grown and expanded as a full-fledged studio involved in the production of a wide range of media and animation productions and other activities, which it has overseen. The studio has also expanded its international presence, participating in the noted international convention, Anime Expo 2007 (AX 2007), held in Long Beach, California, and having its own panel there.

In 2010, A-1 Pictures worked in collaboration with a joint project of TV Tokyo's animation department and Aniplex called Anime no Chikara for the creation of original animated series. Three animated series were produced that year for the project: Sound of the Sky, Night Raid 1931 and Occult Academy.

In April 2018, A-1 Pictures rebranded its Kōenji Studio as CloverWorks, giving it a unique brand identity, which made it distinguishable from its main Asagaya Studio. On October 1, 2018, CloverWorks separated from A-1 Pictures, although it still remains as a subsidiary under Aniplex.

On June 17, 2024, the studio 3Hz announced that its animation planning and production business was transferred to A-1 Pictures.

== Productions ==
=== Television series ===
Title	Broadcast channel	First run start date	First run end date	Eps	Notes	Ref.
Zenmai Zamurai	NHK E	April 3, 2006	February 6, 2009	215	Original work. Co-production with No Side.	
Robby & Kerobby	TV Tokyo	April 1, 2007	March 30, 2008	52	Original work.	
Big Windup!	TBS, MBS	April 13, 2007	September 28, 2007	25	Based on a manga by Asa Higuchi.	
Persona: Trinity Soul	Tokyo MX, BS11	January 5, 2008	June 28, 2008	26	Based on a video game by Atlus.	
Birdy the Mighty: Decode	TV Saitama	July 5, 2008	March 28, 2009	25	Based on a manga by Masami Yuki.	
Black Butler	MBS	October 3, 2008	March 27, 2009	24	Based on a manga by Yana Toboso.	
Kannagi: Crazy Shrine Maidens	Tokyo MX	October 4, 2008	December 27, 2008	13	Based on a manga by Eri Takenashi. Production co-operation by Ordet.	
Valkyria Chronicles	MBS	April 5, 2009	September 27, 2009	26	Based on a video game by Sega.	
Fairy Tail	TXN (TV Tokyo)	October 12, 2009	September 29, 2019	328	Based on a manga by Hiro Mashima. Co-production with Satelight. (first series); Co-production with Bridge. (second and third series); Co-production with CloverWorks. (third series)	
Sound of the Sky	TV Tokyo	January 5, 2010	March 23, 2010	12	Original work.	
Big Windup! 2	TBS, MBS	April 2, 2010	June 25, 2010	13	Sequel to Big Windup!	
Working!!	Tokyo MX	April 4, 2010	June 27, 2010	13	Based on a manga by Karino Takatsu.	
Night Raid 1931	TV Tokyo	April 6, 2010	June 29, 2010	13	Original work.	
Black Butler II	MBS	July 2, 2010	September 17, 2010	12	Sequel to Black Butler.	
Occult Academy	TV Tokyo	July 6, 2010	September 28, 2010	13	Original work.	
Togainu no Chi	TBS; MBS	October 8, 2010	December 23, 2010	12	Based on a video game by Nitro+chiral.	
Fractale	Fuji TV (Noitamina)	January 14, 2011	March 31, 2011	11	Original work. Production co-operation by Ordet.	
Anohana: The Flower We Saw That Day	Fuji TV (Noitamina)	April 15, 2011	June 24, 2011	11	Original work.	
Blue Exorcist	JNN (MBS)	April 17, 2011	October 2, 2011	25	Based on a manga by Kazue Kato.	
Uta no Prince-sama: Maji Love 1000%	Tokyo MX	July 3, 2011	September 25, 2011	13	Based on a video game by Broccoli.	
The Idolmaster	TBS	July 8, 2011	December 23, 2011	25	Based on a video game by Bandai Namco Entertainment.	
Working!!	Tokyo MX	October 1, 2011	December 24, 2011	13	Sequel to Working!!.	
Space Brothers	NNS (ytv)	April 1, 2012	March 22, 2014	99	Based on a manga by Chūya Koyama.	
Tsuritama	Fuji TV (Noitamina)	April 13, 2012	June 29, 2012	12	Original work.	
Sword Art Online	Tokyo MX	July 8, 2012	December 23, 2012	25	Based on a light novel by Reki Kawahara.	
From the New World	TV Asahi	September 29, 2012	March 23, 2013	25	Based on a novel by Yūsuke Kishi.	
Chō Soku Henkei Gyrozetter	TXN (TV Tokyo)	October 2, 2012	September 24, 2013	51	Based on a video game by Square Enix.	
Magi: The Labyrinth of Magic	JNN (MBS)	October 7, 2012	March 31, 2013	25	Based on a manga by Shinobu Ohtaka	
Oreshura	Tokyo MX	January 6, 2013	March 31, 2013	13	Based on a light novel by Yūji Yūji.	
Vividred Operation	MBS	January 11, 2013	March 29, 2013	12	Original work.	
Uta no Prince-sama: Maji Love 2000%	TV Aichi	April 4, 2013	June 27, 2013	13	Sequel to Uta no Prince-sama: Maji Love 1000%.	
Ore no Imōto ga Konna ni Kawaii Wake ga Nai.	Tokyo MX	April 7, 2013	June 30, 2013	13	Sequel to Oreimo by AIC Build.	
Servant × Service	ABC	July 5, 2013	September 27, 2013	13	Based on a manga by Karino Takatsu.	
Silver Spoon	Fuji TV (Noitamina)	July 12, 2013	March 28, 2014	22	Based on a manga by Hiromu Arakawa.	
Magi: The Kingdom of Magic	JNN (MBS)	October 6, 2013	March 30, 2014	25	Sequel to Magi: The Labyrinth of Magic.	
Galilei Donna	Fuji TV (Noitamina)	October 11, 2013	December 20, 2013	11	Original work.	
World Conquest Zvezda Plot	Tokyo MX	January 12, 2014	March 30, 2014	12	Original work.	
Nanana's Buried Treasure	Fuji TV (Noitamina)	April 11, 2014	June 20, 2014	11	Based on a light novel by Kazuma Ōtorino.	
Sword Art Online II	Tokyo MX	July 5, 2014	December 20, 2014	24	2nd season for Sword Art Online.	
Aldnoah.Zero	Tokyo MX	July 6, 2014	March 29, 2015	24	Original work. Co-production with Troyca.	
Black Butler: Book of Circus	MBS	July 11, 2014	September 12, 2014	10	Related to Black Butler.	
Persona 4: The Golden Animation	MBS	July 11, 2014	September 26, 2014	12	Based on a video game by Atlus.	
Magic Kaito 1412	NNS (ytv)	October 4, 2014	March 28, 2015	24	Based on a manga by Gosho Aoyama.	
The Seven Deadly Sins	JNN (MBS)	October 5, 2014	March 29, 2015	24	Based on a manga by Nakaba Suzuki.	
Your Lie in April	Fuji TV (Noitamina)	October 10, 2014	March 20, 2015	22	Based on a manga by Naoshi Arakawa.	
The Idolmaster Cinderella Girls	Tokyo MX	January 10, 2015	October 17, 2015	25	Based on a social network game by Bandai Namco Entertainment in The Idolmaster series.	
Saekano: How to Raise a Boring Girlfriend	Fuji TV (Noitamina)	January 16, 2015	March 27, 2015	12	Based on a light novel by Fumiaki Maruto.	
Magical Girl Lyrical Nanoha ViVid	Tokyo MX	April 3, 2015	June 19, 2015	12	Based on a manga by Masaki Tsuzuki.	
Gunslinger Stratos: The Animation	Tokyo MX	April 4, 2015	June 20, 2015	12	Based on a video game by Square Enix in Gunslinger Stratos.	
Ultimate Otaku Teacher	NNS (ytv)	April 4, 2015	September 26, 2015	24	Based on a manga by Takeshi Azuma.	
Uta no Prince-sama: Maji Love Revolutions	Tokyo MX	April 5, 2015	June 28, 2015	13	Related to Uta no Prince-sama.	
Gate	Tokyo MX	July 4, 2015	March 26, 2016	24	Based on a novel by Takumi Yanai.	
Working!!!	Tokyo MX	July 5, 2015	September 27, 2015	13	Second sequel to Working!!.	
The Asterisk War	Tokyo MX	October 3, 2015	June 18, 2016	24	Based on a light novel by Yuu Miyazaki.	
The Perfect Insider	Fuji TV (Noitamina)	October 9, 2015	December 18, 2015	11	Based on a novel by Hiroshi Mori.	
Erased	Fuji TV (Noitamina)	January 8, 2016	March 25, 2016	12	Based on a manga by Kei Sanbe.	
Grimgar of Fantasy and Ash	Tokyo MX	January 11, 2016	March 28, 2016	12	Based on a light novel by Ao Jūmonji.	
Ace Attorney	NNS (ytv)	April 2, 2016	September 24, 2016	24	Based on a video game by Capcom.	
B-PROJECT: Kodō＊Ambitious	Tokyo MX	July 3, 2016	September 25, 2016	12	Original work.	
Qualidea Code	Tokyo MX	July 10, 2016	September 25, 2016	12	Based on a light novel by Speakeasy and Square Enix. (Sō Sagara and Wataru Watari)	
The Seven Deadly Sins: Signs of Holy War	JNN (MBS, TBS)	August 28, 2016	September 18, 2016	4	Related to The Seven Deadly Sins.	
WWW.Working!!	Tokyo MX	October 1, 2016	December 24, 2016	13	Spin-off to Working!!.	
Uta no Prince-sama Maji LOVE Legend Star	Tokyo MX	October 2, 2016	December 25, 2016	13	Related to Uta no Prince-sama.	
Occultic;Nine	Tokyo MX	October 9, 2016	December 25, 2016	12	Based on a light novel by Chiyomaru Shikura.	
Blue Exorcist: Kyoto Saga	JNN (MBS)	January 7, 2017	March 25, 2017	12	Sequel to Blue Exorcist.	
Interviews with Monster Girls	Tokyo MX	January 8, 2017	March 26, 2017	12	Based on a manga by Petos.	
Granblue Fantasy The Animation	Tokyo MX	April 2, 2017	June 25, 2017	13	Based on a video game by Cygames.	
Eromanga Sensei	Tokyo MX	April 9, 2017	June 25, 2017	12	Based on a light novel by Tsukasa Fushimi.	
Saekano: How to Raise a Boring Girlfriend Flat	Fuji TV (Noitamina)	April 14, 2017	June 23, 2017	11	Sequel to Saekano: How to Raise a Boring Girlfriend.	
Fate/Apocrypha	Tokyo MX	July 2, 2017	December 31, 2017	25	Based on a light novel by Yūichirō Higashide.	
The Idolm@ster SideM	Tokyo MX	October 7, 2017	December 30, 2017	13	Based on a social network game by Bandai Namco Entertainment in The Idolmaster series.	
Blend S	Tokyo MX	October 8, 2017	December 24, 2017	12	Based on a 4-panel manga by Miyuki Nakayama.	
Record of Grancrest War	Tokyo MX	January 6, 2018	June 23, 2018	24	Based on a light novel by Ryo Mizuno.	
The Seven Deadly Sins: Revival of The Commandments	JNN (MBS, TBS)	January 13, 2018	June 30, 2018	24	Sequel to The Seven Deadly Sins.	
Darling in the Franxx	Tokyo MX	January 13, 2018	July 7, 2018	24	Original work. Co-production with CloverWorks and Studio Trigger.	
Wotakoi: Love Is Hard for Otaku	Fuji TV (Noitamina)	April 13, 2018	June 22, 2018	11	Based on a manga by Fujita.	
Sword Art Online: Alicization	Tokyo MX	October 7, 2018	September 20, 2020	47	3rd season for Sword Art Online. After episode 24, the anime is titled as Sword Art Online: Alicization – War of Underworld.	
Kaguya-sama: Love Is War	Tokyo MX	January 12, 2019	March 30, 2019	12	Based on a manga by Aka Akasaka.	
22/7	Tokyo MX	January 11, 2020	March 28, 2020	12	Part of the multimedia project idol girl group 22/7 by Yasushi Akimoto, Aniplex, and Sony Music Records.	
Kaguya-sama: Love Is War?	Tokyo MX	April 11, 2020	June 27, 2020	12	Sequel to Kaguya-sama: Love Is War.	
Hypnosis Mic: Division Rap Battle: Rhyme Anima	Tokyo MX	October 3, 2020	December 26, 2020	13	Part of the multimedia project Hypnosis Mic: Division Rap Battle by King Records.	
Warlords of Sigrdrifa	Tokyo MX	October 3, 2020	December 26, 2020	12	Original work.	
86	Tokyo MX	April 11, 2021	March 19, 2022	23	Based on a light novel by Asato Asato.	
Visual Prison	Tokyo MX	October 9, 2021	December 25, 2021	12	Original work by Noriyasu Agematsu.	
Kaguya-sama: Love Is War – Ultra Romantic	Tokyo MX	April 9, 2022	June 25, 2022	13	Sequel to Kaguya-sama: Love is War?	
Lycoris Recoil	Tokyo MX	July 2, 2022	September 24, 2022	13	Original work.	
Engage Kiss	Tokyo MX	July 3, 2022	September 25, 2022	13	Part of the multimedia project Project Engage by Aniplex.	
Nier: Automata Ver1.1a	Tokyo MX	January 8, 2023	September 27, 2024	24	Based on a video game by PlatinumGames.	
Mashle: Magic and Muscles	Tokyo MX	April 8, 2023	July 1, 2023	12	Based on a manga by Hajime Kōmoto.	
Hypnosis Mic: Division Rap Battle: Rhyme Anima+	Tokyo MX	October 7, 2023	December 26, 2023	13	Sequel to Hypnosis Mic: Division Rap Battle: Rhyme Anima.	
My New Boss Is Goofy	Tokyo MX	October 7, 2023	December 23, 2023	12	Based on a manga by Dan Ichikawa.	
Mashle: Magic and Muscles – The Divine Visionary Candidate Exam Arc	Tokyo MX	January 6, 2024	March 30, 2024	12	Sequel to Mashle: Magic and Muscles.	
Solo Leveling	Tokyo MX	January 7, 2024	March 31, 2024	12	Based on a Korean novel by Chugong.	
Too Many Losing Heroines!	Tokyo MX	July 14, 2024	September 29, 2024	12	Based on a light novel by Takibi Amamori.	
Sword Art Online Alternative: Gun Gale Online (season 2)	Tokyo MX	October 5, 2024	December 21, 2024	12	Sequel to Sword Art Online Alternative Gun Gale Online by 3Hz.	
Fate/Strange Fake	Tokyo MX	December 31, 2024	March 28, 2026	13	Based on a light novel by Ryōgo Narita.	
Solo Leveling: Arise from the Shadow	Tokyo MX	January 4, 2025	March 29, 2025	13	Sequel to Solo Leveling.	
Grow Up Show: Sunflower Circus	Tokyo MX	July 5, 2026	September 27, 2026	13	Original work. Co-production with Psyde Kick Studio.	
Bless	Fuji TV (Noitamina)	January 8, 2027	TBA	TBA	Based on a manga by Yukino Sonoyama.	
Mashle: Magic and Muscles – The Tri-Magicathlon Divine Visionary Final Exam Arc	Tokyo MX	January 10, 2027	TBA	TBA	Sequel to Mashle: Magic and Muscles – The Divine Visionary Candidate Exam Arc.	
Too Many Losing Heroines! (season 2)	Tokyo MX	TBA	TBA	TBA	Sequel to Too Many Losing Heroines!	

=== Films ===
Title	Release date	Director(s)	Ref.
Welcome to the Space Show	June 26, 2010	Koji Masunari	
Fairy Tail the Movie: Phoenix Priestess	August 18, 2012	Masaya Fujimori	
Blue Exorcist: The Movie	December 28, 2012	Atsushi Takahashi	
Saint Young Men	May 10, 2013	Noriko Takao	
Anohana: The Flower We Saw That Day	August 31, 2013	Tatsuyuki Nagai	
The Idolmaster Movie: Beyond the Brilliant Future!	January 25, 2014	Atsushi Nishigori	
Persona 3 The Movie: #2 Midsummer Knight's Dream	June 7, 2014	Tomohisa Taguchi	
Space Brothers #0	August 9, 2014	Ayumu Watanabe	
Persona 3 The Movie: #3 Falling Down	April 4, 2015	Keitaro Motonaga	
The Anthem of the Heart	September 19, 2015	Tatsuyuki Nagai	
Garakowa: Restore the World	January 9, 2016	Masashi Ishihama	
Persona 3 The Movie: #4 Winter of Rebirth	January 23, 2016	Tomohisa Taguchi	
Doukyusei: Classmates	February 20, 2016	Shōko Nakamura	
Black Butler: Book of the Atlantic	January 21, 2017	Noriyuki Abe	
Sword Art Online the Movie: Ordinal Scale	February 18, 2017	Tomohiko Itō	
Fairy Tail: Dragon Cry	May 6, 2017	Tatsuma Minamikawa	
The Seven Deadly Sins the Movie: Prisoners of the Sky	August 18, 2018	Noriyuki Abe (Chief); Yasuto Nishikata	
Uta no Prince-sama: Maji LOVE Kingdom	June 14, 2019	Jōji Furuta (Chief); Tomoka Nagaoka	
High School Fleet: The Movie	January 18, 2020	Yuu Nobuta (Chief); Jun Nakagawa	
Love Me, Love Me Not	September 18, 2020	Toshimasa Kuroyanagi	
Sword Art Online Progressive: Aria of a Starless Night	October 30, 2021	Ayako Kōno	
Uta no Prince-sama: Maji Love ST☆RISH Tours	September 2, 2022	Chika Nagaoka	
Sword Art Online Progressive: Scherzo of Deep Night	October 22, 2022	Ayako Kōno	
Kaguya-sama: Love Is War – The First Kiss That Never Ends	December 17, 2022	Mamoru Hatakeyama	
Lonely Castle in the Mirror	December 23, 2022	Keiichi Hara	
Uta no Prince-sama Taboo Night XXXX	May 9, 2025	Jōji Furuta (Chief); Akiko Seki	
Kusunoki no Bannin (co-produced with Psyde Kick Studio)	January 30, 2026	Tomohiko Itō	
Sword Art Online the Movie: Integral Domain (co-produced with Psyde Kick Studio)	2028	Shingo Adachi	
Eisen Flügel	TBA	Seiji Mizushima (Chief); Daizen Komatsuda	
Solo Leveling: Beyond the System	TBA	Tao Tojima	

=== OVAs ===
Title	Release date	Episodes
Birdy the Mighty: Decode – Cipher	July 22, 2009	1
The Idolmaster Shiny Festa	October 25, 2012	3
Saint Young Men	December 3, 2012 – August 23, 2013	2
Black Butler: Book of Murder	January 28, 2015 – February 25, 2015	2
Your Lie in April: Moments	May 15, 2015	1
The Seven Deadly Sins	June 17, 2015 – August 12, 2015	2
Blue Exorcist: Kyoto Saga	April 4, 2017 – October 4, 2017	2
Eromanga Sensei	January 16, 2019	2
Wotakoi: Love Is Hard for Otaku	March 29, 2019 – October 14, 2021	3
Kaguya-sama: Love Is War	May 19, 2021	1

=== Specials ===
Title	Release date	Episodes	Notes
Kannagi: Crazy Shrine Maidens	May 27, 2009	1	Production co-operation by Ordet.
Fairy Tail	April 15, 2011 – December 18, 2016	9	Episodes 1–6 co-produced with Satelight.
Valkyria of the Battlefield 3: The Wound Taken for Someone's Sake	June 29, 2011 – August 31, 2011	2	
Ore no Imōto ga Konna ni Kawaii Wake ga Nai.	August 18, 2013	1	
Sword Art Online: Extra Edition	December 31, 2013	1	
Brotherhood: Final Fantasy XV	March 30, 2016 – September 30, 2016	5	Based in the world and continuity of the 2016 video game, Final Fantasy XV. Co-production with Square Enix.
Persona 5: The Animation – The Day Breakers	September 3, 2016	1	
Shelter	October 18, 2016	1	Music video for American EDM musician Porter Robinson and French DJ Madeon.
Learn with Manga! Fate/Grand Order	December 31, 2018	1	Based in the world and continuity of the spin-off manga series by Riyo.
22/7: 8 + 3 = ?	September 16, 2020		
86	June 27, 2021 – March 6, 2022	4	
Uta no Prince-sama: Maji Love 1000%	July 31, 2022	1	
Fate/strange Fake: Whispers of Dawn	July 2, 2023	1	Based on a light novel by Ryōgo Narita.
Kaguya-sama: Love Is War – The Stairway to Adulthood	December 31, 2025	1	Based on a manga by Aka Akasaka.

=== Others ===
Title	Year	Notes
Namisuke	2007	
Ōkiku Furikabutte: Honto no Ace ni Nareru Kamo	2007	Nintendo DS game; Produced the animation and CG segments
Takane no Jitensha (a.k.a. Takane's Bike)	2008	winner of Animax's Animax Taishō award
Persona 4	2008	PlayStation 2 game; Produced the 2D animation with Studio Hibari
Valkyria Chronicles II	2010	PlayStation Portable game
Phoenix Wright: Ace Attorney − Spirit of Justice	2016	Nintendo 3DS, iOS, Android game
Radiant Historia: Perfect Chronology	2017	Nintendo 3DS game; Produced the opening animation
Layton's Mystery Journey	2017	Nintendo Switch, Nintendo 3DS, iOS, Android game
