= Starting Today, We're Childhood Friends =

Japanese manga series

- First tankōbon volume cover, featuring Kaede Yuzuki (front) and Kouhei Aida (back)

今日から始める幼なじみ (Kyō kara Hajimeru Osananajimi)
- Genre: Romantic comedy
- Manga
- Written by: Midori Obiya
- Published by: Shinchosha
- English publisher: NA: Comikey
- Imprint: Bunch Comics
- Magazine: Kurage Bunch
- Original run: April 20, 2021 – present
- Volumes: 17

Starting Today, We're Childhood Friends (Japanese: 今日から始める幼なじみ, Hepburn: Kyō kara Hajimeru Osananajimi) is a Japanese web manga series written and illustrated by Midori Obiya. It began serialization on Shinchosha's Kurage Bunch website in April 2021, and its chapters have been collected in 17 tankōbon volumes as of July 2026.

== Plot ==
Kaede Yuzuki, a transfer student, is Kouhei Aida's new neighbor, both at home and in the classroom. Kouhei tries to get friendly with her, but their conversations lead nowhere. However, Kaede always wished for a childhood friend, so one day she asks him to be her childhood friend, while she will be his, so they can start doing all the things that childhood friends should do.

== Media ==
=== Manga ===
Written and illustrated by Midori Obiya, Starting Today, We're Childhood Friends began serialization on Shinchosha's Kurage Bunch manga website on April 20, 2021. Its chapters have been collected in 17 tankōbon volumes as of July 2026. The series is licensed digitally in English by Comikey.

No.	Original release date	Original ISBN	English release date	English ISBN
1	October 8, 2021	978-4-10-772430-4	February 15, 2026	979-8-89220-217-6
1. "The Transferring Childhood Friend"; 2. "Good Morning, Childhood Friend"; 3. "Good Evening, Childhood Friend"; 4. "Studying with a Childhood Friend"; 5. "Walking with a Childhood Friend"; 6. "Soda with a Childhood Friend"; 7. "Secrets and a Childhood Friend"; 8. "Relationship with a Childhood Friend"; 9. "The Childhood Friend Next Door"; Bonus: "After Chapter 1"
2	February 9, 2022	978-4-10-772465-6	April 15, 2026	979-8-89220-227-5
10. "Secret Base and Childhood Friend"; 11. "Word Strings and Childhood Friend"; 12. "LINE Exchange and a Childhood Friend"; 13. "Chatting with a Childhood Friend"; 14. "Inviting a Childhood Friend"; 15. "Getting Along with a Childhood Friend"; 16. "School Uniforms and a Childhood Friend"; 17. "A Mosquito Bite and a Childhood Friend"; 18. "Books and a Childhood Friend"; 19. "Cookies and a Childhood Friend"; Bonus: "Another Detour"
3	May 9, 2022	978-4-10-772493-9	July 15, 2026	979-8-89220-240-4
20. "Childhood Friends and a Big Sister"; 21. "Childhood Friends and Volleyball"; 22. "Childhood Friends and Field Trips"; 23. "Childhood Friends and Lunch Boxes"; 24. "A Childhood Friend Oversleeps"; 25. "Childhood Friends and the Rain"; 26. "Childhood Friends and the Day Before the Test"; 27. "Childhood Friends and Meetings"; 28. "Childhood Friends and Scores"; Special chapter: "Childhood Friends and Cleaning"; Bonus: "Big Sister Revisited"
4	August 8, 2022	978-4-10-772523-3	October 15, 2026	979-8-89220-251-0
29. "Childhood Friends and an Outing"; 30. "Childhood Friends Getting Lost"; 31. "Childhood Friends and Fate"; 32. "Childhood Friends and Mama"; 33. "Childhood Friends and After School"; 34. "Childhood Friends and Rumors"; 35. "Childhood Friends and Changing Uniforms"; 36. "Childhood Friends and Club Activities"; 37. "Childhood Friends and Surprises"; 38. "Childhood Friends and Rainy Days"; Bonus: "After Chapter 30"; Bonus: "After Chapter 32"
5	November 9, 2022	978-4-10-772542-4	—	—
6	March 9, 2023	978-4-10-772581-3	—	—
7	June 8, 2023	978-4-10-772609-4	—	—
8	October 6, 2023	978-4-10-772656-8	—	—
9	January 9, 2024	978-4-10-772676-6	—	—
10	May 9, 2024	978-4-10-772712-1	—	—
11	September 9, 2024	978-4-10-772749-7	—	—
12	January 8, 2025	978-4-10-772785-5	—	—
13	May 9, 2025	978-4-10-772830-2	—	—
14	August 7, 2025	978-4-10-772859-3	—	—
15	December 9, 2025	978-4-10-772896-8	—	—
16	April 9, 2026	978-4-10-772932-3	—	—
17	July 9, 2026	978-4-10-772962-0	—	—
18	December 9, 2026	978-4-10-773010-7	—	—

=== Other ===
The series has had illustration collaborations with the Too Many Losing Heroines! light novel series by Takibi Amamori and Kono Manga no Heroine wa Morisaki Amane Desu manga series by Nekoguchi.

== Reception ==
The series was nominated for the eighth Next Manga Awards in 2022 in the web category.
