= Zenmai Zamurai =

Japanese anime television series

ぜんまいざむらい
- Genre: Adventure; Comedy; Fantasy
- Anime television series
- Directed by: Tetsuo Yasumi
- Produced by: Akira Yoshizawa; Masuo Ueda
- Written by: Hiroshi Ōnogi; Tetsuo Yasumi; Ryōta Yamaguchi et al
- Music by: Jun Miyake; SUN.SALT&TIME
- Studio: A-1 Pictures; Noside
- Original network: NHK E
- Original run: April 3, 2006 – March 26, 2010
- Episodes: 215

Zenmai Zamurai (ぜんまいざむらい) is a Japanese children's anime created by Momoko Maruyama and Ryōtarō Kuwamoto (m&k). It aired daily in the mornings and afternoons on NHK Educational TV in Japan. The series focuses on the main title character, Zenmai Zamurai, who lives in a small Japanese village known as Karakuri Oedo (からくり大江戸). Zenmai helps protect his friends and save his village against evil. The settings for the series mostly takes place during the Edo period of Japan over 200 years ago. Two short features were shown in the mornings and afternoons both five minutes long. Its exclusion from the 2010-11 NHK programming schedule signifies the end of its run on the station, but reruns for the series continued to air on the Hi-Vision BS premium channel until March 27, 2011. The series came back and aired on Kids Station until April 2011.

On December 31, 2006, three new episodes were broadcast as "New Year's Eve Special" with a longer opening theme song. The series was produced in standard image quality with an aspect ratio of 4:3. After April 2009, no new episodes were released, and on March 26, 2010, the series ended with over 215 episodes.

== Story ==
200 years ago, Zenmai Zamurai, who was originally named as Zennosuke (ぜんのすけ) at that time, was a thief by profession, but not a very skilled one. While stealing dumplings from a house one night, he saw a mouse and started to run away, but he fell down into a well and died. Luckily, he was resurrected by Daifuku-no-kami (大福の神), named as the God Of Fortune. A wind-up key, Zenmai (ぜんまい) is placed on Zennosuke's head. If the key winds down, Zennosuke dies. The only way the key can be wound is by Zennosuke doing good deeds over 108 times. Each one he does increases his lifespan, meaning that he can live longer. If he does it all, he will be released from his servitude to the god. In order to achieve this end, he is given the Dango-ken (だんご県), which is a sword with colorful Japanese Dumplings skewered onto it. Whenever Zenmai Zamurai sees people doing injustice or generally getting out of control, he uses his sword to shoot the dumplings into their mouths. When people eat the dumplings, they suddenly become happy and becomes good people again. He helps out everyone in many ways. Whenever he does well, a rainbow comes out of the sky to wind up his key. His name and the theme of the show is based on a short Japanese proverb, "Ichinichi Ichizen" (一日一膳), which means "Do a good deed daily".

== Characters ==
- Zenmai Zamurai (ぜんまいざむらい) – The main title character in the show. He is a young brave samurai who is very friendly but always knows when things are getting out of control. He lives at Dangoyababa's Ippuku Dumpling Shop with his best friend, Mamemaru. Zenmai loves to eat dumplings and sushi. He also has a fear of rats. Whenever he sees one, he begins to overreact and starts to get insomnia while sleeping. Zukin-chan is in love with him.
- Mamemaru (豆丸) – Zenmai's diminutive best friend and a ninja in training. He has the habit of wetting his bed while sleeping. Although he is not very good at landing from high buildings, he practices throwing shurikens during his spare time. He is short, but he wishes to be tall someday. He is the eldest son of his parents and three brothers and sisters in a family of five. He has a younger brother, Azukimaru (あずき丸), and a younger sister, Goma-chan (ごまちゃん).
- Zukin-chan (ずきんちゃん) – Zenmai's love interest and the main female character in the show. She's a good friend of Zenmai and they show a mutual affection towards each other. Her bonnet hides a large, brown afro, but she seems to not like the afro. She also doesn't like Namezaemon, who always forces to kiss her. She also has a pet dog named Botan (ボタン).
- Cha-jiji (茶じじ) – Zukin-chan's grandfather. He's very protective of her and has an eye on for the younger women of the village. When he was young, he was a swordsman who had won many swordsmanship tournaments. He likes to relax with a cup of tea on his red beret with his pet cat, Matcha (まっちゃ).
- Dangoyababa (だんごやばば) – An elderly woman who is the owner of the Ippuku Dumpling Shop. Whenever Mamemaru wets his own bed, she gets very strict about it. She has long lost her looks, but more often than not tries to act young and attractive, which is met with disgust by the men of the village.
- Namezaemon (なめざえもん) – Zenmai's rival and the main antagonist in the show. He is a rich aristocrat who has a sword with gold coins on it. He uses his gold coins as money and gets whatever he wants. He is very arrogant, selfish, and narcissistic. Most of the time, he fights with Zenmai whenever they meet each other, but sometimes, they are friends. He is in love with Zukin-chan and will do anything to get Zenmai out of the way. Namezaemon also has a mother named Namemama (なめママ).
- Nazonotengaiotoko (謎の天蓋男) – A mysterious man who wears a komusō. He was sent by Daifuku-no-kami to watch over Zenmai Zamurai from the shadows, and when he does his good deeds, he writes on the scroll, "Zenmai Zamurai will do good again today." Even though Zenmai doesn't do any good deeds, he still writes down that he still does well. He is one of the only characters to appear at every end of each episode.
- Pierre (町人ピエール) – An English teacher from Portugal. His spoken Japanese has a strange accent, but he studies hard and has quickly learned how to read and write in kanji, as well as how to say some very difficult tongue twisters. He also likes to eat sushi. Dangoyababa is in love with him. During his childhood, he had a friend named Alice (アリス), who can speak both English and Japanese. She also knows the entire English alphabet.
- Kamichiyo-san (かみちよねーさん) – A charming, nice woman who wears a lot of makeup. She is a teacher at a school who teaches everyone many things. She also stays inside a fortune telling box, where she tells people in the village where they can predict their fortune and give advice. Pierre is in love with her. She also has a pet fish named Kin-san (金さん).
- Akutoridaikan (あくとり代官) – A chef who always wished to remove evil in the world. He lets people in the village eat his ramen and udon. When he was young, he ate nothing but a large pot of udon.
- Daifuku-no-kami (大福の神) – A god who gave Zenmai a windup key and a dumpling sword. He told him that doing good deeds can wind up his key. He lives in the sky full of clouds. He always likes to rap, dance, and listen to music.
- Watāme-hime (わたあめひめ) – Daifuku-no-kami's niece. She cast spells to summon clouds. She also helps Zenmai whenever he's in trouble. She also gave him a rainbow Dango-ken sword with extra dumplings on it. The rainbow dumplings can turn others more happier when eaten. She also likes Namezaemon.
- Akutare Zamurai (アクタレざむらい) – An evil counterpart of Zenmai Zamurai. The wind-up key on his head is his big weakness. If he gets struck by lightning, the polarity of goodness inverts and he becomes the evil Akutare Zamurai. What he likes is causing mischief, playing pranks on, and makes life difficult for everyone. The dumplings on his sword also changes into slimy balls, which turn others evil when eaten. If he gets struck by lightning again, he turns back into Zenmai Zamurai.
