= Bless (manga) =

Japanese manga series

- First tankōbon volume cover

ブレス (Buresu)
- Manga
- Written by: Yukino Sonoyama
- Published by: Kodansha
- English publisher: NA: Kodansha USA
- Imprint: Magazine Edge KC (1–3); Sirius KC (4–)
- Magazine: Shōnen Magazine Edge (January 17, 2022 – October 17, 2023); Monthly Shōnen Sirius (December 25, 2023 – present)
- Original run: January 17, 2022 – present
- Volumes: 9
- Anime television series
- Directed by: Shōtarō Kitamura
- Written by: Fukurou Kamiza
- Music by: Ryō Yoshimata
- Studio: A-1 Pictures
- Licensed by: Crunchyroll
- Original network: FNS (Fuji TV)
- Original run: January 8, 2027 – scheduled
- Television drama
- Directed by: Izuru Kumasaka; Maki Tomita
- Written by: Satoko Okazaki; Ichirō Kusuno
- Studio: C & I Entertainment
- Licensed by: Amazon Prime Video
- Original run: Q2 2027 – scheduled
- icon

Bless (Japanese: ブレス, Hepburn: Buresu) is a Japanese manga series written and illustrated by Yukino Sonoyama. It began serialization in Kodansha's shōnen manga magazine Shōnen Magazine Edge in January 2022. After the final issue of the magazine was released in October 2023, it was transferred to the Monthly Shōnen Sirius magazine in December that same year. An anime television series adaptation produced by A-1 Pictures is set to premiere in January 2027. A live-action drama adaptation will be streamed worldwide on Amazon Prime Video in Q2 2027.

== Plot ==
At Aoiyama High, a high school known for producing up-and-coming students seeking to enter showbiz or become beauty professionals, first-year Aia Udagawa longs to be a makeup artist. However, he keeps his dream to himself because he is convinced he will not be good enough due to people disregarding his interest in it in the past. His classmate Jun Sumisaki longs to be a model, but she keeps her dream to herself because it is not how other people see her because of her timid nature and freckles. After being lumped into a team for their school's Aoi Con Festival, a high-profile runway show produced by the students, Aia and Jun finds themselves as stylist and model. Finding courage and inspiration in each other, Aia and Jun form a profound bond where they can reveal who they really are and gain the confidence to chase their dreams.

Following a successful show in Aoi Con, Aia is contacted by Hikaru "Daiya" Oya, a famous model who is also a successful hair and makeup artist that Aia idolizes and has a close connection to. Daiya pushes Aia to join Mirror, a new makeup school that Daiya and his fellow makeup artists created to teach their craft, allowing Aia to refine his skills along with his peers and meet other pros. Meanwhile, Jun tries to find modeling gigs, which leads to more collaborations with Aia and catching the eyes of respected veterans in the fashion industry. Together, Aia and Jun take on challenges of defying expectations and navigate an industry that upholds strict beauty standards and values talent over hard work.

== Characters ==
=== Protagonists ===
Aia Udagawa (宇田川 アイア, Udagawa Aia)
Voiced by: Tomohiro Ōno
Portrayed by: Ryusei Onishi (Naniwa Danshi)
An aspiring makeup artist, Aia has an unwavering passion for makeup and wishes to bless people through his artistry so they can gain the confidence to be their true, best selves. Aia is sensitive, empathetic, and kind, but tends to repress his emotions, which leads to moments of awkwardness, misunderstandings, or emotional outbursts. Aia also wrestles with numerous insecurities, exacerbated by his close yet complex relationship with Daiya. His love for makeup started in his second year of middle year, after being introduced to makeup by Daiya and desiring see the world the way his idol does, but lacks natural talent in it. As Aia is attractive and is a talented model, everyone around him believed he should stick just to modeling, with Daiya's opinions on the matter being largely ambiguous. Furthermore, Aia's admiration makes him wants to emulate Daiya and to reach his level, but he also resents living in Daiya's shadow. Beaten down by all this and perceiving Daiya did not cherish their bond as much as he did, Aia regulate makeup as a hobby until he befriends Jun, who reignited his passion.
As a makeup artist, Aia supplements his raw potential with his imagination, diligent studying, and practical work experience. His endearing enthusiasm for makeup and attentiveness to his models' feelings helps him think up creative ideas that impressive even pros. As Aia prove his worth in Mirror, he gains more confidence and become less unafraid of being hurt by other people's opinions.
Jun Sumisaki (炭崎 純, Sumisaki Jun)
Voiced by: Chiyuki Miura
An aspiring model, Jun is 5'10" tall and pretty, but is self-conscious about her height and freckles. Jun has dreamt about being a model since childhood and even practiced walking, but her timid nature and teasing from her peers causes Jun to be unsure about herself. Despite how freckles are usually viewed as unattractive, Jun takes pride in her freckles, as her parents always compared her to sunflowers growing up.
After meeting Aia, Jun gains confidence to actively apply to modelling gigs and hopes to travel abroad one day to find more jobs. While still anxious at times, Jun begins shows a bolder side, such as piercing her ears or buying a cellphone to promote herself, and has become more social with her classmates. Sweet and charming, Jun surrounds herself with many kind and supportive people, which also motivates her to work hard. She greatly treasures her friendship Aia and considers him the person that can bring out her beauty the best.

=== Mirror Academy ===
Initially founded as a workshop by Daiya and three other makeup artists to collaborate ideas and strive for innovation, but the success of the four founders' careers garners attention from many other makeup artists and other members of the fashion industry. Due to their sponsors, the workshop transforms into a makeup school for all ages and recently opened just six months prior in Shibuya. It is open on a walk-in basis, starting from five to nine on weekdays and all day on Saturdays, but closes on Sundays. The teachers rotates every day, taking turns to give lessons and lectures, with the lessons being free. However, the academy's principle of innovative means only the most talented and dedicated students are allows to stay, making it a small and exclusive group.

Hikaru "Daiya" Oya
Voiced by: Tarusuke Shingaki
A famous model and makeup artist, Daiya is one of Mirror's founders, a Aoiyama High alumni, and Aia's idol. While handsome, suave, and highly talented, Daiya has an enigmatic side and keeps his inner most thoughts to himself. Daiya first met Aia after picking him out the street crowd and requesting him to be a substitute partner for an event, which led Aia to becoming a model at Daiya's agency. They developed a very close relationship, and Daiya inspired Aia's love for makeup, even teaching him the basics. Even after Aia quit modeling and avoided him for a year, Daiya continues to care for Aia and is delighted to find out Aia has begun a serious pursuit of makeup. As he is usually busy with his career, Daiya rarely teaches at Mirror, but makes time to check on Mirror when he can. Daiya acts as an unofficial mentor to Aia, challenging him to join Mirror and sharpen his craft alongside his official protege, Akiharu. Daiya treats both boys fairly, imparting lessons about what it means to be a pro and poses challenges to them in an impartial manner. While he takes pride in Akiharu's talent and success, Daiya secretly displays more interest Aia's massive potential, believing in Aia even more than the teen himself, and happily watching over his growth.
Hiro Morinomiya
A famous makeup artist and one of Mirror's founders, he is the teacher that Aia's group typically has for lessons and tasks assignments. A patient, gentle, and approachable man, he dutiful and honestly teaches his students everything they need to be makeup pros. He is close to his student MM, as he first introduce MM to makeup and taught him in CE classes, and eventually getting him invited to Mirror.
Akiharu Nakano
Voiced by: Koki Uchiyama
A student, being the best one in the school, and Daiya's personal apprentice. Despite being only a high schooler, Akiharu is extremely skilled, being very creative, efficient, and high quality. Akiharu's interest in makeup started in his second year of middle school after doing makeup for his friend and volleyball team senpai, Minami, who secretly enjoys cross-dressing. Through Minami, Akiharu found enjoyment in making people beautiful and views as it a tool to help people be who they want be. Akiharu displays natural talent in makeup since the beginning and is style noted to be similar to Daiya's, with his only weakness being a minimal communicator towards his models. While outwardly stoic and cool, Akiharu has a flustered and passionate side that's normal for his age, especially whatever makeup or Daiya is concern. As he greatly idolizes Daiya and is eager for his approval, he sees Aia as a rival, being somewhat jealous of him, and seeks to prove that he is the better makeup artist, but he is very cordial to his peer.
Joe Osaki
Voiced by: Yoshiki Nakajima
A 21-years-old student, Joe is a whimsical, elusive, and smooth-talking mood-maker, who likes to teases his classmates. Joe uses his charm to operate a "side hustle" with Akiharu by offering random women free makeovers, so they can get hand-on practice, at Mirror. Joe has been interested in makeup since he was young, inspirated by the makeup people wore during Halloween. Joe sees makeup as an expression of the extraordinary, but his preferred style is view to be outlandish and feels alienated due to being mocked for his passion. Despite being best the student at his vocational school, his style also was not approved of and dropped out, causing him to practice his art by going to night clubs. After being taken in and encouraged by his mentor Takatsuki, Joe works hard to win people over to his vision of beauty.
Hajime "MM" Taguchi
Voiced by: Kentarō Kumagai
A student commonly refers as "MM" by his Mirror friends, given by the Sumeragi twins who saw his shirt's size tag since he was wearing it inside out when they first met. As the oldest of their group, MM is mature, warm, and brotherly to his younger peers, but struggles with feelings of inadequacy. While smart and practical, MM's humble upbringing and accommodating nature causes him to views himself more suited to be supportive pillar than a star. MM started doing makeup as a way to support his wife, who encourages to chase his dreams and shine in his own way. While MM's makeup style thoroughly covers the basics and has good quality, he largely sticks to everyday makeup.
Oroka Sumeragi
Voiced by: Yoshino Aoyama
A 20-years-old student, Oroko is the older Sumeragi twin and also works as a model, though she lately prioritizes learning the makeup. Proud and sharp-tongued, Oroko upholds strict standards of how things should done and is assertive in her opinions. In her pursuit to live beautifully, Oroko conducts herself earnestly and diligently in everything she does, though Shitataka notes that Oroka does not explain herself very well and comes off as standoffish. While only openly affectionate to her twin, Oroka is caring to her juniors at Mirror and considers them her friends, giving them pointers on how to improve.
Shitataka Sumeragi
Voiced by: Momoka Terasawa
A 20-years-old student, Shitataka is the younger Sumeragi twin and works as a model. Cheery and more laid-backed than Oroka, Shitataka is demure and typically goes along with whatever Oroka does, which including joining Oroka in learning about makeup. While she adores her twin, Shitataka is very self-aware, having her own sense of individuality, and is not afraid things do things she likes. Shitataka also displays certain quirks or interests that contradicting to her image, such having undercut hairstyle, which she considers as an expression of her own ego.
Ariake
A professional makeup artist and a member of Mirror's faculty. Very friendly and little eccentric.

=== Others ===
Mahjong Parlor Boss
Simply known as "Boss", he owns a mahjong parlor, where Jun works part-time, and is the chef that cooks the meals for customers. He known Jun since she was in the fifth grade and is a very good friend to her. Confident and tall, the Boss has an androgynous appearance and has a feminine style, such wearing makeup and heels. While a bit annoyed that Jun and Aia often uses his place as a personal hangout and treats it like a restaurant, he adores the two and typically let them do what they want.
Ginga Yoyogi
Voiced by: Nobuhiko Okamoto
A young makeup artist from Saga, Ginga recently graduated from high school and moved to Tokyo to jump-start his career. A self-made man, Ginga juggles working part-time and studying his craft by watching photo shoots and doing makeup for student films. He is promoted himself on social media before moving to Tokyo and is already making a name for himself as a rising star. Due to his rural upbringing, Ginga is determined to rise to the top and fiercely competitive to prove he can compete with the cutting-edge trends of Tokyo. While aggressive and blunt, Ginga becomes a sort of mentor to Aia and sometimes hires to be his assistant for work, allowing Aia to get some work experience.
Yoriko Sumisaki
Jun's loving and supportive mother, who works in the film industry. She taught Jun how to walk like a model when she was young and affectionately compares her to a sunflower. Like her daughter, Yoriko has freckles and is tall, but is much confident in herself and more outgoing than her. While she gets along with Jun's boss, she is banned from the parlor since she is too good at mahjong and chases away his customers.
Takuto Akasaka
Jun's father and a photographer, who died of pancreatic cancer when Jun very young. However, he has left a deep impact on his child as he always supportive of Jun's dreams to be a model and is generally very similar to her in personality, such as their determination to chase their dreams and doing things on impulse. Takuto also very carefree and blunt yet encouraging and loving man who loves sunrises and sunflowers.
Arina Himemiya
MM's sweet and capable wife, who is also the daughter of drug company owners. She and MM knew each other since they were children, as his father worked as a gardener for her family. She and MM both works for her family's company, with her as researcher to develop new drugs. Due to working late a lot, Arina's skin is often rough and has eyebags, which inspires MM to become interest in makeup as way to support her, and her husband usually does her makeup.
Tadashi Mori
A editor for a department that runs a women's fashion website. He is on good terms with Ginga, offering him jobs, and is first person that hires Aia, who he sees great talent in.
Akihiko Takatsuki
A highly respected and reputable hair stylist and makeup artist, he is Joe's mentor and boss. While seemingly formal and strict, Takastuki is very gentlemanly, humble, open-minded, and is considerate of others. Attentive and kind, Takatsuki excels at networking, creating wide circle of connections and is one of the most trusted pros in the beauty industry.
Yukiko Himuro
President and designer of her own apparel brand. While stern and intimidating, Himuro is fair, has a keen eye, and understands the value of hard work. She takes an interest Jun, who recognizes potential in and admires her spirit.
Mikado Ekuni
A 20-years-old tall and beautiful model, and Oroko's rival since their high school years, where they compete in school and modeling. Mikado's beauty, model status, and solitary demeanor makes her largely distant from her peers, with only Oroka being daring enough talk to her. Despite their prickly rivalry, Mikado feels kinship with Oroka, who presence keeps her from feeling lonely and motivates her to work hard.
Tamako Shinagawa
A aspiring makeup artist, Shinagawa is hyperactive, friendly, and childish. Despite being 20-years-old, her attitude and short height makes her looks a child, but her makeup skills are very good.
Kurieda
At 5'10 tall and a charming social butterfly, Kurieda is a popular model and is considers to be the top one in Japan, known by her stage name "Kurie". As a judge for the U21 Hair and Makeup competition, she takes an interest in Jun, going out of her way meet her and give her some advice.

== Media ==
=== Manga ===
Written and illustrated by Yukino Sonoyama, Bless began serialization in Kodansha's shōnen manga magazine Shōnen Magazine Edge on January 17, 2022. After the final issue of Shōnen Magazine Edge was published on October 17, 2023, the series was transferred to the Monthly Shōnen Sirius magazine on December 25, 2023. The series' chapters have been collected into nine tankōbon volumes as of October 2026.

During their Anime Expo 2023 panel, Kodansha USA announced that they licensed the series, with the first volume releasing in April 2024. The series is also available on Kodansha's K Manga website and app in the United States.

No.	Original release date	Original ISBN	North American release date	North American ISBN
1	August 17, 2022	978-4-06-528649-4	April 2, 2024	979-8-88877-179-2
1. I Have No Talent; 2. Late Bloomer; 3. Bless
2	October 17, 2022	978-4-06-529417-8	July 2, 2024	979-8-88877-180-8
4. High Heels at the Festival; 5. Training Grounds; 6. Hide and Seek; 7. Boiling Point
3	May 17, 2023	978-4-06-531719-8	October 1, 2024	979-8-88877-181-5
8. Urgency; 9. Barking in the Night; 10. Longing; 11. When Opportunity Knocks; Bonus Comic. Collar
4	December 7, 2023	978-4-06-533922-0	February 25, 2025	979-8-88877-276-8
12. Sunflower; 13. Spotlight; 14. Eve of the Festival; Bonus Comic. Shine
5	July 9, 2024	978-4-06-536068-2	June 24, 2025	979-8-88877-467-0
15. Meritocracy My Ass; 16. Everyone Has a Dream; 17. That's Just Not Me; 18. If it's Us
6	December 9, 2024	978-4-06-537685-0	December 23, 2025	979-8-88877-574-5
19. Afterward; 20. Departure; 21. I Wish; 22. To My Future Self
7	May 9, 2025	978-4-06-539376-5	February 10, 2026	979-8-88877-739-8
23. Let the Games Begin; 24. Grace Under Pressure; 25. In It to Win; 26. Mounting Obstacles
8	March 9, 2026	978-4-06-542388-2	April 13, 2027	979-8-90074-095-9
9	October 8, 2026	978-4-06-542796-5	—	—

=== Anime ===
An anime television series adaptation was announced on March 6, 2026. The series will be produced by A-1 Pictures and directed by Shōtarō Kitamura, with Takayuki Kikuchi serving as assistant director, Fukurou Kamiza handling series composition, Honoka Yokoyama designing the characters, and Ryō Yoshimata composing the music. It is set to premiere on January 8, 2027 on the Noitamina programming block on Fuji TV and its affiliates. Crunchyroll will stream the series. The ending theme song is "New Page", performed by Hikka.

=== Drama ===
A live-action drama adaptation was announced on August 28, 2026. The series will be directed by Izuru Kumasaka and Maki Tomita and written by Satoko Okazaki and Ichirō Kusuno, with C & I Entertainment as production studio. It will be streamed worldwide on Amazon Prime Video in Q2 2027.

== Reception ==
The series was nominated for the ninth Next Manga Awards in the print category in 2023, and was ranked eleventh out of 41 nominees. The series was also ranked fourteenth in Honya Club's Nationwide Bookstore Employees' Recommended Comics list in 2024.
