= Hikaru Tono =

Japanese voice actress (born 1996)

- 遠野 ひかる
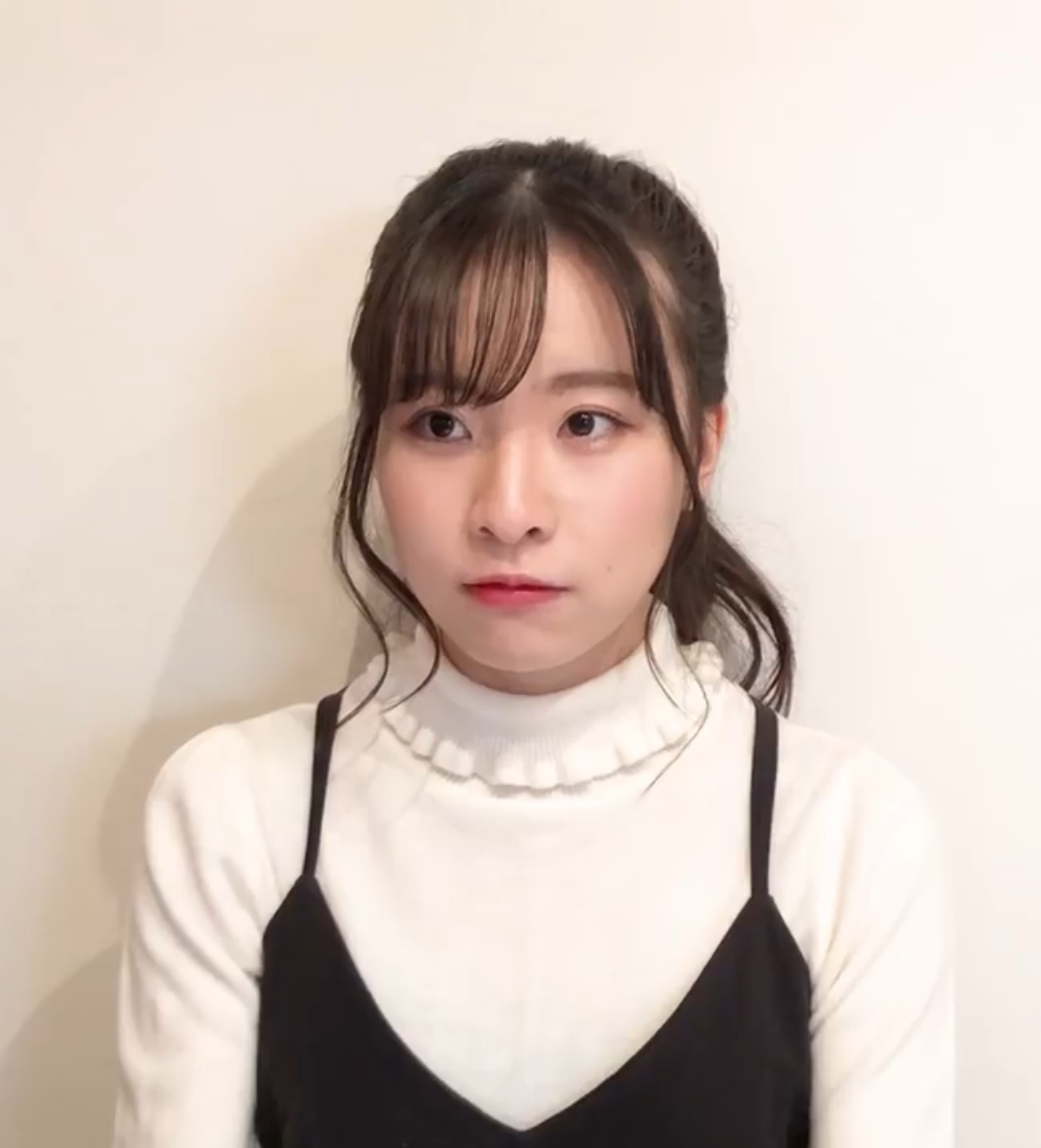
- Hikaru Tono in 2020
- Born: 5 March 1996 (age 30); Tokyo, Japan
- Occupation: Voice actress
- Years active: 2018–present
- Agent: Hibiki
- Notable work: Serena in Bermuda Triangle: Colorful Pastrale; Yujia Wang in Assault Lily; Sura in My Isekai Life; Howan in Show by Rock!! Mashumairesh!! Anna Yanami in Too Many Losing Heroines! Tribbie in Honkai: Star Rail
- Height: 154.6 cm (5 ft 1 in)

Hikaru Tono (遠野 ひかる, Tōno Hikaru; born 5 March 1996) is a Japanese voice actress affiliated with Hibiki. She is known for voicing Serena in Bermuda Triangle: Colorful Pastrale, Yujia Wang in Assault Lily, Sura in My Isekai Life, Suzuran in In the Heart of Kunoichi Tsubaki, Anna Yanami in Too Many Losing Heroines! and Matikanetannhauser in Umamusume: Pretty Derby.

== Biography ==
Hikaru Tono, a native of Tokyo, was born on 5 March 1996. As a young child, her father recommended being an announcer after hearing her read out her homework, so she vaguely considered voice-based occupations. As a teenager, she was part of a choir school club and was a competitor at a national chorus tournament. After spending seven years of unsuccessful auditions, she finally joined Hibiki, Bushiroad's talent agency, after passing their 2017 auditions for new voice actors.

In September 2018, she was cast as Serena in Bermuda Triangle: Colorful Pastrale. In October 2019, she was cast as Yujia Wang in Assault Lily Bouquet. In December 2020, she was cast as Matikanetannhauser in Umamusume: Pretty Derby, later reprising the role in the video game. In May 2021, she was cast as Eno in I've Been Killing Slimes for 300 Years and Maxed Out My Level. In November 2021, she was cast as Satina in Life with an Ordinary Guy Who Reincarnated into a Total Fantasy Knockout. In January 2022, she was cast as Sura in My Isekai Life. In March 2022, she was cast as Suzuran in In the Heart of Kunoichi Tsubaki. In August 2023, she was cast as Yuki in The Kingdoms of Ruin.

Tono is the actor for Yujia Wang, a character in Bushiroad's Assault Lily franchise. She portrayed the character in three of the franchise's stage plays: League of Gardens (2020), The Fateful Gift (2020), and Lost Memories (2022). She also reprised the role in the 2020 anime adaptation Assault Lily Bouquet and the 2021 game Assault Lily Last Bullet. Previously, she had starred as Mei Katarina Haneda in the 2018 stage play Assault Lily x Ludovic Girls Academy: Shiroki Resistance: Yakusoku no Yukue. She also voices Shiori Yumeoji in the game Revue Starlight: Re LIVE (also part of a Bushiroad franchise), and she portrayed her in the Revue Starlight stage plays The LIVE Edel Delight (2022) and Re LIVE Reading Theatre (2023).

She voices Howan as part of Mashumairesh!!, an in-universe singing unit in Sanrio's Show by Rock!! franchise. She voiced the character in the anime adaptation Show by Rock!! Mashumairesh!! and the game Show by Rock!! Fes A Live, and she performed in Mashumairesh!!'s 2021 single Trigger Rock.

In 2024, she voiced Towa in Studio Apartment, Good Lighting, Angel Included and Anna Yanami in Too Many Losing Heroines!. She also covered Hitomi's song "Love 2000", which was used as the first ending theme to Too Many Losing Heroines!.

== Filmography ==
=== Anime television series ===
2018

- Future Card Buddyfight, student A
- Ms. Vampire Who Lives in My Neighborhood, Asahi Aoki
- Zoids Wild, girl

2019

- BanG Dream!, Yoshiko Nono, classmate
- Bermuda Triangle: Colorful Pastrale, Serena
- Cautious Hero: The Hero Is Overpowered but Overly Cautious, dragon child
- High School Prodigies Have It Easy Even in Another World, child C
- Kemono Friends 2, Lesser Panda
- Kiratto Pri Chan, classmate
- Oresuki, Charisma-gun member
- Teasing Master Takagi-san, Misae

2020

- Assault Lily Bouquet, Yujia Wang
- D4DJ First Mix, schoolgirl
- Rebirth, Miyako Aizen
- Show by Rock!! Mashumairesh!!, Howan
- The Day I Became a God, Aira
- The Genie Family, girl

2021

- Cardfight!! Vanguard: Shinemon, Misaki Tokura, deputy manager
- Cardfight!! Vanguard: overDress, Tomari Seto
- I-Chu, Akira's fan
- Umamusume: Pretty Derby, Matikanetannhauser
- World's End Harem, Mimi Mannen

2022

- Cue!, child actor
- In the Heart of Kunoichi Tsubaki, Suzuran
- I've Been Killing Slimes for 300 Years and Maxed Out My Level, Eno
- Life with an Ordinary Guy Who Reincarnated into a Total Fantasy Knockout, Satina
- My Isekai Life, Sura
- Romantic Killer, Ayami
- Smile of the Arsnotoria, Midrasim
- SSSS.Dynazenon, Kaneishi
- To Your Eternity, Ushio

2023

- Don't Toy with Me, Miss Nagatoro 2nd Attack, Rabi-chan
- Gekijōban Argonavis Axia, young Nayuta Asahi
- Is It Wrong to Try to Pick Up Girls in a Dungeon?, Asta Knox
- The Kingdoms of Ruin, Yuki
- UniteUp!, Young Chihiro

2024

- Murder Mystery of the Dead, Murumuru
- Rinkai!, Momoka Tamano
- Studio Apartment, Good Lighting, Angel Included, Towa
- Too Many Losing Heroines!, Anna Yanami

2025

- Alma-chan Wants to Be a Family!, Toki Kamisato
- Even Given the Worthless "Appraiser" Class, I'm Actually the Strongest, Yūri
- Ganglion, Yumiko
- Mono, Sakurako Shikishima

2026

- Medalist 2nd Season, Kurumi Risu
- Mistress Kanan Is Devilishly Easy, Miel Zebul
- Rooster Fighter, Sara
- Magical Explorer, Rina Katō
- Tetsuryō! Meet with Tetsudō Musume, Shia Kasukabe

2027

- Everyone's Darling Has a Secret, Rei Kuromiya

=== Original net animation ===
2019

- Taeko no Nichijou, Anezaki-chan

2021

- The Missing 8, Poppy

=== Anime films ===
2026

- Shiboyugi: Playing Death Games to Put Food on the Table – 44: Cloudy Beach, Mozuku

=== Dubs ===
- Firebuds, Violet

=== Video games ===
2018

- Kemono Friends Pavilion, Lucky Beast Type-III
- Revue Starlight: Re LIVE, Shiori Yumeoji

2020

- Azur Lane, Nürnberg
- Show by Rock!! Fes A Live, Howan

2021

- Assault Lily Last Bullet, Yujia Wang
- Disney Twisted-Wonderland, young Vil Schoenheit
- Umamusume: Pretty Derby, Matikanetannhauser

2022

- Echoes of Mana, Kirte
- Heaven Burns Red, Rumi

2023

- White Cat Project, Selpina
- Crymachina, Enoa

2025

- Honkai: Star Rail, Tribbie/Trianne/Trinnon/Tribios
- Aether Gazer, Wadjet
- Cookie Run: Kingdom, Agar Agar Cookie
- Guardian Tales, Soul Mage Dohwa
- Haze Reverb, Dorothy
- Starseed: Asnia Trigger, Kaito.aile, Lynette
- Trails in the Sky 1st Chapter, Dorothy Hyatt

2026

- BanG Dream! Our Notes, Shizuku Shinomiya

=== Stage plays ===
2018

- Assault Lily x Ludovic Girls Academy: Shiroki Resistance: Yakusoku no Yukue, Mei Katarina Haneda

2020

- Assault Lily: League of Gardens, Yujia Wang
- Assault Lily: The Fateful Gift, Yujia Wang

2022

- Assault Lily: Lost Memories, Yujia Wang
- Revue Starlight: The LIVE Edel Delight, Shiori Yumeoji

2023

- Revue Starlight: Re LIVE Reading Theatre, Shiori Yumeoji
