= Momoka Terasawa =

Japanese voice actress

- 寺澤 百花
- Born: September 18; Chiba Prefecture, Japan
- Occupation: Voice actress
- Years active: 2018–present
- Agent: Sigma Seven (Affiliated with the subsidiary Sigma Seven e from April 1, 2018, to January 4, 2026.)

Momoka Terasawa (寺澤 百花, Terasawa Momoka; born September 18) is a Japanese voice actress who is affiliated with Sigma Seven. She is known for her roles as Yuzu Hanaoka in Blue Archive, Gakuto Yuzuki in The Yuzuki Family's Four Sons, Chika Komari in Too Many Losing Heroines! and Vivi Hachioji in Himitsu no AiPri.

== Career ==
Terasawa's interest in voice acting began during her first year of junior high school after performing a puppet show. The positive reception to her performance inspired her to pursue voice acting as a career. After a period of straining, she began her career in 2018, becoming affiliated with the talent agency Sigma Seven. In 2021, she was cast as Yuzu Hanaoka in the mobile game Blue Archive. In 2023, Terasawa played her first main role in an anime series as Gakuto Yuzuki in The Yuzuki Family's Four Sons. In 2024, she voiced Chika Komari in Too Many Losing Heroines!. She also sang a cover of Yui's song "Feel My Soul", which serves as the series' third ending theme.

== Filmography ==
=== Anime ===
2023

- The Yuzuki Family's Four Sons, Gakuto Yuzuki

2024

- Sound! Euphonium, Kaho Hariya
- Too Many Losing Heroines!, Chika Komari

2025

- Himitsu no AiPri: Ring-hen, Vivi Hachioji
- Milky Subway: The Galactic Limited Express, Chiharu Kujo

2026

- The Case Book of Arne, Elise
- Mao, Otoya
- Ichijyoma Mankitsu Gurashi!, Michika Narumi
- Dara-san of Reiwa, Kaoru Misogiya
- Please Excuse My Younger Brothers, Rui Narita
- The Ogre's Bride, Sou
- My Stepmother and Stepsisters Aren't Wicked, Koyuki Inari
- Chiikawa the Movie: The Secret of the Mermaid Island as Hitoha

2027

- Bless as Shitataka Sumeragi
- No-Clipping My Way to Supremacy! as Elelet

=== Web anime ===
2026

- Negative Happy, Momo/Momo Miyachika
- Cyberpunk: Edgerunners 2, Roman Carax

=== Games ===
2021

- Blue Archive as Yuzu Hanaoka
