= Engage Kiss =

Japanese media franchise

- Key visual
- Genre: Romantic comedy
- Created by: Aniplex
- Manga
- Written by: Itachi
- Published by: Square Enix
- Magazine: Manga Up!
- Original run: July 2, 2022 – March 27, 2024
- Volumes: 2
- Anime television series
- Directed by: Tomoya Tanaka
- Written by: Fumiaki Maruto
- Music by: Yoshiaki Fujisawa
- Studio: A-1 Pictures
- Licensed by: NA: Aniplex of America
- Original network: Tokyo MX, GYT, GTV, ABC, Mētele, BS11, AT-X
- Original run: July 3, 2022 – September 25, 2022
- Episodes: 13
- Video game

Engage Kill
- Developer: Square Enix
- Publisher: Square Enix
- Music by: Mirai Kodai Gakudan; Yoshiaki Fujisawa
- Genre: Action RPG
- Platform: Android, iOS
- Released: JP: March 1, 2023
- icon

Engage Kiss is a Japanese mixed-media project created by Aniplex. It consists of a manga series, which was serialized in Manga Up! from July 2022 to March 2024, and an anime television series produced by A-1 Pictures and written by Fumiaki Maruto, with character designs by Tsunako, which aired from July to September 2022. An action RPG mobile game follow-up and sequel was developed by Square Enix under the title Engage Kill was released in March 2023.

== Plot ==
Bayron City, an artificial island located in the Pacific Ocean near Japan, is troubled by the mysterious appearance of demons. To conceal their existence from the public, the city government hires PMCs that combat and neutralize demon-like monsters called "D-Hazards".

One such PMC called "I&S Office" is run by the protagonist, Shu Ogata. Differing from other PMCs, Shu's only employee is a demon girl named Kisara. Kisara has the appearance of a young girl despite being hundreds of years old, and her combat strength is highly rated. Though Shu does little work and is constantly in need of money, Kisara seems affectionate for him and toils to support him.

Despite Shu's close ties to Kisara, he frequently contacts his ex-girlfriend Ayano Yugiri for help. Ayano and Shu used to work for the same PMC called "AAA Defender Co." until their breakup and Shu's departure from AAA. Ayano claims that their relationship has ended, yet she still gives in to Shu's pleas for help.

Shu appears to be a loser whose livelihood depends on his relationships with two women. However, he has an ambitious goal: to uncover the truth behind the D-Hazard incident long ago in which his parents and sister went missing.

== Characters ==
=== Engage Kiss ===
==== Main characters ====
Shu Ogata (緒方 シュウ, Ogata Shū)
Voiced by: Soma Saito (Japanese); Howard Wang (English)
The protagonist who runs a small PMC, I&S Office. He is usually broke as he cannot handle finances well. He is an orphan, as his parents are presumed to be dead after an incident prior to the events of the series. He still has feelings for his first ex-girlfriend Ayano Yugiri, despite their break-up.
Kisara (キサラ)
Voiced by: Saya Aizawa (Japanese); Kayli Mills (English)
A young girl who goes to a high school in Bayron City. She is actually a demon girl who is hundreds of years old. She has the ability to eat the memories of people, including Shu.
Ayano Yugiri (夕桐 アヤノ, Yugiri Ayano)
Voiced by: Lynn (Japanese); Suzie Yeung (English)
Shu's first ex-girlfriend. Although she and Shu have broken up, she still has feelings for him. She is also Akino's daughter and a member of AAA Defender Co. She is slightly older than Shu, and they met when they were both children.
Sharon Holygrail (シャロン・ホーリーグレイル, Sharon Hōrīgureiru)
Voiced by: Rumi Okubo (Japanese); Anairis Quiñones (English)
Shu's second ex-girlfriend, who dresses as a nun of the Seiten Church. She is actually an assassin and a part of an international organization tasked with fighting against D-Hazards.
Kanna Ogata (緒方 カンナ, Ogata Kanna)
Voiced by: Akari Kitō (Japanese); Lisa Reimold (English)
Shu's younger sister. She is also a part-demon girl. Later on in the series, she is freed from an underground area where she was trapped, but ends up fighting Kisara and the others due to her powers. After she is defeated she starts living with Shu.

==== Other characters ====
Akino Yūgiri (夕桐 アキノ, Yūgiri Akino)
Voiced by: Akeno Watanabe (Japanese); Dawn M. Bennett (English)
Ayano's mother and the chairman of AAA Defender Co. She was previously Shu's boss, and continues to support him even after his departure from her company.
Miles Morgan (マイルズ・モーガン, Mairuzu Mōgan)
Voiced by: Kenichirou Matsuda (Japanese); Bill Butts (English)
A private military officer in Bayron City. Shu looked up to him as a father figure, but later on he became possessed by demons and tries to assassinate Shu.
Tetsuya Mikami (三上 テツヤ, Mikami Tetsuya)
Voiced by: Yoshiaki Hasegawa (Japanese); Mark Whitten (English)
Shenhua Hachisuka (蜂須賀 莎花, Hachisuka Shenfa)
Voiced by: Aya Uchida (Japanese); Courtney Lin (English)
The deputy mayor of Bayron City and the eldest daughter of the city mayor.
Linhua Hachisuka (蜂須賀 凛花, Hachisuka Rinfa)
Voiced by: Saori Ōnishi (Japanese); Abby Trott (English)
Mikhail Hachisuka (蜂須賀 ミハイル, Hachisuka Mihairu)
Voiced by: Ryōta Ōsaka (Japanese); Beau Bridgland (English)

=== Engage Kill ===
==== Rising Sun Military Corps ====
Chloe Tang (クロエ･タン, Kuroe Tan)
Voiced by: Arisa Kōri
She comes from a rich family and is the player's first employee at their PMC. Despite her calm and comoposed personality, she is a member of the Rising Sun Military Corps who possesses superhuman combat abilities. However, she has a big appetite and gets hungry easily. Since she was 11 years old, she has traveled extensively and experienced a tumultuous life of many ups and downs.
Shiho Takenouchi (竹ノ内 志保, Takenouchi Shiho)
Voiced by: Minami Tsuda
A Japanese woman who works in an administrative role at the Rising Sun Military Corps. In the past, she worked for a shady company where she had to do many repetitive tasks. This has made her unsure of herself, but she is actually skilled and can handle different accounting and everyday tasks effectively.
Aoi Kotobuki (寿 葵, Kotobuki Aoi)
Voiced by: Yukiyo Fujii
She used to be employed by a PMC in North America and frequently takes charge during combat operations. Prior to joining the Rising Sun Military Corps, she was unaware of the existence of demons due to the censorships of the Bayron City authorities. She has a serious and unemotional personality, and often lacks awareness of things that are not directly related to training or fighting.
Emilio Romero Álvarez (エミリオ・ロメロ・アルバレス, Emirio Romero Arubarezu)
Voiced by: Toshiki Masuda
A man who collects information for the Rising Sun Military Corps. He comes from Bayron City's Old Town. In the past, he was involved in illegal activities and he has strong ties to the hidden world of the city. As part of his information-gathering work, he frequently visits various restaurants in the city, which has turned him into a connoisseur of its exquisite food.
Noel (ノエル, Noeru)
Voiced by: Emiri Iwai
A mechanic employed by the Rising Sun Military Corps. She is of mixed American and Indian heritage. Despite often being mistaken for a child, she is actually 19 years old. She feels uneasy around others and acquired her exceptional engineering abilities by spending time alone, tinkering with and repairing machines. She is not typically talkative, but when the conversation revolves around her interests and mechanical creations, she becomes extremely chatty and speaks rapidly in a nerdy manner. She has developed an AI-powered drone called Humpty.

== Media ==
=== Anime ===
The anime was first labeled as "Project Engage", which listed Fumiaki Maruto (author of Saekano) and Tsunako (Date A Live illustrator) as the main staff. The details were then announced through the Aniplex booth at the AnimeJapan 2022 event. The series, titled Engage Kiss, is produced by A-1 Pictures and directed by Tomoya Tanaka, with Shunsaku Yano in charge of world setting, Shinpei Wada adapting Megumi Katagiri's demon designs for animation, and Yoshiaki Fujisawa composing the music. It aired from July 3 to September 25, 2022, on Tokyo MX and other channels. (Note: Tokyo MX lists the series premiere at 24:30 on July 2, 2022, which is effectively 12:30 a.m. JST on July 3.) The opening theme song, "Everyone, Scramble" (誰彼スクランブル, Dare-kare Sukuranburu), is performed by Halca. The ending theme song, "Love-Brain" (恋愛脳, Renai-Nō), is performed by Nanawo Akari. Aniplex of America licensed the series for an English simulcast and simuldub on Crunchyroll outside of Asia.

==== Episodes ====
| No. | Title | Directed by | Written by | Storyboarded by | Original release date |
|---|---|---|---|---|---|
| 1 | "A Loser and a Demon and a Man and a Woman"; Transliteration: "Kuzu to Akuma to Otoko to Onna" (Japanese: クズと悪魔と男と女) | Yoshitsugu Kimura | Fumiaki Maruto | Tomoya Tanaka | July 3, 2022 |
| 2 | "The Island of Desire"; Transliteration: "Yokubō ni Ukabu Shima" (Japanese: 欲望に浮かぶ島) | Tetsuya Akutsu | Fumiaki Maruto | Tetsuya Akutsu | July 10, 2022 |
| 3 | "The Slightest Terrible Cost"; Transliteration: "Honno Wazuka na Hidoi Daishō" (Japanese: ほんの僅かな酷い代償) | Mitsutoshi Satō; Tomoya Tanaka | Fumiaki Maruto | Akira Yamada | July 17, 2022 |
| 4 | "Unobtainable Lingering"; Transliteration: "Ubai Kirenai Miren" (Japanese: 奪い切れない未練) | Kōta Mori | Fumiaki Maruto | Takao Abo | July 24, 2022 |
| 5 | "Fleeting Scars"; Transliteration: "Utakata no Tsumeato" (Japanese: うたかたの爪痕) | Yūsuke Kubo | Fumiaki Maruto | Yūsuke Kubo | July 31, 2022 |
| 6 | "Third-Party Demon Killer"; Transliteration: "Akuma-goroshi no Daisansha" (Japanese: 悪魔殺しの第三者) | Masahiko Suzuki | Fumiaki Maruto; Ryūichi Ishida | Naomi Nakayama | August 7, 2022 |
| 7 | "But It's Okay, That's Enough"; Transliteration: "Dakedo Ii, Sore de Ii" (Japanese: だけどいい、それでいい) | Toshihiro Maeya | Fumiaki Maruto; Ryūichi Ishida | Ikuo Morimoto | August 14, 2022 |
| 8 | "The Unwanted Truth"; Transliteration: "Nozonde Nakatta Shinjitsu" (Japanese: 望んでなかった真実) | Yoshitsugu Kimura | Fumiaki Maruto | Takuya Asaoka | August 21, 2022 |
| 9 | "Without Understanding the Tears Shed"; Transliteration: "Nagasu Namida no Imi o Shirazu ni" (Japanese: 流す涙の意味を知らずに) | Tetsuya Akutsu | Fumiaki Maruto | Tetsuya Akutsu | August 28, 2022 |
| 10 | "High Hopes for the Worst Case"; Transliteration: "Machinozonda Saiaku" (Japanese: 待ち望んだ最悪) | Yūya Horiuchi | Fumiaki Maruto | Atsushi Ōtsuki | September 4, 2022 |
| 11 | "Gentle Foolish Lies"; Transliteration: "Yasashiku Orokana Uso" (Japanese: 優しく愚かな嘘) | Takashi Sakuma | Fumiaki Maruto | Takashi Sakuma | September 11, 2022 |
| 12 | "Believe in Him"; Transliteration: "Kare o Shinjite" (Japanese: 彼を信じて) | Kōta Mori | Fumiaki Maruto | Kōta Mori | September 18, 2022 |
| 13 | "Unresolved Grand Finale"; Transliteration: "Mikaiketsu de Daidanen" (Japanese: 未解決で大団円) | Tomoya Tanaka; Yūsuke Kubo | Fumiaki Maruto | Tomoya Tanaka | September 25, 2022 |

=== Manga ===
A manga adaptation of Engage Kiss by Itachi was serialized in Square Enix's online manga magazine Manga Up! from July 2, 2022, to March 27, 2024.

| No. | Japanese release date | Japanese ISBN |
|---|---|---|
| 1 | February 7, 2023 | 978-4-7575-8384-9 |
| 2 | June 7, 2024 | 978-4-7575-9172-1 |

=== Game ===
An action RPG mobile game developed by Square Enix titled Engage Kill was announced on April 24, 2022. A pre-registration began on June 4, 2022, and it was released in Japan on March 1, 2023. The game is a free-to-play RPG genre title with in-app purchases. The game ended service on March 21, 2024.

== See also ==
- Saekano, a light novel series authored by Fumiaki Maruto
- Date A Live, a light novel series illustrated by Tsunako
- King's Proposal, a light novel series illustrated by Tsunako
- Haganai, a light novel series with a manga adaptation illustrated by Itachi
- Too Many Losing Heroines!, a light novel series with a manga adaptation illustrated by Itachi
