= Life with an Ordinary Guy Who Reincarnated into a Total Fantasy Knockout =

Japanese manga series

- First volume cover, featuring Tachibana and Jinguji

異世界美少女受肉おじさんと (Fantajī Bishōjo Juniku Ojisan to)
- Genre: Comedy; Isekai
- Manga
- Written by: Yū Tsurusaki
- Illustrated by: Shin Ikezawa
- Published by: Cygames; Shogakukan
- English publisher: NA: Seven Seas Entertainment
- Imprint: Cycomi × Ura Sunday
- Magazine: Cycomi
- Original run: November 18, 2019 – present
- Volumes: 19
- Anime television series
- Directed by: Sayaka Yamai
- Written by: Toshimitsu Takeuchi; Masanao Akahoshi
- Music by: Takeshi Watanabe
- Studio: OLM Team Yoshioka
- Licensed by: Crunchyroll (streaming); SA/SEA: Medialink
- Original network: TV Tokyo, BS TV Tokyo
- English network: SEA: Animax Asia
- Original run: January 12, 2022 – March 30, 2022
- Episodes: 12
- icon

Life with an Ordinary Guy Who Reincarnated into a Total Fantasy Knockout (異世界(ファンタジー)美少女受肉おじさんと, Fantajī Bishōjo Juniku Ojisan to; "With a Fogie Reincarnated as a Pretty Fantasy Girl"), abbreviated as Fabiniku (ファ美肉), is a Japanese manga series written by Yū Tsurusaki and illustrated by Shin Ikezawa. It has been serialized online via Cygames' Cycomi manga app and website since November 2019, with its chapters collected in 19 tankōbon volumes by Shogakukan as of November 2026. An anime television series adaptation produced by OLM aired from January to March 2022.

== Plot ==
Hinata Tachibana and Tsukasa Jinguji are childhood friends. One day, when Hinata drunkenly wishes he was a girl, the Goddess of Love and Beauty appears and grants his wish before transporting him and Jinguji to a fantasy world and charging them to defeat the demon lord. Jinguji is provided with superhuman strength and various skills, while Hinata has almost nothing except for supernatural beauty that entices men. The two make their way through this world while struggling with their growing feelings for each other.

== Characters ==
Hinata Tachibana (橘 日向, Tachibana Hinata)
Voiced by: M.A.O (female), Kent Itō (male) (Japanese); Laura Stahl (female), Khoi Dao (male) (English)
Tsukasa Jinguji (神宮寺 司, Jingūji Tsukasa)
Voiced by: Satoshi Hino (Japanese); J. Michael Tatum (English)
Goddess of Love and Beauty (愛と美の女神, Ai to Bi no Megami)
Voiced by: Rie Kugimiya (Japanese); Jamie Marchi (English)
Telolilo Lilili Lu (ティロリロ・リリリ・ルー, Tiroriro Ririri Rū)
Voiced by: Yukiyo Fujii (Japanese); Suzie Yeung (English)
Satina (サテイナ, Sateina)
Voiced by: Hikaru Tono (Japanese); Molly Zhang (English)
Ultina (ウルティナ, Urutina)
Voiced by: Amane Shindō
Schwartz von Liechtenstein Lohengramm (シュバルツ・フォン・リヒテンシュタイン・ローエングラム, Shubarutsu fon Rihitenshutain Rōenguramu)
Voiced by: Kaito Ishikawa (Japanese); Dallas Reid (English)
Lucius (ルシウス, Rushiusu)
Voiced by: Eri Kitamura (Japanese); Terri Doty (English)
Shen (シェン)
Voiced by: Junichi Suwabe (Japanese); Aaron Campbell (English)
Muria (ムリア)
Voiced by: Yu Serizawa (Japanese); Julia Gu (English)
Ugraine (ユグレイン, Yugurein)
Voiced by: Yui Makino (Japanese); Natalie Hoover (English)
Narrator (ナレーション, Narēshon)
Voiced by: Masashi Ebara (Japanese); Chris Guerrero (English)

== Media ==
=== Manga ===
The manga series is written by Yū Tsurusaki and illustrated by Shin Ikezawa. It has been serialized online via Cygames' manga website Cycomi since November 18, 2019. Shogakukan is publishing the series in tankōbon volumes. The first volume was released on April 17, 2020. As of November 18, 2026, 19 volumes have been released. It is set to end with its 20th volume.

In North America, the manga is licensed by Seven Seas Entertainment.

==== Volumes ====
No.	Original release date	Original ISBN	English release date	English ISBN
1	April 17, 2020	978-4-09-850102-1	September 12, 2023	979-8-88843-011-8
2	September 18, 2020	978-4-09-850254-7	November 28, 2023	979-8-88843-065-1
3	February 19, 2021	978-4-09-850444-2	April 9, 2024	979-8-88843-365-2
4	May 19, 2021	978-4-09-850541-8	August 6, 2024	979-8-88843-476-5
5	October 18, 2021	978-4-09-850656-9	December 3, 2024	979-8-89160-047-8
6	January 19, 2022	978-4-09-850778-8	April 1, 2025	979-8-89160-559-6
7	June 17, 2022	978-4-09-851093-1	August 5, 2025	979-8-89373-565-9
8	November 17, 2022	978-4-09-851379-6	December 2, 2025	979-8-89373-566-6
9	April 18, 2023	978-4-09-851558-5	April 7, 2026	979-8-89373-664-9
10	July 19, 2023	978-4-09-852545-4	August 4, 2026	979-8-89561-372-6
11	December 19, 2023	978-4-09-853067-0	December 8, 2026	979-8-89561-373-3
12	April 18, 2024	978-4-09-853231-5	—	—
13	August 19, 2024	978-4-09-853514-9	—	—
14	December 19, 2024	978-4-09-853787-7	—	—
15	April 17, 2025	978-4-09-854063-1	—	—
16	September 19, 2025	978-4-09-854227-7	—	—
17	February 19, 2026	978-4-09-854420-2	—	—
18	June 19, 2026	978-4-09-854633-6	—	—
19	November 18, 2026	978-4-09-854873-6	—	—

=== Anime ===
An anime television series adaptation was announced on May 17, 2021. It is produced by OLM and directed by Sayaka Yamai, with Toshimitsu Takeuchi handling the series' scripts, Aoi Yamato designing the characters, and Takeshi Watanabe composing the music. It aired from January 12 to March 30, 2022, on TV Tokyo and BS TV Tokyo. (Note: TV Tokyo list the series premiere at 24:00 JST on January 11, 2022, which is effectively January 12 at midnight.) The opening theme song is "Akatsuki no Salaryman" (Salaryman at Dawn) by Yoshiki Fukuyama, while the ending theme song is "FA'NTASY to!" by Luce Twinkle Wink. Crunchyroll streamed the series outside of Asia. Medialink licensed the series in Southeast Asia, South Asia, and Oceania minus Australia and New Zealand.

On July 20, 2022, Crunchyroll announced that the series will receive an English dub, which premiered the following day.

==== Episodes ====
No.	Title	Directed by (Note: Information is taken from the ending credits of each episode.)	Written by	Storyboarded by	Original release date
1	"A Guy Who Reincarnated as a Fantasy Knockout and Another Guy"; Transliteration: "Fabiniku Ojisan to Ojisan" (Japanese: ファ美肉おじさんとおじさん)	Norio Nitta	Toshimitsu Takeuchi	Sayaka Yamai	January 12, 2022
Hinata Tachibana and Tsukasa Jinguuji are childhood friends. Hinata wants a girlfriend but is ignored by women due to Jinguuji being handsome and yet Jinguuji doesn't trust women. Hinata drunkenly wishes he was a woman. A Goddess of Love appears and kills Hinata. Jinguuji awakens in a new world and realizes Hinata has been transformed into a pretty girl. Goddess reincarnated them to be Heroes and defeat a Demon Lord, even transforming Hinata into a girl like he wished. Jinguuji is furious his friend is female and refuses to obey, so Goddess curses them with a desire to save the world. They separately realize they are attracted to each other but hide it from each other. Hinata attempts to discover if Jinguuji likes her but is thwarted, whereas Jinguuji finds the mix of Hinata's personality in a female body enticing but is determined not to fall in love. A creature appears, forcing them to flee with Jinguuji carrying Hinata. Jinguuji defeats the creature with one punch, revealing they have stats and skills. Jinguuji is a high level fighter while Hinata has almost nothing except her beauty. Experimenting, Jinguuji uses one of his skills, causing a modern looking door to appear before them.
2	"A Guy Who Reincarnated as a Fantasy Knockout and Unparalleled Beauty"; Transliteration: "Fabiniku Ojisan to Zessei no Bibō" (Japanese: ファ美肉おじさんと絶世の美貌)	Hong Penny	Toshimitsu Takeuchi	Norio Nitta	January 19, 2022
The door leads to a replica of Hinata's house. They eat the only food there and Hinata changes into her sister's dress. They go to a village and find it being attacked by bandits. The bandits all fall in love with Hinata and fight over her, knocking themselves out. The villagers start worshiping Hinata like a goddess. The tied up bandits reveal they are just the first wave, so the two decide to attack the bandits' base first. After reminiscing on how Hinata helped him with schoolwork as children, Jinguuji accidentally sees Hinata's breasts and freaks out, beating up the bandits like a berserker. The villagers show up to help and Jinguuji attacks them as well. Hinata asks what is wrong with him and he reluctantly admits that he finds her beautiful, making her freak out and slap him. The villagers allow the two to keep the bandits' treasure and give Hinata a less revealing dress. Hinata is secretly pleased that Jinguuji is attracted to her, then finds a torch was knocked over, starting a forest fire. The next day, an elf chieftess, Telolilo Lilili Lu, wakes up and is shocked to find the forest around her village burned down.
3	"A Guy Who Reincarnated as a Fantasy Knockout and an Angry Elf"; Transliteration: "Fabiniku Ojisan to Ikari no Erufu" (Japanese: ファ美肉おじさんと怒りのエルフ)	Ken'ichi Nishida	Toshimitsu Takeuchi	Ken'ichi Nishida	January 26, 2022
Jinguuji attempts to sell the pelt of the creature he killed and learns it was a guardian of the forest. The villagers do not know about the Demon Lord and suggest going to a nearby town. He enters the door to Hinata's house and accidentally walks in on her after a bath. After helping her get dressed, they go back to the village to find Telolilo and her entourage demanding restitution for the forest fire and the death of their guardian. Hinata apologizes, but Jinguuji rudely refuses because they are female and worship the Goddess of Love. Telolilo is threatened by Hinata's beauty and strips, proclaiming herself the most beautiful woman. When the villagers say Hinata is more beautiful, she angrily attacks them with magical explosive arrows. Jinguuji hurls a stone that severs Telolilo's ponytail, distracting her long enough to escape. She swears revenge and goes after them. The two make camp and Jinguuji cooks the guardian's meat. They share beer, but due to her smaller body, Hinata quickly becomes drunk, strips, and runs into the wilderness. She is nearly eaten by a man-eating plant, but Jinguuji saves her. Telolilo finds their camp and samples the food, only to get attacked by another man-eating plant.
4	"A Guy Who Reincarnated as a Fantasy Knockout and a Dark Swordsman"; Transliteration: "Fabiniku Ojisan to Kuro no Kenshi" (Japanese: ファ美肉おじさんと黒の剣士)	Mayu Numayama	Masanao Akahoshi	Tomoko Akiyama	February 2, 2022 (Note: This episode aired at 12:10 a.m. JST, 10 minutes after the original air time on TV Tokyo.)
The two find a town and Jinguuji forces Hinata to wear a paper bag over her head so she doesn't charm anyone. At a weapon shop, Hinata buys magic hair decorations that divert attention away from the wearer. They get attacked by some of the escaped bandits seeking revenge, but a swordsman steps in and defeats them. He introduces himself as Schwartz von Liechtenstein Lohengramm, someone from Earth who was summoned to be a hero. He recognizes Jinguuji as a fellow Earthling due to his clothes, but thinks Hinata is a native. Unaffected by the hair decorations, a smitten Schwartz challenges Jinguuji to a duel for her hand and draws his sword Gram, slicing a building in half. Before the fight can escalate, the policewoman Lucius arrests Schwartz for property damage and orders the other two to come as witnesses. At the police station, Schwartz protests that he is a hero and shows a tattoo the Goddess of Night put on his hand when she summoned him, but Lucius thinks he is lying and that the tattoo is fake. Hinata asks Jinguuji to examine her and he finds a similar tattoo on the back of her neck. The lord Mercus arrives and says Schwartz will be given a chance to prove himself because a living suit of armor is attacking people.
5	"A Guy Who Reincarnated as a Fantasy Knockout and Armor that Moves"; Transliteration: "Fabiniku Ojisan to Ugoku Yoroi" (Japanese: ファ美肉おじさんと動く鎧)	Rokusuke Okimitsu	Toshimitsu Takeuchi	Norio Nitta	February 9, 2022
Lucius orders Jinguuji and Hinata to help her and Schwartz find the armor, which has been stripping people naked and stealing their belongings. The armor attacks them; it can speak and introduces itself as Vizzd, an officer of the Demon Lord. Schwartz fights it, but Jinguuji orders him not to draw his destructive sword. Vizzd strips him and devours his clothes and Gram. Lucius fights it and is also stripped. Hinata covers her with her jacket, but the thought of Hinata being stripped infuriates Jinguuji and he shatters the armor, revealing the real Vizzd is a little girl inside. They arrest and interrogate her while Lucius and Mercus say they thought the Demon Lord was just a story. She says she was trapped in the little girl form and was collecting magical energy to recover. She doesn't believe Schwartz is the hero. That night, the demoness Kalm breaks Vizzd out of prison and suspects Jinguuji is the hero. The next day, Hinata reveals to Schwartz that she used to be male to stop him from hitting on her, devastating him. She also teaches him to see his stats, which he had been unaware of. Schwartz turns out to be an alias and he embarrassedly covers up his real name. He experiments with his skills and accidentally makes a portal open in the sky.
6	"A Guy Who Reincarnated as a Fantasy Knockout and a Free Spirit"; Transliteration: "Fabiniku Ojisan to Jiyūjin" (Japanese: ファ美肉おじさんと自由人)	Akira Ishii	Masanao Akahoshi	Akiko Nagashima	February 16, 2022
The giant Goddess of Night emerges from the portal, causing Lucius to apologize for doubting Schwartz. The Goddess of Night shrinks down and identifies Hinata as the hero summoned by the Goddess of Love with Jinguuji as her weapon. She asks Schwartz what happened to the weapon she gave him, Gram, and he nervously conceals the fact that Vizzd destroyed it. Mercus asks Hinata to marry him, wanting the fame of being with a hero, but is beaten up by Lucius while the Goddess of Night leaves. Mercus turns his town into a holy site and asks the heroes to stay, but only Schwartz takes up the offer. On the road, Hinata and Jinguuji spot Telolilo bound and gagged in a passing carriage, but ignore it. They come to a town with excessive squid-based merchandise and purchase food, but Hinata goes missing. Jinguuji finds the carriage from earlier, but it is empty. He interrogates the driver and learns that this town uses beautiful women as human sacrifices. In a building, Telolilo attempts to seduce her captor to escape, but another man carries in a bound Hinata and says she is more beautiful and will be the sacrifice instead.
7	"A Guy Who Reincarnated as a Fantasy Knockout and a Squid Fire"; Transliteration: "Fabiniku Ojisan to Ika Faiyā" (Japanese: ファ美肉おじさんとイカファイヤー)	Hideaki Ōba	Masanao Akahoshi	Hideaki Ōba; Akiko Nagashima	February 23, 2022
Telolilo angrily challenges Hinata to see who is more beautiful. The driver explains that a talking giant squid became the town's god and provided the town with food in exchange for human sacrifices. The driver decides to help Jinguuji and together, they find Telolilo, who is dejected that their captors chose Hinata as the most beautiful. Seeking revenge, she offers to help. Jinguuji ties her up and throws her into the water as bait for the giant squid. As night falls, the squid devours her and Jinguuji attempts to reel it in, but finds he is losing his strength. Meanwhile, Hinata attempts to escape and knocks her hair decorations off, causing her captors and all the men to fall in love, but also causing the jealous women to form an angry mob against her. When Jinguuji spots her in danger, he regains his strength and hurls the squid, impaling it on a statue. However, it is still alive and attempts to devour Hinata. Telolilo emerges from its stomach and finishes it off, convincing the people that it is not a god. As they celebrate, Vizzd and Kalm observe them and deduce that Jinguuji loses his strength when he is away from Hinata.
8	"A Guy Who Reincarnated as a Fantasy Knockout and a Choice"; Transliteration: "Fabiniku Ojisan to Sentaku" (Japanese: ファ美肉おじさんと選択)	Norio Nitta	Toshimitsu Takeuchi	Tomoko Akiyama	March 2, 2022
The driver, Shen, asks to come with the two until they reach Ishruna, the royal capital. They catch a rabbit and Jinguuji forces Hinata to kill it herself, traumatizing her. After eating it, Hinata goes to the toilet in her house. Jinguuji demands the truth from Shen because his stats show he is a skilled assassin. Jinguuji is weakened as Shen reveals he drugged his food before attacking him. When Hinata comes back, Jinguuji tells her to run, but Shen says he does not care about her and is only interested in Jinguuji, making them suspect he is gay. Shen pins Jinguuji, only to give him a back massage, which was all he wanted. With Jinguuji feeling much better, they reach Ishruna and the two go to the temple of the Goddess of Love to find info on the Demon Lord. A priestess will not let them in unless they put on skimpy swimsuits. After Hinata puts hers on, she is embarrassed when the others point out they can wear them under their clothes. Inside the temple is a pool party orgy. The people spot Hinata's tattoo and are enraged, accusing them of blasphemy. They attack and Jinguuji fends them off. Royal troops storm the temple and inform them that the two were indeed summoned by the Goddess of Love.
9	"A Guy Who Reincarnated as a Fantasy Knockout and a Beautiful Girl"; Transliteration: "Fabiniku Ojisan to Bishōjo" (Japanese: ファ美肉おじさんと美少女)	Ken'ichi Nishida	Masanao Akahoshi	Ken'ichi Nishida	March 9, 2022
The troops' leader, Muria, takes the two to the king and reveals Shen works for her. The king explains a prophecy saying the hero summoned by the Goddess of Love is destined to defeat the Demon Lord and the kingdom is obligated to help them. At a feast, the two become attracted to each other due to their fancy clothes, but get into an argument and separate. Hinata becomes attracted to a girl and stops her from committing suicide. They talk and Hinata realizes she wants Jinguuji to praise her. Later, as Shen urges the two to make up, the girl appears and introduces herself as Princess Ugraine. She begs Hinata to take her with them on their journey, but Jinguuji and the king refuse, making her storm off. Hinata follows her and she explains that ever since her mother died giving birth to her, her father the king has been controlling her life and will not let her leave the palace. Hinata helps her sneak out, but she quickly gathers followers and starts a rebellion. Muria attempts to capture Ugraine, but is captured instead. While Jinguuji and Shen try to figure out how to get Hinata out of the rebellion, the king orders someone's help.
10	"A Guy Who Reincarnated as a Fantasy Knockout and a Rebel Army"; Transliteration: "Fabiniku Ojisan to Hanran" (Japanese: ファ美肉おじさんと反乱)	Mayu Numayama	Masanao Akahoshi	Akiko Nagashima	March 16, 2022
Ugraine's maid joins the rebellion and confiscates Hinata's hair decorations. They force her to help Ugraine charm men into joining them. Hinata attempts to free Muria and escape, but fails, and she laments that she cannot do anything without Jinguuji. She reminisces on a time Jinguuji rescued her original male self from bullies. The maid gives her a massage, but also pours dark energy into her tattoo, filling her with negative thoughts and jealousy of Jinguuji. The people the king called for, Schwartz and Lucius, arrive. Lucius repeatedly beats up Schwartz for his idiocy, but he impresses her by saying he wants to protect the civilians. The revolutionary army attacks Ishruna, but Schwartz destroys their weapons and clothes with one swing of Gram, which he recovered from Vizzd's armor, making them retreat. Jinguuji is depressed without Hinata, but is angered when Schwartz suggests he is jealous of Ugraine for stealing Hinata from him. Suddenly, the area experiences tremors.
11	"A Guy Who Reincarnated as a Fantasy Knockout and a Weapon for the Final Battle"; Transliteration: "Fabiniku Ojisan to Kessen Heiki" (Japanese: ファ美肉おじさんと決戦兵器)	Ken'ichi Nishida	Toshimitsu Takeuchi	Norio Nitta	March 23, 2022
The maid is really Kalm in disguise, working with Vizzd and infecting Ugraine with dark energy to destroy Ishruna. The people whom Schwartz defeated snapped out of Hinata's charm and quit, so Kalm and Vizzd take Hinata and Ugraine to the royal armory, which can only be unlocked by two people of royal blood; Hinata counts because she was chosen by the Goddess of Love. They retrieve a giant mecha called Meepon, then after knocking Ugraine out and using Hinata as a living battery, Vizzd pilots it to attack Ishruna. While Lucius and Shen evacuate the civilians, Schwartz is forced to fight Meepon alone because Jinguuji was separated from Hinata for too long and lost his strength. When they realize Hinata is inside it, Jinguuji and Schwartz ride up to Meepon, but Jinguuji does not regain his strength. Suddenly, Hinata awakens and usurps control of Meepon from Vizzd. Still under the influence of the dark energy, she gloats that she is finally powerful, then declares her hatred and envy of Jinguuji and attempts to crush him.
12	"A Guy Who Reincarnated as a Fantasy Knockout and" Transliteration: "Fantajī Bishōjo Juniku Ojisan to" (Japanese: 異世界(ファンタジー)美少女受肉おじさんと)	Sayaka Yamai	Toshimitsu Takeuchi	Sayaka Yamai; Akiko Nagashima	March 30, 2022
Schwartz defends Jinguuji from Meepon's attacks and urges him to tell Hinata how he really feels, but he believes men expressing feelings is weakness. Schwartz punches him and says it is not weakness, so Jinguuji admits he is jealous of and admires Hinata for having the friendliness and social skills that he lacks. Touched, Hinata breaks free from Kalm's influence, but Meepon becomes autonomous and attempts to kill everyone. Regaining his strength, Jinguuji and Schwartz destroy the robot and free Hinata. Jinguuji lists every positive thing about Hinata until she is embarrassed. Meepon self destructs and everyone escapes the blast radius, including Vizzd and Kalm who return to the Demon Lord. The rebellion is stopped, the hair decorations are recovered, and the king apologizes for alienating Ugraine. Muria attempts to quit for her failure and Ugraine stops her. They decide they must stop the Demon Lord and Schwartz reveals he knew where he lives. As they rest, Hinata realizes she is in love with Jinguuji and is embarrassed. The next day, Schwartz decides to go with Lucius to her hometown but promises to catch up and assist them. The two begin their journey to the Demon Lord's castle.

== Reception ==
By February 2026, the manga had over 1.5 million copies in circulation.

The series ranked 19th in the 2020 Next Manga Award in the web manga category.
