= Too Many Losing Heroines! =

Japanese light novel series

- First light novel volume cover, featuring Anna Yanami

負けヒロインが多すぎる！ (Make Hiroin ga Ōsugiru!)
- Genre: Romantic comedy
- Light novel
- Written by: Takibi Amamori
- Illustrated by: Imigimuru
- Published by: Shogakukan
- English publisher: NA: Seven Seas Entertainment
- Imprint: Gagaga Bunko
- Original run: July 21, 2021 – present
- Volumes: 9 + 2 short story collections
- Manga
- Written by: Takibi Amamori
- Illustrated by: Itachi
- Published by: Shogakukan
- English publisher: NA: Seven Seas Entertainment
- Magazine: Ura Sunday; MangaOne
- Original run: April 29, 2022 – present
- Volumes: 6
- Anime television series

Makeine: Too Many Losing Heroines!
- Directed by: Shōtarō Kitamura
- Written by: Masahiro Yokotani
- Music by: Kana Utatane
- Studio: A-1 Pictures (Note: The Production Committee of the series also consists of Aniplex, Contents Seed, Good Smile Film, JR Tokai Agency, Nippon BS Broadcasting, Tokyo MX and Yomiuri Telecasting Corporation.)
- Licensed by: Crunchyroll; SEA: Plus Media Networks Asia
- Original network: Tokyo MX, GTV, GYT, BS11, Chukyo TV, ytv
- English network: SEA: Aniplus
- Original run: July 14, 2024 – present
- Episodes: 12
- icon

Too Many Losing Heroines! (Japanese: 負けヒロインが多すぎる！, Hepburn: Make Hiroin ga Ōsugiru!), also known as Makeine (マケイン), is a Japanese light novel series written by Takibi Amamori and illustrated by Imigimuru. The story takes place in Toyohashi, Aichi, where Amamori comes from. It follows a boy in high school interacting with several girls who got heartbroken after being rejected by their respective love interests. It began publication under Shogakukan's Gagaga Bunko imprint in July 2021. A manga adaptation illustrated by Itachi began serialization on Shogakukan's Ura Sunday website and MangaOne app in April 2022.

An anime television series adaptation produced by A-1 Pictures aired from July to September 2024. A second season has been announced. Both the novel and the anime series were met with very positive reviews.

== Plot ==
Self-proclaimed "background character" Kazuhiko Nukumizu accidentally witnesses Anna Yanami, a beautiful and popular girl in his class, being rejected by her childhood friend. He labels her a "losing heroine", and soon finds himself getting involved with Anna and other similar girls.

== Characters ==
=== Main characters ===
Kazuhiko Nukumizu (温水 和彦, Nukumizu Kazuhiko)
Voiced by: Shotaro Uzawa (audiobook), Shūichirō Umeda (anime) (Japanese); Kevin D. Thelwell (English)
The protagonist of the series. He is a reserved first-year high-school student with an analytical personality and is also an otaku fond of reading light novels. He usually doesn't like socializing and tends to be on his own, but can still offer good advice to others around him. He witnesses the various heroines of the story being rejected by their crushes and decides to emotionally support them and help them move on – though at times, their antics tend to annoy him beyond belief. As the story progresses, Nukumizu begins to open up and socialize more thanks to his time with the girls, and starts developing genuine friendships with people for the first time in his life. He has a taste for tap water and its quality, a hobby he shares with Chika. It's implied that he develops a crush on Anna later on, but this is not confirmed yet.
Anna Yanami (八奈見 杏菜, Yanami Anna)
Voiced by: Rina Honnizumi (audiobook), Hikaru Tono (anime) (Japanese); Trisha Mellon (English)
One of the loser heroines. She is the popular girl in Kazuhiko's class with vibrant blue hair, a bright and charming personality, and is close friends with Lemon. Though she's known for her beauty and playful nature, and is often the target of many other boys' affections, she's had a long-lasting crush on her childhood friend Sōsuke Hakamada, who never reciprocated her feelings at all and instead started dating her rival Karen Himemiya, much to her frustration and inner jealousy. She is a glutton and is often seen eating, though always manages to maintain a healthy and slim figure. Though her antics tend to annoy Nukumizu, she genuinely does care for him, and with his help, she is eventually able to move on from her heartbreak and enjoy life.
Amamori did not originally plan Anna to be a glutton, but wrote her that way as he continued writing the story. He originally planned to name her Iroha, although his editor suggested he change it as it was already the name of a major character in My Youth Romantic Comedy Is Wrong, as I Expected.
Lemon Yakishio (焼塩 檸檬, Yakishio Remon)
Voiced by: Maki Yamaichi (audiobook), Shion Wakayama (anime) (Japanese); Bev Mageto (English)
One of the loser heroines and another classmate of Kazuhiko. She has a tan complexion and is the ace of the track and field club, and like Yanami, is also popular. She's also in love with her childhood friend Mitsuki Ayano, who already has a girlfriend named Chihaya Asagumo. She initially feels dismay that Mitsuki does not see her in the same way he sees Chihaya, but later on, it is revealed that Mitsuki also had romantic feelings for her when they were younger. This helps Lemon come to terms with her heartbreak and move on with her life, while still remaining good friends with Mitsuki and Chihaya.
Chika Komari (小鞠 知花, Komari Chika)
Voiced by: Mei Shibata (audiobook), Momoka Terasawa (anime) (Japanese); Morgan Lea (English)
One of the loser heroines and another classmate of Kazuhiko. A member of the literature club, she is shy and has a hard time talking to others. She's had a long-lasting crush on Shintarō Tamaki, who has remained completely oblivious due to her not being able to confess sooner while harboring feelings for Koto. Despite Shintarō not reciprocating her feelings, she is still in good terms with him and Koto. One notable trait of hers is that she tends to stutter when speaking with other strangers. It's implied later on that Chika might have developed feelings for Nukumizu after he helps her gain more confidence, but she always denies this out of embarrassment and continues to mock him for it.

=== Tsuwabuki High School ===
==== Students ====
Koto Tsukinoki (月之木 古都, Tsukinoki Koto)
Voiced by: Keaki Watanabe (audiobook), Atsumi Tanezaki (anime) (Japanese); Madeleine Norton (English)
The vice president of the literature club who is Shintarō's childhood friend. Shintarō holds feelings for her, and she recently became his girlfriend.
Shintarō Tamaki (玉木 慎太郎, Tamaki Shintarō)
Voiced by: Shuma Konoe (audiobook), Yūsuke Kobayashi (anime) (Japanese); Ethan Gallardo (English)
The president of the literature club whom Chika is in love with. However, he has no romantic feelings for Chika at all, and instead is in love with Koto.
Sōsuke Hakamada (袴田 草介, Hakamada Sōsuke)
Voiced by: Taira Yamauchi (audiobook), Ryōta Ōsaka (anime) (Japanese); Alejandro Saab (English)
Another classmate of Kazuhiko who is Anna's childhood friend and long-term crush.
Karen Himemiya (姫宮 華恋, Himemiya Karen)
Voiced by: Azumi Waki (Japanese); Alexis Tipton (English)
Another classmate of Kazuhiko who is Sōsuke's girlfriend and Anna's rival. She is unaware of Anna being rejected by Sōsuke, and is often seen trying to get along with her. She is a kind and good-natured girl who always worries for others and would try to befriend people like Kazuhiko.
Mitsuki Ayano (綾野 光希, Ayano Mitsuki)
Voiced by: Chiaki Kobayashi (Japanese); Connor Allison (English)
Another classmate of Kazuhiko who is Lemon's childhood friend and crush. When he was younger, he used to have feelings for Lemon, but didn't quite understand what they were and never got a chance to confess, seeing himself as unworthy for her due to her popularity. He is currently dating Chihaya Asagumo, but still remains on good terms with Lemon.
Chihaya Asagumo (朝雲 千早, Asagumo Chihaya)
Voiced by: Reina Ueda (Japanese); Meg McClain (English)
Another classmate of Kazuhiko who is Mitsuki's girlfriend. She and Lemon become good friends later on, though at times, she can't help but worry if Mitsuki is cheating on her.

==== Student Council ====
Hibari Hōkobaru (放虎原 ひばり, Hōkobaru Hibari)
Voiced by: Hiroki Nanami (Japanese); Hollis Beck (English)
The incumbent President of the student council and Hiroto's cousin. Kazuhiko observes that she has a clumsy, airheaded personality beneath her dignified and beautiful appearance.
Tiara Basori (馬剃 天愛星, Basori Tiara)
Voiced by: Sumire Morohoshi (Japanese); Rebecca Chiara Marano (English)
The vice president of the student council. She is conscious about her poor grades in school. Though she initially feels uneasy around Kazuhiko, she eventually develops feelings for him after they spend some time together. She also idolizes Hibari, despite her clumsy personality.
Yumeko Shikiya (志喜屋 夢子, Shikiya Yumeko)
Voiced by: Chihiro Shirata (audiobook), Chika Anzai (anime) (Japanese); Brianna Roberts (English)
The Secretary of the student council. She is described as a "zombie girl", due to her dress sense and her perceived personality. It is implied she has a condition that contributes to her low-energy demeanor, as she is once compared to a cold-blooded creature. She is one of the top students of her year, and is very capable in handling student council work, in spite of her physical condition, and is actually quite attractive, being the target of many boys' affections.
Hiroto Sakurai (桜井 ひろと, Sakurai Hiroto)
The treasurer of the student council and Hibari's cousin.

==== Staff ====
Konami Amanatsu (甘夏 古奈美, Amanatsu Konami)
Voiced by: Yurie Igoma (audiobook), Sumire Uesaka (anime) (Japanese); Corinne Sudberg (English)
The homeroom teacher of Kazuhiko's class.
Sayo Konuki (小抜 小夜, Konuki Sayo)
Voiced by: Kiri Kamasawa (audiobook), Chiwa Saitō (anime) (Japanese); Maganda Marie (English)
The school nurse.

=== Other characters ===
Kaju Nukumizu (温水 佳樹, Nukumizu Kaju)
Voiced by: Chihiro Shirata (audiobook), Minami Tanaka (anime) (Japanese); Monica Flatley (English)
A second-year middle school student who is Kazuhiko's little sister and is concerned about her older brother's lack of friends. She calls Kazuhiko "Onii-sama" and speaks in the third-person. She is a member of her school's student council. She becomes good friends with several of the girls later on.
Asami Gondō (権藤 アサミ, Gondō Asami)
Voiced by: Akira Sekine (Japanese); Natalie Van Sistine (English)
A second-year middle school student who is Kaju's best and closest friend. She is noted to be unusually tall for a middle school student.

== Media ==
=== Light novel ===
Written by Takibi Amamori and illustrated by Imigimuru, Too Many Losing Heroines! began publication under Shogakukan's Gagaga Bunko imprint on July 21, 2021. Nine volumes and two short stories volumes have been released as of July 17, 2026.

In July 2023, the official Twitter account of the light novel announced that the series had been licensed in English without revealing a publisher. In February 2024, Seven Seas Entertainment announced that they had licensed the series.

An audiobook version of the series began on September 20, 2023, featuring the voices of Shotaro Uzawa, Rina Honnizumi, Maki Yamaichi, Mei Shibata, Chihiro Shirata, Keaki Watanabe, Shuma Konoe, Yurie Igoma, Kiri Kamasawa, and Taira Yamauchi, all of whom are from 81 Produce. It has been released up to the second volume of the series.

No.	Original release date	Original ISBN	English release date	English ISBN
1	July 21, 2021	978-4-09-453017-9	July 4, 2024 (digital); August 13, 2024 (print)	979-8-89160-307-3
Foreword; Loss 1: The Pro Childhood Friend Strikes Out; Intermission: Even Though She Was Hungry—She Was a Good Girl, an Angel; Loss 2: Yakishio Lemon versus the Narrative; Loss 3: Komari Chika Wins the Battle, Loses the War; Intermission: She's Right Behind Me, Isn't She?; Loss 4: When You Gaze upon the Losing Heroines, the Losing Heroines Gaze Back
2	November 18, 2021	978-4-09-453041-4	October 17, 2024 (digital); November 12, 2024 (print)	979-8-89160-308-0
Foreword; Loss 1: Yanami Anna; Intermission: It's Never What You Think It'll Be; Loss 2: Asagumo Chihaya and the Goose Chase; Loss 3: Let He Who Is Without Loss Cast the First Stone; Intermission: Central Japan Railway—Hon-Nagashino Station; Loss 4: Yakishio Lemon Tells All; Epilogue: After Happily Ever After; Bonus Story: When Your Sister Might Have Problems
3	April 19, 2022	978-4-09-453064-3	January 30, 2025 (digital); February 18, 2025 (print)	979-8-89160-582-4
Foreword; Loss 1: Shikiya Yumeko to the Rescue; Intermission: Rendezvous Avenue; Loss 2: Himemiya Karen, the Fashionably Late; Intermission: Think of the Neighbors; Loss 3: Early Goodbyes; Intermission: Brother-Sister; Loss 4: Let's Talk Accountability; Epilogue: A Few Floors Up; Bonus Story: I'm Beggin' Ya, Teacher!
4	October 18, 2022	978-4-09-453094-0	April 24, 2025 (digital); May 27, 2025 (print)	979-8-89160-583-1
Foreword; Loss 1: I'll Have You Know; Intermission: Thoughts and Prayers; Loss 2: A Small Kindness; Intermission: His and Her Lack of Circumstances; Loss 3: Defining the Heart; Intermission: Christmas Eve with Tiara-san; Loss 4: Prelude to Sixteen; Epilogue: Secrets; Bonus Story: All-Ages, No Problems
5	March 17, 2023	978-4-09-453118-3	August 7, 2025 (digital); September 2, 2025 (print)	979-8-89373-561-1
Foreword; Loss 1: A Battle of Dimwits; Intermission: A Student Council's IdioSYDcracies; Loss 2: Two Steps Forward, Three Steps Back; Intermission: Ruminations with the B-Team; Loss 3: Dividing and Conquering, but It's Long Division; Intermission: Friends at Dusk; Loss 4: The Courage to Let Go; Epilogue: Past and Future; Bonus Story: No Rest for the Wicked
6	December 18, 2023	978-4-09-453164-0	November 27, 2025 (digital); December 23, 2025 (print)	979-8-89373-562-8
Foreword; Loss 1: Briny Confessions; Intermission: Little Sister Is Watching You; Loss 2: What Doesn't Kill You Makes You Sopping; Intermission: Spring in Bloom, Spring in Bloom; Loss 3: Goodbye Season; Intermission: Love Takes Time; Loss 4: A Girl Called Yakishio Lemon; Epilogue: Tsuwabuki Second-Years; Bonus Story: Secret × Secret
7	July 18, 2024	978-4-09-453197-8	March 19, 2026 (digital); April 21, 2026 (print)	979-8-89373-791-2
Foreword; Loss 1: Nukumizu Kazuhiko of Class 2-C; Intermission: Stranger Danger; Loss 2: It's Complicated; Intermission: Let There Be Midnight Snacks; Loss 3: It Takes a Thief; Intermission: Sweet Tea; Loss 4: Shiratama Riko Strikes Back; Epilogue: Shiratama Riko of Class 1-F; Bonus Story: Birds of a Feather Balk Together
SSS	July 18, 2024	978-4-09-453201-2	December 22, 2026 (print)	979-8-89863-157-4
8	May 19, 2025	978-4-09-453242-5	July 23, 2026 (digital); August 18, 2026 (print)	979-8-89765-551-9
Foreword; Loss 1: The Purest of Intentions; Intermission: Appeal to Emotion; Loss 2: Burdened by the Weight; Intermission: I'll Have You Know I'm Kind of a Big Deal; Loss 3: Crimson Rhapsody; Intermission: Everybody, Do Your Share; Loss 4: Enemy of Women Who?; Epilogue: Onward to Adulthood
8.5	January 26, 2026	978-4-09-453276-0	March 23, 2027 (print)	—
9	July 17, 2026	978-4-09-453300-2	—	—

=== Manga ===
A manga adaptation illustrated by Itachi began serialization on Shogakukan's Ura Sunday website and MangaOne app on April 29, 2022. The manga's chapters have been collected in six tankōbon volumes as of August 10, 2026.

In February 2024, Seven Seas Entertainment announced that they also licensed the manga adaptation.

No.	Original release date	Original ISBN	English release date	English ISBN
1	October 12, 2022	978-4-09-851336-9	August 20, 2024	979-8-89160-309-7
1. "Hello There, Yanami Anna"; 2. "Am I, by Chance, the Background Character Who Randomly Shows up to Comfort the Losing Heroine in the Final Chapter?"; 3. "A Refreshing Citrus-Scented Youth"; 4. "Is This an Ambush? Nope, It's Just Another Losing Heroine!"; 5. "The Crushing Defeat, as Foretold"
2	August 18, 2023	978-4-09-852674-1	December 10, 2024	979-8-89160-310-3
6. "Kaju Needs to Know: How Do I Capture Oniisama's Heart?"; 7. "The Crushing Defeat, as Foretold: The Sequel"; 8. "That's How It Is, Nukumizu-kun"; 9. "Seawater with a Hint of Lemon Dressing"; 10. "Fireworks, Sparks, and Raging Hormones"; 11. "A Losing Battle: Komari Chika Joins the Losers' Bracket"
3	July 18, 2024	978-4-09-853388-6	May 6, 2025 (digital); June 17, 2025 (print)	979-8-89373-293-1
12. "When You Gaze Upon the Losing Heroines, the Losing Heroines Gaze Back"; 13. "Out in the Woods"; 14. "The Bluebird of Happiness"; 15. "Yanami Anna Wants to Cast Bait"
4	January 10, 2025	978-4-09-853801-0	November 11, 2025	979-8-89561-732-8
16. "Exceedingly Obvious"; 17. "Scramble Date"; 18. "Asagumo Chihaya Is Confused"; 19. "Let Only He Who Has Never Been Rejected Cast the First Stone"; Bonus: "Ma'am. Please Keep Your Hands Off My Waifus!"
5	September 11, 2025	978-4-09-854254-3	June 16, 2026	979-8-89765-375-1
20. "Stack One for the Losing Heroine, Stack Two for the Losing Heroine, Stack Three for Whom?"; 21. "After Happily Ever After"; 22. "From Assignment Ideas to Deep-Seated Insecurities, This Consultant Is Here to Help!"
6	August 10, 2026	978-4-09-854720-3	—	—

=== Anime ===
An anime television series adaptation was announced in December 2023. It is produced by Aniplex, animated by A-1 Pictures, and directed by Shōtarō Kitamura, with scripts written by Masahiro Yokotani, characters designed by Tetsuya Kawakami, and music composed by Kana Utatane. The series aired from July 14 to September 29, 2024, on Tokyo MX and other networks. (Note: Tokyo MX lists the series premiere on July 13, 2024, at 24:30, which is effectively July 14 at 12:30 a.m. JST.) The opening theme song is "Tsuyogaru Girl" (つよがるガール; lit. 'Tough-Acting Girl'), performed by BotchiBoromaru feat. Mossa of Necry Talkie, while the multiple ending theme songs are performed by the losing heroines in the following order: the first is a cover of Hitomi's "Love 2000" performed by Hikaru Tono as her character Anna Yanami, the second is a cover of Kylee's "Crazy For You" performed by Shion Wakayama as her character Lemon Yakishio, and the third is a cover of Yui's "Feel My Soul" performed by Momoka Terasawa as her character Chika Komari.

The closing sequence for the first episode, was made using cel animation superimposed on live-action backgrounds shot with an 8mm film camera, marking the first time a new cel animation has been broadcast on television in 10 years and 9 months.

Crunchyroll streamed the series worldwide outside of Asia, but including Indian subcontinent. An English dub produced in Coppell under the direction of Helena Walstrom that premiered on July 27, 2024. Plus Media Networks Asia licensed the series in Southeast Asia and airs it on Aniplus Asia.

According to the editor-in-charge of the light novel series, Iwaasa, the discussion about the anime adaptation started before the publication of the first volume of the series. The 12th and final episode of the first season was an original episode written by series creator Takibi Amamori.

A second season was announced during an event for the anime series on April 6, 2025.

==== Episodes ====
No.	Title	Directed by	Storyboarded by	Original release date
1	"Professional Childhood Friend Yanami Anna's Style of Losing"; Transliteration: "Puro Osananajimi Yanami Anna no Make-ppuri" (Japanese: プロ幼馴染八奈見杏菜の負けっぷり)	Shōtarō Kitamura	Shōtarō Kitamura	July 14, 2024
Kazuhiko Nukumizu is a high school student who has no experience being in a romantic relationship, instead spending his time reading light novels. While at a restaurant, he witnesses a quarrel between his classmates Anna Yanami and Sōsuke Hakamada on the latter's relationship with Karen Himemiya. Anna confesses her feelings to Sōsuke before he runs off to see Karen, leaving her dejected. Kazuhiko attempts to feign ignorance until he is noticed by Anna. She sits beside him and begins venting about losing Sōsuke to Karen, then forces him to pay her bill when she sees she can't afford it. At school, Kazuhiko and Anna hang out during lunch at the school's emergency stairwell, where Anna shares her displeasure and jealousy in joining Sōsuke and Karen on their trips as she gradually pays back Kazuhiko the restaurant bill by making him bentos amounting to the bills. Kazuhiko joins the school's literature club and meets fellow first-year Chika Komari, vice president Koto Tsukinoki, and Lemon Yakishio, who is attempting to hang out with her childhood friend Mitsuki Ayano, to no avail. One day later, Kazuhiko meets with Anna, who has tearfully come to realize Sōsuke chose Karen over her. Anna assures him he would understand when he gets into a relationship; Kazuhiko replies that he has never been in one, leaving Anna charmed.
2	"The Promised Failure for You"; Transliteration: "Yakusoku Sareta Haiboku o Kimi ni" (Japanese: 約束された敗北を君に)	Yuki Watanabe	Shōtarō Kitamura	July 21, 2024
While cleaning sports equipment at the school's storage room, Kazuhiko is found by Lemon as she asks for advice on how she can hang out with Mitsuki. He suggests that she can join Mitsuki when he borrows books from the literature club. Thanking him, Lemon proceeds to leave until realizing the shed is locked from the outside. The two nearly suffer heatstroke, with Lemon becoming delirious and behaving embarrasingly, but they are saved by their homeroom teacher. They are later visited by Anna, as the school doctor Sayo Konuki takes note of their banter. Kazuhiko heads to the literature club room the following day to help Lemon with her predicament, with Anna coming along as assistance. When Koto assumes Lemon and Mitsuki are dating, Mitsuki clears up the confusion by elaborating he is in a relationship with fellow classmate Chihaya Asagumo, breaking Lemon's heart and leading Kazuhiko and Anna to cheer her up by letting her join the club and treating her for dinner. Later that evening, as Sayo tries to make sense of the relationship dynamics surrounding Kazuhiko, she sees Lemon practicing passionately and saying she is getting somewhere.
3	"Losing the Battle Before it is Ever Fought"; Transliteration: "Tatakau Mae Kara Maketeiru" (Japanese: 戦う前から負けている)	Komao Yukihiro	Shin'ichirō Ushijima	July 28, 2024
Kazuhiko and Chika are instructed by the literature club president Shintarō Tamaki to head to the club room, where Koto announces the club will be holding a training camp in the weekend to write novels. Kazuhiko later tells Anna their plans and she begs to join the club to avoid a gathering between her and Sōsuke's families and learning there is a beach near the training camp. The club arrives at the beach and proceeds to enjoy their time as Chika passes any opportunity to join them, despite Kazuhiko's offer to use it to spend time with Shintarō. While Kazuhiko and Lemon head out to buy food for the club, she expresses her disappointment of Mitsuki not seeing her in the same way as Chihaya, so Kazuhiko reassures her to not mope and have fun. Shintarō reads Chika's novel and is impressed with her writing, flustering Chika. As night arrives, Chika lights up a sparkler and is narrowly saved by Shintarō after directing it to her face and almost burning herself; feeling grateful that Shintarō cares for her well-being, Chika confesses her feelings to him and asks him out on a date, leaving him and the others completely stunned.
4	"When You Stare into a Losing Heroine, the Losing Heroine Stares Back into You"; Transliteration: "Make Hiroin o Nozoku Toki, Make Hiroin mo Mata Anata o Nozoiteiru Noda" (Japanese: 負けヒロインを覗く時、負けヒロインもまたあなたを覗いているのだ)	Tsuyoshi Tobita	Shōtarō Kitamura	August 4, 2024
Unable to respond, Shintarō asks Chika for time to process her confession, leading Chika to run off and Koto to slap him when he does not reciprocate Koto's remark of them being childhood friends. Kazuhiko sees Shintarō caught up with his dilemma and Shintarō seeks for advice on who to pursue; he has no feelings for Chika at all, but he confessed to Koto once before and got rejected. Anna approaches the boys and reveals Koto left ahead, prompting Kazuhiko to catch up to her and talk; Koto reveals she always reciprocated Shintarō's feelings, but misinterpreted his last confession. Kazuhiko sees Chika heartbroken after Shintarō declined her, but she still keeps her head high and remains on good terms with Shintarō and Koto. Later at school, Kazuhiko hears rumors being spread of him and Anna dating and how he is out of her league, making him wonder what their relationship is. Out of fear of the rumors affecting Anna, Kazuhiko completely forgives her debt and severs ties with her, which hurts her. Some days later, Sōsuke approaches Kazuhiko to congratulate him on dating Anna, as Kazuhiko clears up the confusion. Anna confronts them, declaring that neither boy will dictate her life, while also confirming she still has feelings for Sōsuke despite him dating Karen. At the start of summer vacation, Kazuhiko and Anna talk on being friends and confessions, gleefully laughing as they mend their friendship.
5	"Asagumo Chihaya Is Led Astray"; Transliteration: "Asagumo Chihaya wa Madowaseru" (Japanese: 朝雲千早は惑わせる)	Ayako Kōno	Masakazu Obara	August 11, 2024
Anna shares with Kazuhiko that she is coming to terms with Sōsuke and Karen dating and feeling grateful for them, leaving Kazuhiko skeptical. He meets with Lemon after hearing from Chika she has plans, who later leaves ahead of him. Anna invites Kazuhiko for tea and expresses her jealousy for Sōsuke and Karen once more, where they are shocked to see Lemon and Mitsuki hanging out together and Chihaya spying them. Chihaya talks to Kazuhiko and Anna about her suspicion that Mitsuki is cheating on her with Lemon and asks for their assistance to learn Mitsuki's true intentions, even if that means breaking up with him. Kazuhiko and Anna agree to help, and they spy on Lemon and Mitsuki the next day. Chihaya runs off after seeing Mitsuki having fun with Lemon, leading Kazuhiko to follow her in a bookstore and suggest taking Mitsuki out to learn more about him. They are interrupted when Mitsuki enters the bookstore, and while they try to hide, Mitsuki finds and confronts them.
6	"Let Any One of You Who Has Never Been Dumped Be the First to Throw a Stone at the Losing Heroine"; Transliteration: "Furareta Koto no Nai Mono Dake Ga, Make Hiroin ni Ishi o Nagenasai" (Japanese: 振られたことのない者だけが、負けヒロインに石を投げなさい)	Yuki Watanabe & Amagaeru	Yuki Watanabe & Motoki Nakanishi	August 18, 2024
Mitsuki and Kazuhiko confront each other on what they were doing with Lemon and Chihaya respectively. Both boys clarify they were asking the girls for relationship advice which prompts Mitsuki to have Kazuhiko invite someone from the literature club to a hangout with Lemon and Chihaya, leading Kazuhiko to reluctantly invite Anna as they visit a museum. Lemon talks to Kazuhiko on not wanting to interrupt Mitsuki and Chihaya enjoying their time together and asks him to not worry too much about how she feels. Mitsuki plans to split off from Kazuhiko and Anna to spend time with Lemon and Chihaya, but Lemon demands he should spend more time with Chihaya before accidentally revealing her feelings for him, shocking him and the rest of the group. Realizing the implication, Lemon runs off and cuts all contact with the group. Kazuhiko and Chihaya later meet, and the latter expresses her guilt on causing the current predicament, and worries for Lemon's well-being. Kazuhiko promises her he would handle the situation as he later receives a call from Koto, who arranges to visit Lemon with the rest of the club. As Kazuhiko shares his worry for Lemon, Koto reassures him they will keep her company in the meantime. The group travels to the home of Lemon's grandmother, but when the group prepares to spend the night, realize they forgot to tell Kazuhiko, who did not bring spare clothes with him. Lemon seems to be doing better, and is grateful the group was there for her.
7	"The Other Side of a Happy Ending"; Transliteration: "Happīendo no Mukōgawa" (Japanese: ハッピーエンドの向こう側)	Yudai Shimizu	Shōtarō Kitamura	August 25, 2024
At night, Kazuhiko and Anna discuss the situation involving Lemon, Mitsuki, and Chihaya. Anna expresses that they should be clearer with how they feel about one another. Kazuhiko later checks on Lemon, who worries how her friendship with Mitsuki will change after the incident and that her actions may ruin Mitsuki and Chihaya's relationship. As the literature club heads back home, Lemon promises Kazuhiko she will talk to Mitsuki and Chihaya properly. Afterwards, Lemon encounters Chihaya while going home and the two talk. A few days later, Lemon and Mitsuki reminisce on their childhood and how their friendship blossomed. As Lemon confesses how she wanted to enroll in the same school as him, Mitsuki returns the sentiment, revealing he also had a crush on Lemon but was unsure of what those feelings actually were at the time. Satisfied that she got to hear his feelings, Lemon asks him to treat Chihaya well and not give up on her after learning she shares the same aspirations as him. Lemon continues to be friends with Mitsuki and becomes more acquainted with Chihaya by the start of the new school term.
8	"If You Are In Trouble, Feel Free to Consult"; Transliteration: "Oko Marideshitara Kon Saru ni" (Japanese: おこまりでしたらコンサルに)	Akiyoshi Watari	Akiyoshi Watari	September 1, 2024
Kazuhiko meets with Shintarō and Koto to discuss submitting the literature club's plan for the upcoming school festival. Shintarō reveals he wants Kazuhiko and Chika to take over the club, using it as an opportunity for Chika to boost her self-confidence. As the couple plans to step down after the festival, they ask Kazuhiko to watch over Chika in their absence. Kazuhiko and Anna talk about Chika's passion on wanting the club to succeed during the festival, which Anna recognizes as an attempt to leave a positive impact on Shintarō's last year in high school. They later head out with Chika to brainstorm ideas for their festival booth, deciding to do an exhibit focusing on food and literature; the club also settles on letting Sayo be their advisor and turn in their application forms, as Kazuhiko and Chika work hard on their plan. Sometime later, Kazuhiko goes to the student council's room to hand in their club application form, meeting Tiara Basori and Hibari Hōkobaru, the latter remarking to Kazuhiko she will be keeping a closer eye on the literature club.
9	"Teacher Thought It Was a Stain in the Ceiling or Something... Please Continue"; Transliteration: "Sensei wa Tenjō no Shimi ka Nankada to Omotte, Tsuzuki o Dōzo" (Japanese: 先生は天井の染みかなんかだと思って、続きをどうぞ)	Komao Yukihiro	Kei Oikawa	September 8, 2024
After an encounter with Karen as the school prepares for the festival, Kazuhiko assists Chika in finalizing their club exhibit as they notice Shintarō and Koto together. Chika is aware of Kazuhiko's concern for her on their relationship and recounts how Shintarō and Koto were caring for her during her freshman year; Chika then worries she will be left alone after they graduate. Chika refuses Kazuhiko's attempt to help, stating she needs to be able to stand on her own, only for her to become sick from taking on the workload by herself some days later, worrying Kazuhiko, Shintarō, and Koto. When Kazuhiko offers to help again, Chika reassures she will finish the job; Kazuhiko concedes, but he promises her he and the club will handle setting up the exhibit while she rests at home. The next morning, as Kazuhiko prepares to set up, the rest of his friends alongside his sister Kaju arrive to help him and they accomplish it by the afternoon. Kazuhiko talks to Anna on how the exhibit is Chika's show of gratitude in her time as a member of the literature club, leading Anna to remark how Chika was ready to move on from Shintarō even after confessing her feelings to him. Kazuhiko later tells Anna to not say anything weird after he catches Sayo recording them during their moment together.
10	"I Suppose It's a Bit Too Early for Goodbye"; Transliteration: "Sayōnara ni wa Hayasugiru" (Japanese: さようならには早すぎる)	Tsuyoshi Tobita	Tatsuya Murakami	September 15, 2024
Chika checks out the literature club's exhibit after fully recovering and is left surprised with its display, thanking Kazuhiko and later learning how much his friends helped out. The school festival then begins in earnest, and Kazuhiko takes the time to visit some of his friends. He heads back to the exhibit and sees how popular it is. As the festival concludes, Shintarō proclaims the exhibit a success and is left proud at being able to finish his time in high school on a high note. Kazuhiko later talks to Koto on having concern with Chika taking up Shintarō's position, and Koto assures he can be able to assist her, pointing out how much Chika depends on him. Koto also shares how she was aware of Chika's feelings for Shintarō, but realized she underestimated her when she confessed during the training camp. Kazuhiko meets with Chika and hears her worries of losing her feelings for Shintarō after he thanked her for everything she has done for the club. Kazuhiko replies that her worries need more time to resolve themselves, making Chika come to terms and feel grateful that she got to like Shintarō, even if he never loved her back.
11	"Let's Have a Talk About Responsibility"; Transliteration: "Kekka Sekinin Nitsuite no Hanashi o Shiyō ka" (Japanese: 結果責任についての話をしようか)	Kīchirō Murase & Kazuki Kawagishi	Shōtarō Kitamura	September 22, 2024
Chika nervously practices her introduction for the club president meeting; despite her inability, she resolves to accomplishing it alone, despite Kazuhiko wanting to assist her. Anna takes them to a zoo as a way to practice Chika's social skills. Seeing Chika struggle, Kazuhiko insists on taking her place out of concern of her failing, but Chika grows frustrated on how Kazuhiko sees her and runs off. Later, Anna suggests Kazuhiko talk to Chika to know how she feels. After reminiscing with Kaju on how he never tried to influence her with his ideas as they grew up, Kazuhiko realizes what he needs to do. On the day of the club president meeting, Chika attempts to begin her report but stutters and makes mistakes, leading the student council to skip her, much to her and Kazuhiko's frustration. Not wanting the event to negatively impact Chika further, Kazuhiko intervenes and declares himself the new club president against her wishes, leading her to lash out at him. Feeling guilty once more, Kazuhiko looks for her with the help of the other literature club members and finds her in the emergency stairwell. Chika tearfully asks why he acted in her place while sharing her fears of being left alone. Realizing how different he is from Chika, Kazuhiko makes it clear to her alongside Anna and Lemon she is not alone and they will be always there for her. Chika accepts Kazuhiko taking over as president and lets him know they are counting on him.
12	"Am I Actually Just Some Unseasoned Rando Who Drops In for the Last Episode With the Losing Heroine?"; Transliteration: "Ore wa Hyottoshite, Saishū Banashi de Hiroin no Yoko ni iru, Pottode no Mobukyara na no Darō ka" (Japanese: 俺はひょっとして、最終話でヒロインの横にいる、ポッと出のモブキャラなのだろうか)	Akihito Sudō & Shōtarō Kitamura	Akihito Sudō	September 29, 2024
Anna laments on not having a boyfriend, leading Kazuhiko to reluctantly conduct a plan with the literature club to create a fake boyfriend for Anna through a fake date. While Kazuhiko thinks about the details of the date and Anna develops a background for her fake boyfriend, the former receives a ticket to an amusement park from Sayo as a suggestion. The literature club gets to work and Chika, Lemon, and Kazuhiko each give tips to make Anna's date more convincing. During the trip, Kazuhiko and Anna ride a Ferris Wheel, where he suggests Anna stop forcing herself to be in a relationship and let it happen naturally. Realizing she can take it easy, Anna decides to take a break on finding a boyfriend, and Kazuhiko begins to appreciate her even more, only them to be interrogated by Lemon and Chika, asking them what the two of them did alone in the gondola.

=== Other ===
The series had an illustration collaboration with the second volume of the manga series Starting Today, We're Childhood Friends by Midori Obiya. It also had multiple collaborations with Toyohashi Zoo and Botanical Park and JR Central.

Shogakukan released an art book titled Too Many Losing Heroines! Imigimuru ARTWORKS (負けヒロインが多すぎる！いみぎむるARTWORKS) (ISBN 978-4-09-199094-5) on January 26, 2026.

== Reception ==
In the 2022 edition of Takarajimasha's annual light novel guide book Kono Light Novel ga Sugoi!, the novel series ranked 18th in the bunkobon category, and 11th in the new work category. It ranked first in the bunkobon category in 2025.

Both the light novel and the anime series have received positive reviews from critics, highlighting the artstyle, characters, humor and emotional depth.

=== Accolades ===
Year	Award	Category	Recipient	Result	Ref.
2024	Abema Anime Trend Awards	Ending Animation Award	"Love 2000" by Hikaru Tono "Crazy For You" by Shion Wakayama "Feel My Soul" by Momoka Terasawa	Won	
2025	AT-X	Top Anime Ranking	Makeine: Too Many Losing Heroines!	Won	
2025	D-Anime Store Awards	Recommended Anime	Makeine: Too Many Losing Heroines!	Won	
2025	D-Anime Store Awards	Worth Rewatching Anime	Makeine: Too Many Losing Heroines!	Won	
2025	11th Anime Trending Awards	Anime of the Year	Makeine: Too Many Losing Heroines!	Nominated	
2025	11th Anime Trending Awards	Boy of the Year	Kazuhiko Nukumizu	Nominated	
2025	11th Anime Trending Awards	Girl of the Year	Anna Yanami	Nominated	
2025	11th Anime Trending Awards	Best in Adapted Screenplay	Makeine: Too Many Losing Heroines!	Nominated	
2025	11th Anime Trending Awards	Best in Animation	Makeine: Too Many Losing Heroines!	Nominated	
2025	11th Anime Trending Awards	Best in Character Design	Makeine: Too Many Losing Heroines!	Nominated	
2025	11th Anime Trending Awards	Best in Episode Directing and Storyboard	Episode 12: "Am I Actually Just Some Unseasoned Rando Who Drops in for the Last Episode With the Losing Heroine?"	Nominated	
2025	11th Anime Trending Awards	Best in Sceneries and Visuals	Makeine: Too Many Losing Heroines!	Nominated	
2025	11th Anime Trending Awards	Best in Voice Cast	Makeine: Too Many Losing Heroines!	Nominated	
2025	11th Anime Trending Awards	Opening Theme Song of the Year	"Tsuyogaru Girls" by BotchiBoromaru feat. Mossa of Necry Talkie	Nominated	
2025	11th Anime Trending Awards	Ending Theme Song of the Year	"Love 2000" by Hikaru Tono	Nominated	
2025	11th Anime Trending Awards	Comedy Anime of the Year	Makeine: Too Many Losing Heroines!	Won	
2025	11th Anime Trending Awards	Romance Anime of the Year	Makeine: Too Many Losing Heroines!	Nominated	
2025	11th Anime Trending Awards	Best Voice Acting Performance – Female	Hikaru Tono as Anna Yanami	Won	
2025	9th Crunchyroll Anime Awards	Best Romance	Makeine: Too Many Losing Heroines!	Nominated	
2025	9th Crunchyroll Anime Awards	Best Slice of Life	Makeine: Too Many Losing Heroines!	Won	
2025	Japan Expo Awards	Daruma for Best Romance Anime	Makeine: Too Many Losing Heroines!	Nominated	
2025	15th Newtype Anime Awards	Best Work (TV/Streaming)	Makeine: Too Many Losing Heroines!	Won	
2025	15th Newtype Anime Awards	Best Male Character	Kazuhiko Nukumizu	Won	
2025	15th Newtype Anime Awards	Best Studio	A-1 Pictures	Won	
2025	15th Newtype Anime Awards	Best Theme Song	"Tsuyogaru Girls" by BotchiBoromaru feat. Mossa of Necry Talkie	Won	
2025	15th Newtype Anime Awards	Best Voice Actor	Hikaru Tono as Anna Yanami	Won	

== See also ==
- Engage Kiss, the manga adaptation of which is illustrated by Itachi, and was serialized at the same time with Too Many Losing Heroines!
- Haganai, another light novel series whose manga adaptation is illustrated by Itachi
- Lycoris Recoil, an anime series with characters designed by Imigimuru and produced by A-1 Pictures
- This Art Club Has a Problem!, a manga series illustrated by Imigimuru
