= Takibi Amamori =

Japanese light novelist

- 雨森たきび
- Born: Toyohashi, Aichi Prefecture, Japan
- Occupation: Novelist
- Writing career
- Language: Japanese
- Period: 2021-present
- Genre: Light novels
- Notable work: Too Many Losing Heroines!
- Notable awards: 15th Shogakukan Light Novel Award

Takibi Amamori (雨森たきび, Amamori Takibi) is a Japanese novelist. He is best known as the creator of his critically acclaimed debut series Too Many Losing Heroines!, the first volume of which he won the 15th Shogakukan Light Novel Award.

== Overview ==
Amamori grew up and graduated high school in Toyohashi, Aichi Prefecture. He started writing in high school, joining a literary club in university, and began submitting work to newcomer writing competitions, both times having his work rejected in the first round. After graduating university, due to work and not believing he had the talent, Amamori quit writing. He eventually resumed writing again in hopes to pursue his dream career.

In 2020, his novel Ore wa Hyottoshite, Saishuuwa de Make Heroin no Yokoniiru Pottode Mobukyara nano darou ka (俺はひょっとして、最終話で負けヒロインの横にいるポッと出のモブキャラなのだろうか) won the 15th Shōgakukan Light Novel Prize and would debut as the first volume of his debut series Too Many Losing Heroines! in July 2021.

Amamori has stated some of his favorite manga series are The Dangers in My Heart, Kaguya-sama: Love Is War, and This Art Club Has a Problem!, citing the first two as inspirations for his own work.

== Works ==
- Too Many Losing Heroines! (2021–present, Illustrated by Imigimuru); published by Gagaga Bunko in 10 volumes
