= List of works published by Shogakukan =

This is a list of works published by Shogakukan (sorted by release date), including manga published by foreign subsidiaries, books, novels, and light novels.

The list includes titles from:

- Shogakukan Asia
- Viz Media/Viz Communications
- Viz Media Europe (2007–2020)

== 1970s ==
=== 1973 ===
- Shogakukan Random House English–Japanese Dictionary

=== 1974 ===
- Buddhist pictures

== 1980s ==
=== 1982 ===
- The Encyclopedia of World Monsters

=== 1984 ===
- Encyclopedia Nipponica

=== 1986 ===
- Anata no haiku zukuri kigo no aru kurashi

=== 1988 ===
- Kokugo Dai Jiten
- Nausicaä of the Valley of the Wind

== 1990s ==
=== 1990 ===
- 2001 Nights
- Fire Emblem Encyclopedia

=== 1991 ===
- Fire Emblem Tactics
- Nintendo Official Guidebook: Super Mario World
- Shinpen meihō Nihon no bijutsu

=== 1992 ===
- Kyõ kara hajimeru haiku
- Legendary Girls Calendar

=== 1993 ===
- Akumajou Dracula X Rondo of Blood Official Guidebook

=== 1994 ===
- A Chronicle of Ultraman's Youth: Member Fuji's 929 Days
- Fatal Fury: Legend of the Hungry Wolf
- Nintendo Official Guide Book for Super Metroid by Samus Aran 2 Hours 59 Minutes
- Ranma ½: Chougi Rambuhen

=== 1995 ===
- Daijisen
- Ranma ½: Ougi Jaanken
- Theme Park Super Guide
- This is Animation Special: Macross Plus

=== 1996 ===
- Fire Emblem: Genealogy of the Holy War Official Nintendo Guidebook
- Kekkon: Marriage
- Ranma ½: Battle Renaissance
- Tsuribaka Nisshi

=== 1997 ===
- "Oku no hosomichi" o Yuku
- Haiku to deau
- Hajimete no haiku zukuri 5-7-5 no tanoshimi
- Hiroshige Edo meisho ginkō

=== 1998 ===
- Konpakutoban Nihon chimei hyakka jiten
- Sotsugyou III: Wedding Bell
- Zoho shinsoban Daijisen

=== 1999 ===
- Fatal Fury: The Motion Picture

== 2000s ==
=== 2000 ===
- Doraemon no Quiz Boy
- Doraemon no Study Boy: Kuku Game

=== 2001 ===
- Doraemon no Study Boy: Gakushuu Kanji Game
- Shogakukan Progressive Japanese-English Dictionary
- Socrates in Love

=== 2002 ===
- Complete Takemitsu Edition
- Doraemon no Quiz Boy 2
- Mini Moni: Mika no Happy Morning Chatty
- Tōshūsai Sharaku: Full-sized Complete works

=== 2003 ===
- Domon Ken tsuyoku utsukushii mono: Nihon bitanbō
- Doraemon no Study Boy: Kanji Yomikaki Master
- The Genesis Of Ultraman

=== 2005 ===
- After My Downfall
- The Art of My Neighbor Totoro
- Fullmetal Alchemist

=== 2006 ===
- Aishiteruze Baby
- Death Note (Japanese film)

=== 2007 ===
- Bokura no: Alternative
- Freedom: Footmark Days
- Gurren Lagann
- Hayate the Combat Butler
- Humanity Has Declined
- Professor Kageyama's Maths Training: The Hundred Cell Calculation Method

=== 2008 ===
- The Art of Miyazaki's Spirited Away
- Aura: Koga Maryuin's Last War
- Black Lagoon
- Blue Dragpm
- Code-E
- Dances with the Dragons
- Nagi is the Familiar!? Let it ★ World Conquest
- Nightmare Inspector: Yumekui Kenbun
- The Princess and the Pilot

=== 2009 ===
- The Art of Ponyo
- Cop Craft
- Eisen Flügel
- Kai, Sasu.
- The Pilot's Love Song
- RideBack: Cannonball Run
- Sasami-san@Ganbaranai
- Time Mail
- The World God Only Knows

== 2010s ==
=== 2010 ===
- GJ Club
- Nintendo Official Guidebook: Metroid: Other M
- Ōkami Kakushi Miyako Wasure-hen

=== 2011 ===
- Doraemon: Nobita and the Steel Troops
- The Legend of Zelda: Hyrule Historia
- Neon Genesis Evangelion
- Pandora's Tower: Until I Return to Your Side: Nintendo Official Guidebook
- Plumeria

=== 2012 ===
- 07-Ghost
- Encyclopedia of Japan
- Gangsta
- GJ-bu Chūtō-bu
- Gonna be the Twin-Tail!!
- Hoshi no Kābī Pupupu Taizen: 20th Anniversary
- Jinsei
- Kokushi Daijiten
- Love, Election and Chocolate a novel
- Nihon Daihyakka Zensho
- Nihon Kokugo Daijiten
- Nihon Rekishi Chimei Taikei
- Shimoneta

=== 2014 ===
- Assassination Classroom
- Sailor Moon Crystal
- Shârokku Hômuzu Boken Fan Bukku
- Trinity Blood

=== 2015 ===
- Dagashi Kashi: Mō Hitotsu no Natsuyasumi
- Seven Senses of the Reunion
- A Sister's All You Need

=== 2016 ===
- Bottom-tier Character Tomozaki
- Dōdemo Ii Sekai Nante: Qualidea Code
- Yoru wo norikoeru

=== 2017 ===
- Astra Lost in Space
- BanG Dream!
- JoJo's Bizarre Adventure: The Animation
- Mr Kiasu: Everything Also Like Real

=== 2018 ===
- JoJo's Bizarre Adventure: Diamond is Unbreakable (Anime)
- JoJo's Bizarre Adventure: Stardust Crusaders (Anime)
- JoJo's Bizarre Adventure: Stardust Crusaders: Battle in Egypt
- Mazinger Z: Infinity
- Mr Kiasu: Everything Also First Class
- SupeRich

=== 2019 ===
- Beastars
- JoJo's Bizarre Adventure: Golden Wind (Anime)
- P+D BOOKS
- A Tropical Fish Yearns for Snow

== Unsorted ==
- 4 Cours After
- A.D. Police: Dead End City
- Adolf
- Baron: The Cat Returns
- The Big O
- The Doraemons
- Freedom Scenarios

== See also ==
- List of manga published by Shogakukan
