= Hihō: Ojō-sama-kei Teihen Dungeon Haishin-sha =

Japanese light novel series

- First light novel volume cover

【悲報】お嬢様系底辺ダンジョン配信者、配信切り忘れに気づかず同業者をボコってしまう～けど相手が若手最強の迷惑系配信者だったらしく動画がアホほどバズって伝説になってますわ!? (Hihō: Ojō-sama-kei Teihen Danjon Haishin-sha, Haishin Kiriwasure ni Kizukazu Dōgyō-sha o Boko tte Shimau: Kedo Aite ga Wakate Saikyō no Meiwaku-kei Haishin-sha Datta Rashiku Dōga ga Aho hodo Bazutte Densetsu ni Natteimasu wa!?)
- Genre: Comedy
- Novel series
- Written by: Dragon Tanishi
- Published by: Kakuyomu
- Original run: June 2, 2023 – present
- Light novel
- Written by: Hirotaka Akagi
- Illustrated by: Kitsune Fuku
- Published by: Shogakukan
- Imprint: Gagaga Bunko
- Original run: October 18, 2023 – present
- Volumes: 6
- Manga
- Written by: Hirotaka Akagi
- Illustrated by: Kōtarō Yamada
- Published by: Shogakukan
- Imprint: Sunday GX Comics
- Magazine: Sunday Webry
- Original run: June 18, 2025 – present
- Volumes: 4

Hihō: Ojō-sama-kei Teihen Dungeon Haishin-sha (Note: Japanese: 【悲報】お嬢様系底辺ダンジョン配信者、配信切り忘れに気づかず同業者をボコってしまう～けど相手が若手最強の迷惑系配信者だったらしく動画がアホほどバズって伝説になってますわ!?, Hepburn: Hihō: Ojō-sama-kei Teihen Danjon Haishin-sha, Haishin Kiriwasure ni Kizukazu Dōgyō-sha o Boko tte Shimau: Kedo Aite ga Wakate Saikyō no Meiwaku-kei Haishin-sha Datta Rashiku Dōga ga Aho hodo Bazutte Densetsu ni Natteimasu wa!?; '[Sad News] An Aristocratic-type Basic Dungeon Streamer, Not Realizing She Was Still Live, Whaled On Another Streamer, But He Was the Strongest Young Nuisance-type Streamer, and the Recording Went Ridiculously Viral, Becoming Legend?!') is a Japanese light novel series written by Hirotaka Akagi and illustrated by Kitsune Fuku. It was originally serialized as a web novel on the publishing platform Kakuyomu, before Shogakukan began publishing it under their Gagaga Bunko imprint in October 2023. Six volumes have been released as of October 2026. A manga adaptation illustrated by Kōtarō Yamada began serialization on Shogakukan's Sunday Webry service in June 2025 and has been compiled into four tankōbon volumes as of October 2026.

== Plot ==
The series follows Karin Yamada, a 16-year-old streamer who has a rich lady persona. Her videos focus on exploring dungeons, although she has failed to gain any popularity. One day, while exploring a dungeon, she finds another streamer and, seeing that he was holding a dangerous object, attacks him. The incident was accidentally recorded onstream and unexpectedly went viral on social media, giving her channel sudden popularity.

== Media ==
=== Light novel ===
The series is written by Hirotaka Akagi, who originally posted it on Kadokawa's online publishing platform Kakuyomu beginning in June 2023 under the pen name Dragon Tanishi. It was later picked up for publication by Shogakukan, who began releasing it under its Gagaga Bunko imprint with illustrations by Kitsune Fuku. The first volume was released on October 18, 2023; six volumes have been published as of October 2026.

No.	Release date	ISBN
1	October 18, 2023	978-4-09-453157-2
2	March 18, 2024	978-4-09-453183-1
3	December 18, 2024	978-4-09-453213-5
4	June 18, 2025	978-4-09-453246-3
5	October 20, 2025	978-4-09-453267-8
6	October 16, 2026	978-4-09-453311-8

=== Manga ===
A manga adaptation illustrated by Kōtarō Yamada began serialization on Shogakukan's Sunday Webry service on June 18, 2025. The first volume was published on October 17, 2025; four volumes have been released as of October 19, 2026.

No.	Release date	ISBN
1	October 17, 2025	978-4-09-157899-0
2	February 19, 2026	978-4-09-158214-0
3	July 17, 2026	978-4-09-158231-7
4	October 19, 2026	978-4-09-158251-5

== Reception ==
The series ranked 3rd in the Paperback category at the 2024 Tsugi ni Kuru Light Novel Awards. It ranked 16th in the Paperback category at the 2025 edition of Kono Light Novel ga Sugoi!.

In a November 2023 review for Real Sound, reviewer Masamitsu Hosoya praised the first volume, finding Karin's character interesting.

The manga adaptation was nominated for the twelfth Next Manga Award in 2026 in the web category.

== See also ==
- Shimoneta, another light novel series written by Hirotaka Akagi
