= Otome (given name) =

- Gender: Female

Origin
- Origin: Japanese

Other names
- Alternative spelling: 乙女

Otome (おとめ, オトメ) is a feminine Japanese given name.

== Characters ==
- Otome Akiyama (秋山 乙女), a character in Pani Poni Dash
- Otome Arisugawa (有栖川 おとめ), a character in Aikatsu!
- Otome Kato (加藤 乙女), a character in School Days
- Otome Saotome (早乙女 乙女), a character from Shimoneta
- Yamabuki Otome (山吹 乙女), a character in Nura: Rise of the Yokai Clan
