= Toaru =

Toaru may refer to:

- Toaru Majutsu no Index, a 2004 light novel series later adapted into an anime
  - Toaru Kagaku no Railgun, a 2007 manga based on Toaru Majutsu no Index later adapted into an anime
  - Its many other derived works, mainly manga.
- Toaru Hikuushi e no Tsuioku, a 2008 light novel series later adapted into an anime
