= The Tunnel to Summer, the Exit of Goodbyes =

Japanese light novel and its adaptations

- Light novel cover

夏へのトンネル、さよならの出口 (Natsu e no Tonneru, Sayonara no Deguchi)
- Genre: Romance; Science fiction
- Light novel
- Written by: Mei Hachimoku
- Illustrated by: Kukka
- Published by: Shogakukan
- English publisher: NA: Seven Seas Entertainment
- Imprint: Gagaga Bunko
- Published: July 18, 2019
- Manga

The Tunnel to Summer, the Exit of Goodbyes: Ultramarine
- Written by: Mei Hachimoku
- Illustrated by: Koudon
- Published by: Shogakukan
- English publisher: NA: Seven Seas Entertainment
- Magazine: Monthly Sunday Gene-X; MangaONE
- Original run: July 18, 2020 – November 19, 2021
- Volumes: 4
- Anime film
- Directed by: Tomohisa Taguchi
- Produced by: Reiko Sasaki; Masayo Kudou; Nao Matsumura; Taisuke Shiikawa
- Written by: Tomohisa Taguchi
- Music by: Harumi Fuuki
- Studio: CLAP
- Licensed by: Sentai Filmworks
- Released: September 9, 2022
- Runtime: 83 minutes
- icon

The Tunnel to Summer, the Exit of Goodbyes (Japanese: 夏へのトンネル、さよならの出口, Hepburn: Natsu e no Tonneru, Sayonara no Deguchi) is a Japanese light novel written by Mei Hachimoku and illustrated by Kukka, published by Shogakukan under its Gagaga Bunko imprint in July 2019. A manga adaptation, titled The Tunnel to Summer, the Exit of Goodbyes: Ultramarine and illustrated by Koudon, was serialized in Shogakukan's seinen manga magazine Monthly Sunday Gene-X from July 2020 to November 2021, with its chapters collected in four tankōbon volumes. Both the light novel and manga are licensed in North America by Seven Seas Entertainment. An anime film adaptation produced by CLAP premiered in September 2022.

== Plot ==
The story is set in a fictional Japanese city near Kasaki Station, where an urban legend speaks of the "Urashima Tunnel", a mysterious passage said to grant wishes—though at a cost. Kaoru Touno, a reclusive high school boy in a rural town, commutes daily on the Oosara-Sugimori train line. One rainy evening, he meets Anzu Hanashiro, a selfish girl at the station. When Kaoru offers her an umbrella, she reveals she has been alone the whole time, to which he responds with an indifferent "good". They exchange phone numbers before parting ways.

The next day, Anzu transfers into Kaoru's class from Tokyo. Despite the class's attempts to welcome her, her aloof demeanor alienates them, and Anzu injures female classmate Koharu Kawasaki for annoying and bullying her. That night, Kaoru's drunken father blames him for his sister Karen's death, and demanding him to revive her, even at the cost of his life. When the distraught Kaoru flees and stumbles upon the Urashima Tunnel, he retrieves one of Karen's slippers and his deceased pet parrot, before leaving with them and discovering that a week has passed outside.

Kaoru re-enters the tunnel the next day and sees Anzu. They agree to collaborate and fulfill their respective wishes. Over the following weeks, their bond deepens. They learn that time inside the tunnel flows differently—three seconds within equate to two hours outside. During a visit to an aquarium, Anzu confesses her fear of the tunnel, while Kaoru reveals his wish: his sister Karen died falling from a tree after failing to catch a rhinoceros beetle and forgiving him, after an argument. He wishes to undo the past.

During another expedition into the tunnel, Kaoru and Anzu aim to spend precisely 108 seconds inside—equivalent to three days outside—but they exceed this time, emerging at 4 a.m. They retreat to Anzu's apartment, where she explains her own wish: her grandfather, a struggling manga artist, became a burden on her family, and when she expressed her own ambition to follow in his footsteps, her parents disowned her and her grandfather. She desires the talent to become a renowned manga artist. The papers they retrieved from the tunnel are an old manga she wrote as a child, discarded by her father. Kaoru reads it and insists she already possesses talent.

After a summer festival date, Kaoru returns home to find his father with a new partner. The next day, he persuades Anzu to delay their final tunnel trip, but soon afterward, he vanishes. Worrying about Kaoru, Anzu returns to the tunnel and receives a message from Kaoru revealing the tunnel's true nature: it cannot grant wishes, only to restore what was lost. He urges her to pursue her dream as a manga artist so he may one day see her work when he leaves. Heartbroken, Anzu admits she simply wanted to stay with him. Inside the tunnel, Kaoru finds himself reunited with Karen in a fabricated reality. However, he begins receiving messages from the outside—an impossibility—and Karen assures him she will be content as long as he is happy with someone he loves. Realizing his true desire is to be with Anzu, Kaoru accepts Karen's death and resolves to leave.

Eight years pass outside, Anzu has become a moderately successful but disillusioned manga artist. One day, she returns to the train station where she first met Kaoru, confessing she has remembered him. Anzu receives a message from Kaoru and rushes to the tunnel, believing he has emerged. Inside, Kaoru slips and falls before waking up and being reunited with Anzu. They reconcile, before leaving the tunnel—13 years and 102 days after first entering.

== Characters ==
Kaoru Touno (塔野カオル, Tōno Kaoru)
Voiced by: Ouji Suzuka (Japanese); Gabriel Regojo (English)
A high school boy uncomfortably living with his abusive father.
Anzu Hanashiro (花城あんず, Hanashiro Anzu)
Voiced by: Marie Iitoyo (Japanese); Patricia Duran (English)
A high school girl and future manga artist surpassing her grandfather and disowned by her parents.
Shouhei Kaga (加賀翔平, Kaga Shōhei)
Voiced by: Tasuku Hatanaka (Japanese); Scott Gibbs (English)
One of Anzu and Kaoru's classmates.
Koharu Kawasaki (川崎小春, Kawasaki Koharu)
Voiced by: Arisa Komiya (Japanese); Maggie Flecknoe (English)
One of Anzu and Kaoru's classmates.
Hanamoto-sensei (浜本先生)
Voiced by: Haruka Terui (Japanese); Shelley Calene-Black (English)
Kaoru and Anzu's school teacher.
Kaoru's father (カオルの父, Kaoru no Chichi)
Voiced by: Rikiya Koyama (Japanese); John Gremillion (English)
An unnamed man and Kaoru's abusive and workaholic father.
Karen Touno (塔野カレン, Tōno Karen)
Voiced by: Seiran Kobayashi (Japanese); Anna Austin (English)
Kaoru's late sister.

== Media ==
=== Light novel ===
The Tunnel to Summer, the Exit of Goodbyes, written by Mei Hachimoku and illustrated by Kukka, was released by Shogakukan under its Gagaga Bunko imprint on July 18, 2019.

In July 2021, Seven Seas Entertainment announced that they had licensed the light novel for English release in North America. It was released on May 17, 2022.

=== Manga ===
A manga adaptation, The Tunnel to Summer, the Exit of Goodbyes: Ultramarine (夏へのトンネル、さよならの出口 群青, Natsu e no Tonneru, Sayonara no Deguchi Gunjō), illustrated by Koudon, started its serialization in Shogakukan's seinen manga magazine Monthly Sunday Gene-X on July 18, 2020. The series was also published on the MangaONE app. The first part of the final chapter was published on MangaONE on October 1, 2021, and the series finished in Monthly Sunday Gene-X on November 19 of the same year. Shogakukan collected its chapters in four tankōbon volumes, released from December 18, 2020, to December 17, 2021.

In July 2021, Seven Seas Entertainment announced that they had licensed the manga for English release in North America. The first volume was released on July 26, 2022.

==== Volumes ====
No.	Original release date	Original ISBN	English release date	English ISBN
1	December 18, 2020	978-4-09-157619-4	July 26, 2022	978-1-63858-420-9
2	March 18, 2021	978-4-09-157632-3	October 18, 2022	978-1-63858-795-8
3	August 19, 2021	978-4-09-157648-4	February 28, 2023	978-1-63858-977-8
4	December 17, 2021	978-4-09-157666-8	June 13, 2023	978-1-68579-533-7

=== Anime film ===
An anime film adaptation was announced on December 15, 2021. The film was produced by CLAP. It was written and directed by Tomohisa Taguchi, with Tomomi Yabuki designing the characters and serving as chief animation director, and Harumi Fuuki composed the music. It premiered on September 9, 2022. The film's theme song is "Finale" (フィナーレ。, Fināre) by Eill. The film was released on Blu-ray on May 24, 2023.

Sentai Filmworks licensed the film for North America, and Anime Limited acquired the film in the United Kingdom, Ireland, and Malta. It premiered in the United Kingdom on July 14, 2023, and in the United States on November 3 of the same year. Hidive began streaming the film on January 2, 2024. The film was released on Blu-ray on January 10 of the same year.

== Reception ==
The film adaptation won the Paul Grimault Award at the 2023 Annecy International Animation Film Festival. On Rotten Tomatoes, the film has an approval rating of 92% based on 12 reviews, with an average rating of 6.8/10. Writing for The Guardian, Phil Hoad gave the film three out of five stars, describing the plot as simplistic but the animation as "something else", capturing "the momentousness of first love".

== See also ==
- The Mimosa Confessions, a light novel series written by Mei Hachimoku and illustrated by Kukka
