= The Mimosa Confessions =

Japanese light novel series

- First light novel volume cover, featuring Ushio

ミモザの告白 (Mimoza no Kokuhaku)
- Genre: Romance; Drama; Transgender literature
- Light novel
- Written by: Mei Hachimoku
- Illustrated by: Kukka
- Published by: Shogakukan
- English publisher: NA: Seven Seas Entertainment
- Imprint: Gagaga Bunko
- Original run: July 26, 2021 – June 18, 2024
- Volumes: 5

The Mimosa Confessions (ミモザの告白, Mimoza no Kokuhaku) is a Japanese light novel series written by Mei Hachimoku and illustrated by Kukka, published by Shogakukan under its Gagaga Bunko imprint from July 2021 to June 2024. It follows Sakuma, a high schooler who's friends with Ushio, a trans woman. The light novel is licensed in North America by Seven Seas Entertainment. An audiobook adaptation was released in July 2023.

== Premise ==
Sakuma Kamiki is a lonely high school sophomore, living in a "dreary suburb". His childhood best friend, Ushio Tsukinoki, with whom he had a falling out by the time they started high school, is now considered to be one of the most popular boys in the school. Sakuma manages to befriend Natsuki Hoshihara, a girl from their class. While taking a walk through a park at night, he encounters Ushio, dressed in a schoolgirl's uniform and crying. Ushio decides to start living as a girl and comes out to the class.

== Release ==
No.	Title	Original release date	North American release date
1	The Mimosa Confessions (Light Novel) Vol. 1 Mimoza no Kokuhaku (ミモザの告白)	July 26, 2021; 978-4-09-453018-6	June 4, 2024; 979-88-88437-78-0
2	The Mimosa Confessions (Light Novel) Vol. 2 Mimoza no Kokuhaku: 2 (ミモザの告白 2)	January 23, 2022; 978-4-09-453047-6	October 8, 2024; 979-88-916-0075-1
3	The Mimosa Confessions (Light Novel) Vol. 3 Mimoza no Kokuhaku: 3 (ミモザの告白 3)	December 25, 2022; 978-4-09-453104-6	February 4, 2025; 979-88-916-0581-7
4	The Mimosa Confessions (Light Novel) Vol. 4 Mimoza no Kokuhaku: 4 (ミモザの告白 4)	December 18, 2023; 978-4-09-453139-8	June 17, 2025; 979-88-916-0991-4
5	The Mimosa Confessions (Light Novel) Vol. 5 Mimoza no Kokuhaku: 5 (ミモザの告白 5)	June 18, 2024; 978-4-09-453192-3	November 11, 2025; 979-8-89373-769-1

== Reception ==
The Mimosa Confessions ranked fourth in the 2022 edition of Takarajimasha's annual light novel guide book Kono Light Novel ga Sugoi! in the bunkobon category, and second overall among the other new series of that year.

The series was praised for its positive portrayal of sensitive subjects. Critic Ryūichi Taniguchi highlighted how "the harsh stares directed at Ushio as she tries to ease the discomfort she feels about her gender […] bring to light the reality of the current situation where understanding of LGBTQ people is not progressing". Taniguchi ranked The Mimosa Confessions as the sixth best light novel of 2021.

== See also ==
- The Tunnel to Summer, the Exit of Goodbyes, another light novel written by Mei Hachimoku and illustrated by Kukka
