= The Pilot's Love Song =

Japanese light novel and anime series

- First light novel volume cover

とある飛空士への恋歌 (Toaru Hikūshi e no Koiuta)
- Light novel
- Written by: Koroku Inumura
- Illustrated by: Haruyuki Morisawa
- Published by: Shogakukan
- Imprint: Gagaga Bunko
- Original run: February 18, 2009 – January 18, 2011
- Volumes: 5
- Anime television series
- Directed by: Toshimasa Suzuki
- Produced by: Atsushi Aitani; Hideaki Sakaguchi; Ken Kawakita; Kenji Gotou; Takema Okamura; Yumi Terauchi; Yūsuke Kubo
- Written by: Shinichi Inotsume
- Music by: Kow Otani
- Studio: TMS/3xCube
- Licensed by: NA: NIS America
- Original network: Tokyo MX, Sun TV, AT-X, BS Nittele
- Original run: January 6, 2014 – March 31, 2014
- Episodes: 13
- Manga
- Written by: Koroku Inumura
- Illustrated by: Takeshi Kojima
- Published by: Shogakukan
- Magazine: Shōnen Sunday S
- Original run: February 25, 2014 – September 25, 2015
- Volumes: 4

The Pilot's Love Song (とある飛空士への恋歌, Toaru Hikūshi e no Koiuta; lit. 'Love Song for a Certain Pilot') is a Japanese light novel series by Koroku Inumura. It is set in the same fictional universe as Inumura's earlier light novel The Princess and the Pilot. Five volumes were published between 2009 and 2011 by Shogakukan under their Gagaga Bunko imprint. An anime television series by TMS Entertainment aired in Japan from January to March 2014. A manga adaptation was serialized in Shogakukan's Shōnen Sunday Super from February 2014 to September 2015.

== Characters ==
=== Main characters ===
Kal-el Albus (カルエル・アルバス, Karueru Arubasu) / Karl La Hire (カール・ラ・イール, Kāru Ra Īru)
Voiced by: Natsuki Hanae
Kal-el is the former crown prince of the Balsteros Empire, Prince Karl La Hire, whose monarchy was overthrown by the Wind Revolution. While imprisoned with his mother, seeing a plane flying in the sky cemented his aspiration to become a pilot. After a month in the prison, he was adopted by Michael Albus. Due to unpleasant memories of the Wind Revolution, he has an absolute hatred towards Nina Viento. He enters Cadoques High's Aerial Division along with Ariel. He falls in love with Claire Cruz at first sight. After discovering that Claire is actually Nina Viento, his feelings become conflicted. When he remembers his mother's words "to forgive rather than hate", he lets go of all hatred he had for Nina.
Claire Cruz (クレア・クルス, Kurea Kurusu) / Nina Viento (ニナ・ヴィエント, Nina Viento)
Voiced by: Aoi Yūki
Claire is a girl with the power to control wind and was called a witch by people around her because of it. She joined the Wind Revolution as Nina Viento and helped defeat the forces of the Balsteros Empire, but lost her powers in doing so. She later hides her identity as Nina and joins Cadoques High's Aerial Division, where she is Kal-el's flying partner. She falls in love with Kal-el, but is conflicted after realizing he is Karl La Hire. During the final battle with the Sky Clan, she regains her powers. As part of the treaty with the Sky Clan, she is taken to the Holy Spring in order to fulfill their prophecy.
Ariel Albus (アリエル・アルバス, Arieru Arubasu)
Voiced by: Ayana Taketatsu
Ariel is the youngest daughter of Kal-el's adopted family. She is younger than him by one day, but often calls him her younger brother. Due to an injury suffered during a clash with the Sky Clan, she quits pilot school and decides to become a mechanic. She is revealed to have romantic feelings for Kal-el.
Ignacio Axis (イグナシオ・アクシス, Igunashio Akushisu)
Voiced by: Kaito Ishikawa
Ignacio is the son of former King Gregorio La Hire's concubine, and is thus Kal-el's half-brother. Before the Wind Revolution, he and his mother were expelled from the palace, and she died one month later. Due to this, Ignacio swore revenge on the royal family. He becomes Ariel's flying partner in the flight school by default. He often acts cold and aloof, for which Ariel calls him a tsundere. He is Nina Viento's bodyguard and has been since he was a child.

=== Cadoques High, Aerial Division students ===
Noriaki Kashiwabara (ノリアキ・カシワバラ)
Voiced by: Hiro Shimono
More commonly referred to as "Noripii" by his friends, he is Nanako's flying partner. A very loud and energetic person. He is from the same town as Nanako, and is hinted to have feelings for her. His friends jokingly proclaim he is "the best at running away", but despite his fears he volunteers to escort a recon mission in Episode 11, which he barely survives.
Benjamin Sharif (ベンジャミン・シェリフ, Benjamin Sherifu)
Voiced by: Shinnosuke Tachibana
Called Benji by his peers, though mostly by Sharon. He is a calm and level-headed person, and, according to Claire, his school grades are very high. His flying partner is his childhood friend, Sharon, with whom he develops a romantic relationship. His right arm is lost in the battle in episode 11, though he is saved from death by blood loss thanks to an aviator's scarf given to him by Sharon.
Mitsuo Fukuhara (ミツオ・フクハラ)
Voiced by: Shinya Hamazoe
A heavy-set student and intelligent pilot. Known as an "Airplane Otaku" by his peers, he shows incomparable knowledge of aircraft and their associated hardware such as machine guns. His flying partner is Chiharu de Lucia, whom he is in love with. He dies in battle in episode 7, after being grievously wounded while attempting to mark targets for an allied bomber squadron, and then using his plane as a decoy after forcing Chiharu to bail out.
Chiharu de Lucia (チハル・デ・ルシア, Chiharu de Rushia)
Voiced by: Asami Tano
Mitsuo's flying partner, serving as the pilot with Mitsuo navigating. She often refers to him as Micchan (Mitty), and thinks very highly of his aviation knowledge. After Mitsuo's death, she suffers heavily from depression and post-traumatic stress. She personally delivers Mitsuo's medal of honor to his parents after graduation.
Sharon Morcoz (シャロン・モルコス, Sharon Morukosu)
Voiced by: Saori Hayami
Benjamin's flying partner. She is a kind and gentle girl. She is Benjamin's childhood friend, with whom she is romantically involved.
Nanako Hanasaki (ナナコ・ハナサキ)
Voiced by: Yoshino Nanjō
Noriaki's flying partner. She is very cheerful and always smiles. She is from the same town as he is and is hinted to have feelings for him.
Wolfgang Baumann (ウォルフガング・バウマン, Worufugangu Bauman)
Voiced by: Teruyuki Tanzawa
Very tall and kind person. Although he looked like an adult, he was actually the same age as his classmates. He wants to become a pilot to help support his numerous siblings. His flying partner is Marco, who pilots the aircraft with Wolfgang as navigator/gunner. He dies in battle in episode 8, while attempting to cover the retreat of surviving members of his class.
Marco Santos (マルコ・サントス, Maruko Santosu)
Voiced by: Daisuke Motohashi
Wolfgang's flying partner/pilot, an immature kid who looks up to Wolfgang like an older brother. He is injured in battle in episode 8, when his plane's engines are disabled by a Sky Clan fighter, and Wolfgang was killed.
Fausto Fidel Melze (ファウスト・フィデル・メルセ, Fausuto Fideru Meruse)
Voiced by: Sōichirō Hoshi
The son of Leopold Melze, who is of royal blood. Because of his noble status, he is very cocky, and had a standing rivalry with Kal-el over the right to be Claire's flying partner. However, when Isla was threatened by the Sky Clan's enormous air fleet, he sets his differences aside and works with Kal-el to defend the flying island. In episode 8 he dies in battle along with his pilot, when a Sky Clan fighter intercepts them.

=== Cadoques High, Aerial Division teachers ===
Juan Rodrigo Bandereas (ホアン・ロドリゴ・バンデラス, Hoan Rodorigo Banderasu)
Voiced by: Takaya Kuroda
The hot-blooded, "macho" instructor of the "commoner" Centezual flight class. He comes off as arrogant and selfish, and has a surprising tolerance for pain as evidenced by laughing off a punch to the ribs (and yet not a kick in the shins). Juan cares very deeply about his students, going so far as trying to throw technicians off a plane so they wouldn't force students to go onto the battlefield, as well as flying into a war zone alone and unarmed to search for survivors.
Sonia Palez (ソニア・パレス, Sonia Paresu)
Voiced by: Yumi Uchiyama
The cool-headed, professional instructor of the Van Whyl flight class, who comes from the lesser nobility. Juan and Sonia appear to have a mutual respect for each other, but she has a very limited tolerance for his inflated ego. She aids Juan in rescuing Chiharu de Lucia after her plane is shot down, but resigns soon after, when Commander Melze orders the students of Cadoques back into battle.

=== Congress of Isla ===
Luis de Alarcon (ルイス・デ・アラルコン, Ruisu de Ararukon)
Voiced by: Jūrōta Kosugi
Isla's navigation officer, and old friend of Instructor Bandereas, Luis serves as a sort of mentor/foster father towards Claire. He convinced Claire to take up the position as Governor of Isla, and in exchange made arrangements for her to attend the flight school there. Luis is also one of the major reasons Claire was able to continue attending the school, despite Countess Ulshyrra's efforts.
Leopold Melze (レオポルド・メルセ, Reoporudo Meruse)
Voiced by: Yusaku Yara
Commander of the flying battleship Luna Barcos, de facto leader of Isla's military, and father of Fausto. After the initial encounters with the Sky Clan, he underestimates their tactics and equipment, ultimately leading to disastrous losses later on, including the death of his son. He has to order the Cadoques students into battle, pressing their training planes into service as ersatz fighters, which he deeply regrets but sees no alternative.
Amelia Cervantes (アメリア・セルバンテス, Ameria Serubantesu)
Voiced by: Fujiko Takimoto
Isla's Foreign Affairs adviser, though roughly serving as Luis's adjutant and adviser, Amelia takes her job extremely seriously, feeling that humor has no place in it. She is one of the first Isla officers to speak with a Sky Clan pilot, and discovers that their language was very similar.
Marcus Sanchez (マルクス・サンチェス, Marukusu Sanchesu)
Voiced by: Takeshi Maeda
Isla's Finance Minister, who deals with the day-to-day operations of the civilian side of Isla.

=== Kal-el's family ===
Michael Albus (ミハエル・アルバス, Mihaeru Arubasu)
Voiced by: Takashi Matsuyama
Michael is Ariel's biological, and Kal-el's adoptive, father. He had been serving the new Republican government of Balsteros as a mechanic, and was present on the day of Maria La Hire's execution. Finding Kal-el after he had escaped from his jail cell, and seeing the boy's malnourished state, Michael took it upon himself to rescue the boy from his miserable fate and give him a place in his home.
Noelle Albus (ノエル・アルバス, Noeru Arubasu)
Voiced by: Sawako Hata
Noelle is the eldest daughter of the Albus family. She later marries a man named Pedro, and has a child.
Manuelle Albus (マヌエル・アルバス, Manueru Arubasu)
Voiced by: Nana Hamasaki
Manuelle is the second eldest daughter of the Albus family whose hair is the same color as Ariel's.
Gregorio La Hire (グレゴリオ・ラ・イール, Guregorio Ra Īru)
Voiced by: Kenichirou Matsuda
Gregorio was Kal-el's father and the former king of the Balsteros Empire, who was overthrown and executed during the Wind Revolution.
Maria La Hire (マリア・ラ・イール, Maria Ra Īru)
Voiced by: Yuri Amano
Maria was Kal-el's mother who was imprisoned alongside her son in the aftermath of the Wind Revolution. She was held in custody for a considerable time after her husband's execution before her own was carried out. Before the coup and her subsequent imprisonment, Maria was a pilot (though whether in a recreational or military context is not known), and was a big influence in Kal-el's desire to become a pilot.

=== Others ===
Countess Ulshyrra (ウルシラ伯爵夫人, Urushira Hakushaku Fujin)
Voiced by: Chiaki Kanō
Claire's appointed Guardian, and a sort of "wicked stepmother" figure in her life. The Countess forces Claire to adhere to a very strict schedule and curfew, in order for her to fulfill her ceremonial duties as Nina Viento. She has threatened to pull Claire from the flight school numerous times when she felt it was interfering with her official duties. Claire is ultimately removed from the school after the first Sky Clan raids against Isla but this was due solely to Claire's emotional conflict over her role in the Wind Revolution and her feelings towards Kal-el driving her into giving up her identity, and fully becoming Nina Viento, not to the Countess' efforts.
Shizuka Hazome (シズカ・ハゾメ, Shizuka Hazome)
Voiced by: Hana Satō
A student of Cadoques High School, though not a pilot. She has a very unsettling tendency to arrive when least expected, almost as though from thin air, and at awkward times.

=== Holy Levamme Empire ===
Seagull (海猫, Umineko)
A blue single seater aircraft belonging to the Holy Levamme Empire piloted with great skills. It has been confirmed in Toaru Hikūshi e no Yasōkyoku that it's piloted by Charles Karino from The Princess and the Pilot.
Fana Levamme (ファナ・レヴァーム, Fana Revāmu)
High consul of the Holy Levamme Empire, supportive of the alliance between Balsteros and Levamme in order to defeat the Sky Clan.
Marcos Guerrero (マルコス・ゲレロ, Marukosu Gerero)
Voiced by: Ryōta Takeuchi
Commander of Levamme's Holy Spring mission, leading their flagship El Basstel.

=== Sky Clan ===
Silver Fox (銀狐, Gingitsune)
A mysterious pilot of the Sky Clan, encountered multiple times through the series. The pilot, and their squadron, were equipped with enhanced versions of the Sky Clan's standard fighters, and had a personal emblem displayed prominently on the fuselage of their plane. The "Silver Fox" was most likely the Sky Clan's greatest Ace.

== Media ==
=== Light novels ===
Toaru Hikūshi e no Koiuta started as a light novel series, written by Koroku Inumura and illustrated by Haruyuki Morisawa. The series spans five volumes which were published between February 18, 2009, and January 18, 2011, under Shogakukan's Gagaga Bunko imprint. Inumura's earlier light novel, The Princess and the Pilot, is set in the same world, as are his two later series: the two-volume Toaru Hikūshi e no Yasōkyoku and nine-volume Toaru Hikūshi e no Seiyaku.

No.	Release date	ISBN
1	February 18, 2009	978-4-09-451121-5
2	July 17, 2009	978-4-09-451149-9
3	December 18, 2009	978-4-09-451177-2
4	August 18, 2010	978-4-09-451226-7
5	January 18, 2011	978-4-09-451248-9

=== Anime ===
An anime television series adaptation by TMS Entertainment began airing on January 6, 2014, on Tokyo MX. Additionally, the series is airing on Sun TV, AT-X and BS Nittele and is simulcasted in English by Crunchyroll. The series is directed by Toshimasa Suzuki, written by Shinichi Inotsume and the character designer is Hiroki Harada. Its opening theme is "azurite", performed by petit milady, a unit consisting of the voice actresses Aoi Yūki and Ayana Taketatsu, and its ending theme is "Kaze ga Shitteru" (風が知ってる; "The Wind Knows") by Akai Kōen. The series has been licensed for release in North America by NIS America.

==== Episodes ====
No.	Title	Original release date
1	"Island of New Journeys" "Tabidachi no Shima" (旅立ちの島)	January 6, 2014
Kal-El Albus and his younger sister, Ariel are preparing to enter Cadoque's High Aerial Division to train to become military pilots. The high school is located on the flying island known as Isla, where an alliance of three different nations (Kingdom of Qi, Balsteros Republic, and Bentares) hope to commandeer the island and learn more about the prophesied End of the Sky, which are rumored to reveal the secrets about the creation of their world by the god Saint Aldista. After being assigned to their dorms, Kal-El is taking a stroll on the island when he runs into a girl who is having trouble with her bike. He helps fix her bike and offers to take her back to her home in order to make her curfew. Along the way he learns the name of the girl, Claire Cruz, and they enjoy a breathtaking ride through the clouds until Kal-El accidentally crashes the bike. He shares a touching moment with her and they embrace. After he drops her off, he learns that she is of noble blood and he is not allowed to visit her, and he promises to meet her again.
2	"Cadoques High, Aerial Division" "Kadokesu Kōtō Gakkō Hikū-ka" (カドケス高等学校飛空科)	January 13, 2014
The Council of Four, the ruling committee of the island, discusses with the governor Nina Viento about their journey, although there are some doubts about what they will really find at the end. The five month one way journey will take the island through the Holy Spring, a recently discovered place which is important as it is considered a holy site to the followers of Saint Aldista, and then hopefully to the End of the Sky. While shopping in town, Kal-El and Ariel witness a confrontation between regular Cadoque High students and the nobility students, led by Fausto Fidel Melze. Later that night they cook dinner with some of their classmates and new friends: Benjamin Sharif and his childhood friend Sharon Macroz, Wolfgang Baumann, Marco Santos, Noriaki Kashiwabara and his neighbor Nanako Hanasaki, Mitsuo Fukuhara, and Chiharu de Lucia. They learn about each other's dreams and ambitions for being on this trip. As their classes start, they undergo a grueling training from their hot blooded and macho instructor Juan Rodrigo Bandereas. They are told to pair up in order to get ready to train on the planes. To everyone's surprise, a new girl arrives - it's Claire. Despite Fausto wanting to pair up with a fellow beautiful noble, Kal-El beats him to the punch and is able to pair up with Claire. Another student, Ignacio Axis, bitterly looks on, knowing Kal-El to really be Karl La Hire.
3	"The Wind Revolution" "Kaze no Kakumei" (風の革命)	January 20, 2014
In a flashback, Kal-El recalls his time when he was still the crown prince of Balsteros, Karl La Hire. Later that night at dinner, the students meet the seemingly unfriendly Ignacio and wonder why he's even attending the school. The admiral has the students practice dogfighting and shooting, despite the protests of the nobility students' instructor Sonia Palez that they're not ready yet. Nanako tells the others she heard a rumor that Karl La Hire was on the island and had a revenge plot against Nina Viento, but everyone jokingly dismisses the rumor, but it clearly makes Kal-El uncomfortable. More flashbacks reveal that six years prior, Balsteros was the victim of a violent revolution against the monarchy, where rebel forces overran the capital and the Priestess of Saint Aldista, Nina Viento, was able to destroy the fleeing monarchy ships using her ability to manipulate the wind. The captured royal family is forced to humiliatingly bow to the new rulers of Besteros and Nina, and Kal-El's father, the king, is beheaded while he and his mother are imprisoned. While imprisoned, his mother tells him to never hate and forgive when he can, before she is beheaded by the newly formed Besteros Republic. Distraught, he falls into a depression and is adopted by a sympathetic airplane mechanic who convinces the prison warden to pretend that Karl is dead. The next day, while on a training mission, Kal-El and Claire are separated from the rest of the squadron and are forced to make a water landing after getting lost.
4	"Sea of Stars" "Hoshi no Unabara" (星の海原)	January 27, 2014
As a violent storm rages on where Claire and Kal-El are stranded, a search and rescue mission has been deployed to try to locate them. The instructors don't have a lot of hope, but the other students vow to wait for them to be rescued. A clearly worried Ariel recalls when she first met Kal-El, who was introduced as an adopted new brother by the mechanic who rescued Kal-El. Despite not getting along at first because of seeing him as a rival, she soon sympathizes with him after learning about his dead parents, herself having lost her mother. She also learns about his secret of being the former crown prince. Meanwhile, Kal-El and Claire attempt to stay warm and in high spirits, and he tells her about the first time his adopted father takes him flying, which started his love for flying. They are soon rescued the next day, and a clearly angry Ariel beats him up for worrying her so much. Claire returns to her home, and the countess scolds her for being reckless and makes known her disapproval for Claire joining the flying corps. She then has Claire change into a different outfit, and it's shown that Claire is actually Nina Viento.
5	"The Girl Who Calls the Wind" "Kaze Yobi no Shōjo" (風呼びの少女)	February 3, 2014
As time passes, the students get better at shooting and flying, but are soon taught in a grueling lesson by their instructors on how to do ground fighting. After an exhausting training, they enjoy their time by swimming and playing in a nearby lake. Claire and Kal-El separate from the group and share a romantic moment in the nearby forest. Later, Kal-El recalls his motives for joining the Isla group after being presented an offer from the government, knowing it is his chance to get revenge on Nina. Claire runs into him at school the next day, and is stunned by the similarity that Kal-El has with the former crown prince. She recalls her past: her family and community shunned her for her powers and tried to kill her, but she was able to obliterate the town. A priest from the Saint Aldista church was able to take her into control her powers, and she remembers the deaths of Karl's parents and his hatred towards her, and soon regrets her actions. Falling into a depression because of this, she is paid a visit by the island's navigator, Luis de Alarcon, and asked to join the island of Isla, and she accepts, changing her name to Claire. The students begin to learn how to dogfight, and it is clear that the tag team of Claire and Kal-El is far above the rest. On one practice run, they are shocked to see an invading force of planes, which are learned to be from Sky Clan, a once thought mythical nation that protected the Holy Spring.
6	"The Holy Spring" "Seisen" (聖泉)	February 10, 2014
The Isla's planes and defense system is easily able to destroy the inferior Sky Clan's attacking planes, and later in a Council meeting Admiral Leopold Melze is clearly confident of their abilities to hold off the Sky Clan's planes. Foreign Secretary Amelia Cervantes is more cautious and wants to send more recon, and they end up agreeing to a truce where the students will be used to do recon on the enemy forces. The students host a restaurant that night where they save tasty ramen to the citizens of the island. The two instructors, Juan and Sonia have dinner at the restaurant with the navigator Luis, and Luis expresses his concern of using training students to do recon. Chiharu overhears this and is clearly worried, and later that night talks with Mitsuo, who she is starting to have feelings for, telling him to be safe.
7	"A Glorious Death" "Sange" (散華)	February 17, 2014
An initial invading force by the Sky Clan is easily destroyed by the Isla defense group, so Admiral Melze orders all planes to commence a full scale bombing attack of the enemy's headquarters while at the same time they all marvel at the beauty of the Holy Spring. The students are sent on their first mission to provide recon of the area, but as they are about to go, Claire and Ignacio are pulled out of the group by Claire's countess, who warns her and his life are too important to lose. Furthermore, Ignacio will be appointed as her bodyguard. The attacking Isla planes easily destroy the inferior Sky Clan planes and pursue, but Chiharu and Mitsuo soon spot another carrier force which appear to be way more powerful than the ones that the Isla planes are attacking. They are able to relay the information back to HQ, who realize that the fleet they are attacking is a decoy. The rest of the students learn about Chiharu and Mitsuo still monitoring the enemy fleet. Feeling emboldened, Chiharu and Mitsuo continue to provide recon for the attacking Isla planes on the new enemy fleet and bombers. However, Mitsuo is shot by an enemy plane and badly wounded, and orders Chiharu to escape by parachute before he commandeers the plane away from her, to his death. The training pilots hear over the radio that the Isla attacking planes have walked into an ambush and that more enemy planes are now preparing to bombard Isla, and prepare to defend the island on their own.
8	"The Name of the Bird" "Tori no Namae" (鳥の名前)	February 24, 2014
As the Sky Clan planes start bombing the island, the Van Whyl class plus some of the Cadoques High regular students engage the enemy. However, the students realize they are clearly outclassed by the more powerful Sky Clan planes and Fausto, now the acting leader, orders a defensive stationary circular formation. Back on the ground, Benjamin, Sharon, Nanako, and Noriaki help to lead a ground defense by invading Sky Clan paratroopers. Claire attempts to intervene, but Ignacio refuses to let her shoot, instead demonstrating his skills by killing multiple enemy paratroopers with ease. Back in the air, the students' planes are getting picked off one by one, and Fausto orders a retreat through enemy fire to get back to Isla. In the process Fausto and Wolfgang are killed, and Marco and Ariel are badly wounded. A desperate Kal-El attempts to get back to the island, not wanting to see his sister die, but they are pursued by multiple enemy planes. Just when things seem lost, another unidentified plane bearing the flag of a seagull arrives, and soon shoots down all of the enemy planes. This new ally helps buy Kal-El time to get back to the island. The next day, the clean up begins and Kal-El and Ariel share a close sibling moment as she lies in the hospital bed. Meanwhile the Council manages to translate the contents of a message delivered by the unknown ally plane: the unknown plane comes from the Holy Levamme Empire, another nation who shares similar religious beliefs and a curiosity to discover the Holy Spring, and they desire to meet the people of Isla.
9	"Your Name Is" "Kimi no Na wa" (きみの名は)	March 3, 2014
The next day, a funeral is held to memorize the deaths of those that were lost in the battle of Isla. The students hold a separate memorial service to memorize the students and their friends that died protecting the island, and Chiharu breaks down when she lays a wreath for Mitsuo. The Council considers the request from the Holy Levamme Empire and decides it's better to pursue a temporary alliance against a common enemy, while also deciding to temporarily retreat from the Holy Springs. Kal-El spots Claire laying wreathes in secret for the fallen students, and she tells him she's not worthy of being here as she felt like she abandoned her classmates in a time of need. However he tells her not to worry and that he always wants to see her, and they share a tender kiss. Afterwards, Claire asks if he is Karl La Hire. Shocked by this revelation, he soon realizes that Claire is Nina Viento, and Nina/Claire tells him it is the last time they will ever meet, as Sky Clan planes begin bombing the island again. Ariel and the others are worried about him as he coops up in his room, depressed. Later that day, Nina gives a speech to the people, promising that they will find the Holy Springs and find the truth. Ariel now realizes why Kal-El is depressed, and runs up to Nina, learning from her that she is not able to fly anymore, but Ariel promises to have Kal-El fly again. A clearly worried Ariel continues to try to help her brother, but to no avail, even after telling him that she is quitting to be a mechanic because of her injuries. Frustrated, Ignacio drags him out of his room and begins attacking him in the lake outside the school.
10	"Sky of Courage" "Yūki no Sora" (勇気の飛翔（そら）)	March 10, 2014
Ignacio tells his backstory: he was the son of the concubine of the king, making Kal-El his half brother. Barely acknowledged and forced to work hard in the palace, he and his mother are kicked out as the revolution draws closer. After his mom dies, he clearly resents Kal-El and the kingdom and promises to destroy everything. Ignacio douses Kal-El with a cold dose of reality on how he is running away from his problems, which shocks Kal-El from hearing the truth. Meanwhile, Nina continues to practice her now lost ability to control the wind, to no avail. An observation plane is launched to scout the enemy forces, but with little trained pilots or planes left, Admiral Melze is forced to use the students to help provide defense. An outraged Sonia quits her commission and urges the students to leave, knowing this is a suicide mission for the students. While many students follow her call, Benjamin, Ignacio, Noriaki, and Kal-El volunteer to go, to the dismay of the girls. Unfortunately, the observation plane sent by the military is shot down, leaving only the two training planes left in the air. Even worse, the enemy battleship deploys a smokescreen, causing confusion among Isla HQ.
11	"Love Song" "Koiuta" (恋歌)	March 17, 2014
While Ignacio and Kal-El continue to shoot down enemy planes, Benjamin and Noriaki spot the enemy battleship and begin providing recon about the enemy's position back to HQ. Although hesitant to use the students' reports at first, Admiral Melze is convinced by Nina that they are up for the job, and the two students are made temporary recon observers. Their accurate data is enough to get the Isla battleship's guns trained on the enemy battleship, but their plane is shot down in the process, with Benjamin losing his right hand before they bail out. A clearly angry Kal-El and Ignacio begin to shoot down the Sky Clan planes, but another squad of Sky Clan planes fire missiles at the exposed Isla battleship, causing severe damage including primary and backup engines to fail and the battleship to start falling out of the sky. Kal-El is able to pilot the plane by the sinking battleship, and tells them they will guide the battleship. Nina, seeing this, runs outside and is able to confess her love to him, even though Kal-El can't hear her. She then is able to summon her lost powers to summon a massive windstorm to completely obliterate the attacking Sky Clan planes, and then carry the sinking Isla battleship back to the island. Back on the island, it is revealed Juan managed to rescue Benjamin and Noriaki.
12	"The End Of The Sky" "Sora no Hate" (空の果て)	March 24, 2014
The remaining students continue to provide recon for the island while the commanding officer from the Holy Levamme Empire, Marcos Guerrero, meets with the Council and Nina. He is amazed by how similar Nina is to their empress, and invites her to meet the empress one day. He explains that he has been sent to also discover the Holy Spring by his country but have faced a stubborn resistance from the Sky Clan, who take no negotiations with others trying to discover the Holy Spring. He warns that further attacks will destroy both of their fleets as the Sky Clan is too powerful to defeat in their current states. A messenger arrives with a message from the Sky Clan and to the group's surprise the Sky Clan will agree to a truce under one condition: that they turn over Nina to Sky Clan, as she is prophesied to be Saint Aldista's daughter and is an important figure in their beliefs. They are even willing to allow the fleets to pass through their territory in exchange for Nina. Despite the council's protests, Nina agrees to go to save the fleets. The students learn of this and Kal-El is not happy and talks to Ariel about this. He is surprised that Ariel is being somewhat cold towards his response also and wonders what it could be. The day of her departure, the two meet Nina and share a final embrace with her, and as she is leaving, Kal-El yells to her he will find the End of the Sky and find her someday no matter how many years it will take. Impressed, Ignacio vows to protect her on behalf of Kal-El until he returns one day. The combined fleet soon passes through the Holy Spring and reaches the End of the Sky, a beautiful rainbow like phenomenon, and are stunned to learn that their beliefs exist are true. With everyone safely evacuated to the fleet, the island of Isla passes through the End of the Sky and is reabsorbed.
13	"To The Sky Where You Are" "Kimi no Iru Sora e" (きみのいる空へ)	March 31, 2014
The council, along with the Levamme representatives, begin to learn more about their world. Their world is made up of three layers, with waterfalls separating each layer much like a staircase, and their world is supported by bedrock. At the end of their world is the End of the Sky, which allows for water to be reabsorbed back into the Holy Spring. The fleet is also able to pass through the End of the Sky and reappear at the other side, much to their amazement. Luis calls in Kal-El, and Admiral Merze is shocked to learn that Kal-El is actually Karl, the former crown prince. As they return home, Luis gives a speech detailing their adventure to a stunned populace back home. Karl is presented to the crowd, much to their disbelief as he is thought to have been dead this entire time. In his speech, he details his adventure and vows to retrieve Nina back from Sky Clan and force relations with them, and proclaims his love for her, much to the crowd's delight. This is all revealed to be a plot by the Foreign Secretary, Amelia, who sees this as a way to gain support using romantic drama to achieve their goals of getting Nina back. The students embrace and celebrate their graduation. Some time passes, and everyone has moved on with their lives. Karl is now a real military pilot and is ready to begin his mission to retrieve Nina back. As he leaves, Ariel punches him one more time, but it is clear that she is uncertain about her feelings for her adopted brother. The combined fleet once again approaches Sky Clan, and it's clear Sky Clan is waiting, and they prepare to do battle once more over the skies.

=== Manga ===
A manga adaptation by Takeshi Kojima was serialized in Shogakukan's shōnen manga magazine Shōnen Sunday S from February 25, 2014, to September 25, 2015. Shogakukan collected its chapters in four tankōbon volumes, released from July 18, 2014, to November 18, 2015.
