= Momoko Kuroda =

Japanese poet (1938–2023)

Momoko Kuroda (黒田 杏子, Kuroda Momoko; 10 August 1938 – 13 March 2023) was a Japanese haiku poet and essayist.

== Early life and career ==
Born in Tokyo, Japan, she moved at the age of six with her family to Tochigi Prefecture to flee the wartime B-29 aerial bombing of Tokyo. She spent the rest of her childhood in the Tochigi countryside, returning to Tokyo when she entered Tokyo Woman's Christian University, majoring in psychology. After graduation, she was hired by Hakuhodo, an advertising firm where she worked until retirement at age 60, rising to a senior management position.

== Haiku ==
the white leek
—a beam of light—
now I'll chop it

— Momoko Kuroda

Momoko Kuroda was exposed to haiku at an early age through her mother, who was a member of a local haiku group. Upon her mother's encouragement, she sought out Yamaguchi Seison (1892–1988) and asked to join his haiku group when she was in university. After graduating university, she stopped composing haiku for a period of nearly ten years, then returned to the art and to Seison's haiku group in 1968. That same year, she began what became her trademark haiku pilgrimages, the first of which was to Japan's famous cherry blossoms and spanned 28 years. In 2012, she completed a 30-year endeavor leading haiku pilgrimages to Japan's four main pilgrimage routes: The Shikoku, Saigoku, Bandõ, and Chichibu circuits. In 1990, after the death of her mentor Seison, she created a nationwide haiku organization, AOI (藍生), which she led, and Aoi, a haiku magazine.

Kuroda's first haiku collection, ki no isu (The Wooden Chair) published in 1981, received the Best Modern Woman Haiku Poet award and the Haiku Poets Association Best New Talent award. Her fifth haiku collection, Nikkõ Gekkõ (Sunlight, Moonlight) earned her the prestigious 2011 Dakotsu prize. She was a haiku selector for the Nihon Keizai Shimbun.

Kuroda did not speak or write in English. Abigail Friedman, a United States diplomat based in Tokyo who attended Kuroda's haiku groups, was inspired to write a book about her experience, The Haiku Apprentice: Memoirs of Writing Poetry in Japan (2006). Friedman published 100 of Kuroda's haikus in English translation in the book I Wait for the Moon: 100 Haiku of Momoko Kuroda (2014).

== Death ==
Kuroda died from a brain haemorrhage on 13 March 2023, at the age of 84.

== Selected works ==
=== Haiku collections ===
- Ki no Isu. Bokuyōsha, 1981
- Mizu no Tobira. Bokuyōsha, 1983
- Ichiboku Issō. Kashinsha, 1995
- Kaka Sōjō. Kadokawa Shoten, 2005
- Nikkō Gekkō. Kadokawa, 2010
- Ginga Sanga. Kadokawa, 2013

=== Other works ===
- Anata no haiku zukuri kigo no aru kurashi. Shogakukan, 1986
- Kyõ kara hajimeru haiku. Shogakukan, 1992
- Haiku, hajimete mimasenka. Rippū Shobō, 1997
- Kuroda momoko saijiki. Rippū Shobō, 1997
- Haiku to deau. Shogakukan, 1997
- Hajimete no haiku zukuri 5-7-5 no tanoshimi. Shogakukan, 1997
- Hiroshige Edo meisho ginkō. Shogakukan, 1997
- "Oku no hosomichi" o Yuku. Shogakukan, 1997 (with photography by Ueda Shōji)
- Katengecchi. Rippū Shobō, 2001
- Shōgen: Shōwa no haiku. Two volumes. Kadokawa, 2002
- Kigo no kioku. Hakusuisha, 2003
- Nuno no saijiki. Hakusuisha, 2003
- Shikoku henro ginkō. Chūō Kōron Shinsha, 2003
- Kaneko Tōta yōjōkun. Hakusuisha, 2005
- Haiku rettō nihon sumizumi gin’yū. Iizuka Shoten, 2005
- Haiku no tamatebako. Iizuka Shoten, 2008
- Kurashi no saijiki. Iwanami Shoten, 2011
- Tegami saijiki. Hakusuisha, 2013
- Kataru Tōta waga haiku jinsei. Iwanami Shoten, 2014

== Awards ==
- 1975 Natsukusa New Poet Award
- 1982 Best Modern Woman Haiku Poet award for Ki no Isu
- 1982 5th Haiku Poets Association Best New Talent award for Ki no Isu
- 1986 Natsukusa Award
- 1995 Haiku Poets Association award for Ichiboku Issō
- 2008 1st Katsura Nobuko award
- 2011 45th Dakotsu Prize for Nikkō Gekkō

== Works cited ==
- Friedman, Abigail (8 October 2014). I Wait for the Moon: 100 Haiku of Momoko Kuroda. Berkeley: Stone Bridge Press. ISBN 978-1611720167.
- Friedman, Abigail (2006). The Haiku Apprentice: Memoirs of Writing Poetry in Japan. Berkeley: Stone Bridge Press.
- Ueda, Makoto, ed. (2003). Far Beyond the Field: Haiku by Japanese Women. Translations from the Asian Classics. New York: Columbia University Press. ISBN 0231128630.
