= Eisen Flügel =

Japanese light novel series

- First light novel volume cover

アイゼンフリューゲル (Aizenfuryūgeru)
- Genre: Adventure
- Light novel
- Written by: Gen Urobuchi
- Illustrated by: Higashiguchi Chūō
- Published by: Shogakukan
- Imprint: Gagaga Bunko
- Original run: July 17, 2009 – December 18, 2009
- Volumes: 2
- Manga
- Written by: Gen Urobuchi
- Illustrated by: Anno Nanakamado
- Published by: Shogakukan
- Magazine: Hibana (2016–2017); MangaONE (2017–2018)
- Original run: May 7, 2016 – September 23, 2018
- Volumes: 4
- Anime film
- Directed by: Seiji Mizushima (chief); Daizen Komatsuda
- Written by: Seiji Mizushima; Yukie Sugawara
- Music by: Yuki Kajiura
- Studio: A-1 Pictures

Eisen Flügel (Note: German for "Iron Wings") (アイゼンフリューゲル, Aizenfuryūgeru) is a Japanese light novel series written by Gen Urobuchi and illustrated by Higashiguchi Chūō. The series was published in two volumes under Shogakukan's Gagaga Bunko light novel imprint from July to December 2009. The series was also adapted into a manga series illustrated by Anno Nanakamado, which was serialized from May 2016 to September 2018. An anime film adaptation produced by A-1 Pictures has been announced.

== Plot ==
Set in a world where dragons dominate the skies and humanity remains confined to the ground, human engineers continue to develop experimental aircraft in an effort to challenge dragon supremacy in the air. The story follows Karl Schnitz, a young pilot from the Silvanna Republic chosen to pilot the Blitzvogel, the world's first jet-powered aircraft which hopes to surpass the speed of the Kaiser Drache, the fastest dragon.

== Media ==
=== Light novel ===
No.	Release date	ISBN
1	July 17, 2009	978-4-09-451146-8
2	December 18, 2009	978-4-09-451180-2

=== Manga ===
A manga adaptation, illustrated by Anno Nanakamado, started serialization in Shogakukan's Hibana magazine on May 7, 2016, and ran there until the magazine ceased publication on August 7, 2017. The series later moved to Shogakukan's MangaONE app, where it ran from December 17, 2017, to September 16, 2018. Its chapters were collected in four tankōbon volumes, released between September 23, 2016, and November 12, 2018.

No.	Japanese release date	Japanese ISBN
1	September 23, 2016	978-4-09-187827-4
2	April 7, 2017	978-4-09-189399-4
3	September 19, 2018	978-4-09-189839-5
4	November 12, 2018	978-4-09-860175-2

=== Anime film ===
On September 24, 2022, during the Aniplex Online Fest 2022 event, an anime film adaptation produced by A-1 Pictures was announced. The film is directed by Daizen Komatsuda, with Seiji Mizushima serving as chief director, Yukie Sugawara writing the screenplay along with Mizushima, Keigo Sasaki adapting Takashi Takeuchi's original character designs for animation, Kanetaki Ebikawa, Takayuki Yanase, and Fumihiro Katagai serving as mechanical designers, Tatsuya Yoshikawa serving as dragon designer, and Yuki Kajiura composing the music.
