= Mei Hachimoku =

Japanese light novel author (born 1994)

- 八目迷
- Born: July 29, 1994 (age 32); Himeji, Hyōgo Prefecture, Japan
- Occupation: Novelist
- Writing career
- Period: 2019–present
- Genre: Light novel

Mei Hachimoku (八目迷, Hachimoku Mei; born July 29, 1994) is a Japanese author. He wrote the light novel series, The Tunnel to Summer, the Exit of Goodbyes and The Mimosa Confessions.

== Biography ==
Hachimoku was born in Himeji, Hyōgo Prefecture. He grew up in the remote area of Kansai. While in high school, he started writing derivative works of his favorite manga and video games. His first light novel series won both the Gagaga Award and the Special Jury Award at the 2019 Shogakukan Light Novel Taishō. It was later released under the title The Tunnel to Summer, the Exit of Goodbyes. He was inspired to write it by the film Interstellar. The novel was adapted into a manga and an anime film.

His second work, The Mimosa Confessions series, ranked second overall among the new series of 2022 in Takarajimasha's annual light novel guide book Kono Light Novel ga Sugoi!. The series, which features a transgender woman as one of the main characters, was praised for its positive portrayal of sensitive LGBTQ subjects. It was published in five volumes from July 2021 to June 2024.

== Works ==
- 2019: The Tunnel to Summer, the Exit of Goodbyes (夏へのトンネル、さよならの出口, Natsu e no Tonneru, Sayonara no Deguchi)
- 2020: Wait For Me Yesterday in Spring (きのうの春で、君を待つ, Kinou no Haru de, Kimi wo Matsu)
- 2021–2024: The Mimosa Confessions (ミモザの告白, Mimoza no Kokuhaku)
- 2022: An Autumn in Amber, a Zero-Second Journey (琥珀の秋、0秒の旅, Kohaku no Aki, 0-byou no Tabi)
- 2024–2025: Frieren the Novel: Prelude (小説 葬送のフリーレン～前奏～, Shōsetsu Sōsō no Frieren: Zensō)
- 2026: The Neverending Winter, the Land of Broken Dreams (終わらない冬、壊れた夢の国, Owaranai Fuyu, Kowareta Yume no Kuni)
