= Gagaga Bunko =

Japanese publishing imprint

Gagaga Bunko (ガガガ文庫) is a light novel publishing imprint affiliated with the Japanese publishing company Shogakukan. It was established in May 2007. The imprint is aimed at a male audience, while its sister imprint that was established at the same time, Lululu Bunko, is aimed at a female audience. In May 2008, Shogakukan introduced a separate imprint titled Gagaga Bunko R or Gagaga Bunko Revival, which republishes works from the defunct label Super Quest Bunko.

== Published titles ==
=== !–9 ===
Title	Author	Illustrator	No. of volumes
4 Cours After	Yume Mizusawa	Bun150	4

=== A ===
Title	Author	Illustrator	No. of volumes
Akaoni wa Mō Nakanai	Tsuzuri Akesaka	Yukiko Horiguchi	1
Akunaki Yoku no Sacrament	Kyōhei Koyama	Pellagra	2
Ano Natsu, Saigo ni Mita Uchiage Hanabi wa	Tamaki Suketomo	Yu Akinashi	1
Asobi no Jikan	Motōka Tōsei	Kuinji 51-gou	1
Aura: Maryūinkōga Saigo no Tatakai	Romeo Tanaka	Mebae	1

=== B ===
Title	Author	Illustrator	No. of volumes
Black&Blue	Junichirō Nakaoka	Yō Fujishiro	1
Black Lagoon	Gen Urobuchi	Rei Hiroe	1
Boku no Jimi na Jinsei ga Kuzu Aniki no Sei de Ero Comedy ni Natteiru.	Kakeya Akatsuki	Sora Narusawa	1
Bokura no: Alternative	Renji Ōki	Mohiro Kitoh	5
Bullet Butlers	Yūichirō Higashide	Higashiguchi Chūō	2
Burin Crossroad	Fukami Makoto	Rebis	4
Busou Shinki	Boncho Kuga	Kyōko Kametani, Teruko Arai, Yukie Akitani	3
Butsuriteki ni Koritsu shiteiru Ore no Kōkō Seikatsu	Kisetsu Morita	Mika Pikazo	4

=== C ===
Title	Author	Illustrator	No. of volumes
Chishio no Iro ni Saku Hana wa	Suzume Kirisaki	Refeia	2
Chitose-kun wa Ramune Bin no Naka	Hiromu	raemz	8
Chōsō – Mada Ningen ja nai	Enami Mitsunori	Jun Kumaori	2
Code-E	Ichirō Sakaki	Kōji Ogata	1
Cop Craft: Dragnet Mirage Reloaded	Shoji Gatoh	Range Murata	6
Crazy Heart wa Nusumanai	Setsuna Kannazuki	Nyanya	2
Cross World Alchemica	Kazuki Ikami	Itsuwa Katō	2
Crown Flint	Yasuaki Mikami	Keiichi Sumi	4

=== D ===
Title	Author	Illustrator	No. of volumes
Dagashi Kashi: Mō Hitotsu no Natsu Yasumi	Manta Aisora	Manta Aisora	1
Dat Revenge	Hideaki	ky	1
Datsuiden	Hisa Ōtani	Tomoe Sasamori	2
Deatte Hitotsuki de Zecchou Jorei!	Hirotaka Akagi	Matarou	2
Dorobō no Meijin	Mitsuru Nakazato	Shimeko	1
Dōdemo Ii Sekai Nante: Qualidea Code	Wataru Watari	Saitom	1

=== E ===
Title	Author	Illustrator	No. of volumes
Eisen Flügel	Gen Urobuchi	Chūō Higashiguchi	2
Evolution	Ryo Suzukaze	Kazuyuki Yoshizumi	2
Exmod	Okina Kamino	Kozō	2
Exorsister	Yasuaki Mikami	Mimori Mizusawa	6

=== F ===
Title	Author	Illustrator	No. of volumes
Flick & Break	Keisuke Masano	Panda	3
Freedom: Footmark Days	Kō Furukawa	Daisuke Sajiki, Yoshihiro Sono	3
Fuayu	Muzina Imazi	Shidu	1
Fusen Muteki no Virgin Knife	Kisetsu Morita	Niito	7

=== G ===
Title	Author	Illustrator	No. of volumes
Gakuen Kageki!	Susumu Yamakawa	Yoshi Wo	6
Geinin Destination	Mukai Tenshin	Kin no Tama	4
Gekisen Mahōshi	Ochikobore	Ichiyan	3
Gekkō no Carnevale	J Sairō	Shinya Ōsaki	3
GEφ	Shin Araki	Aruya	2
Gishin Renshin	Maruyama Hideto	ATARU	1
GJ-bu	Shin Araki	Aruya	10
GJ-bu Chūtō-bu	Shin Araki	Aruya	8
GJ-bu Lost Time	Shin Araki	Aruya	1
GJ-bu Weekly	Shin Araki	Aruya	1

=== H ===
Title	Author	Illustrator	No. of volumes
Hakozoko no Elpis	Takehiko Okishi	toi8	4
Hamlet Syndrome	Mitsuhide Kabayama	Miho Takeoka	1
Hanasakeru Aerial Force	Hikaru Sugii	Ruroo	1
Hanashima-san	Isa Amamiya	Shizu Yamauchi	1
Hare no Hi wa Gakkō wo Yasumitai!	Boncho Kuga	Kippu	1
Hatsukoi Continue	Nakahiro	wingheart	2
Hatsukoi Geinin	Takeshi Nakazawa	Eri Kamijo	1
Hayate no Gotoku!	Toshihiko Tsukiji	Kenjiro Hata	2
Hazuki Rion no Teikoku	Ryūsei Shidō	Ninozen	10
Henjin no Salad Bowl	Yomi Hirasaka	Kantoku	5
Hikikomori-hime o Utawasetai!	Futekigō Misaka	Ako Arisaka	1
Hiiragi Ache	Yutaka Kaizu	Yasumo	1
Hiraura Familism	Ryūichi Amane	Yū Sakamoto	1
Hōkago Idol	Hajime Kamoshida	TNSK	1
Hoshū Class no Debuggers	Midori Natsu	Takashi Iwasaki	2
Hyōkai no Leqkel	Jin Akime	Kaito Shibano	1

=== I ===
Title	Author	Illustrator	No. of volumes
Ibara no Majinai-shi	Hisa Ōtani	Saku Mochiduki	3
Imōto sae Ireba Ii.	Yomi Hirasaka	Kantoku	14
Irina: The Vampire Cosmonaut	Keisuke Masano	Karei	6
Isekai Shūgaku Ryokō	Takuya Okamoto	Shirabi	5
Itaikena Shujin	Mitsuru Nakazato	Shimeko	1
Itsuwaru Kami no Sniper	Subaru Mizuno	Magomago	1

=== J ===
Title	Author	Illustrator	No. of volumes
Jaku-chara Tomozaki-kun	Yūki Yaku	Fly	10
Jana-ken no Yūutsu na Jikenbo	Kantarō Sakaida	Yukiko Horiguchi	3
Jashin Ōnuma	Ougyo Kawagishi	Ixy	8
Jinrui wa Suitai Shimashita	Romeo Tanaka	Tōru Yamasaki (2007–2011), Sunaho Tobe	9
Jinsei	Ougyo Kawagishi	Meruchi Nanase	10 + 1 side story
Joshi Mote na Imōto to Junan na Ore	Natsu Midori	Gin	9
Jūmokusō	Mitsunori Enami	Jun Kumaori	1

=== K ===
Title	Author	Illustrator	No. of volumes
Kakuriyo no Mijikai Uta	Hachiyo Ōkuwa	pomodorosa	3
Kami Nomi zo Shiru Sekai	Mamizu Arisawa	Tamiki Wakaki	2
Kaze ni Norite Ayumumono	Woodal Harada	Ringo	1
Kemonogari	Yūichirō Higashide	Hiroki Shinagawa	8
Kemono no Kanzume	Tasuku Fujihara	Nidy-2D-	1
Ken to Mahō no Fantasy	Romeo Tanaka	Ebira	1
Kikaijikake no Bloodhound	Riu Tsuiheiji	Maruino	3
Kiki Senki	Senshū Watanabe	Ryp	1
Kimi ga Boku wo	Mitsuru Nakazato	Ako Yamada	4
Kimi to wa Chimeiteki na Zure ga aru	Kakeya Akatsuki	Akira Banpai	1
Kimoiman	Ken Nakazawa	Ogipote	2
Kirugumi	Yuu Takeuchi	Posuka Demizu	3
Koi ni Hensuru Overwrite	Moguse Kimura	Suburi	1
Koi no Cupid wa Handgun wo Buppanasu.	Kanzaki Shiden	Aki	1
Koi to Senkyo to Chocolate	Yasuaki Mikami	AIC, Naoto Ayano	1
Kōkōsei Maō no Ketsudan	Takafumi Mizuguchi	Tetsuhiro Nabeshima	3
Kōshite Kare wa Okujō wo Moyasu Koto ni Shita	Kamitsuki Rainy	Juu Ayakura	1
Kowareta Hitobito	Suginari Takaoka	Mofu	1
Kukuru Kuru	Hajime Ninomae	Megane Otomo	1
Kuroharu Makers	Izumo Sunagi	Kisa Touma	1
Kuzu to Tenshi no Second Life	Mukai Tenshin	Ukami	2
Kyūei Sentai Mizugies	Kou Maisaka	Kurogin	3

=== L ===
Title	Author	Illustrator	No. of volumes
Leviathan Sweetheart	Koroku Inumura	Kenji Akahoshi	4

=== M ===
Title	Author	Illustrator	No. of volumes
Mahō Tsukai no Meshi Tsukai	Boncho Kuga	Sakana	1
Majo wa Sekai ni Kowareru	Kimito Kogi	Soto	2
Make Heroine ga Oosugiru!	Takibi Akamori	Imigimuru	6
Maō ga Yachin wo Haratte Kurenai	Hiro Itou	Sakana	7
Marginal	Kanzaki Shiden	Kyo	6
Maou-ppoi no!	Gengorou Harada	nyanya	4
Medecin du Mage no Shinryō Kiroku	Shōtarō Teshirogi	Niritsu	3
Midas Touch: Naikakufu Chōjō Keizai Hanzai Taisakuka	Kenji Saitō	Shugasuku	1
Mikakunin Mirai Shōjo	Takuya Masumoto	Hitogome	1
Mimoza no Kokuhaku	Mei Hachimoku	Kukka	5
Mori no Majuu ni Hanataba wo	Kimito Kogi	Soto	1
Musakui Chūshutsu Renai Yuugi	Kei Mizuichi	Houju Kujo	1

=== N ===
Title	Author	Illustrator	No. of volumes
Nanoka no Kuigami	Kamitsuki Rainy	Nauribon	3
Natsu no Owari to Reset Kanojo	Yoshitaka Sakaida	Ryō Ueda	1
Natsu e no Tonneru, Sayonara no Deguchi	Mokune Hachi	Kukka	1
The Neighbor Plays the Piano Around Midnight	Boncho Kuga	Eiri Iwamoto	2
Neko ni wa Narenai Goshokugyō	Nanakusa Takebayashi	Choco Fuji	2
Nidome no Natsu, Nidoto Aenai Kimi	Hirotaka Akagi	Booota	1
Nonomeme, Heartbreak	Eiichi Konomura	Ryutetsu	3

=== O ===
Title	Author	Illustrator	No. of volumes
Of The Dead Maniax	Renji Ooki	Saitom	1
Ōkami Kakushi	Ryō Masaki, Ryukishi07	Eri Natsume	3
Ore ga Ikiru Raison d'être	Kakeya Akatsuki	Shirabi	6
Ore, Twintail ni Narimasu.	Yume Mizusawa	Ayumu Kasuga	11

=== P ===
Title	Author	Illustrator	No. of volumes
Pale Rider	Enami Mitsunori	Bancha Shibano	1
Parasite Girl Sana	Izumo Sunagi	Lunalia	5
Punishment	Enami Mitsunori	Hiroyuki Kaidō	1
Puppet Master	Washiti Saime	Manyako	1

=== R ===
Title	Author	Illustrator	No. of volumes
Rakuen Tsuihō	Shōtarō Teshirogi	Masatsugu Saitō	1
RideBack: Cannonball Run	Boncho Kuga	Tetsurō Kasahara	1
RIGHT×LIGHT	Tsukasa	Konoe Ototsugu	12
RIGHT∞LIGHT	Tsukasa	Konoe Ototsugu	4
RWBY the Session	Kyosuke Izuki	Suzuhito Yasuda	1

=== S ===
Title	Author	Illustrator	No. of volumes
Sabishigariya no Loliferatu	Sō Sagara	Kohaku Kuroboshi	1
Saijaku no Shihaisha, toka.	Yū Takeuchi	Kagayo Akeboshi	1
Saikaishoku kara Saikyō made Nariagaru: Jimichi na Doryoku wa Cheat deshita	Kei Kamitani	Rein Kuwashima	1
Saitama Ken Shinjū Keifu	Tomonori Nakamura	Shimano	1
Saredo Tsumibito wa Ryū to Odoru: Dances with the Dragons	Asai Labo	Miyagi (1–13), Zain (14–21)	21
Sasami-san@Ganbaranai	Akira	Hidari	11
Satsuriku no Matrix Edge	Hikaru Sakurai	Sumihei	3
School Jack = Gun Smoke	Kodama Sakashita	Eiri Iwamoto	1
Seiyū Unit Hajimemashita	Tasuku Fujihara	Nemunemu	1
Seventh Hole no Majo	Asaka Ikeda	Haruaki Fuyuno	3
Sex Battle Royal	Kurono Shirato	Saki Hina	1
Shakunetsu no Kobayakawa-san	Romeo Tanaka	Nishimura	1
Shichisei no Subaru	Noritake Tao	Booota	5
Shikai Ryūō to Kyokutō no Avalon	Tsukasa	Yūnagi	4
Shimoneta to Iu Gainen ga Sonzai Shinai Taikutsu na Sekai	Hirotaka Akagi	Eito Shimotsuki	11 + 1 side story
Shinki Shōjo wa Koi wo Suru ka?	Fuminori Teshima	Buta Tetsu	2
Shinkōshūkyō Omoide-kyō Gaiden	Woodal Harada	Santa Tsuji	3
Sora Shiranu Niji no Kaihōku	Hideaki	Ryuuichi Ayaka	2
Sore Oreno	Shin Kitagawa	KENT	2
Sono Hi Kare ha Shinazu ni Sumu ka?	Kimito Kogi	Ryo Ueda	1
Steamheaven's Freaks	Kyōsuke Izaki	Kai	3
Strange Voice	Enami Mitsunori	Riku	1
Strike Fall	Satoshi Hase	Masahiro Tsukuba	2
Sumaga	Renji Ōki	Santa Tsuji	3
Super Robot-ko Tetsujin 23-gou	Kou Maisaka	Gorobots	1

=== T ===
Title	Author	Illustrator	No. of volumes
Tasogare Sekai no Zettai Tōsō	Motooka Tousei	Yuugen	2
Tengen Toppa Gurren Lagann	Kurasumi Sunayama	Hiroki Shinagawa	4
Tenmō Enjō Kagutsuchi	Izumo Sunagi	Artumph	3
Toaru Hikūshi e no Koiuta	Koroku Inumura	Haruyuki Morisawa	5
Toaru Hikūshi e no Seiyaku	Koroku Inumura	Haruyuki Morisawa	9
Toaru Hikūshi e no Tsuioku	Koroku Inumura	Haruyuki Morisawa	1
Toaru Hikūshi e no Yasōkyoku	Koroku Inumura	Haruyuki Morisawa	2
Tobenai Chō to Sora no Shachi: Ao no Kanata Yori Saihate he	Fuminori Teshima	Saki Ukai	3
Tobenai Chō to Sora no Shachi: Tayutau Shima no Yūbinbako	Fuminori Teshima	Saki Ukai	3

=== V ===
Title	Author	Illustrator	No. of volumes
Vorpal Bunny	Enami Mitsunori	Nakahara	2

=== W ===
Title	Author	Illustrator	No. of volumes
Waga Hero no Tame no Zettai Aku	Takashi Ōizumi	Oguchi	3
World's End Girl Friend	Kou Arakawa	Jun Kumaori	1

=== Y ===
Title	Author	Illustrator	No. of volumes
Yagate Koisuru Vivi Lane	Koroku Inumura	Minako Iwasaki	3
Yahari Ore no Seishun Rabu Kome wa Machigatteiru	Wataru Watari	Ponkan8	14 + 4 side stories
Yamashii Game no Tsukurikata	Kou Arakawa	nauribon	2
Yu-Shiki	Hajime Ninomae	Wakaba	1
Yūsha ni Kitai Shita Boku ga Baka deshita	Kazushi Hama	Ixy	3
Yūsha to Yūsha to Yūsha to Yūsha	Ougyo Kawashigi	Shungo Sumaki	5
Yūutsu na Villains	Kamitsuki Rainy	Daisuke Kimura	5

=== Z ===
Title	Author	Illustrator	No. of volumes
Zaito BxB	Hisa Ootani	pun2	1
Zettai Karen Children the Novels "B.A.B.E.L. Hōkai"	Gakuto Mikumo	Takashi Shiina	1
