= Susuwatari =

Fictional Japanese spirits from Studio Ghibli films

- Multiple Susuwatari in Spirited Away
- First appearance: My Neighbor Totoro; 1988
- Last appearance: Zen – Grogu and Dust Bunnies; 2022
- Created by: Hayao Miyazaki

Susuwatari (Japanese: ススワタリ, 煤渡り; "wandering soot"), also called Makkuro kurosuke (まっくろくろすけ; "makkuro" meaning "pitch black", "kuro" meaning "black" and "-suke" being a common ending for male names), is the name of a fictitious sprite that was devised by Hayao Miyazaki and Studio Ghibli, known from the famous anime-productions My Neighbor Totoro (1988) and Spirited Away (2001) where, in the former, they are identified as "black soots" in early subtitles, as "soot sprites" or "dust bunnies" in the Streamline Pictures English dub, and as "soot gremlins" in the Walt Disney Studios English dubbed version.

In the RSC's stage version of My Neighbour Totoro, they are called "soot sprites" and there is a solo sprite named Geoff.

== Description ==
Susuwatari are described and shown as golf ball-sized, pitch-black and fuzzy-haired beings with two large eyes and long, thin limbs. They move by hovering around, but they can extend stick-like limbs from their bodies to do certain tasks, and can lift objects many times their own weight. They make a squeaky murmuring sound when excited, and dissolve into powder (soot) if crushed.

== Depictions in Studio Ghibli films ==
=== My Neighbor Totoro (1988) ===
In My Neighbor Totoro, the house the main characters move into is full of Susuwatari, which are rationalized as Makkuro Kurosuke, an optical illusion caused by moving quickly from light into darkness. Seeing that the family consists of good people, the Susuwatari leave the house to move to another abandoned area.

=== Spirited Away (2001) ===
They later reappeared in Spirited Away as workers in Kamaji's boiler room.

The protagonist Sen (Chihiro) befriends a number of them by helping them carry coal. Sen is told that if these Susuwatari are not given a job to do, they turn back into soot. Another character, Lin, feeds the Susuwatari much like farmers feed chickens, throwing handfuls of the Japanese candy konpeitō onto the ground for them to eat. After Sen is accepted among the staff of the bathhouse, chiefly by Kamaji and Lin, the Susuwatari become almost admiring of her, and help her in their small ways.

=== "Zen – Grogu and Dust Bunnies" (2022) ===
In 2022, Studio Ghibli and Lucasfilm collaborated on a Star Wars short for Disney+ where The Mandalorian character Grogu interacts with a band of dust bunnies that give him a flower as a gift.

== See also ==
- Dust bunny
