= The Princess and the Pilot =

Japanese light novel and anime film

- Light novel volume cover

とある飛空士への追憶 (To Aru Hikūshi e no Tsuioku)
- Genre: Action; Military; Romance
- Light novel
- Written by: Koroku Inumura
- Illustrated by: Haruyuki Morisawa
- Published by: Shogakukan
- Imprint: Gagaga Bunko
- Published: February 19, 2008
- Manga
- Written by: Koroku Inumura
- Illustrated by: Maiko Ogawa
- Published by: Shogakukan
- Imprint: Monthly Shōnen Sunday Comics
- Magazine: Monthly Shōnen Sunday
- Original run: August 12, 2009 – March 12, 2011
- Volumes: 4
- Anime film
- Directed by: Jun Shishido
- Produced by: Hideaki Miyamoto; Ryouhei Takahashi
- Written by: Satoko Okudera
- Music by: Shirō Hamaguchi
- Studio: Madhouse (animation); TMS Entertainment (production)
- Licensed by: NA: Discotek Media; UK: Manga UK
- Released: October 1, 2011
- Runtime: 100 minutes
- icon

The Princess and the Pilot (Japanese: とある飛空士への追憶, Hepburn: To Aru Hikūshi e no Tsuioku; "Recollections for a Certain Pilot") is a Japanese light novel written by Koroku Inumura and illustrated by Haruyuki Morisawa. It was published by Shogakukan under its Gagaga Bunko imprint in February 2008. A manga adaptation by Maiko Ogawa was serialized in Shogakukan's shōnen manga magazine Monthly Shōnen Sunday from August 2009 to February 2011, with its chapters collected in four tankōbon volumes. An anime film adaptation, a joint production by Madhouse and TMS Entertainment, directed by Jun Shishido, premiered in October 2011.

== Plot ==
Charles Karino (狩乃 シャルル, Karino Sharuru) (voiced by Ryunosuke Kamiki), a mercenary aerial pilot of mixed Amatsuvian-Levammian heritage, serves as the Levamme Kingdom's most skilled aviator yet endures persistent racial discrimination from regular military forces. Despite consistently outperforming elite pilots in combat exercises, his mixed ancestry prevents official recognition as a flying ace. His life changes dramatically when assigned to pilot the reconnaissance seaplane Santa Cruz on a covert mission to transport Princess Juana del Moral (ファナ・デル・モラル, Fana deru Moraru) (voiced by Seika Taketomi), a silver-haired royal known for her uncommon compassion and progressive views.

The mission follows the destruction of Juana's family estate by Amatsuvian forces, which claims her father's life and endangers her own safety as the crown prince's betrothed. While other mercenary units create diversions, Charles must navigate 12,000 kilometers of enemy territory to deliver the princess to Levamme's capital. During the journey, he discovers enemy forces have deciphered Levamme's military communications, compromising both primary and diversionary operations.

The shared ordeal fosters mutual understanding between the two protagonists. Juana demonstrates genuine respect for Charles's skills and heritage, while Charles comes to admire her strength and compassion. Their developing bond proves crucial as they evade relentless enemy attacks across their transcontinental flight. The mission's success comes at personal cost - Charles ultimately rejects his substantial payment and disappears aboard his aircraft, his fate left uncertain.

Years later, Juana ascends as Levamme's queen and establishes lasting peace between the warring nations. Historical accounts suggest the full significance of her transformative journey with Charles only became apparent in later years, with some sources hinting at a possible childhood connection between the two that neither fully recognized during their fateful mission.

== Media ==
=== Light novel ===
Written by Koroku Inumura, with illustrations by Haruyuki Morisawa, the light novel The Princess and the Pilot was published by Shogakukan under its Gagaga Bunko imprint on February 19, 2008.

=== Manga ===
A manga adaptation, illustrated by Maiko Ogawa, was serialized in Shogakukan's Monthly Shōnen Sunday from August 12, 2009, to February 12, 2011. Shogakukan compiled its chapters into four tankōbon volumes, released from January 12, 2010, to September 12, 2011.

=== Anime film ===
An anime film adaptation, a joint production by Madhouse and TMS Entertainment, and directed by Jun Shishido, premiered on October 1, 2011.

== See also ==
- The Pilot's Love Song, a light novel series set in the same universe
