= Shogakukan =

Japanese publishing company

Shogakukan Inc.

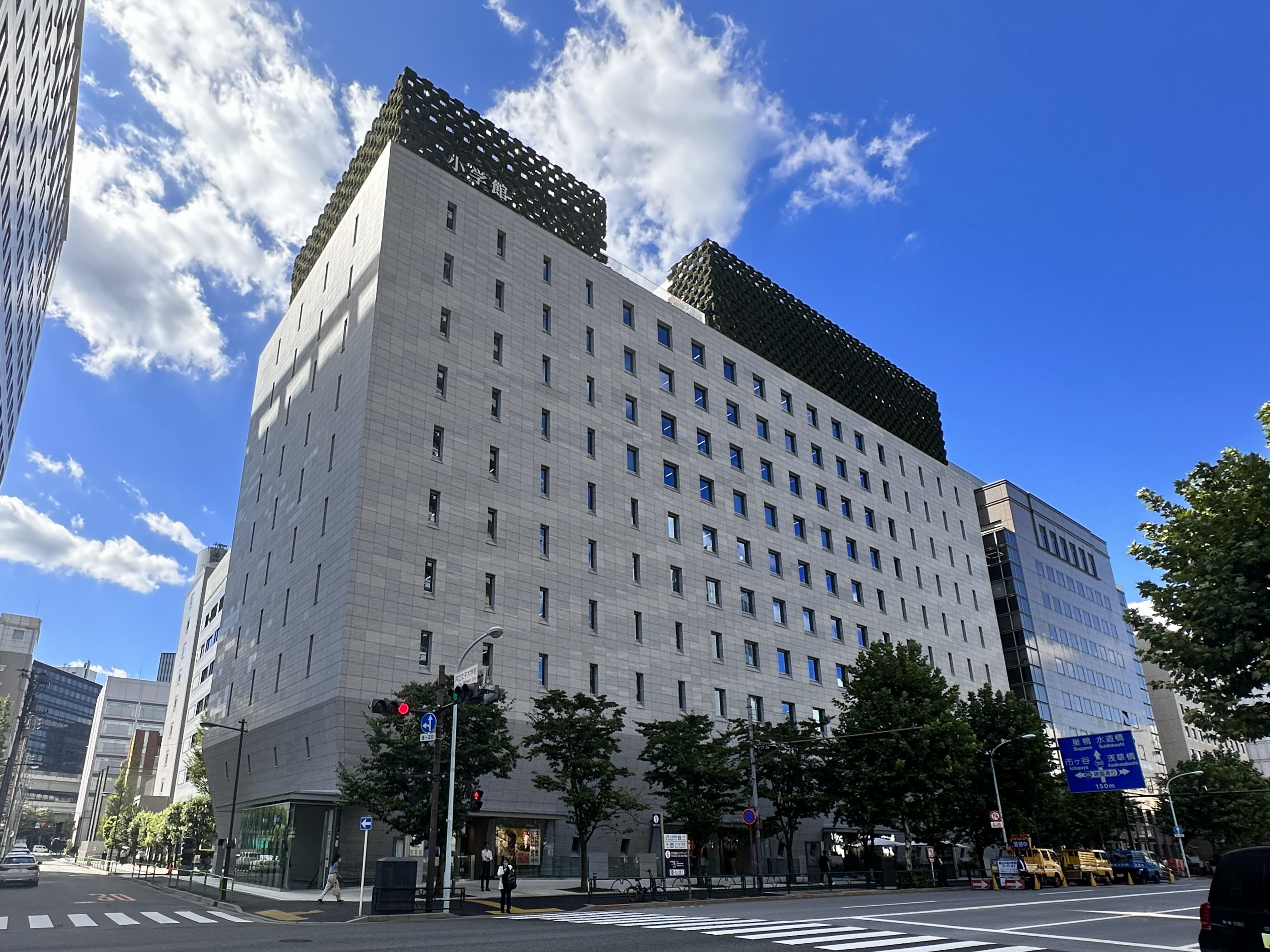
- Headquarters in Chiyoda, Tokyo, Japan
- Native name: 株式会社小学館
- Romanized name: Kabushiki-gaisha Shōgakukan
- Type: Private
- Industry: Publishing
- Founded: August 8, 1922; 104 years ago
- Founder: Takeo Ōga
- Headquarters: Kanda, Chiyoda, Tokyo, Japan
- Area served: Worldwide
- Key people: Nobuhiro Oga (president and CEO)
- Products: Magazines, comics, picture books, light novels, educational books, reference books, other books
- Revenue: 108,471,000,000 yen (2023)
- Owner: Hitotsubashi Group (Ōga family)
- Number of employees: 707 (2024)
- Subsidiaries: Shogakukan Publishing Service; Shorinsha; Shogakukan Creative; NetAdvance; Viz Media
- Website: www.shogakukan.co.jp

Shogakukan Inc. (Japanese: 株式会社小学館, Hepburn: Kabushiki-gaisha Shōgakukan; often pronounced as Shōgakkan due to devoicing) is a Japanese publisher of comics, magazines, light novels, dictionaries, literature, non-fiction, home media, and other media in Japan.

Shogakukan founded Shueisha, which also founded Hakusensha. These are three separate companies, but are together called the Hitotsubashi Group, one of the largest publishing groups in Japan and the world. Shogakukan is headquartered in the Shogakukan Building in Hitotsubashi, part of Kanda, Chiyoda, Tokyo, near the Jimbocho book district. The corporation also has the other two companies located in the same ward.

== International operations ==
=== In the United States ===
Shogakukan, along with Shueisha, owns Viz Media, which publishes manga from both companies in the United States.

Shogakukan's licensing arm in North America was ShoPro Entertainment; it was merged into Viz Media in 2005.

Shogakukan's production arm is Shogakukan-Shueisha Productions (previously Shogakukan Productions Co., Ltd.)

In March 2010 it was announced that Shogakukan would partner with the American comics publisher Fantagraphics to issue a line of manga to be edited by Rachel Thorn.

=== In Europe ===
In Europe, manga from Shōgakukan and Shūeisha are published by local publishers such as Pika Édition, Ki-oon, Kana and Kazé for the French market, and Kazé, Carlsen, Egmont and Tokyopop for the German market. Shogakukan, Shueisha and ShoPro have established a joint venture named Viz Media Europe. Viz Media Europe bought in 2009 the French Kazé Group whose activities are mainly publishing manga and home video for the French and German market.

=== In Southeast Asia ===
The company has a wholly owned subsidiary, Shogakukan Asia, with headquarter in Singapore. Besides producing popular titles in English such as Detective Conan, Pokémon and Future Card Buddyfight, the company also partners with local creators such as Johnny Lau to publish comic series for distribution in Southeast Asia.

== New Manga Awards ==
Shogakukan has awards for amateur manga artists who want to become professional. It allows people to either send in their manga by mail or bring it in to an editor.

== Controversies ==
=== Genghis Khan ===
On February 15, 2018, CoroCoro Comic ("Gekkan Corocoro Comic"), a children's magazine published by Shogakukan, had in its March issue a cartoon making fun of Genghis Khan, founder of the Mongol Empire. The comic showed a mischievous boy doodling juvenile things on pictures of famous people, such as a dog's face on a picture of Albert Einstein. Genghis Khan was depicted with a crude rendering of male genitalia on his forehead. After some backlash, Shogakukan initially offered an apology addressed to the Mongolian Embassy in Tokyo on February 23, but that failed to mollify Mongolian expats in Japan, who regard Genghis Khan as a national hero.

On February 26, Mongolians and citizens of China's Inner Mongolia autonomous region resident in Japan sent a formal letter of protest to Shogakukan, while some 90 demonstrators protested in front of company headquarters. Major bookselling chains Kinokuniya, Miraiya and Kumazawa pulled the publication off shelves after the Mongolian Embassy in Tokyo filed an official complaint with the Ministry of Foreign Affairs. In March 2018, Shogakukan issued another public apology, announced a national recall of the magazine and offered a refund to magazine patrons. CoroCoro Comic's website also published an apology by Asumi Yoshino, author of the serialized manga Yarisugi!!! Itazura-kun which contained the controversial image.

=== Shōichi Yamamoto ===
On February 20, 2026, a Sapporo District Court judge found Shōichi Yamamoto liable for sexually abusing a minor. According to Ashita no Keizai Shimbun, the victim was 15 years old and Yamamoto was her high school teacher when he intimately touched her and kissed her in a car. Ashita no Keizai Shimbun also reported that he raped her a year later; the lawsuit alleged that Yamamoto forced the victim to eat her own excrement and took pictures of her with "slave" written on her body as "punishment". The lawsuit was filed years earlier after a failed mediation attempt by Shogakukan. In 2020, Shogakukan suspended Yamamoto's series Daten Sakusen citing his "poor health", before they announced that the manga was ending publication in 2022. Later that same year, editors at Shogakukan conspired to have Yamamoto write Jojin Kamen under the pen name "Hajime Ichiro". In 2026, when the civil trial publicly disclosed the verdict, MangaONE, the platform where Yamamoto's works were published, released a public statement that they would be suspending Jojin Kamen, wherein they also revealed that the author was Yamamoto. Shogakukan also released a separate statement, which apologized for the affair and promised an investigative committee to look into the incident would be formed.

Eri Tsuruyoshi, the illustrator of Jojin Kamen, posted on social media that they did not know about Yamamoto's legal case and had only met him once, with all communication coming through their editor. They also expressed hope that the victim would recover and apologized to readers. In response to the controversy, several manga artists asked for their works to be removed from MangaONE and for readers to read their works on other platforms. The Japan Cartoonists Association called for an investigation and steps be taken to prevent this situation from happening again. Ryuhei Tamura (Cosmos), Haro Aso (Zom 100: Bucket List of the Dead), Kaeru Mizuho (Magical Girl Dandelion), and Minoru Takeyoshi (Shokubutsu Byōrigaku wa Asu no Kimi o Negau) asked that their respective series' publication on MangaONE be halted. One-Punch Man creator One stated that he would not work with Shogakukan again if the matter is not resolved. Frieren, Mobile Police Patlabor, Major, Mogura no Uta, Aoi Honō, Moeyo Pen, and works by Rumiko Takahashi were removed from the MangaONE service. The award ceremony for the 71st Shogakukan Manga Award, which was originally scheduled to be held on March 3, was postponed.

On March 2, 2026, Shogakukan discovered that MangaONE published Seisō no Shinri-shi, a manga written by Act-Age writer Tatsuya Matsuki under the pen name "Miki Yatsunami", who had been arrested and indicted on the charge of committing a coerced indecent act on a female middle school student in 2020.

== List of magazines published ==
=== Manga magazines ===
==== Male oriented manga magazines ====
Children's manga magazines

- CoroCoro Comic (since 1977)
- Bessatsu CoroCoro Comic (since 1981)
- CoroCoro Ichiban! (since 2005)

Shōnen manga magazines

- Weekly Shōnen Sunday (since 1959)
- Shōnen Sunday Super (since 1978)
- Shōnen Big Comic (1979–1987, discontinued)
- Monthly Shōnen Sunday (since 2009)
- Bessatsu Shōnen Sunday (別冊少年) (1960–1974)

Seinen manga magazines

- Big Comic (since 1968)
  - Big Comic Business
  - Big Comic Original (since 1972)
  - Big Comic Spirits (since 1980)
  - Monthly Big Comic Spirits (since 2009)
  - Big Comic Special
  - Big Comic Superior (since 1987)
- Monthly Ikki (2003–2014, discontinued)
- Monthly Sunday Gene-X (since 2000)
- Weekly Young Sunday (1987–2008, discontinued)

==== Female oriented manga magazines ====
Children's manga magazines

- Pucchigumi (ぷっちぐみ) (since 2006)

Shōjo manga magazines

- Betsucomi (since 1970)
- Cheese! (since 1996)
- ChuChu (2000–2010, discontinued)
- Ciao (since 1977)
- Pochette
- Shōjo Comic (since 1968), called Sho-Comi since December 2007

Josei manga magazines

- Flowers (since 2002)
- Judy
- Petit Comic (since 1977)
- Rinka (2007–discontinued)

=== Fashion magazines ===
- CanCam (since 1981)

=== Educational magazines ===
- Shogaku Ichinensei (First Grade)
- Shogaku Ninensei (Second Grade) (discontinued in 2016)
- Shogaku Sannensei (Third Grade) (discontinued in 2012)
- Shogaku Yonnensei (Fourth Grade) (discontinued in 2012)
- Shogaku Gonensei (Fifth Grade) (discontinued in 2010)
- Shogaku Rokunensei (Sixth Grade) (discontinued in 2010)
- Shogaku Hachinensei (Eighth Grade) (since 2017, replacing Second to Sixth Grade magazines)

=== News magazines ===
- Weekly Post (週刊ポスト)
- SAPIO (discontinued in 2019)
- Josei Seven (女性セブン)

=== Anime ===
Shogakukan produces (or makes part of the production of) anime based on their manga, mostly through their subsidiary Shogakukan-Shueisha Productions.

== Imprints ==
=== Tentomushi Comics ===
Tentōmusi Comics (Japanese: てんとう虫コミックス【てんとうむしコミックス】, Hepburn: Tentōmushi Komikkusu), abbreviated TC, is the imprint used for tankōbon editions of manga series serialized in Monthly CoroCoro Comic and Bessatsu CoroCoro Comic magazines.

== See also ==
- Gagaga Bunko, one of the Light Novel Imprints by Shogakukan
- Jinbōchō Theater, owned and operated by Shogakukan
- List of manga published by Shogakukan
- List of works published by Shogakukan
