= List of Aria the Scarlet Ammo episodes =

Aria the Scarlet Ammo is an anime television series produced by J.C.Staff, based on the light novel series written by Chūgaku Akamatsu and illustrated by Kobuichi. Set in a world where high school students known as Butei are equipped with firearms and assist in solving cases, a Butei named Kinji Tōyama has a chance encounter with Aria H. Kanzaki, a descendant of Sherlock Holmes. The series, directed by Takashi Watanabe and produced by J.C.Staff, aired in Japan between April 15 and July 1, 2011. The opening theme is "Scarlet Ballet" by May'n and the ending theme is "Camellia no Hitomi" (カメリアの瞳, Kameria no Hitomi) by Aiko Nakano. An original video animation (OVA) episode was released on December 21, 2011. The anime is licensed in North America by Funimation, in Australia by Madman Entertainment, and in the United Kingdom by Manga Entertainment. The anime made its North American television debut on the Funimation Channel on November 27, 2012.

An anime adaptation of Aria the Scarlet Ammo AA, a spin-off manga series written by Shogako Tachibana, has been produced by Doga Kobo aired in Japan between October 6 and December 22, 2015. The series follows an E-ranked Butei named Akari Mamiya, who aims to become Aria's "Amica" and fight alongside her. The opening theme is "Bull's Eye" by Nano while the ending theme is "Pulse" (パルス, Parusu) by Ayane Sakura and Rie Kugimiya. The series is also licensed in North America by Funimation, who simulcast it as it aired.

== Episode list ==
=== Aria the Scarlet Ammo (2011) ===
| No. | Title | Original air date |
|---|---|---|
| 1 | "The Girl"; Transliteration: "La Bambina" | April 15, 2011 |
Kinji Tōyama is a student at Tokyo Butei High school, where agents known as Butei are trained to become crime fighting detectives/mercenaries. Having missed his bus, Kinji rides his bike to school when to his surprise he is chased by a remote-controlled Segway armed with an Uzi, which informs him that a bomb has been attached to his bike which will explode if he slows down (a nod to the movie Speed), and also threatens to shoot him if he jumps off. Kinji is saved by a mysterious pony-tailed girl named Aria Holmes Kanzaki. The two end up pinned down in a gym storage locker as more Segways appear, Aria fends them off, inadvertently sticking her chest right in Kinji's face. As a result Kinji enters Hysteria Mode and he is able to destroy the Segways as well as counter Aria's outraged attacks almost effortlessly. When Kinji finally arrives at school, he learns that Aria has transferred into his class. Later that day, Aria arrives at Kinji's apartment with her baggage and declares him to be her slave.
| 2 | "Aria the Quadra"; Transliteration: "Kadora no Aria" (Japanese: 双剣双銃のアリア) | April 22, 2011 |
Aria demands that Kinji join her Butei party, intruding into his apartment when he refuses. This puts Kinji in an awkward situation when his childhood friend, Shirayuki Hotogi, arrives while Aria is taking a bath. The next day, Aria follows Kinji around as he takes on a job searching for a missing cat. After managing to lose Aria, Kinji trades some eroge with his friend, Riko Mine, to obtain information on Aria. Meanwhile, Aria calls Kinji's bluff on his Butei abilities and coerces him to agree to join her on a single Assault case, so she can witness his Hysteria Mode.
| 3 | "First Mission"; Transliteration: "Fāsuto Misshon" (Japanese: ファースト・ミッション) | April 29, 2011 |
Aria follows Kinji to the arcade where he manages to win some plush dolls for her. The next day, Kinji and Aria learn that a bus full of Butei students has been hijacked by the Butei Killer and fitted with a bomb that will explode if it slows down and an armed convertible is preventing the passengers from interfering. After the bus driver is injured when an attempt to stop the convertible is foiled by heat-detection, Kinji and Aria arrive on the scene, taking out the convertible. With the bus running out of gas, Aria finds the bomb on the underside of the bus while Kinji finds and destroys the communications sensor. The bomb is disarmed by the sniper ace, Reki, but Aria is injured by another armed vehicle while trying to protect Kinji. As she is treated in the hospital, she feels disappointed that Kinji did not meet her expectations.
| 4 | "Butei Killer"; Transliteration: "Butei Goroshi" (Japanese: 武偵殺し) | May 6, 2011 |
Kinji follows Aria who goes to the police station to talk with her mother, who has been framed as the Butei Killer, in addition to other crimes, and sentenced to 864 years despite the attacks that have occurred since her incarceration. If Aria is able to prove that she is not the Butei Killer, the sentence would be reduced to only 742 years. Aria's mother tells her that she needs to find a partner to use her abilities to the fullest. The next day, Kinji hears word from Ryou Shiranui that Aria will be flying back to London. Kinji meets Riko, who reveals information concerning the Butei Killer, and also mentions his brother who died during a boat hijacking, before pulling some moves which sends Kinji into his Hysteria Mode. With his heightened senses, Kinji deduces that Aria's plane is being targeted by the Butei Killer, and manages to get on it just before it takes off. During the flight, Kinji learns that Aria has a fear of lightning shortly before the Butei Killer announces his hijacking. They discover the culprit who organized the bike and bus hijackings is Riko, the great-granddaughter of Arsene Lupin, and that she is targeting Aria so she can surpass her great-grandfather. She also reveals herself to be the one who killed Kinji's brother, who was also her lover. Riko and Aria enter an intense duel, but Riko gains the upper hand by using the fact that she is a Quadra as well by manipulating her hair to use a knife to attack Aria at the same time as using her guns to shoot her.
| 5 | "Butei Charter, Article 1"; Transliteration: "Butei Kenshō Ichijō" (Japanese: 武偵憲章１条) | May 13, 2011 |
Kinji works quickly and uses a first-aid kit to save Aria's life. When Aria yells at him as a result, Kinji kisses her to simultaneously calm her down and activate his Hysteria mode, confronting Riko as she approaches. As the plane starts descending, Aria rushes to the controls while Kinji confronts Riko, who escapes by blowing out a hatch and parachuting out just before the plane is hit by missiles, blowing out two of its engines and causing a fuel leak. Despite interference by the government, Kinji manages to ease the plane into an emergency landing, thanks to Goki Muto. Afterwards, as Aria prepares to leave, Kinji agrees to be her partner, though this does not sit well with Shirayuki.
| 6 | "Stairway to Heaven"; Transliteration: "Tengoku he No Kaidan" (Japanese: 天国への階段) | May 20, 2011 |
Aria happens to be the great-granddaughter of Sherlock Holmes, much to Kinji's surprise. As she conflicts with Aria over Kinji, Shirayuki is revealed to be a Chōtei, a special type of Butei with supernatural abilities. The next day, Aria decides to start a new training regime to try to get Kinji to control his Hysteria Mode. Later, Aria drags Kinji along as she eavesdrops on Shirayuki as she is taken to a teacher's office, where they hear about a Chōtei kidnapper named Durandal who may be targeting her. Believing Durandal to be one of the culprits who framed her mother, Aria offers to be Shirayuki's bodyguard, which she agrees to on the condition that Kinji is involved as well, and she moves into his apartment in the process. Shirayuki later hears what she believes to be Kinji calling for help from her cellphone and rushes into the bathroom. To her dismay she discovers Kinji in the bath and that the call was fake. She begins to strip as punishment for seeing Kinji in his underwear. Aria walks in and, misunderstanding the situation, pulls her guns and chases Kinji out the window and into the river.
| 7 | "Caged Bird"; Transliteration: "Kago no Tori" (Japanese: かごのとり) | May 27, 2011 |
Recovering from the cold he developed from his plunge into the river, Kinji continues to be trained by Aria in case they encounter Durandal. The two of them have a public falling out, as Kinji believes that Aria has lied about Durandal’s existence. Shirayuki tells Kinji how the Hotogi are restricted from venturing out of the shrine but she wants to see the firework festival. Later Kinji suggests that the two of them should go to the fireworks festival, to which Shirayuki agrees even though she is breaking the rules of the shrine. Later that night, Shirayuki receives a text message which she keeps to herself. The following day at school, Shirayuki suddenly disappears but with Reki's assistance, Kinji is able to locate her in the basement of a warehouse. While hiding, Kinji discovers Shirayuki negotiating with the hidden Durandal in order to protect the school. It is revealed that the text message from the previous evening and fake call for help in the apartment were both from Durandal. Kinji jumps in to rescue Skirayuki but is quickly pinned down by Durandal.
| 8 | "Durandal"; Transliteration: "Durandaru" (Japanese: 魔剣(デュランダル)) | June 3, 2011 |
Aria arrives to assist Kinji and they find her chained onto a pipe as the warehouse begins to flood. Because Aria cannot swim, Kinji advises Aria to pursue Durandal while he tries to free Shirayuki. As the water begins to cover her head, Kinji kisses Shirayuki to enter Hysteria Mode and is able to free her. The two of them are forced onto an upper floor by the flood and become separated. Kinji and Aria meet up and find Shirayuki, but Kinji realizes that it is Durandal in disguise. After freezing Aria’s hands, Durandal reveals herself to be Jeanne d'Arc and wants Aria to join her organization, but she is distracted by the arrival of the real Shirayuki. Jeanne momentarily escapes as Shirayuki heals Aria’s hands. In the distance, Jeanne begins to freeze the room and show her true appearance. Having no choice but to fight, Shirayuki reveals the extent of her Hotogi powers. Kinji is able to assist Shirayuki in the fight allowing her to destroy Durandal's sword and successfully arrest her. Later, Shirayuki tells Aria that she kissed Kinji and yet another conflict emerges, whereby Kinji escapes by jumping into the river again.
| 9 | "Honey Trap"; Transliteration: "Hanii Torappu" (Japanese: 蜂蜜色の罠(ハニートラップ)) | June 10, 2011 |
Kinji is called by "Aria" to her room where she tries to subdue him, but he realizes that he is facing Riko in disguise. Riko then attempts to induce Hysteria Mode, but Aria interrupts by smashing through the window. After throwing insults at each others, Aria and Riko fight which leads them to the roof. Kinji stops the fight and Aria demands that Riko testify for her mother, which, oddly enough, Riko accepts. It is explained that Vlad the Bad expelled Riko from the secret organization for not defeating Aria and stole something from her as punishment. Riko engages Kinji and Aria into helping her retrieve the stolen memento in exchange for her testimony. Riko returns to school the next day and teases Kinji the entire time. Later, Shirayuki attacks Riko out of jealous, but Riko avoids the attack and leaves Shirayuki with Kinji. Faking an injury, Shirayuki leads Kinji to the empty nurse’s office where she informs him that she has to stay at the shrine for a month for breaking the rules during the fireworks festival. She then unsuccessfully tries to seduce him but he escapes through the window. The following day, Kinji and Aria meet up with Riko.
| 10 | "Special Training"; Transliteration: "Tokkun" (Japanese: 特訓) | June 17, 2011 |
The item that Vlad took from Riko is a rosary that was given to her by her deceased mother. The plan is to infiltrate Vlad’s mansion disguised as butler and maid. The next day, Riko asks Kinji to meet her at the infirmary. On his way, he was surprised by Jeanne who, as part of her plea bargain, is now enrolled at the school. Jeanne reveals how Vlad, claiming to be Riko’s relative, took her in when Riko’s parents died. Jeanne also reveals that Vlad is not human and poses a great threat. With a poor drawing, she details three of four marks on Vlad’s body that must be destroyed in order to defeat him. Kinji arrives at the infirmary and discovers to his dismay that Aria, Riko, and a number of other girls are scheduled for a physical examination. In a panic, he hides inside a closet. His presence is revealed by Reki just before a large white wolf charges through the window. Kinji and Reki pursue it after it flees. Reki intentionally grazes the wolf with her shot, paralyzing it and, in remarkably short order, making it her pet.
| 11 | "Infiltration"; Transliteration: "Sennyū" (Japanese: 潜入) | July 1, 2011 |
Aria continues her training as a maid with Riko. Later, Kinji and Aria meet up with Riko who has disguised herself as an agent of an employment agency and leads the two to the mansion. To their surprise, they find that the mansion is under the care of their teacher, Tōru Sayonaki. Over the course of the following two weeks, the two of them discover the rosary's location as well as the details of the security system that guards it. After discussing options with Riko, they execute their plan. Aria is able to distract Sayonaki long enough for Kinji to retrieve the rosary and replace it with a fake. After Kinji gives Riko her rosary she turns against them.
| 12 | "Vlad"; Transliteration: "Burado" (Japanese: ブラド) | July 1, 2011 |
Continuing from the previous episode, Riko declares that, in order to surpass her ancestors, she has to defeat Kinji and Aria. However, Riko is suddenly tased by Sayonaki, who has somehow tracked them down. He reveals that Sayonaki is a cover identity for Vlad who has been performing genetic research on humans for a long time and harvested genes to eliminate his natural weaknesses. Sayonaki then transforms into an ogre vampire beast, stating that Vlad is summoned by the sound of despair. Kinji and Aria fire their guns at Vlad but find that their bullets are ineffective. Kinji saves Riko from Vlad’s grip as Aria tries to break the marks on Vlad’s body. Riko believes that the fourth mark is located on his chest, although this proves not to be the case. Vlad neutralizes Kinji's Hysteria Mode and knocks him over the edge of the roof, but Riko saves him with her parachute and returns to the roof to save Aria. Riko uses Aria to help Kinji reactivate the Hysteria Mode in order for him to devise a plan of attack. Kinji then figures out that the fourth mark is on Vlad's tongue, and the three of them successfully kill Vlad with their four remaining bullets. Kinji then helps Riko come to the understanding that, by defeating Vlad, she has surpassed her ancestor. Afterwards, Riko testifies on Kanae Kanzaki's behalf.
| OVA | "Butei's Going on a Hot Spring Training Camp"; Transliteration: "Butei ga Kitarite Onsen Kensyū" (Japanese: 武偵が着たりて温泉研修) | December 21, 2011 |
Buteir High teacher Umeko Tsuzuri takes Kinji, Aria, Shirayuki, Riko, Reki, Jeanne, and Muto to a secluded mountain onsen run by a former Butei for special training. During their long hike to the lodge, Aria, Shirayuki, and Riko fight over Kinji. While in the hot springs, the girls compare their chest sizes, much to Aria's dismay. Aria and Jeanne later have a ping-pong match using their special abilities. Later, Muto is frightened upon seeing Jeanne temporarily turned into a chrysanthemum statue. She admits to losing memory between leaving the game room and ending up outside. Muto disappears that night, and the others later find him dead. Shirayuki then notices Tsuzuri and the landlady have been hanged. The group then spots a mysterious young boy and chases after him inside a haunted room. All of a sudden, the students find themselves back inside the minivan just before they arrive the inn. While each member of the group remembers what happened up to their individual 'deaths', the landlady and everyone else not in the group do not recall anything and think the group are acting really strangely. Yet, the knowledge that the group learned from their mutual experience, such as events from the landlady's past, seems to be true. What exactly happened to the group remains a mystery.

=== Aria the Scarlet Ammo AA (2015) ===
| No. | Title | Original release date |
|---|---|---|
| 1 | "Another A"; Transliteration: "Mō Hitori no Ē" (Japanese: もう一人のA) | October 6, 2015 |
Akari Mamiya is a first-year student at Tokyo Butei High School with a strong admiration for Aria, though she is the lowest-ranked in class and is ranked E-class. Despite how large the odds are stacked against her, Akari applies to become Aria's "Amica", an underclassman who receives training from an upperclassman. Deciding to give her a chance, Aria tasks Akari with retrieving her pistol from her within an hour. During this period, Aria is called into a terrorist situation on a bridge, during which Akari risks herself to protect Aria from an oncoming car. In the final moments of the test, Akari momentarily retrieves her pistol, only to have it snatched back in the end. Admiring her efforts, Aria decides to make Akari her Amica candidate, stating she can only become a true Amica once she properly retrieves her pistol from her while secretly becoming curious about the fighting techniques she used.
| 2 | "Dangerous Relationship"; Transliteration: "Kiken na Kankei" (Japanese: 危険な関係) | October 13, 2015 |
As their Amica relationship begins, Akari questions whether or not she can be of any use to Aria, though Aria notices her talent for sewing parachutes. Meanwhile, Shino Sasaki, Akari's friend who secretly harbors an obsessive crush on her, becomes jealous of all the time she is spending with Aria. Finding a loophole in the Amica agreement which states that a partnership will be nullified if the Amica is defeated by someone within three days, Shino brings Akari to her house, leaving her unarmed for challenging her with her swords. Through determination, however, Akari manages to disarm both of Shino's swords and lasts long enough to get past the 3-day period. The next day, Shino learns that fellow Amicas are allowed to train together and decides to become someone else's Amica in order to study alongside her.
| 3 | "Applying to be an Amica"; Transliteration: "Amika Shigan" (Japanese: 戦妹志願) | October 20, 2015 |
Akari's tomboyish friend, Raika Hino, joins Akari and Shino in training under Aria, unaware that she is being stalked by a girl named Kirin Shima. Later, Akari becomes irritated when she sees Aria together with Kinji, becoming angered when he views Aria as more of an annoyance. After being told by Aria to be more conscious about her surroundings, Akari spots Kirin requesting to become Raika's Amica, before learning that Raika has been taking insults about her boyish behavior to heart. Later that day, Akari and Kirin follow Raika to a cosplay shop, where she indulges in her love of cute things that she can't show anyone else. Blackmailing Raika over her secret, Kirin challenges Raika to an Amica Chance match, taking advantage of her own cuteness skills to win, though it is later revealed that Raika lost on purpose as she wasn't against the idea of having an Amica. Meanwhile, Akari becomes curious as to why Riko seems to know her, while Aria continues to look deeper into Akari's background.
| 4 | "Quartet, Part 1"; Transliteration: "Karutetto Zenpen" (Japanese: カルテット 前編) | October 27, 2015 |
The first year students participate in the Quartet, a test for four-person teams, with Akari teaming up with Shino, Raika, and Kirin. Their first match is scheduled against Urara Takachiko, a rich girl who humiliated Akari in the past, whose team also includes Hina and twins Yuyu and Yaya Aizawa. The girls, along with Akari's younger sister Nonoka, spend the weekend at Shino's house to prepare themselves for the Quartet, with Riko giving them a training regime to work with. As the girls train, Shino explains how she was able to become Shirayuki's Amica while Kirin explains to Raika what made her desire to become her Amica. After Akari receives some additional late night training from Aria, the day of their Quartet match against Urara's team arrives.
| 5 | "Quartet, Part 2"; Transliteration: "Karutetto Kōhen" (Japanese: カルテット 後編) | November 3, 2015 |
The match begins, in which each team must try to touch the opponent's eye flag with one of their attack flags before their opponent. As Shino holds off the Aizawa twins, Raika and Kirin come up against Hina while Akari faces Urara, who is armed with a powerful revolver. Despite receiving some heavy damage from one of Urara's bullets, Akari follows Aria's advice and uses a nearby scooter to hit the enemy flag and win the match for her team. Just then, a mysterious girl sets off a chain reaction that causes the construction around everyone to start collapsing. However, they manage to escape unscathed thanks to the sniping efforts of Reki and a mysterious technique used by Akari.
| 6 | "Little Devils' Request"; Transliteration: "Koakuma-tachi no Irai" (Japanese: 小悪魔たちの依頼) | November 10, 2015 |
As Akari is promoted to D-rank following her match with Urara, Raika gets a little jealous over Riko clinging onto Kirin, who is in turn jealous of Raika being so close with Akari. Meanwhile, Aria becomes curious about the technique Akari used earlier, wondering if the accident was set up to force her to use it. Wanting Raika to spend more time with her, Kirin asks her to give her and her classmates derringer training before they put Raika in a dubious situation so that she would confirm her preference for Kirin.
| 7 | "Struggle Over Akari"; Transliteration: "Akari Sōdatsu-sen" (Japanese: あかり争奪戦) | November 17, 2015 |
After being rescued by her during the Quartet, Urara develops a crush on Akari and invites her to her house in the hopes of winning her friendship. This catches the attention of the equally obsessive Shino, who crashes the party and challenges Urara for the position of Akari's friend. As the two face off in a sword duel, Urara puts on pressure with a fencing lancer while Shino makes use of the environment. Just then, a girl that came to spectate the duel falls down a hole in the building, forcing Shino and Urara to work together to help Akari save her. Afterwards, Akari encourages Shino and Urara to be friends with each other, oblivious to their actual intentions.
| 8 | "Pool Trap"; Transliteration: "Pūru Torappu" (Japanese: プール・トラップ) | November 24, 2015 |
Urara invites Akari and the others to her company's water park, forming a secret alliance with Shino in order to cause Akari to have a swimsuit malfunction on film. However, Yuyu and Yaya get the swimsuits mixed up and give the malfunctioning one to Urara instead, resulting in the plan ending in a spectacular failure. Despite this, everyone manages to have fun, with Aria suggesting that she pay a visit to Akari's home.
| 9 | "Home Visit"; Transliteration: "Katei Hōmon" (Japanese: 家庭訪問) | December 1, 2015 |
After Nonoka has a foreboding dream, Aria comes to hers and Akari's home, announcing she'll be staying for a few days due to Butei being targeted recently. Aria joins Akari as she goes shopping in her neighborhood before everyone gets together for a sleepover. The next day, Aria is pursued by some terrorists, with Akari and the others deciding to assist her despite not wanting her to get involved. However, when given her gun back by Aria in order to assist her, Akari freezes up out of fear of accidentally killing someone, forcing Reki to pick up after her. After the case is resolved, Akari becomes shocked when Aria decides not to make her her Amica, feeling she is not suited to her dangerous missions. When pressured by Aria over why she hesitated earlier, Akari reluctantly reveals what she is most afraid of; her own terrifying ability to make perfect kill shots. Meanwhile, Riko, who had used the terrorists to distract Aria, prepares to make a move with her partners on Aria and Akari.
| 10 | "First Mission"; Transliteration: "Fāsuto Misshon" (Japanese: ファーストミッション) | December 8, 2015 |
When Aria becomes severely injured during a busjacking incident, Akari is approached by Riko's accomplice, Kyochikutou, who tells Akari to become hers if she doesn't want anyone else to get hurt. Later, as Akari and the others go to the hospital where Aria is being treated, Nonoka collapses before her, suffering from a condition that could cause her to lose her eyesight. Blaming herself, Akari explains to her friends how she comes from a lineage of spies whose deadly techniques got passed down from generation to generation. Two years ago, Kyochikutou, who is part of I-U, the Mamiya clan's enemy, attacked Akari's home and injected Nonoka with a poison. Hina informs the girls that the poison is one that will rob Nonoka of her senses before killing her, with Kyochikutou being the only one capable of neutralizing it. As Akari prepares to sacrifice herself, Aria reminds her of her goal of protecting others and the support of her friends, tasking her with taking down her enemy. With everyone in position, Akari goes to confront Kyochikutou, who offers the antidote to Nonoka's poison in exchange for Akari and her family's own poison, Takamakuri.
| 11 | "Showdown"; Transliteration: "Kessen" (Japanese: 決戦) | December 15, 2015 |
Kyochikutou sets her sights on taking out all of Akari's friends, starting off by subduing Hina with an acidic poison gas. She next comes up against Raika, hitting her with a paralysing poison, before confronting Urara and hitting her with a hallucigenic gas. Akari attempts to distract Kyochikutou so that Shino can launch a surprise attack, but Kyochikutou brings out a gatling gun, with Shino taking heavy damage from protecting Akari. Angered, Akari prepares to use the Takamakuri technique, which isn't a poison but instead uses electrodes to create a gyro-like attack, using what she learned from Aria to stay safe and destroys Kyochikutou's gun. As Kyochikutou is taken into custody, Aria informs Akari that another I-U agent is present, at which point Kyochikutou's older sister, Suimitsutou, attacks with a giant mecha.
| 12 | "A Pair of As"; Transliteration: "Futari no Ē" (Japanese: 二人のA) | December 22, 2015 |
Under heavy fire from Suimitsutou, Akari decides to act as a diversion so Aria can meet up with the others, who decide to help out despite their injuries. Working together, the girls use a combination of smoke screens and chaffing to block Suimitsutou's vision, allow Aria and Akari to take down the mech. With Kyochikutou relinquishing the antidote to Nonoka's poison, Aria decides that Akari would be better suited to work alongside her friends than as her Amica. Determined to prove herself capable of being by Aria's side, Akari asks to take the Amica Test one more time, this time with Aria fighting back. With both sides bringing out their strongest attacks, Akari manages to prove victorious and finally becomes Aria's official Amica.
