= Boku no Kanojo-sensei =

Japanese light novel series

- First light novel volume cover

僕のカノジョ先生
- Genre: Romantic comedy
- Light novel
- Written by: Yū Kagami
- Illustrated by: Oryo
- Published by: Media Factory
- Imprint: MF Bunko J
- Original run: August 25, 2018 – February 25, 2021
- Volumes: 9
- Manga
- Written by: Yū Kagami
- Illustrated by: Kani Hoshikawa
- Published by: Fujimi Shobo
- Imprint: Dragon Comics Age
- Magazine: Dra Dra Flat
- Original run: April 5, 2019 – present
- Volumes: 17

Boku no Kanojo-sensei (僕のカノジョ先生; lit. 'My Teacher-Girlfriend') is a Japanese light novel series written by Yū Kagami and illustrated by Oryo. It is published by Media Factory under their MF Bunko J imprint; nine volumes were released between August 2018 and February 2021. A manga adaptation illustrated by Kani Hoshikawa began serialization on the Nico Nico Seiga and KadoComi websites under Fujimi Shobo's Dra Dra Flat label in April 2019. It has been compiled into 17 volumes as of June 2026.

== Plot ==
Makoto Saigi, a high school student, has not trusted teachers ever since his kindergarten teacher rejected his childhood confession. One day, Maki Fujiki, his homeroom teacher who is popular for her beauty, calls him after class for "guidance counseling". He is surprised when she confesses to him, not knowing why such a well-admired teacher could have feelings for him. Maki challenges him to fall in love with her one day, even telling him that she would train her to become a student who loves her teacher.

== Characters ==
Makoto Saigi (彩木 慎, Saigi Makoto)
The main protagonist, he has had a negative view of teachers since kindergarten when his teacher broke her "promise" to marry him and married someone else. His views begin to change after Maka becomes his homeroom teacher. While he initially was skeptical about his relationship with Maki, he later develops genuine feelings for her.
Maki Fujiki (藤城 真香, Fujiki Maki)
The main heroine, a 24-year-old English teacher who is well-liked by the student body. She falls in love with Makoto. She was the school's student council president when she was in high school, and she studied at a top-grade university. She was inspired to pursue education by her late teacher, who was also the original owner of her car. At the end of the series, with her now in a relationship with Makoto, they visit her late teacher's grave.

=== SID ===
Karen Jinsho (陣所カレン, Jin sho Karen)
A third-year student as well as the student council president.
Miharu Saigi (彩木美春, Saigi miharu)
Makoto's younger sister and a first-year student.
Nui Amanashi (天無縫, Amanashi Nui)
Makoto's classmate. She also works as a gravure idol.
Tenka Kisou (貴宗 天華, Kisou Tenka)
Makoto's classmate. She is also Maki's younger sister whose taken by her mother after divorce.
Enri Shinbou (新望 縁里, Shinbou Enri)
Makoto's classmate. She is a captain of the Tennis Club and the student council secretary.
Muku Shinju (神樹 無垢, Shinju Muku)
A fifth-grade elementary student. She calls Makoto her "sensei".

== Media ==
=== Light novel ===
No.	Japanese release date	Japanese ISBN
1	August 25, 2018	978-4-04-065097-5
2	November 24, 2018	978-4-04-065301-3
3	February 25, 2019	978-4-04-065534-5
4	June 25, 2019	978-4-04-065737-0
5	October 25, 2019	978-4-04-064124-9
6	February 25, 2020	978-4-04-064448-6
7	June 25, 2020	978-4-04-064733-3
8	October 24, 2020	978-4-04-065940-4
9	February 25, 2021	978-4-04-680237-8

=== Manga ===
No.	Japanese release date	Japanese ISBN
1	October 25, 2019	978-4-04-073330-2
2	June 25, 2020	978-4-04-073655-6
3	October 25, 2020	978-4-04-073835-2
4	April 9, 2021	978-4-04-074048-5
5	August 6, 2021	978-4-04-074209-0
6	March 9, 2022	978-4-04-074459-9
7	April 8, 2022	978-4-04-074503-9
8	December 9, 2022	978-4-04-074833-7
9	April 7, 2023	978-4-04-074937-2
10	August 9, 2023	978-4-04-075069-9
11	March 8, 2024	978-4-04-075364-5
12	July 9, 2024	978-4-04-075512-0
13	December 9, 2024	978-4-04-075684-4; 978-4-04-075685-1 (SE)
14	May 9, 2025	978-4-04-075907-4
15	September 9, 2025	978-4-04-076074-2
16	February 9, 2026	978-4-04-076264-7
17	June 9, 2026	978-4-04-076429-0
18	November 9, 2026	978-4-04-076637-9

== Reception ==
By March 2024, the series had over 6 million copies in circulation.
