= Gun Princess =

Light novel and manga

- The Japanese release of the first Gun Princess light novel The Majesty, published by Media Factory on April 24, 2004

銃姫 (Jū Hime)
- Light novel
- Written by: Madoka Takadono
- Illustrated by: Katsumi Enami
- Published by: Media Factory
- English publisher: NA: Seven Seas Entertainment
- Imprint: MF Bunko J
- Original run: April 24, 2004 – December 2009
- Volumes: 11
- Manga

Gun Princess: Sincerely Night
- Written by: Madoka Takadono
- Illustrated by: Kei Ichimonji
- Published by: Kodansha
- Magazine: Monthly Shōnen Sirius
- Original run: February 25, 2006 – September 22, 2008
- Volumes: 4

Gun Princess (銃姫, Jū Hime) is a Japanese light novel series written Madoka Takadono and illustrated by Katsumi Enami. The first novel was published under Media Factory's MF Bunko J imprint in April 2004, and as of December 2009, eleven novels have been released. The series is set in a world where humans have discovered a way to seal their long-lost magical powers into bullets, starting an era of constant warfare. Cedric, Ambrosia and Elwing set out to find the Gun Princess, a powerful weapon that could change the fate of the world. A manga adaptation written by Takadono and illustrated by Kei Ichimonji was serialized in Kodansha's Monthly Shōnen Sirius magazine, and was later released in four tankōbon from November 2006 to September 2008.

== Plot ==
Long ago, humans angered the gods and lost their magical powers. However, the humans refused to give their powers and discovered a way to seal magic into bullets. Since then, the world has lived in a state of constant warfare. Cedric, Ambrosia and Elwing begin a journey to find the Gun Princess, a powerful weapon that could change the fate of the world.

== Media ==
=== Light novels ===
The Gun Princess light novels are written by Madoka Takadono and illustrated by Katsumi Enami. The first novel was published under Media Factory's MF Bunko J imprint on April 4, 2004, and as of December 25, 2009, eleven novels have been released. Sharp Point Press licensed the Chinese-language release in Taiwan. On September 13, 2006, Seven Seas Entertainment announced that they had acquired the rights to an English-language release of Gun Princes.

=== Manga ===
A manga adaptation titled Gun Princess: Sincerely Night was written by Takadono and illustrated by Kei Ichimonji. It was serialized in Kodansha's Monthly Shōnen Sirius magazine, and later released in four tankōbon from November 22, 2006, to September 22, 2008. Sharp Point Press has licensed the manga for a Chinese-language release in Taiwan.
