= MF Bunko J =

Japanese publishing label

MF Bunko J (MF文庫J) is a publishing label affiliated with the Japanese publishing company Media Factory. It was established in July 2002 and is a light novel label that is aimed at young men with a focus on visual novel-style plots and harem romantic comedies.

== Light novels published under MF Bunko J ==
=== 0-9 ===
Title	Author	Illustrator	No. of volumes
101 Banme no Hyaku Monogatari	Kenji Saitō	Ryohka	8
14-Sai to Illustrator	Yukiya Murasaki	Mizoguchi Kēji	8
0416 & 0417	Mariko Shimizu	toi8	2

=== A ===
Title	Author	Illustrator	No. of volumes
Absolute Duo	Takumi Hiiragiboshi	Yuu Asaba	11
Amakawa Amane no Hitei Kōshiki	Tetsu Haruma	Kanae Hontani	4
Aoba-kun to Uchū-jin	Shūmei Matsuno	Chōniku	3
Arase Haruka, Yōsha Nashi!	Masato Kumagai	Sakana	3
Ashita, Kyō no Kimi ni Aenakutemo	Shirō Yayoi	Otohiko Takano	1
Astronoto!	Chūgaku Akamatsu	bomi	3
Asobi ni Ikuyo!	Okina Kamino	Hōden Eizō	20
Avalon	Mamoru Oshii	toi8	1

=== B ===
Title	Author	Illustrator	No. of volumes
Baroque K/Night	Tetsu Haruma	Kanae Hontani	4
Boku no Kanojo-sensei	Yū Kagami	Oryō	9
Boku to DoS to Fujoshi to Nōkin	Tetsu Haruma	Kanae Hontani	2
Boku to Kanojo ga Ichaicha Ichaicha	Meguru Kazami	Yuka Takashina	3
Boku wa Tomodachi ga Sukunai	Hirasaka Yomi	Buriki	11
Brigandine in the Wind	Takeru Koyama	Hinata Katagiri	2

=== C ===
Title	Author	Illustrator	No. of volumes
Cat Tail Output!	Okina Kamino	Nishida	4
Charlotte wa Tada, Jiken wo Tokitai	Hinachihoko	Minori Chigusa	1
Cheat na Boku no Aho no Ko Ikuseiron	Takeru Koyama	Reia	2
Chikaze no Legends	Yū Kagami	Mikeō	2
Chi wo kakeru Niji	Ren'ichi Nanai	Rui Hikarizaki	1
Chocotto Sister: Four seasons	Gō Zappa	Sakura Takeuchi	1
Chu Paradise	Akira Aihara	Miko	1
Class no Dai Kirai na Joshi to Kekkon suru Koto ni Natta	Seiju Amano	Nanami Narumi	10
Classroom Crisis	Hajime Taguchi	Lay-duce, Rin	3
Classroom Crisis Another Crisis	Hajime Asano	Kingin	2
Culdcept Sōden: Storm Bring World	Tō Ubukata	Koban Sameda	2
Current Tale	Shirou Yayoi	Ayumu Motoi	3

=== D ===
Title	Author	Illustrator	No. of volumes
Dame Makishi no Herutstrasse	Washiro Fujiki	Keiji Yamamoto	2
Digital Eden Attracts Humanity	Takaaki Kaima	Ruria Miyuki	2
Divergence Eve	Tōru Nozaki	Toshinari Yamashita et al.	3
Dokuritsu Gakuen Kokka no Heroic Slayer	Ginpachi Kagami	Pulp Piroshi	3
Dreamy Dreamer	Shirō Yayoi	Ayumu Motoi	1
Dual Sword Liberator	Ryo Iwanami	Eiri Shirai	2
Duel in the Reverse	Nakahiro	Karory	1

=== E ===
Title	Author	Illustrator	No. of volumes
Eirun Last Code: Kakū Sekai Yori Senjō e	Ryūnosuke Higashi	Akemi Mikoto, Konomu Sekiyama, Ryūichi Sadamatsu	4
Exodus Reactors	Tōru Heinagare	On	3
Ex-Phazer	Sow Kamishiro	FiFS	3

=== F ===
Title	Author	Illustrator	No. of volumes
Final Seeker - Rescue Wings	Issui Ogawa	Nanashiki Yamamoto	1
Fudaraku na Ruishu	Kisetsu Morita	Life Itō	2
Fushigi Tsukai	Shin'ya Kasai	URA	2
Fūsui Gakuen	Natsumidori	Nagira	8 (Franchise); 2 (Extra)
Fūsui Shōjo	Natsumidori	Sunao Minakata	3
Futatabi Hajimaru Escatora	Kazuma Jōchi	Nauribon	2

=== G ===
Title	Author	Illustrator	No. of volumes
Gad Guard	Kyōhei Umoto	Yoshitsune Izuna	4
Gakusen Toshi Asterisk	Yuu Miyazaki	Okiura	16 + 1 side story
Galgo!!!!!	Tomoyasu Higa	Kei Kawahara	2
Gankutsuou: The Count of Monte Cristo	Shūichi Kamiyama	Hidenori Matsubara et al.	3
Genten Kaiki Walkers	Kisetsu Morita	Kurehito Misaki	2
Giaku no Ō	Hiroshi Nikaidō	Vane	3
Gimai Seikatsu	Ghost Mikawa	Hiten	17 + 1 Side Story
Gindan no Gunswordia	Yukiya Murasaki	Takahiro Tsurusaki	3
Godannar	Kyōhei Umoto	Takahiro Kimura et al.	4
Gods' Games We Play	Kei Sazane	Toiro Tomose	9
Golem Girls	Tomokazu Ōkubo	KEI	2
Gravion Zwei	Fumihiko Shimo	Takehiro Miura et al.	2
Green Green	Yoshikazu Kuwashima	Kurotama Shōkai	3
Grimoire no Tate	Tomo Hanama	Namanie	2
Guild 〈Shiroki Tate〉 no Aubade	Misaku Kataba	Hidemi Shirai	2
Gun Princess	Madoka Takatono	Katsumi Enami	8

=== H ===
Title	Author	Illustrator	No. of volumes
Haken Chronicle	Ryū Sugiyama	Gayarō	2
Hakugin no Xestmarg	Tohkei Amano	Kurogin	3
Hashire, Ute!	Okina Kamino	Refeia	12
Haunted!	Yomi Hirasaka	Yū Katase	4
Hensuki	Tomo Hanama	sune	14
Hentai Ōji to Warawanai Neko	Sōu Sagara	Kantoku	11
Heroine Tame Meister	Toishi Hiroki	Racer	1
Hidan no Aria	Chūgaku Akamatsu	Kobuichi	22
Hidan no Aria AA	Chūgaku Akamatsu	Kobuichi	4
Hime-sama, Sekai Horobu kara Gohan Tabete Ikimasuyo!	Noboru Okazaki	Oshioshio	1
Hitokakera	Nako Hoshiie	Warawara Fujiwara	1
Himemiya-san no Naka no Hito	Sōhei Tsukimi	Ein	3
Hōkago Login	Sow Kamishiro	Mikako Mikaki	3
Hōkago no Game Friend, Kimi no Ita Kisetsu	Yukiya Murasaki	Yukiko Horiguchi	1
Holy Maiden	Jun Hashimoto	Chiyoko	2
Hrasvelgr Exceed	Misou Nanau	Masato Mutsumi	4
Hybrid Gakuen	Oda Kyōdai	Renga (1 only), Atsushi Suzumi (2 and 3)	3

=== I ===
Title	Author	Illustrator	No. of volumes
Iconoclast!	Ichirō Sakaki	kyō	10
Ima wa Mada Osanajimi no Imōto Desu Kedo	Kō Suzukure	Ayami	3
Infinite Stratos	Izuru Yumizuru	Okiura(Original); CHOCO(Reprints)	7 (the last 5 volumes transferred to Overlap Bunko)
Iōjima Gakuen	Akira Suzuki	Jiji	4
Isekai Gōmon Hime	Keishi Ayasato	Ukai Saki	10
Isekai nara NEET ga Hataraku to Omotta? Elf no Hime wo Dorei ni Shite Sekai wo Shihai Sasemasu.	Mikata Karino	Neco Metal	2

=== J ===
Title	Author	Illustrator	No. of volumes
Jōtō	Isao Miura	Runa	8
Junk Force	Hideki Kakinuma	Eiji Komatsu	5
Junk Force: from Mars	Hideki Kakinuma	Bijin Happō	2

=== K ===
Title	Author	Illustrator	No. of volumes
Kachikomi Bride!	Kyōsuke Sakai	Inayama	1
Kage Kara Mamoru! ("Mamoru the Shadow")	Tarō Achi	Sai Madara	12
Kamisama Kazoku	Yoshikazu Kuwashima	Suzuhito Yasuda	8 (Franchise); 1 (Z)
Kamisama no Okiniiri	Yasujirō Uchiyama	Taketo Sanada	4
Kämpfer	Toshihiko Tsukiji	Senmu	15
Kana	Tōru Tamegai	Sōshi Hirose	1
Kannōsha Saki: Net stalker no Wana	Oda Kyōdai	Hideyuki Takenami	1
Kanojo wa Missile	Kō Sudō	Ryūsuke Hamamoto	1
Kanokon	Katsumi Nishino	Koin	14
Kasō Ryōiki no Elysion	Kazuma Jōchi	Nauribon	2
Kaze no Kishi Hime	Noboru Yamaguchi	Eiji Usatsuka	2
Kekkyoku, Ninja to Dragon wa Docchi ga Tsuyoi no?	Yasushi Date	Sorimurayoji	4
Kenma Kensō Kensei Kenmai	Akihiko Ureshino	Kaguyudu	1
Kenshin no Keishōsha	Yū Kagami	Mikeō	7
Kimi ga Nozomu Eien	Kenji Nojima	Yōko Kikuchi et al.	3
Kiraho Sakurano	Sōhei Tsukimi	Nagare Yūryū	3
Koi wo Shite wa Ikenai Game, Furaretemo Kimi ni Koi wo Suru	Misō Nanau	Mika Mikami	2
Kudan no Hanashi wo Shimashōka	Yasujirō Uchiyama	Asami	1
Kujibiki Unbalance	Michiko Yokote & Friends (1st), Tatsuya Hamazaki (2nd)	Keito Koume & Kengō Yakumo	3 (1st); 2 (2nd)
Kurau Phantom Memory	Hiroshi Tominaga	Tomomi Ozaki & toi8	2
Kurayami ni Yagi wo sagashite	Masaya Hoshika	Sikorsky	3
Kuro no Strika	Ao Jyumonji	Suzuri	5
Kurukuru Real	Naoko Haneda	x6suke	1
Kuzu dakedo Inō Battle de Haken Nerattemita	Tetsurō Mikado	Yume no Owari	1
Kyū-Kyū Cute!	Kenji Nojima	Kurihito Mutō	14
Kyūkyoku Shinka shita Furu Daibu RPG ga Genjitsu yori mo Kusoge Dattara	Light Tuchihi	Youta	4

=== L ===
Title	Author	Illustrator	No. of volumes
Last Period	Happy Elements	Happy Elements	1
Liar, Liar	Haruki Kuou	Konomi	15 + 1 side story
Limitress!	Kō Sudō	Yayoi Hizuki	3
Locksmith Karna no Bōken	Sōhei Tsukimi	Ginpachi	4
Love to Donshoku no Coldrix	Iori Miyazawa	Hitogome	1

=== M ===
Title	Author	Illustrator	No. of volumes
Macaron Daisuki na Onna no Ko ga Dōnikakōnika Sennen Ikitsuzukeru Ohanashi.	Karate	Wannyanpu	1
Machine-Doll wa Kizutsukanai	Reiji Kaito	Ruroo	17
Madan no Ō to Vanadis	Tsukasa Kawaguchi	Hinata Katagiri, Yoshi☆Wo	18
Magaku no Haō to Kahō no Jūhime	Mochizuki Kinako	Nardack	2
Mage Oblige	Yasujirō Uchiyama	Suzuri	1
Magika no Kenshi to Vasreus	Mitsuki Mihara	CHuN	11
Mahō Sensō	Hisashi Suzuki	Lia Luna	12
Majo Goroshi no Eiyū to Uragiri no Yūsha	Mizuki Nagano	Satsuki	1
Majo no Seitokaichō	Akira	Atsushi Suzumi	2
Majo Rumika no Akai ito	Hajime Taguchi	Kazuoki	2
Maken no Gunshi to Arks Legion	Senji Ichinichi	Oryo	4
Meiyaku no Leviathan	Jō Taketsuki	Yūji Nimura	7
Mikagura Gakuen Kumikyoku	Last Note.	Akina	8
Minami-Aoyama Shōjo Book Center	Yoshikazu Kuwashima	Shichimi Koshō	2
Minikui Ahiru no Koi	Akira	Akemi Mikoto	4
MM!	Shūmei Matsuno	QP: flapper	10 (and 2 side story novels)
Monocheros no Majō wa Ugatsu	Kōhei Ito	Mishima	3
Morte	Keika Hanada	Yone Kazuki	3
Mukiryoku Yūsha to Shiritagari Maō	Fuyuki Fuyuki	Haruka Minazuki	3
Mushi to Medama	Akira	Mausu Mitsuki	6

=== N ===
Title	Author	Illustrator	No. of volumes
Nagisa Fortissimo	Kaya kizaki	Kasumi Kirino	5
Nanahon Ude no Jessica	Kō Kimura	Kazuyuki Yoshizumi	1
Nananin no Majo to Haikaburi no Sora no Legatus	Mao Mano	Senmu	1
Nanaya Monogatari: DT ibun	Masaki Wachi	Jinroku	1
Natsunagi Nagisa wa Mada, Joshikōsei de Itai.	Shusui Tsukimi	Hanekoto	2
Naze Boku no Sekai wo Dare mo Oboeteinainoka?	Kei Sazane	neco	9
Nekura Shōjo wa Kuromahō de Koi wo suru	Masato Kumagai	Elet	5
Necroma.	Yomi Hirasaka	Jirō	3
Nepenthes	Mariko Shimizu	toi8	1
Nishino ~Gakunai Caste Saikai Ni Shite Inou Sekai Saikyo No Shonen~	Buncololi	Matanonki	10
Noein	Miya Asakawa	Fumio Matsumoto	1
No Game No Life	Yū Kamiya	Yū Kamiya	13
Nurse Witch Komugi	Ichirō Sakaki & Shinobu Takeno	Akio Watanabe et al.	2

=== O ===
Title	Author	Illustrator	No. of volumes
Ochite Kita Naga to Horobiyuku Majo no Kuni	Kō Maisaka	Yōta	9
Omae wo Onii-chan ni Shiteyarōka!?	Ryū Sugiyama	Kakao	3
Onegai Dakara, Ato Gofun!	Kyōsuke Sakai	Ao Kimishima	3
Onii-chan dakedo Ai sae Areba Kankei Naiyone!	Suzuki Daisuke	Uruu Gekka	12
Onna Kishi-san, Jusco Ikōyo	Hiro Itō	Eight Shimotsuki	4
Ōkoku kara kita Shōnen	Okina Kamino	Mattaku Mōsuke	1
Ore no Ryōri ga Isekai wo Sukū!	Fumihiko Ochi	Mutsutake	1
Ore to Ichino no Game Dōkōkai Katsudō Nisshi	Tetsu Haruma	Kanae Hontani	11
Ore to Mamono no Isekai Restaurant	Yūsuke Ochiai	Syroh	2
Origin: Spirits of the Past	Kyōhei Umoto	Kōji Ogata	1
Oshiego ni Kyōhaku Sareru no wa Hanzai desu ka?	Sō Sagara	Momoko	8
Over Image	Masahiro Yusa	Matsuri Santa	4
Override in Moon City	Tamezou	PikoMint	1

=== P ===
Title	Author	Illustrator	No. of volumes
Pandora	Katsumi Nishino	Hagane Tsurugi	2
Paracelsus no Musume	Yū Godai	Mel Kishida	10
Part Time Princess	Sō Kamishiro	Shūtarō Yamada	3
Period kara Hajimaru Madō Kisho	Satori Mizuki	Fumitake Moekibara	1
PiPit!!	Masaki Wachi	Yūsuke Shiba	2
Piyo Piyo Kingdom	Kō Kimura	Miho Takeoka	3
Princess Maker 4	Akira Suzuki	Naoto Tenhiro et al.	1
Project Minerva	Hiroya Moriyasu	Itokatsu	1
Puipui!	Natsu Midori	Namori	14

=== R ===
Title	Author	Illustrator	No. of volumes
RahXephon	Hiroshi Ōnogi	Akihiro Yamada et al.	6
Re:Zero kara Hajimeru Isekai Seikatsu	Tappei Nagatsuki	Shinichirō Otsuka	45 + 6 side stories
Remake Our Life!	Nachi Kio	Eretto	12
Rinne no Lagrange	Sōhei Tsukimi	Haruyuki Morisawa	4
Ruriiro ni Boketa Nichijō	Yasushi Date	Eretto	4
Ryokuyō no Questers Lyric	Sako Aizawa	So-bin	1

=== S ===
Title	Author	Illustrator	No. of volumes
Saikawa Yui wa demo, aidoru de iru	Shao Senlin	Almic	1
Saishū Agent Chikaru	Jun'ichi Ōsako	Rei	1
Sanzensekai no Maō-sama	Hiroyuki Ao	Tsubame Nozomi	2
Sasaki and Peeps	Buncololi	Kantoku	13
Sate, Game Gardo wo Kōryaku Shiyōka.	Noboru Okazaki	Peko	7
School, Sekai, Eden	Takafumi Nanatsuki	Hiroki Kawamura	3
Scoop Musou: "Scoop Hadouhou!" ( `・ω・´)♂〓〓〓〓★(゜Д ゜ ;;;).:∴ Dogooo	Yasohachi Tsuchise	Hagure Yuuki	4
Seiken no Blacksmith	Isao Miura	Runa	16
Seiken Gakuin no Makentsukai	Yū Shimizu	Asagi Tōsaka	16
Seikoku no Dragonar	Shiki Mizuchi	Kohada Shimesaba	20
Seirei Tsukai no Blade Dance	Yū Shimizu	Hanpen Sakura	20 + 1 extra
Sekai ga Owaru Basho e Kimi wo Tsurete Iku	Shin'ya Kasai	Osamu Oya	1
Sekai no Owari no Encore	Kei Sazane	Haruaki Fuyuno	7
Sekai Saidai no Kobito	Naoko Haneda	Sunaho Yobe	2
Sendō War: Sekai wo Uchikudaku mono	Kenji Ōbayashi	Haru Wamusato	1
Shibō Yūgi de Meshi o Kū	Yushi Ukai	Nekometaru	10
Shiinamachi-senpai no Anzenbi	Kenji Saitō	Carnelian	3
Shindō Yūsha to Maid Onee-san	Kōta Nozomi	Pyon-Kichi	4
Shinreki no Apocrypha	Amara Aoyama	Nidy-2D-	2
Shinsei Mahō wa Shikkoku no Urushibara-san	Kisetsu Morita	Mitha	2
Shiro no Noroi	Namahage2	△○□×	1
Shitsuji na Shitsuji to Testament	Tetsurō Mikado	Yuki Takano	3
Shuraba Lovers!	Haiya Kishi	Purinpurin	11
Shūen no Shiori	Suzumu	Komine, Saine	4
Sōkyū no Lapis Lazuli	Hajime Asano	Seiji Kikuchi	7
Sōkyū no Megami	Akira Suzuki	Ganpon	2
Solaris the Abyssal	Lucky Ruci	Asagiri	1
Sonna Sekai wa Kowashite Shimae: Qualidea Code	Sō Sagara	Kantoku	2
Sora ni Usagi ga Noboru Koro	Yomi Hirasaka	Hiromu Minato	4
Sora to Tsuki no Oh	Kei Shimojima	Ginka	2
Spiritual: Hatarakazaru mono Kū bekarazu	Yoshiki Hiraya	Kashimami	1
Stratos 4	Takeshi Mori	Noriyasu Yamauchi et al.	4

=== T ===
Title	Author	Illustrator	No. of volumes
Tadashi, Kare wa Yandere ni sae Motemasen	Hiro Itō	Yukie	2
Tantei wa Mō, Shindeiru	Nigojū	Umibōzu	13
Tenbatsu!	Mitsuhiro Yamada	Chisato Naruse	1
Tenrō Toshi 〈Sephirot〉	Kōsuke Akitsuki	Pyon-kti	1
Tensei Maō no Isekai Slow Life Oideyo Maō Mura!	Namekojirushi	Runa	2
The King of Braves GaoGaiGar Final	Yūichirō Takeda	Takahiro Kimura et al.	2
The SoulTaker	Masaki Wachi	Akio Watanabe et al.	2
Tokyo Ziggurat	Chihare Ameno	Jirō Tomioka	1
Tori wa Tori de aru tameni	Kenji Nojima	Oxijiyen	4
Tsubasa	Shunpei Asō	Kaori Fujita	3
Tsuki Tsuki!	Yujin Goto	Riko Korie	12
Tsurugi no Joō to Rakuin no Ko	Hikaru Sugii	Yuni	8

=== U ===
Title	Author	Illustrator	No. of volumes
UFO Ultramaiden Valkyrie	Tasuku Saiga et al. Kaishaku (Original Creator)	Maki Fujii et al.	4
Unsimulated Incubator	Noritake Tao	Yuichi Murakami	3
Uso	Mariko Shimizu	toi8	3

=== V ===
Title	Author	Illustrator	No. of volumes
Vanquish Overload	Tōki Yanagimi	Shiromiso	4
Voices of a Distant Star	Waku Ōba; Makoto Shinkai (Original Creator)	Kō Yaginuma	1

=== W ===
Title	Author	Illustrator	No. of volumes
Wagahai wa Orc de Aru. Onna Kishi wa Mada Inai.	Shun Uchida	Norio Tsukudani	1
Wandaba Style	Kōichi Taki	GotoP et al.	1

=== X ===
Title	Author	Illustrator	No. of volumes
X no Maō	Kōhei Ito	Ayuya Bankoku	3

=== Y ===
Title	Author	Illustrator	No. of volumes
Yogu no Monshoshi	Fumihiko Ochi	Kaguyudu	3
Yōkoso Jitsuryoku Shijō Shugi no Kyōshitsu e	Kinugasa Shōgo	Shunsaku Tomose	11 + 3 side story
Yōkoso Jitsuryoku Shijō Shugi no Kyōshitsu e Ninensei-hen	Kinugasa Shōgo	Shunsaku Tomose	12 + 3 side story
Yōkoso Jitsuryoku Shijō Shugi no Kyōshitsu e Sannensei-hen	Kinugasa Shōgo	Shunsaku Tomose	4
Yōryoku Senkan Terrarium	Natsumidori	Okama	3
Yūkyū Tenbōdai no Kai	Katsuya Sayazuka	Yasu	1
Yūsha to Maō ga Dengeki Doumei!	Agobarrier	Eri Natsume	1

=== Z ===
Title	Author	Illustrator	No. of volumes
Zarusoba (kawaii)	Yasohachi Tsuchise	Hagure Yūki	1
Zenryaku, Eiyū Kōho wa Tsuyoku Naru Tame ni Sensei to XX Shimasu.	Tetsu Hamura	Asahi Takashina	1
Zero no Tsukaima ("Zero's Familiar" or "The Familiar of Zero")	Noboru Yamaguchi	Eiji Usatsuka	22
Zero no Tsukaima Gaiden: Tabitha no Bōken	Noboru Yamaguchi	Eiji Usatsuka	3
