= Aria the Scarlet Ammo =

Japanese light novel series

- Cover of the first light novel volume, featuring Aria H. Kanzaki

緋弾のアリア (Hidan no Aria)
- Genre: Girls with guns; Romantic comedy
- Light novel
- Written by: Chūgaku Akamatsu
- Illustrated by: Kobuichi
- Published by: Media Factory
- English publisher: NA: Digital Manga
- Imprint: MF Bunko J
- Original run: August 25, 2008 – present
- Volumes: 45 + extra
- Manga
- Illustrated by: Yoshino Koyoka
- Published by: Media Factory
- English publisher: NA: Digital Manga
- Magazine: Monthly Comic Alive
- Original run: September 26, 2009 – present
- Volumes: 26
- Manga

Aria the Scarlet Ammo AA
- Written by: Shogako Tachibana
- Published by: Square Enix
- Magazine: Young Gangan
- Original run: November 5, 2010 – May 18, 2018
- Volumes: 14
- Anime television series
- Directed by: Takashi Watanabe
- Produced by: Youhei Hayashi; Masazumi Katou; Shigaeki Komatsu; Yuuji Matsukura; Akimasa Sasao; Yasuhiro Yamaguchi
- Written by: Hideki Shirane
- Music by: Takumi Ozawa
- Studio: J.C.Staff
- Licensed by: Crunchyroll (Note: In North America through Funimation, in United Kingdom and Ireland through Manga Entertainment, and in Australia through Madman Entertainment.)
- Original network: TBS, CBC, MBS, MBC, BS-TBS
- English network: PH: Animax; US: Funimation Channel
- Original run: April 15, 2011 – July 1, 2011
- Episodes: 12 + OVA
- Anime television series

Aria the Scarlet Ammo AA
- Directed by: Takashi Kawabata
- Produced by: Noritomo Isogai; Masao Fukuda; Hajime Kamata; Keisuke Kaminaga; Shinpei Yamashita; Takanori Yamayoshi
- Written by: Fumihiko Shimo
- Music by: Takuro Iga
- Studio: Doga Kobo (Note: Assistance (協力) for all episodes provided by Jumondou.)
- Licensed by: Crunchyroll
- Original network: AT-X, Tokyo MX, Sun TV, KBS, TV Aichi, BS11
- English network: SEA: Animax Asia; UK: Animax; US: Funimation Channel
- Original run: October 6, 2015 – December 22, 2015
- Episodes: 12
- Original net animation

Aria the Scarlet Ammo Corto
- Directed by: Yoshifumi Sasahara
- Written by: Kenji Saitō; Chūgaku Akamatsu
- Studio: Bellnox Films
- Released: April 2027 – scheduled

Aria the Scarlet Ammo (Japanese: 緋弾のアリア, Hepburn: Hidan no Aria) is a Japanese light novel series written by Chūgaku Akamatsu and illustrated by Kobuichi. As of June 2026, 45 main volumes have been published by Media Factory under their MF Bunko J label. A manga adaptation by Yoshino Koyoka started serialization in the seinen manga magazine Monthly Comic Alive in September 2009. An anime adaptation by J.C.Staff aired between April and June 2011. An original video animation (OVA) episode was released on December 21, 2011. A spin-off manga titled Aria the Scarlet Ammo AA by Shogako Tachibana was serialized in Square Enix's Young Gangan magazine from November 2010 to May 2018, with an anime adaptation by Doga Kobo airing between October and December 2015. A new short anime series by Bellnox Films titled Aria the Scarlet Ammo Corto is set to begin streaming in April 2027.

== Plot ==
The setting of the story features Butei (武偵; "war scout"), short for buso tantei (武装探偵; "armed detective"), a national qualification established to counter worsening crime conditions around the world. The Butei holders are trained in various specialized fields, and are permitted to possess various weapons and capture criminals. Kinji Tōyama is a student at Tokyo Butei High, a universal educational facility for the training of Butei. At this school, students with an aptitude for the work undertake special training in order to learn the path of the Butei. Shortly after Kinji decides to quit the Academy for personal reasons, he is attacked by the Butei Killer, a criminal notorious for eliminating Butei—a case of the hunters becoming the hunted. The elite Butei Assault prodigy Aria H. Kanzaki comes to his rescue and from that moment on, Kinji's future as a Butei changes drastically.

The side story, Aria the Scarlet Ammo AA, follows Akari Mamiya, an E-ranked Butei who applies to become Aria's "Amica".

== Characters ==
=== Main characters ===
Kinji Tōyama (遠山 金次, Tōyama Kinji)
Voiced by: Junji Majima (Japanese); Todd Haberkorn (English)
A student at Butei High School. He was initially ranked E (lowest combat rank) due to missing the third term's final examination. However, when he is sexually aroused (such as sticking his face in a girl's chest, getting kissed or by him kissing a girl) he enters a state known as "Hysteria Mode" in which his cognitive and physical abilities increase to around thirty times his normal state, which allows him to perform feats of near-superhuman strength and skill, such as accurately shooting up the muzzle of an enemy gun, swinging his knife at supersonic speeds, and accurately shooting enemy bullets out of the air. Hysteria Mode is a genetic trait that all members of the Tōyama family possess, and is stated to be a highly evolved version of the natural male instinct to protect women. As such, when in Hysteria Mode, Kinji's major weakness is the fact that he cannot directly harm women, though he is still able to fight and restrain them without directly hurting them. In addition to this, Hysteria Mode also causes Kinji to develop a suave and seductive attitude towards women, which makes him very attractive to them while in Hysteria Mode. He is currently enrolled in the Inquesta department, though in the past, he was a prodigy (being rank S) of the Assault department, the most dangerous department in Butei High. Over the course of the series, Kinji grows to respect (and eventually develops romantic feelings for) Aria. He proves his feelings for Aria by kissing her on the lips in episode 5, though this is done to calm her down. Currently, his feelings for Aria are so strong that even the slightest bit of sexual/romantic involvement with Aria will instantly activate Hysteria Mode.
His gun of choice is a Beretta 92F (which has been illegally modified to fire a three-round burst; he refers to it as the Beretta Kinji Model). He also wields a butterfly knife. In Volume 6 of the light novel he obtains a black Desert Eagle (which has been modified to fire in bursts as well as auto) which belonged to his father and a double-edged seax (modified with a hidden sheath and a reinforced rubber handle) which belonged to Sherlock Holmes. When he activates Hysteria Mode, he is able to dual-wield both the Beretta and Desert Eagle as well as the Butterfly Knife and the Seax, making him earn the title of "Quadra of Mimicry" in the series.
Aria Holmes Kanzaki (神崎・H(ホームズ)・アリア, Kanzaki Hōmuzu Aria)
Voiced by: Rie Kugimiya (Japanese); Leah Clark (English)
A transfer student to the Butei High School in Japan. An "Assault" department elite rank S (the highest rank), she wishes to recruit Kinji into her team after their encounter. She has earned the title of "Quadra", meaning someone who can dual-wield both guns and swords. Her weapons of choice are two Colt Government Model M1911A1 semi-automatic pistols (one black and one silver) with custom hinge type triggers (as opposed to the traditional straight pull triggers of the M1911) and custom grips. She also uses two undersized Japanese swords known as kodachi. The "H" in her middle name stands for "Holmes" as she is a descendant of Sherlock Holmes himself, and her full name is Aria "Holmes" Kanzaki IV. She is very short for her age. Her stunted growth is due to a bullet embedded in her back made of a special material known as HihiIrokane. Irokane is a special element that can grant a normal human superpowers. HihiIrokane is red Irokane and in order to make use of its properties requires a childish nature and prideful personality. Although Kinji has learned about the special properties of the bullet and the potential powers it gives her, Aria seems largely unaware of anything unusual about the bullet or herself. All she knows is that a stranger shot her for unknown reasons and that the bullet can't be removed safely. As a side effect of the HihiIrokane bullet lodged within her, Aria's eye and hair color (which were originally sapphire blue and flaxen blonde) changed to a deep ruby and pinkish strawberry blonde respectively. Her mother is Japanese and her father is half English, half Japanese. Her paternal grandmother is a member of the British royal family, having been knighted and received the title of "dame". Aria develops feelings for Kinji after they kiss in episode 5, and gets jealous when other girls approach him.
Shirayuki Hotogi (星伽 白雪, Hotogi Shirayuki)
Voiced by: Mikako Takahashi (Japanese); Brina Palencia (English)
A female student attending Butei High School and Kinji's childhood friend. She is enrolled in the special department known as SSR and her Butei rank is A. She's the current student council chairman, and president of various clubs including the gardening club, handicraft club, and girls' volleyball club. According to Kinji, she is a perfect Japanese beauty except for one flaw - jealousy, which turns her into a berserker who assaults any girl approaching Kinji. When she finds out that Aria is living with Kinji she tries to murder her. She is shown to love Kinji to the point that she will do anything for him. Kinji and Shirayuki kiss in episode 8, and since then Shirayuki's feelings for Kinji have increased to the point that she is willing to appear nude in front of him in order for him to notice her. She uses a Japanese sword named Irokane Ayame as her weapon of choice. It is later revealed that her name, Shirayuki, was an alias used to conceal her real name, Himiko.
Riko Mine (峰 理子, Mine Riko)
Voiced by: Mariya Ise (Japanese); Luci Christian (English)
A female student at Butei High School and a friend of Kinji's. She is enrolled in the Inquesta department along with Kinji. Although often considered the biggest idiot in Kinji's class, this is a deliberate burikko facade which she drops when she is forced into dangerous circumstances. She has a talent for intelligence assessment and, at Butei High, gossip. She enjoys customizing her uniform in an Elegant Gothic Lolita style. She wields two Walther P99s and two knives and, much like Aria, has earned the title of "Quadra".
Near the end of the first volume, Riko reveals that she is a descendant of Arsène Lupin. Her real name is Riko Mine Lupin IV. Riko also reveals that she is the Butei Killer. She appears to have an inferiority complex towards the first Lupin and wants to exceed his legacy. The reason for this, and why she despises being referred to by her generation's number, is due to the circumstances under which she grew up. Orphaned at a young age, she was taken in by Vlad/Toru but kept locked in a cell with very little food and muddy water, and eventually was used as an experimental subject by Vlad/Toru. During this time he repeatedly told her that she's worthless (since she hadn't inherited any of the past Lupins' abilities) and that her only redeeming quality was that she could be used to produce another generation of the Lupin name, Lupin the V. Riko was eventually released from her captivity by Vlad/Toru and promised complete freedom provided that she was able to surpass the original Lupin. Her original plan was to recreate the historical encounter between the original Holmes and Lupin, with Aria and Kinji playing the roles of Sherlock and Watson. By defeating both of them she would surpass her ancestor since the original encounter ended in a draw. This plan fails, but Riko's able to convince them to aid her in recovering a memento from Vlad/Toru.
After helping Kinji and Aria defeat Vlad, Riko helps Aria by providing evidence that Vlad/Toru, and not her mother, Kanae Kanzaki, was truly behind all of the Butei Killer murders, and so reducing Kanae's sentence and delaying her impending execution. Riko appears to have feelings for Kinji, but these feelings may not be completely healthy because she constantly attempts to seduce Kinji - attempts which fail since Kinji is able to see through her machinations. She kisses Kinji after he points out that by defeating Vlad/Toru, she has surpassed her ancestor and can finally take pride in herself, perhaps sparking a more healthy interest in him. Riko and Aria have several characteristics in common: they are short, both have earned Quadra status, both wear their hair in twin-tails, both are the third generation scions of famous ancestors, and lastly, both are romantically interested in Kinji. Her surnames are derived from Lupin III and Fujiko Mine, and she is purportedly their child; for copyright reasons, the identities of her parents are unknown.
Reki (レキ)
Voiced by: Kaori Ishihara (Japanese); Jad Saxton (English)
The Snipe department's ace, Butei rank S. She has no family name and is habitually taciturn, impassive and indifferent to fashion. Kinji later finds out that this, along with her hair color, is due to the influence of large quantities of RiriIrokane in her birthplace. RiriIrokane is Azure Irokane and it bestows the ability to nullify other powers when the subject is calm. However, according to a Hotogi Historical Record it 'hates' human hearts and the princesses of the Ulus (to whom Reki belongs) revere RiriIrokane and offer their 'hearts' to it. She's always seen wearing Sennheiser PMX990 headphones through which she apparently listens to the sound of wind from her homeland (somewhere between Northern Mongolia and Siberia). Her signature quotation is "I am a single bullet. It has no heart. Therefore, it does not think. It just flies straight towards its target", which she always say before she takes a shot. Her sniper skills are so high that she can shoot anything within a 2 km radius without missing her target. Her personal weapon is a SVD (Dragunov Sniper-Rifle) with an attachable bayonet.
In the middle of volume 3, Reki tames a wolf in a matter of 5 minutes, which she later names Haimaki, and trains to be a Butei dog. From then on, she lives together with Haimaki in her room in a girls' dormitory. Kinji has visited her room at least twice up to volume 6 of light novel and has noted how bare and simple it is. Reki also sleeps upright with the Dragunov in her hands, perhaps to prevent an ambush attack according to Kinji. On noting that Reki doesn't possess any clothing other than a number of school uniforms, and as a part of his Lima syndrome plan, Kinji buys her a casual outfit as a present. Reki cleans up nicely; in fact, Kinji was left speechless after witnessing her dressed-up appearance in volume 6.
She plays a minor role in the series, usually providing covering fire for Aria and Kinji when they are fighting at close range or saving them during times of trouble. At the end of volume 5, she holds Kinji at gunpoint on the rooftop of Butei High, kisses him and proposes marriage to him. She also reveals that she already knows about the I-U and Hysteria Mode. Her ancestors are revealed to be Minamoto no Yoshitsune and Genghis Khan. The Ulu tribe she belongs to only gives birth to girls (possibly due to a genetic flaw from being so insular.) Since there are only 47 members of the tribe (counting Reki) there seems to be no need to provide a second name. Her tribe practices a kind of reverse bride kidnapping as their courtship ritual, where the 'bride' kidnaps the 'groom'. Reki pursued Kinji and shot the buttons off of his jacket (without hurting him) at intervals until he 'surrendered' himself to her. As an attempt to 'break up' with her, he tried to get her to undergo Lima syndrome (where a kidnapper falls for victim), but was not completely successful in preventing himself from undergoing Stockholm syndrome (where the victim sympathizes with the kidnapper.) It is hinted that selecting Kinji as her 'husband' was to provide, not only herself, but possibly the 46 other princesses of the Ulus, with strong children as well. Realizing that Reki would likely try to shoot herself as a result of her kidnapping him, Kinji sabotaged her last bullet. After this, Reki started living for herself and her friends (mainly Kinji) in contrast to her earlier habit of living solely for duty and obsessively obeying the 'voice of the wind'.
Apparently, before coming to Butei High, Reki performed "unrecorded" jobs in Russia and China due to her Butei license. In other words, she worked as a "Sweeper".
Jeanne d'Arc (ジャンヌ・ダルク, Jannu Daruku)
Voiced by: Ayako Kawasumi (Japanese); Colleen Clinkenbeard (English)
Jeanne d'Arc XXX (also known as Durandal or Diamond Dust Witch) is an ice ability user from I-U (a criminal organization). During the events in Volume 2 of the light novel, she targets Shirayuki in an attempt to kidnap her and force her to join I-U. She is successfully captured via the combined efforts of Aria, Kinji and Shirayuki during the season of Adseard. As one of the conditions of her plea bargain, she was forced to stay in Butei High as a 2nd year international student from Paris enrolled in the Informa department. As a reliable Informa student, Kinji requests her aid whenever he needs knowledge about a particular case he is involved in. Jeanne and Riko get along with each other very well.
She is one of the few people who knows of Kinji's secret. Her personality is serious and cool. Her first comment about Butei High's uniform skirt is:"Unmarried girls shouldn't openly reveal their legs like this!". However, that notion is pretty much shattered because of Riko's strong influence on her, and she has developed a habit of secretly collecting maid dresses, lolita fashion, and other cute dresses. Due to astigmatism she usually wears contacts to see clearly, but carries a pair of glasses as backup or for reading.
Although Jeanne is quite extraordinary in terms of her beauty, fighting skills, as well as her planning and investigating abilities, her drawing skills are unimpressive:an elementary school student can draw much better than she can. Despite her strength, she alleges that she is the weakest out of all the members of I-U. Her preferred weapon is the Durandal. However, after Shirayuki broke part of it off she had to adjust to the shorter blade. Melting down the whole blade and reforging it as a single piece again was inadvisable as that would severely weaken the integrity of the metal, making it much easier to break. Or in simpler terms, the weakness of the break would be spread to the entire sword.

=== Aria the Scarlet Ammo AA characters ===
Akari Mamiya (間宮 あかり, Mamiya Akari)
Voiced by: Ayane Sakura (Japanese); Madeleine Morris (English)
A female student attending Butei High School in the Assault department who greatly admires Aria that borders on obsessiveness. Akari is typically clumsy and carefree but is known to be protective of her friends. She and her younger sister Nonoka are two of the few survivors of the Mamiya clan, a clan of assassins that operated during the days of the shogunate and specialized instant-kill techniques. In modern Japan however, their techniques and unique poisons are no longer used and are only passed down in order to preserve them but their estate was destroyed, Nonoka was poisoned and their mother Misuzu was presumably killed by Kyouchikytou and the organization IU before the events of the story. Akari joined Butei High School because she wanted to protect and save others instead of killing which is one of the reasons she greatly admires Aria and also why she refuses to use her gun on criminals. However, she is still capable of using her family's techniques if she is forced or if the situation requires it. Despite her background and experiences, Akari is clumsy but cheerful, optimistic and friendly which gains her new friends and even admirers. She uses a Colt M1911 like Aria who takes it from her as part of the Amica test wherein Akari must take to steal it back. She also possesses a 25-round Micro Uzi and tactical knife. She eventually succeeds and becomes Aria's official Amica. She is known to greatly dislike Kinji due to his closeness to Aria and because he admitted to finding her annoying.
Shino Sasaki (佐々木 志乃, Sasaki Shino)
Voiced by: Ai Kayano (Japanese); Amber Lee Connors (English)
A female student attending Butei High School in the Inquesta department who comes from the wealthy and prestigious Sasaki family and is descended from Sasaki Kojirō. Like her ancestor she is a practitioner of the Ganryū sword style and can even use Kojirō's famous Swallow Cut technique. She first met Akari at a food stand where they share a leaf pie. She has since developed an obsessive crush on Akari to the point that she is willing to resort to violence in order to make Akari break off her amica relationship with Aria who she is extremely jealous of. She is also known to stalk Akari and take candid pictures of her changing or in a swimsuit. She later becomes Shirayuki Hotogi's amica after Shino passes her test and Shirayuki senses her strong feelings. Ironically, the two share similar traits:both have the appearance and grace of a yamato nadeshiko but their appearances belie their great skills as swordswomen, their mutual dislike and jealousy of Aria, they both come from influential families, they both harbor strong feelings for someone and they both have yandere-like tendencies. Shino prefers to use a standard katana in battle but she also possesses an ōdachi called the Monohoshizao like her ancestor's.
Raika Hino (火野 ライカ, Hino Raika)
Voiced by: M.A.O (Japanese); Kristi Kang (English)
A female student attending Butei High School who has known Akari since middle school. Tall, highly athletic and skilled in battle yet somewhat tomboyish, Raika is greatly admired by both men and women alike especially by her amica Kirin Shima although some boys insult her tomboyish behavior which she takes to heart. Despite this, Raika secretly loves cute and feminine things such as stuffed toys and dresses, a secret that is later discovered by Kirin and Akari. Raika favors close quarters combat in battle.
Kirin Shima (島 麒麟, Shima Kirin)
Voiced by: Aoi Yūki (Japanese); Monica Rial (English)
A female student attending Butei Middle School in the CVR department's Division 2 who admires Raika and applies to become her amica. Despite Raika's initial refusal she eventually accepts Kirin. She was previously the amica of Riko Mine but after the 1 year amica period expired, Kirin searched for a new partner and found the qualities she desired in Raika. Like Riko, Kirin also customized her uniform into a Gothic Lolita style which, aside from being her preference and being used to tease and tempt Raika, is used to conceal weapons. Kirin possesses a childish personality and appearance, even more so than Riko, but this belies her crafty and manipulative side which is common among students of the CVR division. Kirin is adept at hand to hand combat.
Urara Takachiho (高千穂 麗, Takachiho Urara)
Voiced by: Sarah Emi Bridcutt (Japanese); Sara Ragsdale (English)
A female student attending Butei High School in the Assault department. She is the proud heiress of the Takachiho Family, a household of armed lawyers. Her father and Shino Sasaki's father are said to be enemies in court. She appears very dignified, and is always seen with Yuyu and Yaya, a pair of twins that are her servants. Her wealth and status fuel her confidence level quite high, and she uses it to obtain many things that she wishes for. She likes being in control of situations and people. Despite her acting high and mighty, deep down, she cares and means well for the ones she cares about. In the anime, she is initially shown to look down on Akari and is jealous of her due to her succeeding in becoming Aria's amica while Urara herself failed though the matter with Aria is not present in the manga. She later befriends Akari and develops a rivalry with Shino over Akari's friendship. In the anime, she uses a Ruger Super Redhawk with an extended barrel and a rifle stock and a rapier.
Yaya Aizawa (愛沢 夜夜, Aizawa Yaya)
Voiced by: Chinami Hashimoto (Japanese); Steph Garrett (English)
A female student attending Butei High School in the Assault department. Always by her side with her twin sister, Yuyu Aizawa, they follow Urara Takachiho as her sidekick servants. She wears a white single-sided headphone-like headband with her hiragana character 'や' on the earpod. She uses an Ingram Model 11.
Yuyu Aizawa (愛沢 湯湯, Aizawa Yuyu)
Voiced by: Momo Asakura (Japanese); Lynsey Hale (English)
A female student attending Butei High School in the Assault department. Always by her side with her twin sister, Yaya Aizawa, they follow Urara Takachiho as her sidekick servants. Like Yaya, she wears a white single-sided headphone-like headband but with her hiragana character 'ゆ' on the earpod. She uses an Ingram Model 10.
Kyouchikytou (夾竹桃, Kyouchikutou)
Voiced by: Yui Horie (Japanese); Alex Moore (English)
A female member of the organization IU. Along with Jeanne d'Arc, she was smuggled into Tokyo Butei High School with Mine Riko's help. Much like Riko, she has a rather short stature and often dresses in Gothic Lolita fashion. Kyou is very reserved and quiet. She is a genius tactician and knows how to cover her tracks. In one instance she sent an entire work complex crumbling down on Akari and her friends with a very intricate Rube Goldberg machine that, in the end, could only be ruled as a freak accident due to the nature of the sabotage. She and the other members of IU attacked the Mamiya clan's estate during which she poisoned Akari's younger sister Nonoka which would ultimately cause her to lose her vision two years before the beginning of the story. She later reappears and offers Akari the antidote to Nonoka's poison in exchange for the Mamiya clan's secret technique the Takamakuri which she believes is a unique poison. She is eventually defeated and captured by Aria and Akari. Her preferred weapon is poison which she claims to possess 83 different kinds. She also uses wires and an M134 Minigun. In the anime, she has an older sister named Suimitsutou.
Nonoka Mamiya (間宮 ののか, Mamiya Nonoka)
Voiced by: Inori Minase (Japanese); Marla Acevedo (English)
She is Akari's younger sister and a middle school Student and one of the few non-antagonistic characters who do not attend Butei High School. Unlike Akari, Nonoka is mature for her age; she does the housework and wakes Akari up every morning. Like Akari, she is also the object of Shino Sasaki's crush. Two years before the events of the story, her family's estate was attacked and destroyed by IU and she herself was poisoned by Kyouchikytou which would cause her to slowly lose her eyesight. Her condition worsens during the events of the story but she is eventually cured by Akari who defeats Kyouchikytou with Aria's help.

=== Tokyo Butei High ===
==== Students ====
Hina Fuuma (風魔 陽菜, Fūma Hina)
Voiced by: Ayaka Imamura (Japanese); Morgan Garrett (English)
Kinji's underclassman. A Lezzad freshman, enrolled in class 1-C, she has her black hair usually pony-tailed in the back. She also wears a long muffler around the neck, a Fundoshi for underwear, and appears in traditional ninja garb. She is rumored to be a descendant of a famous ninja lineage (presumably decedents of Fūma Kotarō).
When they were in middle school together, she and Kinji sparred. At that time, Kinji happened to be in Hysteria Mode and he subdued Fuuma like a child. Ever since then, she greatly respects Kinji and calls him "Master". She works part-time in order to pay for her tuition as well as to make ends meet, which she refers to as "training". She is Kinji's Amica, which is when a Junior (Kinji) or Senior acts like a big brother/sister for a freshman (Fuuma) and essentially shows them the ropes about various things whether it is skills, state of mind for situations, training methods, nuggets of experience, etc.
Goki Muto (武藤 剛気, Mutō Gōki)
Voiced by: Takayuki Kondō (Japanese); Ricco Fajardo (English)
The Logi's ace with a 190 cm height and pointy hair. Kinji considers him as a transportation geek. This is due to his extensive knowledge of various vehicles whether it be on land, sea or air. He is a skilled driver who can operate anything from a car to a nuclear submarine. His personal weapon is a Colt Python Revolver that uses .357 magnum bullets which he chose solely for ease of maintenance, as despite the astounding firepower, the gun's loading capacity is small, the accuracy is horrible and it cannot equip a suppressor, so normally, no Butei would use it. Goki has feelings for Shirayuki. He is also a shameless pervert.
Ryo Shiranui (不知火 亮, Shiranui Ryō)
Voiced by: Takuya Eguchi (Japanese); Chris Cason (English)
A bright, handsome and popular guy. Enrolled in Assault, and in the same class as Kinji, his Butei level is A. Even though there are different aspects involved in an A ranking, his integration capacity is high; his barehanded, dagger handling or shooting aspects can all be relied upon. The reliability of his gun is very high, a Mk. 23 MOD 0 with an installed laser aiming lens. He is also a rare polite person in Butei High. Even though he is very popular with girls, he never had a girlfriend before. He is Kinji and Muto's close friend. In past, during Kinji's days in Assault, they were often teammates. Kinji considers him a good friend and someone to rely on; an example of a polite and elegant student.
Aya Hiraga (平賀 文, Hiraga Aya)
A genius of the Amdo department, she is enlisted by other students to upgrade or modify their weapons although, according to Kinji, her labor fees are considerably expensive. Kinji's Beretta pistol is one such example. Despite being a genius in customizing weapons, sometimes, due to sloppy work, the guns she has worked on malfunction, as seen when Kinji's Beretta, modified to fire three-round bursts, stops working and instead fires 2 bullets almost at the same time. Her ancestor is Hiraga Gennai.
Kinji has stated that considering her skills, she should be ranked S. However, due to the massive fees she charges for her services, coupled with the large number of illegal modifications she performs, she is A-ranked. Her appearance is that of a child, her hair is length is below the ear, and she is widely known in Butei High for watching anime as she tinkers through Butei guns and weapons.
Misaki Nakasorachi (中空知 美咲, Nakasorachi Misaki)
Voiced by: Hisako Kanemoto (Japanese); Jamie Marchi (English)
A second year student from Connect, she specializes in providing real-time intelligence to Buteis that are operating in the field. Her instructions are always crystal clear, and Kinji claims that she has a voice worthy of a NHK news broadcaster. She also possess an incredible sense of hearing and is able to deduce the location of the sound of wind which Reki always listens to through hearing alone. However, she is shown to be extremely timid when she is off-duty and has trouble interacting with people without the use of some kind of communication device, which is probably why she is ranked B despite her talents. She became friends with Jeanne when she was forced to transfer to Butei High and shared a dormitory apartment with her.

==== Teachers ====
Yutori Takamagahara (高天原 ゆとり, Takamagahara Yutori)
Voiced by: Mai Nakahara (Japanese); Monica Rial (original series), Tia Ballard (AA) (English)
Homeroom teacher for Class 2-A and the head of department for Inquesta. Described as a "Butei High's kind teacher", she seems to be one of the few non-violent teachers depicted in the series, but she has actually a past as a vicious mercenary nicknamed "Bloody Yutori".
Umeko Tsuzuri (綴 梅子, Tsuzuri Umeko)
Voiced by: Masumi Asano (Japanese); Erica Harte (English)
Homeroom teacher for Class 2-B and head of department for Dagula. An expert in interrogation techniques, she is capable of extracting confessions from the toughest offenders. She is apparently one of the top five interrogators in Japan. She has a habit of smoking hand-rolled cigarettes, even in the vicinity of students. Wields a Glock 18.
Ranbyou (蘭豹, Ranbyō)
An Assault department instructor, she is known to be a very violent teacher, earning her the nickname of "Human Bunker Buster". Her catchphrases are "Go die!" or "Death!". Rumored to be connected with the Hong Kong triads. She was the teacher that took the group photograph for Team Baskerville during their formation ceremony in volume 7 of the light novels.
Tōru Sayonaki (小夜鳴 徹, Sayonaki Tōru)
Voiced by: Kenji Nojima (Japanese); J. Michael Tatum (English)
A geneticist who works as a part-time instructor for the Ambulance department, he is a university graduate from abroad and is noted to be very handsome with an appearance of a 20-year-old. He is very polite, using honorific speech at all times, which contributed to his immense popularity in Butei High. It turns out he was the one who had captured and imprisoned Riko after her parents died. He was seeking Lupin's superior genetic material to add to his collection (possibly himself as well,) but, as it seemed she was severely lacking in talent and ability, he treated her as a worthless failure. This entailed abuse, long stretches of being locked in a cell covered in dirt with nothing to do but sit, and constant comments on how she was a failure while she was still dealing with her parents' deaths.
In truth, this identity is an outer shell that Vlad created from the genetic material (DNA) that Vlad had absorbed through centuries of drinking blood. This is similar to an insect's memesis where not only does an 'invader' look like the species its invading, but also 'acts' like a member of the species. Toru can summon Vlad, who takes the form of a large wolf-like creature, but only when Sayonaki feels an extreme emotion. Vlad is otherwise dormant while the split personality, Sayonaki, retains control and handles the day-to-day matters. Due to his centuries of experiences Sayonaki is no longer able to get emotionally stimulated enough to summon Vlad by normal means. However, by somehow imprinting himself with a version of Kinichi Tohyama's Hysteria Savant Syndrome he's able to use it to awaken Vlad. The difference is that Sayonaki's version isn't triggered by arousal, like Kinji's, but by the sadistic pleasure he derives from abusing 'lesser species.' Being a proud and ancient vampire this means anything weaker than a vampire is considered a lesser species with humanity holding the position of 'weak prey.' Thus, he and Vlad are able to abuse cute girls, like Riko, without Hysteria mode hindering them because their protective instinct (assuming they have any) would only apply to cute, female vampires, not humans. Vlad tells Kinji that this is similar to how he (Kinji) wouldn't be able to enter Hysteria mode if he saw a female Chimpanzee being abused. Vlad has also somehow modified his howl to interrupt Kinji's Hysteria mode.
Vlad has the ability to quickly heal his own wounds and proved to be a difficult opponent for Riko, Aria and Kinji. However, Vlad was finally captured by the trio when all 4 of his weak points (marked by eye-shaped symbols from a Vatican Paladin's spell) were shot at the same time causing crippling damage. However, the fact that both Vlad and Sayonaki share the same body was kept secret. This may be due to conditions of the plea bargain that Kinji and Aria had to agree to lest they go to jail for larceny (although considering they were 'recovering' stolen property for the rightful owner [Riko], this is more likely the government's overreaction over any information dealing with I-U.)

=== Corto ===
Lisa Ave du Ank (リサ・アヴェ・デュ・アンク, Risa Avue deyu Anku)
Voiced by: Emiri Iwai
Minuet Holmes (メヌエット・ホームズ, Menuetto Hōmuzu)
Voiced by: Miyari Nemoto
Nemo Rinkarun (ニモりんかるん)
Voiced by: Anzu Haruno

==== Others ====
Kikuyo Kagataka (鏡高 菊代, Kagataka Kikuyo)
Head of the illegal Yakuza group, Kagataka. Due to her father's death she inherited the head of the group. She was Kinji's friend when he was studying in Kanagawa Butei Junior High and among the few who knew about Kinji's Hysteria Mode and used it to make Kinji her slave and which is why Kinji disliked women. After the group disbanded, she enrolled into Tokyo Butei High and a member of both Lezzad and Daugula department.
Moe Mochizuki (望月 萌, Mochizuki Moe)
Class representative of Higashi Ikebukuro High School and friend of Kinji when he was forced to transfer school with Reki. At volume 13 She messaged Kinji that she considered being a Butei and enrolled into Tokyo Butei High and a member of Ambulace department.
The Golden Cross (Gの血族)
The inheritance of genes from their father, Konza Tohyama, which consist of Kinji, Kinichi, Kinzo, and Kaname.
Kinichi Tōyama (遠山欽一, Tōyama Kin'ichi)
Brother of Kinji and a member of the criminal organization 'I.U'. Like Kinji, he possesses the Tohyama genetic trait of Hysteria Mode, although his term for it is H.S.S. Is able to sustain Hysteria mode for over a day at a time, but due to the immense stress on the body has to sleep for days. To self-trigger Hysteria Mode Kinichi crossdresses as an ideal beauty while going by the name Kana. Kana is Kinichi's version of Kinji's personality shift when going into Hysteria Mode. Like Kinji, Kinichi knows and remembers everything Kana does and vice versa. Also, like Kinji Kinichi gets extremely embarrassed about his actions in Hysteria Mode when switched back to normal mode. Six months prior to the first chapter of "Aria the Scarlet Ammo" Kinichi saved everybody on a cruise ship before disappearing as the latest victim of the Butei Killer. He never contacted Kinji during that time until Riko arranges a meeting after the confrontation with Vlad. As a result of Kinichi's disappearing, the mass of hate mail blaming Kinichi for the ship incident, and Kana asking Kinji for help killing Aria upon meeting again (breaking Article 1 of the Butei Code which Kinichi had strictly adhered to in the past,) has destroyed all of Kinji's interest in being a Butei causing him to wish for a normal life and considering Hysteria Mode a curse. Currently Kinichi seems to be in a relationship with Patra, but declared himself unaffiliated rather than siding with Deen or Grenada during the Bandire much to Patra's disappointment.
Kaname Tōyama (遠山要, Tōyama Kaname)
Sister of Kinji. During the questioning on the bus she mentions that she has Caucasian mixed in her lineage, but other than that hasn't explained her parentage other than being Kinji's sister. In the facility she was raised in as a super soldier she was only referred to by her serial number G-IV (Generation four.) She never had a name until Kinji gave her the name Kaname which is Kana plus the Japanese character for girl. Is obsessive over Kinji and wants all his affection for herself resulting in extreme jealous outbursts whenever another girl gets close to him. Such as carving "traitor" into concrete with her fingers when she spies him with Watson dressed up as a girl. Due to extreme training at the facility she is able to shrug off the pain from being her bulletproof clothing being shot with a magnum. (Bulletproof clothing prevents the bullet from penetrating, but the force of the bullet is turned into severe blunt force trauma which really hurts.) Weapon of choice is mono-filament vibrosword called Sonic. (Ie the edge is one molecule thick allowing it to cut everything and the whole sword vibrates.)
Kinzo Tōyama (遠山金蔵, Tōyama Kinzō)
Brother of Kinji.

== Media ==
=== Light novels ===
Aria the Scarlet Ammo is a light novel series written by Chūgaku Akamatsu, with illustrations by Kobuichi. Media Factory published the first novel on August 25, 2008, under their MF Bunko J imprint. As of June 2026, 45 main novels have been released. A spin-off novel, Aria the Scarlet Ammo Reloaded, was published on December 25, 2012. A light novel adaptation of Aria the Scarlet Ammo AA was published in four volumes in 2015. The first two novels were published in English digitally by Digital Manga in 2013 and 2014.

| No. | Title | Original release date | English release date |
|---|---|---|---|
| 1 | Aria the Scarlet Ammo; Hidan no Aria (緋弾のアリア) | August 25, 2008; 978-4-8401-2401-0 | August 28, 2013; 978-1-6131-3642-3 |
Kinji Tohyama is a boy plagued by Hysteria Savant Syndrome, a condition that runs in his family which enhances their members when they're aroused. He has always wanted to give up being a Butei (Armed Detective) for a normal teenage life. All chance of this goes out the window when he gets caught up in a bike bombing by the Butei Killer. He is saved by a girl who fell from the sky, later transferring to his class and introducing herself as Aria Holmes Kanzaki. Apparently, she intends for Kinji to become her "slave".
| 2 | Aria the Scarlet Ammo II: Blazing Diamond Dust; Hidan no Aria II Moeru Ginhyō (緋弾のアリアII 燃える銀氷（ダイヤモンドダスト）) | December 25, 2008; 978-4-8401-2600-7 | May 22, 2014; 978-1-6131-3724-6 |
Adseard (Butei Olympics) is fast approaching, and Butei High is currently in a flurry. A rumor about a kidnapper named Durandal has the Masters worried that Shirayuki Hotogi, Butei High's ace, might be abducted. Hearing this, Aria volunteers to become Shirayuki's bodyguard. As he is her partner, she drags Kinji into the mission.
| 3 | Aria the Scarlet Ammo III: Honey Trap; Hidan no Aria III Hachimitsu-iro no Wana (緋弾のアリアIII 蜂蜜色の罠（ハニー・トラップ）) | March 25, 2009; 978-4-8401-2720-2 | — |
Riko comes to Kinji and Aria, requesting their help. An item she holds dear has been stolen from her by the #2 of an organization known as IU, and stored in a mansion somewhere in Yokohama. Riko makes a deal with the duo, promising to testify for Aria's mom if they infiltrate the mansion and reclaim her treasure. As they attempt this, her tragic past and her fear of it are revealed to them.
| 4 | Aria the Scarlet Ammo IV: Fall of the Scarlet Ammo; Hidan no Aria IV Ochita Hidan (緋弾のアリアIV 堕ちた緋弾（スカーレット）) | August 25, 2009; 978-4-8401-2873-5 | — |
Kinji's brother, who was thought to have died half a year ago, appeared in front of him asking for his assistance in assassinating Aria. Stuck between relative and partner he finally gathers his resolution to go up against him. At the moment of Kinji's defeat, he awakens, realizing that he had fallen asleep in front of his PC. Even if it was just a strange nightmare, it leaves fear in his heart, causing him to fear for his partner.
| 5 | Aria the Scarlet Ammo V: Overture's Fine; Hidan no Aria V Jokyoku no Shūshisen (緋弾のアリアV 序曲の終止線（プレリュード・フィーネ）) | December 25, 2009; 978-4-8401-3126-1 | — |
The mysterious leader of IU has finally made his move, abducting Aria. Kinji goes alone to rescue his partner. Behind enemy lines, the secret of the Scarlet Ammo is finally revealed to him. Now he faces his toughest challenge yet, a face off with IU's leader, to settle matters with the organization once and for all.
| 6 | Aria the Scarlet Ammo VI: Killing Range 2051; Hidan no Aria VI Zettai Hankei 2051 (緋弾のアリアVI 絶対半径（キリングレンジ）2051) | April 23, 2010; 978-4-8401-3281-7 | — |
On the last day of August, Reki appears to Kinji on the rooftop, aiming her Dragunov at him. She demands his hand in marriage and threatens him to stay away from Aria. Held prisoner by her weapon, he is forced to spend weeks cohabiting with Reki. With a field trip coming up, Kinji must use the time to persuade her to free him. But it seems there is more behind her marriage than what he thinks.
| 7 | Aria the Scarlet Ammo VII: Castling Turn; Hidan no Aria VII Hi to Kaze no Embu (緋弾のアリアVII 火と風の円舞（キャスリング・ターン）) | August 25, 2010; 978-4-8401-3486-6 | — |
After the field trip, the gang head back to Tokyo. Unfortunately, it would seem someone has planted a bomb on the bullet train they're traveling in. Not only will the bomb explode if the train's speed is decreased, but they must increase the speed by 10 km/h every 3 minutes or it will explode. Even worse, Riko deduces that the culprit is still onboard the train! This mission calls for Kinji, Aria, Riko, Shirayuki and the other Butei to disarm the bomb and save the passengers. But they've only got 80 minutes until they reach Tokyo.
| 8 | Aria the Scarlet Ammo VIII: Tornado High; Hidan no Aria VIII Rasen no Tenkūki (緋弾のアリアVIII 螺旋の天空樹（トルネード・ハイ）) | December 24, 2010; 978-4-8401-3678-5 | — |
Following IU's collapse, some of the world's most powerful secret organizations meet up on Empty Island for the Bandire, a conference to ally with either Deen or Grenada in the upcoming Far Eastern Warfare (FEW). Despite just being a Butei team, Team Baskerville is forced to choose a side as Kinji and Aria were partly responsible for IU's fate. To add to his problems, Butei High's preparations for the Cultural Festival come with a transfer student calling himself "L" Watson, who seems to have trouble in store for Kinji.
| 9 | Aria the Scarlet Ammo IX: Spark Out; Hidan no Aria IX Aoki Senkō (緋弾のアリアIX 蒼き閃光（スパーク・アウト）) | March 25, 2011; 978-4-8401-3859-8 | — |
After learning the secret of Elle Watson and saving Aria from her, Kinji faces an attack from Vlad's daughter Hilda, the Spark Witch who extracted five of the "Seven Stars of the Golden Shell" from Aria's body. The power she wields might even exceed that of her father's. When Riko gets thrown into the frey, the three man team who beat Vlad must pull out all the stops to overpower this foe.
| 10 | Aria the Scarlet Ammo X: Arcanum Duo; Hidan no Aria X Kinki no Sōkyoku (緋弾のアリアX 禁忌の双極（アルカナム・デュオ）) | July 25, 2011; 978-4-8401-3969-4 | — |
Things seem to be going well. Hilda was defeated without casualties, one of the five stars has been recovered, and the Cultural Festival was actually successful. Unfortunately, this streak of fortune ends here. The four girls of Team Baskerville have been savagely beaten by GIII, a violent neutral in the Far Eastern Warfare, and his subordinate GIV.
| 11 | Aria the Scarlet Ammo XI: Collateral Bros; Hidan no Aria XI G no Ketsuzoku (緋弾のアリアXI Gの血族（コラテラル・ブロス）) | December 22, 2011; 978-4-8401-4331-8 | — |
Kinji has managed to acquire some info on GIII. This enemy and his GIII League are mighty enough to stand alone in the Far Eastern Warfare. Now that they're targeting him, Kinji finds himself up against one of the seven R-Rank Butei in the world, and he's much closer to Kinji than the boy could've imagined.
| 12 | Aria the Scarlet Ammo XII: Fall Oblige; Hidan no Aria XII Ookami Inu ni furu Yuki (緋弾のアリアXII 狼狗に降る雪（フォル・オブリージュ）) | May 25, 2012; 978-4-8401-4579-4 | — |
After longing for it for some time, Kinji is finally able to transfer out of Butei High to a normal school, with an over attached Reki tagging along. He even manages to make a normal friend in Moe Mochizuki. But this average life is short lived as his new friend is taken hostage by the Kagataka Family Syndicate.
| 13 | Aria the Scarlet Ammo XIII: Kowloon Reverse; Hidan no Aria XIII Hangeki no Kyuryu (緋弾のアリアXIII 反撃の九龍（ガウロン・リバース）) | August 24, 2012; 978-4-8401-4682-1 | — |
Atop the roof of the Kagataka Family Mansion, GIII, the seemingly unmatchable foe whom brought Team Baskerville devastation, was taken out in one attack. The assailant is Kou, Ranpan's secret weapon. As the organization flee back to Hong Kong, Kinji abandons his quest for a "normal life" and returns to his team in Butei High. No longer content with awaiting Grenada's next attack, he eggs the team on to strike first and attack Ranpan in Hong Kong. For Kinji this is personal, for not only did they injure his younger brother, but Ranpan also holds one of the seven Karagane shells needed to save Aria's future.
| | Aria the Scarlet Ammo Reloaded: Castoff Table; Hidan no Aria Rirōdeddo Kyasutoofu Tēburu (緋弾のアリア リローデッド キャストオフ・テーブル) | December 25, 2012; 978-4-8401-4932-7 | — |
Included with the limited edition BD/DVD volumes of the anime, this a collection of seven short stories set around Summer Break. Riko has coerced Kinji and the girls into a playing a series of games. There's a catch to these games however, and it seems to spell trouble for Kinji.
| 14 | Aria the Scarlet Ammo XIV: Aquamarine Kreuz; Hidan no Aria XIV Manekarezaru Kaimu (緋弾のアリアXIV 招かれざる海霧（アクアマリン・クロイツ）) | April 25, 2013; 978-4-8401-5161-0 | — |
Kou might be Ranpan's most powerful, but she seems to be a sweet girl. In reality, it is the consciousness she shares with Fighting Buddha God Sun Wukong which makes her so violent and dangerous. She tries to hold Sun back but Ranpan force it to take control when needed, using a special key made by Patra. Kinji sets out to save Kou by attenuating Sun so only Kou can control her body, thus enabling a potential end to the conflict with Ranpan. But things take an odd turn when senior Ranpan member Seigen Shokatsu approaches him and the girls of Baskerville for negotiations at Ranpan Castle.
| 15 | Aria the Scarlet Ammo XV: Constellation; Hidan no Aria XV (緋弾のアリアXV 哿と銀氷（コンステラシオン）) | August 25, 2013; 978-4-8401-5283-9 | — |
Ranpan is overpowered in a representative duel with Kinji. But the battlefield that Hong Kong has become only gets more dangerous following this victory. The Witch of Cursed Water and former Commander-in-Chief of IU Katze Grasse, and the terrorists known as Regiment Hex, make a dangerous move. An oil tanker anchored in Victoria Bay is hijacked, placing the city of Hong Kong in danger. Now its up to Kinji, Aria, and their allies to avert disaster and save countless lives.
| 16 | Aria the Scarlet Ammo XVI: Gevaudan; Hidan no Aria XVI (緋弾のアリアXVI 星の砦の秂狼（ジェヴォーダン）) | December 25, 2013; 978-4-04-066156-8 | — |
Regiment Hex, a terrorist organization with ties to one of history's greatest evils. With great struggle, Kinji managed to prevent their initial attack from ending in catastrophe. But now, the European frontline is about to be absorbed by the flames of all-out war. In the midst of all this, suspicions amongst his team bring Kinji trouble, all coming to a head when he runs into the cowardly soldier who fled the fighting, a werewolf girl named Lisa.
| 17 | Aria the Scarlet Ammo XVII: Recitativo; Hidan no Aria XVII (緋弾のアリアXVII 緋弾の叙唱（レチタティーヴォ）) | April 25, 2014; 978-4-04-066717-1 | — |
The Far East Warfare nears its conclusion, as Kinji and his allies set their sights on a final confrontation with Regiment Hex and Grenada. With two more Karagane shells on the line, the boy gives everything he's got to bring peace to both the world, and his partner. But unbeknownst to him, another deadly opponent looms behind the scenes, and this ominous darkness is all too familiar with the Tohyama family.
| 18 | Aria the Scarlet Ammo XVIII: Trans-Am; Hidan no Aria XVIII (緋弾のアリアXVIII 星条旗の覇道（トランザム）) | August 25, 2014; 978-4-04-066954-0 | — |
The world is in a delicate position following the Far Eastern Warfare, and so is Aria's life. The "Scarlet Blazing God" within her is on the verge of fully awakening and throwing the world into a new supernatural war. As she gains strength from love, Kinji and Aria are to be separated, with Aria being sent off to meet her sister Minuet in London. GIII contacts Kinji for help in storming Area 51 to find the Ruruirokane, another form of Irokane which can suppress the Hihiirokane. One problem, a fellow Genion, codenamed RIII, is guarding the legendary metal. And this obstacle boasts power far beyond GIII's.
| 19 | Aria the Scarlet Ammo XIX: Together with Minuet; Hidan no Aria XIX (緋弾のアリアXIX 小舞曲を御一緒に（メヌエット）) | December 25, 2014; 978-4-04-067314-1 | — |
Supporedly, Aria's sister Minuet is currently the only free person who knows the information needed to save Aria from the Scarlet Ammo's influence. The girl resides in London and has a unique power which she was forced to rely on during a sad moment in her past. With her knowledge and deductive capability, she could be a valuable ally. But for Kinji, who'd pleaded for the Ruruirokane's help, a Ririirokane possessed Reki by his side, nothing is ever that simple. As to be expected, a form of violent opposition awaits in the UK.
| 20 | Aria the Scarlet Ammo XX: Superconductivity; Hidan no Aria XX (緋弾のアリアXX 恋と戦の超伝導（スーパーコンダクティビティ）) | May 25, 2015; 978-4-04-067612-8 | — |
Thought deceased, Sherlock Holmes "reunites" with Kinji, as did Kou of Ranpan. With the kinokuni Oni of the Republic of Palau making their next move, and challenge the troubled boy. With those closest to the Scarlet Irokane congregated in one area, the Scarlet Goddess moves to fully restore its form. Time is running out, and with Aria at stake, Kinji must win this battle, or lose his partner.
| 21 | Aria the Scarlet Ammo XXI: Rigorous Suspect; Hidan no Aria XXI (緋弾のアリアXXI 秋霜烈日の獅子（リゴラス・サスペクト）) | August 25, 2015; 978-4-04-067750-7 | — |
The Scarlet Goddess is now whole, and Aria is her vessel. Fueled by love and war, even the Hotogi Shrine maidens could only prolong her awakening. Despite his best efforts and many hard-fought battles, Kinji was unable to prevent this tragedy. But the boy still perseveres. With Shirayuki's help, the man who can make the impossible, possible, aims to defuse this threat without killing their friend. And as the boy determines, the best option to victory, is to make the Goddess fall for him.
| 22 | Aria the Scarlet Ammo XXII: Anonymous Death; Hidan no Aria XXII (緋弾のアリアXXII 彗星よ白昼夢に眠れ（アノニマス・デス）) | April 25, 2016; 978-4-04-068011-8 | — |
Finally, after all the violence and strife, the war over the Irokane reaches its conclusion, and Aria, having taken on the Scarlet Goddess' power, is free of the supernatural metal's burden. With all of the convoluted conspiracy wrapped up and done away with, Aria's mother is finally cleared of all crimes and released from her imprisonment. The world now restored to a peaceful state, all of Kinji's friends and classmates have high hopes for their futures. While Kinji himself, does not. As he struggles with what he'll do next, now that his life is battle-free, the boy is arrested for murder. Whatever's going on, familiar faces like Shiranui and the Demon Blade duo seem to be involved.
| 23 | Aria the Scarlet Ammo XXIII: Unknown Bullet; Hidan no Aria XXIII (緋弾のアリアXXIII 不可知の銃弾（ゼロ・インフィニット）) | August 25, 2016; 978-4-04-068600-4 | — |
Public Division 0, a reformed Japanese secret police force, took Kinji in for crimes he did not commit. Their true intent, to recruit so-called "Enable" for his skills. An organization known as N, claiming power beyond anything Kinji's ever faced, has arisen with plans to stir up new war. Amongst their ranks is Makiri Ito, a traitor to Public Division 0 and Kinji's father's killer. With such a personal enemy targeting him and magazine reporter Hibari Yamane caught in the middle, Kinji must make a life-changing decision.
| 24 | Aria the Scarlet Ammo XXIV: Reunion Alumni Association; Hidan no Aria XXIV (緋弾のアリアXXIV 狂逸の同窓会（イ・ウー・リユニオン）) | December 23, 2016; 978-4-04-068772-8 | — |
Beretta Beretta, a student of Rome Butei High and a gunsmith from Fabbrica D'Armi Pietro Beretta Company, captures Kinji. She's apparently responsible for the loan he received during his struggle with Ranpan, and now she seeks a form of repayment from him. With N targeting him to return the world to a state of war and many powerful figures converging in Rome, Kinji's survival depends on his luck and his friends.
| 25 | Aria the Scarlet Ammo XXV: The Legend of the Scarlet Star; Hidan no Aria XXV (緋弾のアリアXXV 羅馬の軍神星（イル・マルテ・ディ・ローマ）) | April 25, 2017; 978-4-04-069183-1 | — |
Throughout his adventures, Kinji's racked up many astonishing accomplishments, and lived up to the nickname "Enable", the man who can make the impossible, possible. But now, a fighter has entered Rome to engage him in batitle, who can overturn this name. Kinji's self-proclaimed "opposite number", Admiral Nemo of N is "Disenable", the woman who can make the impossible, impossible. Her power on par with Aria's, her appearance triggers the duo's toughest challenge yet.
| 26 | Aria the Scarlet Ammo XXVI: Dark Penetration; Hidan no Aria XXVI (緋弾のアリアXXVI 闇穿つ大蛇（アナコンダ）) | September 25, 2017; 978-4-04-069397-2 | — |
Expelled from Rome Butei High, Kinji is at risk of losing possession of his Butei License and thus, his arms. With N gunning for his head, being caught unarmed is a gamble he can't afford to take. A loophole in the system would allow Kinji to retain his license for at least 3 years should he head a militant company. Thus, the Tohyama Warrior Office starts up. The difficulty of the business world bearing down on him, the dropout's troubles have only just begun. As always, turmoil and violence lie on the horizon.
| 27 | Aria the Scarlet Ammo XXVII: N Hidan no Aria XXVII (緋弾のアリアXXVII 那由多の弾奏) | January 25, 2018; 978-4-04-069607-2 | — |
Turning the role of Tohyama Warrior Office President over to retired Butei Misaki Nakasorachi, Kinji has managed to retain legal access to arms. Just because he can defend himself from N, doesn't mean things will get any easier for him. Having escaped from a lab in Los Alamos, the vessel of the Reverse Irokane, codenamed GV, appears before Kinji. Like GIII and GIV, she is his genetic younger sister, created to oppose those with power close to deities. Naming her Kanade Tohyama, Kinji seeks to remove the Reverse Irokane from her, whilst taking care of her. Of course, this is no simple task, escalating into a large-scale conflict involving the five Tohyama siblings and a military conspiracy.
| 28 | Aria the Scarlet Ammo XXVIII: Coral Reef of Unexpected Island; Hidan no Aria XXVIII (緋弾のアリアXXVIII 絶島の珊瑚礁) | May 25, 2018; 978-4-04-069863-2 | — |
Stranded on an abandoned Island near the South Sea, enemies Kinji and Admiral Nemo Rinkarun are isolated from their allies, the rest of society, and resources integral for survival. In order to escape the severe, yet extremely awkward dilemma with their lives, the two must put aside their differences and work together. In the process, they grow closer, and Nemo falls in love with Kinji.
| 29 | Aria the Scarlet Ammo XXIX: The Shadow Lord's Pact-Espionage; Hidan no Aria XXIX (緋弾のアリアXXIX 盟約の諜侯) | August 25, 2018; 978-4-04-065096-8 | — |
Returning from his odd living arrangement with Nemo, Kinji is reunited with the girls of Team Baskerville and tasked by Public Division 0 with investigating the all girls school, the Agnes Institute. Apparently, an agent of N named "Hydra" is hiding amongst the students. In order to proceed with the infiltration, Kinji assumes his crossdressing alter-ego Clomaetel Belmondo, and befriends class President Misery Adachi. Unfortunately, Hydra's stealth skills are making things difficult and, as Kinji prolongs his stay at the school, he dodges more than a few bullets in maintaining his disguise.
| 30 | Aria the Scarlet Ammo XXX: Chasing the Melancholy; Hidan no Aria XXX (緋弾のアリアXXX 茉莉花を追え) | December 25, 2018; 978-4-04-065387-7 | — |
Konza Tohyama, supposedly deceased father of the Tohyama Siblings, is actually alive, and Makiri Ito, his supposed killer, knows more. Apparently, the former Armed-Prosecutor is hiding in America, currently under contract to assassinate Nemo. In order to find their father and prevent him from committing such a violent act, Kinji and GIII, accompanied by Kinji's Amica Hina Fuuma, travel to America. As to be expected, their travels don't go as planned and the unique trio must battle to reach their goal.
| 31 | Aria the Scarlet Ammo XXXI: Silent Demon; Hidan no Aria XXXI (緋弾のアリアXXXI 静かなる鬼) | June 25, 2019; 978-4-04-065794-3 | — |
| 32 | Aria the Scarlet Ammo XXXII Aria the Scarlet Ammo; Hidan no Aria XXXII (緋弾のアリアXXXII 蒼穹の密使) | December 25, 2019; 978-4-04-064260-4 | — |
| 33 | Aria the Scarlet Ammo XXXIII Corolla Return Soldier; Hidan no Aria XXXIII (緋弾のアリアXXXIII 花冠の帰還兵) | June 25, 2020; 978-4-04-064731-9 | — |
| 34 | Aria the Scarlet Ammo XXXIV Flotilla Leader of the Early Sky; Hidan no Aria XXXIV (緋弾のアリアXXXIV 早天の嚮導艦) | December 25, 2020; 978-4-04-680074-9 | — |
| 35 | Aria the Scarlet Ammo XXXV Invasion Bride; Hidan no Aria XXXV (緋弾のアリアXXXV 侵掠の花嫁) | June 25, 2021; 978-4-04-680514-0 | — |
| 36 | Aria the Scarlet Ammo XXXVI Go to Kiratsuki; Hidan no Aria XXXVI (緋弾のアリアXXXVI 綺羅月に翔べ) | December 24, 2021; 978-4-04-680999-5 | — |
| 37 | Aria the Scarlet Ammo XXXVII Third Man; Hidan no Aria XXXVII (緋弾のアリアXXXVII 第三の男) | June 24, 2022; 978-4-04-681479-1 | — |
| 38 | Aria the Scarlet Ammo XXXVIII Never Forget Love; Hidan no Aria XXXVIII (緋弾のアリアXXXVIII 愛を忘れはしない) | December 23, 2022; 978-4-04-682032-7 | — |
| 39 | Aria the Scarlet Ammo XXXIX Shinobi Priestess; Hidan no Aria XXXIX (緋弾のアリアXXXIX 荒脛巾の巫女) | June 23, 2023; 978-4-04-682565-0 | — |
| 40 | Aria the Scarlet Ammo XL Tail Woman; Hidan no Aria XL (緋弾のアリアXL 尻尾の女) | December 25, 2023; 978-4-04-682981-8 | — |
| 41 | Aria the Scarlet Ammo XLI: Dragon King of Original Sin; Hidan no Aria XLI (緋弾のアリアXLI 原罪の龍王) | June 25, 2024; 978-4-04-683701-1 | — |
| 42 | Aria the Scarlet Ammo XLII: Zero's Return; Hidan no Aria XLII (緋弾のアリアXLII ゼロの帰隊) | December 25, 2024; 978-4-04-684342-5 | — |
| 43 | Aria the Scarlet Ammo XLIII: Return in Rome; Hidan no Aria (緋弾のアリアXLIII ローマで返して) | June 25, 2025; 978-4-04-684884-0 | — |
| 44 | Aria the Scarlet Ammo XLIV: Twelve-Pointed Star in Love; Hidan no Aria (緋弾のアリアXLIV 恋する十二芒星) | December 25, 2025; 978-4-04-685501-5 | — |
| 45 | Aria the Scarlet Ammo XLV: The Crystal Tower; Hidan no Aria (緋弾のアリアXLV 玻璃の階塔) | June 25, 2026; 978-4-04-660212-1 | — |
| 46 | Aria the Scarlet Ammo XLVI: Butterfly of the Silver Spear; Hidan no Aria (緋弾のアリアXLVI 銀槍の胡蝶) | December 25, 2026; 978-4-04-660867-3 | — |

=== Manga ===
A manga adaptation, illustrated by Yoshino Koyoka, began serialization in the November 2009 issue of Media Factory's Monthly Comic Alive sold on September 26, 2009. The first tankōbon volume was published on April 23, 2010; 26 volumes have been released as of February 2025. The first three manga volumes were published in English digitally by Digital Manga in 2014. A spin-off manga titled Aria the Scarlet Ammo AA (緋弾のアリアAA, Hidan no Aria AA) by Shogako Tachibana was serialized in Square Enix's Young Gangan magazine between November 5, 2010, and May 18, 2018. It was compiled into fourteen tankōbon volumes, released between March 23, 2011, and August 23, 2018.

| No. | Title | Original release date | English release date |
|---|---|---|---|
| 1 | Aria the Scarlet Ammo 1 (緋弾のアリア 1) | April 23, 2010; 978-4-8401-3316-6 | April 11, 2014; 978-1-6131-3643-0 |
| 2 | Aria the Scarlet Ammo 2 (緋弾のアリア 2) | August 23, 2010; 978-4-8401-3362-3 | May 21, 2014; 978-1-6131-3686-7 |
| 3 | Aria the Scarlet Ammo 3 (緋弾のアリア 3) | March 23, 2011; 978-4-8401-3770-6 | May 29, 2014; 978-1-6131-3687-4 |
| 4 | Aria the Scarlet Ammo 4 (緋弾のアリア 4) | July 23, 2011; 978-4-8401-4014-0 | — |
| 5 | Aria the Scarlet Ammo 5 (緋弾のアリア 5) | December 22, 2011; 978-4-8401-4080-5 | — |
| 6 | Aria the Scarlet Ammo 6 (緋弾のアリア 6) | May 23, 2012; 978-4-8401-4468-1 | — |
| 7 | Aria the Scarlet Ammo 7 (緋弾のアリア 7) | December 22, 2012; 978-4-8401-4765-1 | — |
| 8 | Aria the Scarlet Ammo 8 (緋弾のアリア 8) | August 23, 2013; 978-4-8401-5304-1 | — |
| 9 | Aria the Scarlet Ammo 9 (緋弾のアリア 9) | December 21, 2013; 978-4-04-066145-2 | — |
| 10 | Aria the Scarlet Ammo 10 (緋弾のアリア 10) | August 23, 2014; 978-4-04-066828-4 | — |
| 11 | Aria the Scarlet Ammo 11 (緋弾のアリア 11) | December 22, 2014; 978-4-04-067219-9 | — |
| 12 | Aria the Scarlet Ammo 12 (緋弾のアリア 12) | August 22, 2015; 978-4-04-067574-9 | — |
| 13 | Aria the Scarlet Ammo 13 (緋弾のアリア 13) | January 23, 2016; 978-4-04-067856-6 | — |
| 14 | Aria the Scarlet Ammo 14 (緋弾のアリア 14) | September 23, 2016; 978-4-04-068547-2 | — |
| 15 | Aria the Scarlet Ammo 15 (緋弾のアリア 15) | March 23, 2017; 978-4-04-069123-7 | — |
| 16 | Aria the Scarlet Ammo 16 (緋弾のアリア 16) | September 23, 2017; 978-4-04-069368-2 | — |
| 17 | Aria the Scarlet Ammo 17 Shiden Witch I (緋弾のアリア 17 紫電の魔女 I) | May 23, 2018; 978-4-04-069832-8 | — |
| 18 | Aria the Scarlet Ammo 18 Shiden Witch II (緋弾のアリア 18 紫電の魔女 II) | August 23, 2018; 978-4-04-065147-7 | — |
| 19 | Aria the Scarlet Ammo 19 Shiden Witch III (緋弾のアリア 19 紫電の魔女 III) | February 23, 2019; 978-4-04-065558-1 | — |
| 20 | Aria the Scarlet Ammo 20 Shiden Witch IV (緋弾のアリア 20 紫電の魔女 IV) | August 23, 2019; 978-4-04-065869-8 | — |
| 21 | Aria the Scarlet Ammo 21 G's Blood I (緋弾のアリア 21 Gの血族 I) | February 21, 2020; 978-4-04-064378-6 | — |
| 22 | Aria the Scarlet Ammo 22 G's Blood II (緋弾のアリア 22 Gの血族 II) | August 20, 2020; 978-4-04-064842-2 | — |
| 23 | Aria the Scarlet Ammo 23 G's Blood III (緋弾のアリア 23 Gの血族 III) | February 22, 2021; 978-4-04-680148-7 | — |
| 24 | Aria the Scarlet Ammo 24 G's Blood IV (緋弾のアリア 24 Gの血族 IV) | July 21, 2021; 978-4-04-680543-0 | — |
| 25 | Aria the Scarlet Ammo 25 G Blood Family V (緋弾のアリア 25 Gの血族 V) | February 22, 2022; 978-4-04-681130-1 | — |
| 26 | Aria the Scarlet Ammo 25 G Blood Family VI (緋弾のアリア 26 Gの血族 VI) | February 21, 2025; 978-4-04-684090-5 | — |

=== Anime ===
A 12-episode anime television series adaptation, directed by Takashi Watanabe and produced by J.C.Staff, aired in Japan between April 15 and July 1, 2011. The opening theme is "Scarlet Ballet" by May'n and the ending theme is "Camellia no Hitomi" (カメリアの瞳, Kameria no Hitomi) by Aiko Nakano. An original video animation episode was released on December 21, 2011. The anime is licensed in North America by Funimation, in Australia by Madman Entertainment, and in the United Kingdom by Manga Entertainment. The anime made its North American television debut on the Funimation Channel on November 27, 2012.

An anime adaptation of Aria the Scarlet Ammo AA, a spin-off manga series written by Shogako Tachibana and produced by Doga Kobo aired in Japan between October 6 and December 22, 2015. The opening theme is "Bull's Eye" by Nano while the ending theme is "Pulse" (パルス, Parusu) by Ayane Sakura and Rie Kugimiya. The series is also licensed in North America by Funimation, who simulcasted the series as it aired.

A new short anime commemorating the anime's 15th anniversary was announced on April 15, 2026. Titled Aria the Scarlet Ammo Corto (緋弾のアリア コルト, Hidan no Aria Corto), it will produced by Bellnox Films and directed by Yoshifumi Sasahara, with Kenji Saitō and Chūgaku Akamatsu handling series composition. The series is set to begin streaming in April 2027.

== Reception ==
The Aria the Scarlet Ammo light novels have sold over 5 million copies as of April 2014. By December 2020, it had sold over 9 million copies.
