= List of Fate/Grand Order characters =

This is a list of characters from Fate/Grand Order, a Japanese online free-to-play role-playing video game based on the Fate/stay night visual novel game and franchise by Type-Moon. Along with its original characters, the list includes various characters from other works of Type-Moon.

== Concept and design ==
The characters of Fate/Grand Order, known as "Servants", are primarily based on reinterpretations of historical, literary, and mythological figures adapted into anime-inspired fantasy characters with superhuman combat abilities. They have been described as "the main appeal of the game".

Fate/Grand Order uses historical figures and events as a major component of its appeal, adapting well-known individuals such as Joan of Arc, King Arthur, Gilgamesh, Oda Nobunaga and Nero into fictionalized anime-style characters. For that purpose, various historical visual references are commonly incorporated into character designs, including clothing, accessories, and poses modeled after archival photographs and historical imagery. The use of historical figures has also been interpreted as a commercial strategy, with scholars arguing that recognizable and emotionally resonant historical personalities increased the appeal of collectible characters within the game's monetization system.

The franchise's use of symbolic costume and weapon design often mixes historical motifs with exaggerated fantasy and science-fiction elements. According to design-oriented analyses of the series, Fate/Grand Order character creation typically begins with recognizable historical references before adding visual and narrative modifications intended to make the characters more distinctive and commercially appealing. The franchise frequently adapts historical figures through established anime archetypes, relying on Japanese stereotypes for foreigner, and using the motifs of animal-human hybrids (Kemonomimi), and gender-flipping. The latter in particular is very common and has affected numerous characters, such as Attila, King Arthur (Artoria), Francis Drake, Jack the Ripper, Miyamoto Musashi, Mordred and Nero. Characters with added characteristics include, for example, Atalante, whose animal ears, tails, and similar characteristic also make her a hybrid of Greek and Japanese mythology (influenced by the kitsune – fox-spirit – and yōkai – demon – traditions).

The characters of Fate/Grand Order combine figures originating in earlier Fate works with original characters created specifically for the game. Many Fate/Grand Order characters are based on historical figures who had already been repeatedly adapted in Japanese popular culture through novels, television dramas, manga, anime, and video games. Fate/Grand Order character designs balance recognizable historical traits with fantasy and anime-inspired redesigns intended to make the characters visually distinctive while preserving their historical associations.

== Analysis ==
=== Cultural impact ===
Researchers have noted that emotional attachment to specific Servants developed by fans plays an important role in fan engagement, encouraging the creation of fan art, derivative works, cosplay, and online discussion communities. The characters of Fate/Grand Order have been a major focus of the franchise's fandom culture, generating fan art, cosplay, memes, and character popularity discussions. Academic analysis of the fandom identified extensive discourse centered on specific Servants, emotional attachment to characters, and "waifu" culture. Players frequently discussed favorite Servants, character designs, and alternate versions of characters, while also forming online communities centered around shared appreciation of particular characters. Academic analysis also identified recurring meme-related references connected to characters such as Astolfo and Ibaraki Dōji. Researchers have further argued that fandom discussion surrounding the characters expanded beyond gameplay-related topics toward broader engagement with character personalities, mythology, relationships, and fan-created reinterpretations.

Tomotani and Salvador argued that the popularity of the franchise can influence online representations of historical and mythological figures, as some Fate/Grand Order characters have become more culturally visible online (for example, in Google Images search) than the historical, literary, or mythological figures on which they are based, a phenomenon they termed the "Astolfo Effect" (named after a fictional French character, one of Charlemagne's paladins, who appears in the Fate franchise, Astolfo). The study identified characters including other similarly affected characters, such as Bradamante, Diarmuid Ua Duibhne, Dioscuri, Ereshkigal, Fergus mac Róich, Li Shuwen, Mandricardo, Mori Nagayoshi, Nero, Nitocris, Okada Izō, Osakabehime, Scáthach, Tamamo-no-Mae, and Yan Qing as examples whose Fate incarnations frequently dominated internet image search results. This finding was also tied to gender, with characters the game portrays as non-binary being particularly suspectable to that phenomenon (ex. Astolfo, Caenis, Chevalier d'Eon, Enkidu, Kiichi Hōgen, Qin Shi Huang and Taira no Kagekiyo).

Some scholars have argued that the inclusion of Servants based on real-world lore in the game means that the franchise is an introductory point through which audiences encounter historical and legendary figures that might otherwise be unfamiliar to them (particularly lesser known figures such as Semiramis, Darius III, or Hasan-i Sabbah), and that may encourage players to learn more about the historical, literary, and mythological figures that inspired them. However, Fate characters are not intended as faithful historical recreations, and their historical authenticity is often superficial and limited to easily recognizable elements, prioritizing visual appeal for audience engagement.

=== Popular culture adaptations of history ===
Researchers noted that while many Fate/Grand Order characters retain recognizable historical references, their designs and personalities are frequently modified through fantasy reinterpretation, use of anachronisms and anime-inspired stylization, with the aim of challenging accepted understandings of historical figures and historical memory. Linda Hutcheon adaptation theory has been used to analyze how the game reinterprets historical figures reshaped to fit Japanese popular culture and anime aesthetics. The franchise's reinterpretations provide alternative perspectives on well-known historical and mythological figures by presenting them through a non-Western (Japanese) cultural framework, encouraging audiences to reconsider conventional depictions and assumptions. For example, the character of Russian princess Anastasia Romanova received white hair associated with stereotypical depictions of Russian characters in Japanese media. Fate/Grand Order often amplifies selected historical personality traits into dramatic character archetypes emphasizing loyalty, tragedy, discipline, or madness, for example in the franchise's reinterpretation of Hijikata Toshizo. Similarly, Fate's Alexander the Great (Iskandar) is deliberately transformed into a recognizable anime "foreigner" archetype through characteristics like the oversized muscular build, red hair and beard, loud, and highly boisterous and outgoing personality, while retaining historical associations with conquest and cultural encounter.

The franchise frequently portrays historical memory as contested and incomplete, allowing characters to challenge widely accepted narratives about their own lives and legacies, and update historical and legendary figures for contemporary audiences while retaining recognizable links to their traditional portrayals. In this context, some scholars have interpreted the franchise's gender-swapped portrayals of historical figures as a means of questioning traditional assumptions about heroism, authority, and the construction of historical narratives rather than simple fan service. David John Boyd notes that "By reimagining the Great Men of history as many different versions of the anime girl", Fate rewrites history from the feminist perspective. Some character portrayals, such as a story about Alexander the Great reading books about himself and rejecting their accuracy, have been interpreted as commentary on historiography, highlighting the distance between historical figures and the narratives later constructed about them. Lisa Myers notes that "the Fate universe allows a number of figures, such as Mordred, Merlin, and Nero, to explain themselves and to counter common narratives about them".

Such changes to Fate/Grand Order historical and legendary cast has been cited as an example of contemporary Japanese popular culture's transformation of historical and mythological figures into stylized fictional personas incorporating anime aesthetics and fantasy elements. Academic commentary has noted the franchise's use of anime archetypes, alternate incarnations, and gender-flipped reinterpretations of historical and legendary figures, and the diverse roster incorporating figures from numerous cultural traditions, mythologies, and historical periods has been discussed as a major factor contributing to the franchise's broad and international appeal. For example, the franchise growing popularity in Western markets has been attributed in part to its large roster of ancient Mediterranean heroes and heroines, such as Alexander the Great, Atalante, and Nero. That particular group, originating form Greek and Roman mythologies, numbering (as of 2026) dozens of characters. To make the characters more appealing to Japanese readers, many Western characters are shown to have a fascination with Japanese culture and attempt to participate in customs of everyday Japanese life.

Academic commentary has situated the franchise's characters within Japan's media-mix model, in which popular characters are circulated across games, anime, manga, merchandise, and other forms of media.

== Chaldea Security Organization / Novum Chaldea ==
Ritsuka Fujimaru (藤丸立香, Fujimaru Ritsuka)
Voiced by: Nobunaga Shimazaki (Male), Akira Sekine (Female), Tomoko Kaneda (Learn with Manga! variant) (Japanese); Griffin Burns (Male), Lizzie Freeman (Female) (English)
Ritsuka Fujimaru is the main protagonist of the game. He/she is one of the 48 "Master candidates" who will partake in a mission of going back in time in order to correct the distortions of the past to prevent the extinction of humanity. Unlike other candidates, they have no relation to the Mages' Association and were a normal person who got accepted into Chaldea due to a recruitment flyer at a station. Though they are one of the 10 public applicants for the role, they were the one who survived the Spiritron simulation battle and sleep walked to the main hall where Mash and Fou found them. As they got used to the place, they learned about their role in the organization. They also escaped the sabotage that injured the remaining 47 candidates by chance, leaving them as the last Master to take the role. Being the one last Master, they gained the privilege of summoning and commanding multiple Servants but is sometimes very clueless about history, something the organization has to teach them about. They are also very nice to their Servants, especially to Mash. After the events of the Solomon singularity, they are bestowed the rank of Cause by the Mages' Association. By the events of Cosmos in the Lostbelt, they are one of the few surviving members of the Chaldea Security Organization after an attack by the Foreign God. After resolving all the Lostbelts and the Ordeal Calls, Ritsuka and Mash finally defeated the true mastermind of the Revision Incident: Maris CHALDEAS with the help from all the spirits from the Lostbelts. Following the collapse of Lostbelt 0, Ritsuka and Mash are sent back to Pan-Human History with no recollection of their adventures as members of Chaldea, although they would later get pulled back to Chaldea with their memories and progress by the P.P.P phenomenon.
Ritsuka's name and gender depends on the player's preference, which can be either male or female. Official materials usually use his male version. Gadget Tsūshin listed a fan nickname for Ritsuka, "Ikiri Sabatarō", in their 2019 anime buzzwords list.
Shielder (シールダー, Shīrudā) / Shielder Paladin (シールダー・パラディーン, Shīrudā Paradīn) – Mash Kyrielight (マシュ・キリエライト, Mashu Kirieraito)
Voiced by: Risa Taneda (Until September 2016), Rie Takahashi (Since October 2016) (Japanese); Erica Mendez (English)
A girl about Ritsuka's age who works at the Chaldea Security Organization, after the events of a major incident within the organization she forges a bond with a Heroic Spirit and awakens as a Demi-Servant. She is very knowledgeable and is supportive to Ritsuka on their mission to correct history, but can get saddened at times. Later in the game, it is revealed that she is an artificial human, created for Chaldea's Demi-Servant project under Marisbury Animusphere's orders. With the project to create an artificial human to be fused with a summoned Heroic Spirit, the project was against human laws and was abandoned. Her being the only result of the project, her body was fused with the Heroic Spirit Galahad, the second Servant summoned by Chaldea. Later in games, she used her Noble Phantasm to protect Ritsuka from Goetia's attack, at the cost of her own life. But is later revived by Primate Murder by using all of its powers to save her, but in turn, no longer being a Demi-Servant. At the events of Cosmos in the Lostbelt, she uses the Ortenaus Equipment to replicate Gallahad's abilities. Later on in Olympus, she then had the ability to use a replica of the original Black Barrel in order to take down the Olympian Gods in the Lostbelt. Due to her bond to Gallahad's Saint Graph and her slow transformation into a Heroic Servant, she cannot live beyond 2016, as her existence and memories cannot move beyond it and will be stuck to the time after resolving the Incineration of the Human Order. By the end of the fourth ordeal call, she fully broke away from her Demi-servant status, becoming her own new class: Shielder Paladin while severing her bond with Gallahad's Saint Graph and forging her own path and resolve. After resolving all the Lostbelts and the Ordeal Calls, Ritsuka and her finally defeated Maris CHALDEAS with the help from all the spirits from the Lostbelts. Following the collapse of Lostbelt 0, she and Ritsuka are sent back to Pan-Human History with no recollection of their adventures as members of Chaldea, although they would later get pulled back to Chaldea with their memories and progress by the P.P.P phenomenon.
Her appearance and concept is based on an unused concept character for Fate/stay night, known as Stray Servant.
Fou (フォウ, Fō) / Cath Palug (キャスパリーグ, Kyasu Parīgu) / Beast IV (ビーストIV, Bīsuto IV) – Primate Murder (プライミッツ・マーダー, Puraimittsu Mādā)
Voiced by: Ayako Kawasumi (Drama CD and Anime) (Japanese); Abby Trott (English)
A strange, small creature that is often cuddling with Mash, but also does it to Ritsuka as well. Its true identity is Cath Palug, Merlin's familiar and a "Breed of Calamity", a creature that represents Comparison. It first met Merlin at the Isle of Avalon and lived with him despite both arguing with each other until he decided to let him to explore the world of its wonders. He is then found by the Chaldea Security Organization, developing a fondness to Mash and Ritsuka. After the last chapter of the game, Fou revealed its true identity as one of the 7 Beasts and used its powers to revive Mash by transplanting its Force of Providence into Mash's soul. Fou was stripped of its knowledge and became more of a common animal. Afterwards, Fou stays with Mash and Ritsuka. Following the termination of Lostbelt Zero, its whereabouts are unknown.
Olga Marie Animusphere (オルガマリー・アースミレイト・アニムスフィア, Orugamarī Āsumireito Animusufia) / Unbeast (アンビースト, Anbīsuto) – U-Olga Marie (U-オルガマリー, U-Oruga Marī)
Voiced by: Megumi Toyoguchi (Drama CD), Madoka Yonezawa (Anime) (Japanese); Kira Buckland (English)
The initial leader of the Chaldea Security Organization and Marisbury Animusphere's daughter. A very high ranking mage, she is monitoring the future and trying to prevent the extinction of humanity in 2016. Though very experienced, she is very straightforward and strict, especially to Ritsuka and Romani. During the sabotage accident, she was killed in the explosion, with her spirit surviving during the Rayshift. But when she learned that Lev is the one behind the sabotage in Chaldea, she is later killed again by throwing her via flotation on Chaldeas. It is later revealed that she is meant to be thrown inside to become part of the system. But later her own body was reconstructed by Chaldeas and fell into the planet in the future timeline when she was found by researchers at Area 51, on which they conducted horrible experiments over her, dubbing her as Specimen: E.
Due to the abuse the humans on that timeline did to her, her psyche broke due to the trauma and came to believe that she truly was an alien. This makes her fuse with Chaldeas and became part of the environment, which in turn destroyed humanity in that time. She then gained a new body in the form of U-Olga Marie, known as the "Beast that Announces the End" (終わりを告げる獣, Owari o Tsugeru Kemonoi) and known under the moniker of "Foreign God" (異星の神, Isei no Kami), with her class designated as an Unbeast. During the 5th chapter, it finally descended to one of the Lostbelts: Olympus, but was critically injured by Kirschtaria Wodime using his Sirius Light, resulting for her to flee for now. In the events of the seventh chapter, she engaged the members of Novum Chaldea within the Storm Border. The fight was subtly interrupted when a third party, causing her to lose her memories after crashing into the ground. She teams up with Ritsuka, who has been separated from the rest of Chaldea. Because she & Chaldea are enemies, U-Olga Marie didn't have the opportunity to interact or understand Chaldea and their staff. However, she was clearly shaken when Nemo Marine 4, the marine accompanying her was shot dead by Izcalli and his group of Ocelomeh, showing that she has developed some sort of bond while traveling with Fujimaru's group. The partial restoration of her memories alongside the original Olga Marie's memories horrifies her with the knowledge that she was supposedly responsible for the crisis that Ritsuka and their allies are facing, and leaves the group out of unwillingness to fight her newfound friends. At the final battle against ORT, she sacrificed herself using the powers of the Storm Border's Hume-Barrel Rayproof to destroy ORT. It is later revealed by the Chaldean afterwards that she is actually a Disciple of the Foreign World and the real perpetrator of all the events thus far, is making its next move.
After the events of Ordeal Call, Novum Chaldea learned when diving deep into Antarctica and into Chaldeas that her body is still trapped inside Chaldeas, now for them to find a way to get her out of it. After a desperate battle against Maris CHALDEAS, Ritsuka tried in his last-ditch effort to save her during Lostbelt 0's collapse, but she instead threw herself into the void so that Beast VII would not rise up again and end the Animusphere Family's twisted legacy. However, she suddenly finds herself in Chaldea after its reformation by the P.P.P phenomenon with no recollection of her survival in the void (and her Unbeast saint graph still intact), and with Goredolf's absence, she resumes her role as director to take Chaldea on facing the new Beasts threats.
In The Case Files of Lord El-Melloi II, she serves as one of the main characters during the Rail Zeppelin and Grand Resolution arcs.
Romani "Roman" Archaman (ロマニ・アーキマン, Romani Ākiman) / Grand Caster (グランドキャスター, Gurando Kyasutā) – Solomon (ソロモン, Soromon)
Voiced by: Kenichi Suzumura (Japanese); Xander Mobus (English)
Romani is a researcher and doctor in Chaldea Security Organization. He is a realist and a pessimist. Despite uttering wishful thinking as a mood-maker, he seems somewhat shameless due to inwardly thinking of them as pipe dreams. He serves as a temporary leader in Chaldea during the events of the game after Olga Marie's presumed death from the First Order Incident. It is later revealed in the final chapter of the game that he is once a Servant: The Grand Caster Solomon. On his past life before becoming human, he and Marisbury Animusphere participated at the Fuyuki Holy Grail war and won. He became a human being after his own wish in the Holy Grail, which recognized him as "not incarnated as a Heroic Spirit" and that he is reborn as a human that has no relation to Solomon. He became a member of the Chaldea Security Organization as part of the medical staff.
Due to his wish, his former body became a vessel for the 72 Demons of the Ars Goeta, exacting their revenge against humanity. At the final chapter of the game, during the battle between Ritsuka and Goeta, Romani appears and reveals the truth to Ritsuka as he becomes Solomon again. He decides to erase himself from history using his Noble Phantasm, though weakening Goeta in the process for Ritsuka to defeat him. Though he died, he had lived a very good life as a human and his sacrifice ensured Chaldea's victory and the completion of the Grand Order.
Caster (キャスター, Kyasutā) / Rider (ライダー, Raidā) / Ruler (ルーラー, Rūrā) – Leonardo da Vinci (レオナルド・ダ・ヴィンチ, Reonarudo da Vinchi)
Voiced by: Maaya Sakamoto (Japanese); Erika Harlacher (English)
Leonardo is a Caster servant and the third Heroic Spirit successfully summoned by Chaldea. The spirit of Da Vinci took form with his "ideal" woman Mona Lisa as his body. She is the in-game shopkeeper and usually stays at Chaldea supporting Fujimaru's party, as she is both smart and resourceful. She is also had a good friendly relationship with Romani at times. She accompanies the group during Camelot, where she attempts to sacrifice herself against Lancelot's troops but is saved by Lancelot himself. By the end of the first chapter after Romani's sacrifice, she becomes the temporary leader of the Chaldea Security Organization before a new person can take over the role. But in the events of Cosmos of the Lostbelt, she was killed at the hands of Rasputin.
In spite of the former's death, Leonardo created a clone of her original self in case of her death, with her memories being backed up onto it. This younger Leonardo, which appears in the second chapter of the game and first became playable in Fate/Grand Order Arcade, as a Rider-class Servant meant to control the Autonomous Vessel Shadow Border. The young appearance is actually inspired on how Da Vinci says that "the Mona Lisa represented the ideal beauty she pursued during her life, so she feels nothing wrong in having become that beauty itself". Like her older self, she is the in-game shopkeeper inside the Shadow Border.
Marisbury Animusphere (マリスビリー・アニムスフィア, Marisubirī Animusufia)
Voiced by: Kenji Nojima (Japanese); Chris Hackney (English)
The former leader of the Chaldea Security Organization and the father of Olga Marie, Marisbury was a former Master Candidate during the 5th Holy Grail War. Also the Head of the Clock Tower's Celestial Body Department, who has high regards to Kirschtaria Wodime as his top student and successor than his daughter. He is also responsible for the founding of the organization, commanding the Grand Caster Servant Solomon and granting him his wish to fund for the money needed for the organization and allowing Solomon to become human in the guise of Romani. However, he was killed by an unknown assailant, who demanded him to shut down CHALDEAS and his death was made to look like he committed suicide. At the end of the seventh lostbelt, Daybit revealed that Marisbury is the true mastermind behind the events that occurred throughout the game: the attack on Chaldea, the bleaching of the Earth and the Foreign World's involvement in the Reconstruction of Humanity, including the construction of Chaldeas and the creation of Maris CHALDEAS. His actions alone made him an ally of humanity and an enemy of the universe.
He plays a minor role in The Case Files of Lord El-Melloi II, in which revealed to have hired Doctor Heartless to investigate the Holy Grail War.
Leff Lainur Flauros (レフ・ライノール・フラウロス, Refu Rainōru Furaurosu) / The Chaldean (カルデアの者, Karudea no Mono) / Pretender (プリテンダー, Puritendā) – Leff Goetia (レフ・ゲーティア, Refu Gētia)
Voiced by: Tomokazu Sugita (Japanese); Jalen K. Cassell (English)
A professor who works at Chaldea who invented "SHEBA", the 'Near-Future Observing Lens' with the help from Olga Marie. At the end of the Fuyuki chapter, he appeared and revealed himself as the mastermind of explosion in Chaldea. He also revealed that he is one of the 72 Demon Pillars of Ars Goetia Flauros. He appeared again in Septem and summoned Servants to destroy the Roman Empire early during Nero's reign. He is later killed by Altera shortly after summoning the Saber class Servant. He returned in Solomon chapter as the Demon Pillar Flauros who guards the Second Seat of Solomon and has believed to have perished after the defeat of Goetia.
However he has shown to have survived after the event, becoming a mysterious individual who bears a similar appearance to Romani's after his death at the hands of Goetia, claiming to be affiliated with Chaldea. He first had several mentions in earlier Lostbelt chapters as a mysterious individual spreading Chaldea's existence as hope, until his full first appearance in the Atlantis Lostbelt where he saves Ritsuka and company from their first encounter with Kirschtaria, who seemed to fear him as well. Though Ritsuka and Mash are delightful to see him again, he claims not to be the Romani they know, though at the same time later he adopts his name. He traveled through the Lostbelts ahead of the Shadow Border, helping the inhabitants and spreading the name of Chaldea for an unknown agenda. He fully revealed his true identity and challenges Ritsuka and Mash for one final Grand Duel, using the image of Solomon. He however lost and soon re-joins Novum Chaldea on their final battle on Antarctica. After the group exposes the Foreign Priestess as the true Beast VII and plans to destroy Novum Chaldea, he soon used his Noble Phantasm Ars Nova to nullify her authority on Nega-Summon, while he dies in the process.
Ruler (ルーラー, Rūrā) – Sherlock Holmes (シャーロック・ホームズ, Shārokku Hōmuzu)
Voiced by: Takahiro Mizushima (Japanese); Sean Chiplock (English)
First Introduced in the Epic of Remnant Chapter, Sherlock Holmes is a Ruler-Class servant that serves as administrative advisor in the Chaldea Security Organization. Originally a Caster, his class was the result of him changing his Saint Graph to become a different class. Like his original counterpart, he is very calm, knowledgeable and cunning. Also, he is very contemplative, but at the same time, active, Bold, but at the same time, precise to his deductions. He often butted heads with James Moriarty in some scenarios, especially events. During the attack on Chaldea in Cosmos in the Lostbelt, he is one of the few surviving members of the organization. It was until in Traum that he's revealed to be a double agent, as he is the first apostle of the Foreign God. His own memories was sealed away on purpose and was sent to Earth to monitor Chaldea during the crisis against Goetia. Holmes realizes that he had been ignoring the questions about his summoning and who his Master truly was, averting his eyes so that he could continue to be with his friends at Chaldea. Learning the truth, he dies in a duel with Moriarty at Reichenbach Falls, allowing Moriarty to kill him so that he will not become Chaldea's enemy. As he falls off the cliff with a smile he bears his friends at Chaldea farewell, knowing that they will be the ones to win in the end. In the final chapter, he returned after Ritsuka cheated the summoning system inside Chaldeas, summoning him using his Command Spell in front of Maris Chaldeas and exposing her flaws in her system and objectives.
Shielder (シールダー, Shīrudā) – Galahad (ギャラハッド, Gyarahaddo)
Voiced by: Shun Horie
First appearing in First Order and later in Moonlight/Lostroom, Galahad is a Shielder-Class servant and the second Heroic Spirit successfully summoned by Chaldea. He was summoned during Chaldea's Demi-Servant Project in which he is fused with the designer child Mash Kyrielight. However this move alone caused him anger towards the group as he tries to murder the researchers in Chaldea, only for Mash to stop his rage. Due to Mash's short lifespan, he can keep her alive inside her and lending her his powers. When the Grand Order began in A.D 2016, Ritsuka and Mash used his powers to complete the order and save humanity. But when the Foreign God decided to destroy humanity and revert the world the Age of the Gods, he decided to refuse assisting Ritsuka and stripped Mash of authority to use his powers, telling him to stop his efforts to save humanity as it was futile. He is shown to think highly of himself despite saving people. By the fourth Ordeal Call, it is revealed he is summoned by Chaldeas itself to start the Human Order Revision Incident by summoning the Foreign God Disciples. He is defeated by both Ritsuka and Mash, with him now recognizing Mash's newfound strength.
Jingle Abel Meuniere (ジングル・アベル・ムニエル, Jinguru Aberu Munieru)
Voiced by: Jizoudou Takehiro
Jingle is one of Chaldea's staff member, who is assigned as Coffin Staff officer during the first chapter of the game. Usually in charge on assisting Ritsuka and some servants during Rayshifting, he can be very worrying on the situations that the group is facing at times. During the events of the second chapter, he is one of the original surviving staff members of Chaldea after the takeover. He shows a bit of distrust over Goredolf however. After Chaldea gets reformed by the P.P.P phenomenon, he gets promoted to Control Room section leader alongside Elron by a newly revived Olga Marie.
Goredolf Musik (ゴルドルフ・ムジーク, Gorudorufu Mujīku)
Voiced by: Atsushi Imaruoka
An alchemist sent by the Mage's Association to be the new director of the Chaldea Security Organization, a year after the final battle against Goetia. However, it was revealed he is just a scapegoat for the Foreign God's invasion in Chaldea which forced the surviving members to abandon the place. Though he was one of the survivors, the members of the group were once hesitant towards him before they earned his trust. After reaching the Wandering Sea, he becomes the leader of Novum Chaldea. He is the son of Gordes Musik Yggdmillennia from Fate/Apocrypha. Following the termination of Lostbelt Zero, his whereabouts are unknown.
Sion Eltnam Sokaris (シオン・エルトナム・ソカリス, Shion Erutonamu Sokarisu)
Voiced by: Shiki Aoki
A Magus who hailed from the remote base in the Wandering Sea, Sion is a member of the Atlas Institute. She is shown to be very talented and devoted to her research with a positive thinking which let to her becoming the youngest alchemist to ever qualify as an instructor in Atlas. She is also greatly prepared, predicting the invasion of the Foreign God that would wipe out humanity in 3 months. After assisting the surviving members of the Chaldea Security Organization, she and her servant Captain converted the base into a replica of the old base, and forming the group Novum Chaldea. By the end of the story during the collapse of Lostbelt 0, she stayed behind the damaged Storm Border alongside Nemo as the ship is destroyed, killing both of them in the collapse.
Rider (ライダー, Raidā) – Captain Nemo (ネモ船長, Nemo-senchō)
Voiced by: Yumiri Hanamori
Shion's Heroic Servant, classified as a Rider-Class Servant. Also known as "Captain" (キャプテン, Kyaputen), he is incompletely summoned due to the lack of a summoning system and that a Phantom is used to complete him. He is shown to be a good builder despite his child-like appearance. Its later confirmed in the fourth lostbelt about his true identity and that he is summoned with the phantom of divine spirit Triton. Because of his summoning, he also has an ability to split his saint graph to create clones of himself which works as crew members of the Nautilus dubbed the 'Nemo Series'. By the fifth lostbelt, he commands Novum Chaldea's new flagship; the Storm Border as the group's new base of operations. By the end of the story during the collapse of Lostbelt 0, he stayed behind to confort Sion as the damaged Storm Border is destroyed, killing both of them in the collapse.
In addition to his ability to create clones for the ship's crew (where they are also split in boys and girls), the Nemo series consists of:

- Nemo Bakery – The head chef of the Nautilus. Running the cafeteria (bakery), it is seen as an indispensable part of the ship.
- Nemo Professor – The onboard professor of the Nautilus and the Storm Border, who is designated for planning, analysis, and research.
- Nemo Engine – The head engineering for the Storm Border and Nautilus' maintenance.
- Nemo Nurse – The head nurse who runs the sickbay of the Nautilus to provide care to the crew. They are known to be the most mature among the Nemo Series.
- Nemo Marines – The main taskforce focused on cleaning, handling supplies, maintenance, and various other tasks. There are 24 marines in total.

Rider (ライダー, Raidā) – Habetrot (ハべトロット, Habetorotto)
Voiced by: Ayasa Itō
First appearing in Avalon Le Fae as an ally, Habetrot is a Fairy who lived in the British Lostbelt circa 2017 in the Queen Calendar. She is originally Totorot, the Knight of Beginnings and once the ally of Tonelico during the war in Lostbelt Britain 2000 years ago. At that time, she had met Mash, who got sent back in time after the incident in Norwich and helped her to make sure she will be reunited with the rest of Chaldea years later. After the war, she is one of the survivors who adapted into the rule of her former ally, now going as Morgan. Introverted and active. Despite not being prone of self-assertion, she performs what she must do/what she wants to do in a powerful manner. Her Lostbelt counterpart suffered with issues on her memory capacity due to the culture of "seeing off brides" not being developed, but the original Habetrot is very clever despite being a small fairy. She appeared in the British Lostbelt as an ally, and the one who found Mash when she was unconscious and had lost her memories. Though she didn't know she was talking to the same person she helped 2000 years ago.
She also had held and salvaged the broken parts of the Black Barrel, in which it was poisoning her due to how unique the weapon is. She finally gave the Black Barrel back to Mash as a sign of gratitude in which resulted to her existence crumbling and fading in front of her and Ritsuka. Upon completion of the British Lostbelt, she is resummoned immediately into Chaldea as the Black Barrel's guardian. Now residing within the barrel, she now accompanies Mash and Novum Chaldea for further missions and is one their technical engineers.
Kadoc Zemlupus (カドック・ゼムルプス, Kadokku Zemurupusu)
Voiced by: Kenji Akabane
First appearing as one of the members of the Crypters, who commands the Russian Lostbelt and also a member of Chaldea Security Organization's A-Team. He was recruited by the organization as one of the 48 Master Candidates, who then later became part of the A-Team. He has masochistic tendencies and also timid, but is a mythology enthusiast and an avid reader. Mash observes him to be always paying attention to his surroundings. But, he is somewhat sensitive about being pessimistic. When he joined Chaldea, Kadoc was happy because he was not chosen due to his bloodline or his magecraft but for his capability to be a Master, a strength that he was born with. After he joined the A-Team, his pride feelings of inferiority became even stronger, as all his colleagues were first-class geniuses. Even so, he chose to whole-heartedly do his best to protect the Human Order, but his inferiority complex grew even larger after everything was rendered meaningless by Lev Lainur Flauros sabotage and being brought back by the Foreign God. He also likes rock music and apparently becomes saddened when such luxuries will not exist in his Lostbelt.
He first appeared alongside the other Crypters after the Foreign God had brought the world back to the Age of the Gods and locking it out from foreign interference. He is then assigned to the Lostbelt in Russia with a Caster-Class Servant Anastasia as his Heroic Servant. After the collapse of the first lostbelt, he was taken into custody, but was recaptured by Rasputin and taken to Olympus. He came into contact with Novum Chaldea as one of Europa's collaborators, and was severely injured by Douman for getting too close to the truth of the Alien god until Rasputin saved him and brought him to the Storm Border after fulfilling Anastasia's promise. After the collapse of the Lostbelt, he is again under Novum Chaldea's custody. He then became a full-pledged member of Novum Chaldea, acting as a backup master alongside Ritsuka. However in the fourth ordeal call, he used his Sirius Light to summon Anastasia to show in Metatron Jeanne's court to finally prove Novum Chaldea's innocence while he dies in the process.
Cerejeira Elron (セレシェイラ・エルロン, Seresheira Eruron)
Voiced by: Yuna Kamakura
First appearing as the master of Lancer (Bhima) in the Paper Moon simulated System Holy Grail War only known as 'Cerejeira', she is the Prime AI representing the Keep region. She appeared as the most reluctant of all the masters in the Grail War as she harbored immense guilt until meeting Bhima and an AI counterpart of Sakura Matou, where they strengthen her resolve to let go of her burden. In the conclusion of the System Grail War, she becomes the only surviving Prime AI in the simulated world and was set up by Sion to be its Governing AI.
It is later revealed that her Alter Ego AI manifestation originated from Cerejeira Elron, who is Chaldea's record clerk and one of the surviving members, where the Paper Moon picked up her data as she was the closest individual to Chaldea's record. She felt responsible for Chaldea's original destruction when she was in charge of Chaldea's gate on the day of the Crypters' attack on Chaldea, as she and her colleagues who let them in, hence where her guilt originated for her Alter Ego personality. Following the Paper Moon incident, she meets up with Ritsuka where she makes amends for her mistakes. After Chaldea gets reformed by the P.P.P phenomenon, she gets promoted to Control Room section leader alongside Meuniere by the newly reinstated Olga Marie.
Assassin (アサシン, Asashin) – "Old Man of the Mountain" ("山の翁", Yama no Okina) – Azrael (アズライール, Azuraīru)
Voiced by: Jouji Nakata, Ryōsuke Kanemoto (Azrael) (Japanese); Crispin Freeman (English)
Appearing in Camelot as an ally, the Old Man of the Mountain is an Assassin-Class servant summoned in the grand order during A.D 1273. As the founder of the Hashashin, he once hold the title Hassan-i Sabbah. Known to be knowledgeable, calm, stern and straight-forward individual. He possesses extremely low tolerance for impoliteness, as he almost immediately annihilated the protagonist's group upon their uninvited visit to his temple. However, he is far from being heartless, simply a man with unshakable faith and strict code of conduct. He was willing to hear his visitor's plea for aid and accept it, but only on the condition that one of the Hassans be willing to die for it. He holds the title of "Grand Assassin" (グランドアサシン, Gurando Asashin), and his sword Azrael, which is his Noble Phantasm, can invoke the concept of death to its target. However, he discards his Grand title when he decided to intervene on humanity's battle against Tiamat.
A younger incarnation of the Old Man where he still bear his Grand title under the name Azrael would appear in Aftertime, where when the newly reformed P.P.P Chaldea is understaffed, the human order itself summoned him to supervise Chaldea and Olga Marie for a year due to her status as an Unbeast and would fill the role of administrative advisor left by Holmes.

== Notable allies ==
=== Observer at the Timeless Temple ===
==== Fuyuki ====
Caster (キャスター, Kyasutā) – Cú Chulainn (クー・フーリン, Kū Fūrin)
Voiced by: Nobutoshi Canna (Japanese); Tony Oliver (English)
Appearing in Fuyuki as an ally, Cú Chulainn is a Caster-Class servant summoned in the grand order during A.D 2006. Although he was summoned as Cú Chulainn, he was actually a psudo-servant of Odin, having foreseen the plans of both Goetia and the Foreign God, used Cú Chulainn as a proxy to help him save the Human Order. Cú Chulainn was initially summoned to the Fuyuki Singularity as Lancer, but Odin granted him his Authority, transforming him into Caster and giving him some of Odin's abilities. Having manifested as a Caster, he apparently has imposed upon himself the role as one who guides. Not as a true druid, but as a temporary one, as long as he continues together with his Master, he shall illuminate the path that the Master walks on. Though he is a Pseudo-Servant of Odin, Cú Chulainn is the persona in control of the body. He first appeared in the Fuyuki Singularity, coming across Ritsuka, Mash, and Olga Marie Animusphere while they're being beset by Hassan of the Cursed Arm and Musashibou Benkei. He helps them kill the two in the hopes of recruiting them as allies against Artoria Alter. After resolving the singularity and declaring the start of the Grand Order, Cú Chulainn askis Ritsuka to summon him as a Lancer next time before he disappears.
Cú later appeared in the British Lostbelt, calling himself Grímr the Wise. When Cú Chulainn returned to the Throne of Heroes after defeating Artoria Alter in the Fuyuki Singularity, Odin let him retain his memories of that summoning. He was then summoned into the English Lostbelt a year before Chaldea arrived there. Cú Chulainn spent the year waiting for Chaldea to arrive learning what he could about Odin's actions in the Lostbelt as Grímr 6,000 years ago, as he was not given that information when summoned.

==== Orleans ====
Rider (ライダー, Raidā) / Caster (キャスター, Kyasutā) – Marie Antoinette (マリー・アントワネット, Marī Antowanetto)
Voiced by: Risa Taneda
Appearing in Orleans as an ally, Marie is a Rider-Class servant summoned in the grand order during A.D 1431. Her own appearance is based that of an "Idol Queen", both very endowed and with the best body. Yet she is very nice and soothing, with her need for her love to her people. However, she is also doesn't display traits of being a queen of tragedy like her real life counterpart does.
Assassin (アサシン, Asashin) – Charles-Henri Sanson (シャルル = アンリ・サンソン, Sharuru-Anri Sanson)
Voiced by: Mamoru Miyano (Japanese); Max Mittelman (English)
Appearing in Orleans as an antagonist and later in Salem as an ally, Charles is an Assassin-Class servant summoned in the grand order during A.D 1431. He seemingly has a very neutral stance regarding Ritsuka and is considered a man who loves humans and abides to the law strictly. Despite him being the executor, he believes in god but also that "god does nothing." Therefore, he embraces the sorrowful duty of cutting down "evil" with "evil". During the Grand Order conflict, he has a friendly relationship with Marie.
Caster (キャスター, Kyasutā) – Wolfgang Amadeus Mozart (ヴォルフガング・アマデウス・モーツァルト, Worufugangu Amadeusu Mōtsaruto)
Voiced by: Tomokazu Seki (Japanese); Billy Kametz (English)
Appearing in Orleans as an ally, Mozart is a Caster-Class servant summoned in the grand order during A.D 1431. Known as one of the best musician and composers in the 18th century, he is a man of skills when it comes to his works. He shares a friendly, if not, heated rivalry with his friend Italian composer Antonio Salieri, but also has a relationship with Marie Antoinette soon before she was beheaded. As revealed, he was once to become a vessel for Amdusias, one of the 72 demons of the Ars Goeta due to his 72 Magus bloodline. But his devotion and love for music (with him selling his soul to music) saved him from that said fate.
Berserker (バーサーカー, Bāsākā) / Lancer (ランサー, Ransā) – Kiyohime (清姫, Kiyohime)
Voiced by: Risa Taneda
Appearing in Orleans as an ally, Kiyohime is a Berserker-Class servant summoned in the grand order during A.D 1431. Described to be a love-maniac, she is very clingy and affectionate towards Ritsuka as she thinks he's the reincarnation of Anchin. Due to her rather lustful personality, special care was required.

==== Septem ====
Lancer (ランサー, Ransā) – Leonidas I (レオニダス一世, Reonidasu-issei)
Voiced by: Shin-ichiro Miki (Japanese); Ray Chase (English)
Appearing in Septem as an antagonist, later an ally, Leonidas is a Lancer-Class servant summoned in the grand order during A.D 0060. Known as the "King of Sparta", Leonidas is very good on his loyalty but can be gutsy at all times. He is also very loyal to Ritsuka at times. He first appeared in the second singularity as a summoned servant, leading the soldiers of the United Empire invading the Roman Empire. He later returned in Babylonia as one of the Servants summoned by Gilgamesh to defend Uruk.
Assassin (アサシン, Asashin) – Jing Ke (荊軻, Keika)
Voiced by: Atsuko Tanaka
Appearing in Septem and S I N as an ally, Jing Ke is an Assassin-Class servant summoned in the grand order during A.D 0060. Though a well trained assassin, she is a hedonist individual, who loved reading, swordsmanship, chats with her wise friends and, more than anything, alcohol. She appears as an advisor for Nero, and she claims to serve her because "her enemies are attracting her to assassinate them". She later appears in S I N, also an ally to assist Ritsuka and his group in the Chinese Lostbelt.
Rider (ライダー, Raidā) – Boudica (ブーディカ, Būdika)
Voiced by: Chiwa Saito
Appearing in Septem as an antagonist and later an ally, Boudica is a Rider-Class servant summoned in the grand order during A.D 0060. Both cheerful and bright, she is eager to make friends with everyone except to the Romans and has also developed a big-sister relationship to Mash. Although Boudica is a warrior who draws on the flow of the Celts to do battle with pride, she is primarily a warm person. She appeared in Septem as an ally with Spartacus under Nero's rebel army to repel the United Roman Empire.

==== Okeanos ====
Archer (アーチャー, Āchā) – Orion (オリオン) / Superhuman Orion (超人オリオン, Chōjin Orion)
Voiced by: Nobutoshi Canna (Orion), Miyuki Sawashiro (Artemis) (Japanese); Tony Oliver (Orion), Erica Lindbeck (Artemis) (English)
First appeared in the Moon Goddess event and later in Okeanos, Orion is an Archer-class Servant summoned in the grand order during A.D 1573. Although the girl claims to be Orion, it is later revealed that the bear is the real Orion and the female Archer is Artemis, a Divine Spirit. They are summoned in a bizarre process where Artemis becomes clingy to Orion's spirit that when Orion is summoned, Artemis comes with him as well reducing him to a teddy bear as summoning a divine spirit is impossible. Artemis in the other hand has blank status as she is not qualified to be a Servant so she takes Orion's status instead. Artemis is a happy-go-lucky person yet she has almost no regard for human life while Orion is more of a mediator yet lazy and irresponsible but he is shrewd too, occasionally evading Artemis' accusations of having an affair splendidly. Fundamentally, Orion's role is to keep her in check, and she personally dislikes more than anything else the words called "patience" and "perseverance". They both appeared during the events of the third singularity, assisting Ritsuka and Drake on taking down both Jason and Edward.
Another version of both Orion and Artemis also appeared in the fifth lostbelt. Artemis, as it suggests, is one of the Gods serving Kirschtaria Wodime, confined into a form outside Earth as an orbital cannon. Orion was summoned separately on the lostbelt as well, and is also revealed to hold the title of "Grand Archer" (グランドアーチャー, Gurando Āchā). Despite his bulky muscular appearance, he has the same mannerisms and personality similar to his teddy bear self. He appears as part of the New Argonauts to assist Novum Chaldea in destroying the lostbelt. However, he made a great sacrifice as he gave up his grand title to take down Artemis from the sky while dying in the process.
Berserker (バーサーカー, Bāsākā) – Asterios (アステリオス, Asuteriosu) / Minotaurus (ミーノータウロス, Mīnōtaurosu)
Voiced by: Kōsuke Toriumi
Appearing in Okeanos as an ally and later in Anastasia as an Antagonist, Asterios is a Berserker-class servant summoned in the grand order during A.D 1573. Despite looking like a gigantic beast even with a mask, Asterios is a gentle and calm being, despite being a berserker and his myth surrounding him. Though he rarely unleashes his tendencies to go berserk to fight off his opponents, he is far more docile than the other Berserkers. He has problems with his speech, and sometimes plays with Euryale during their time in the singularity. He appears in the Okeanos singularity as Euryale's guardian, residing inside the Labyrinth meant to protect her from intruders. Another version of Asterios also appeared in the first lostbelt Anastasia, in which is now called Minotaurus. This version is now devoid of his old personality and is now a mindless beast serving the Lostbelt King.
Archer (アーチャー, Āchā) – David (ダビデ, Dabide)
Voiced by: Yuichi Nakamura
Appearing in Okeanos as an ally, David is an Archer-class servant summoned in the grand order during A.D 1573. Shown to be a prodigy, he is a realist and wise person. Placing his duty as an agent of God first and foremost, David possesses the strength of will to maintain an extreme calmness in the face of utter desperation, clear-mindedly evaluating his situation in a realistic manner.

==== London ====
Berserker (バーサーカー, Bāsākā) / Rider (ライダー, Raidā) – Sakata Kintoki (坂田金時, Sakata Kintoki)
Voiced by: Kōji Yusa
Appearing in London as an ally, Sakata Kintoki is a Berserker-class servant summoned in the grand order during A.D 1888. He is a large but kind man in modern clothes and wielding a golden axe and likes everything that is golden. He is one of the Servants summoned by the demonic fog in London alongside Tamamo-no-Mae, although he doesn't show any hostility towards the Chaldea group and decided to fight against Nikola Tesla. He appeared again in Solomon chapter, and changed into his Rider-Class form from the Onigashima Event and assist the London Servants to defeat the Demon Pillars.

==== E Pluribus Unum ====
Berserker (バーサーカー, Bāsākā) / Archer (アーチャー, Āchā) – Florence Nightingale (フローレンス・ナイチンゲール, Furōrensu Naichingēru)
Voiced by: Miyuki Sawashiro (Japanese); Erica Lindbeck (English)
Appearing in E Pluribus Unum as an ally, Florence Nightingale is a Berserker-class servant summoned in the grand order during A.D 1783. Nightingale is a woman of conviction: a person dedicated to take care of the sick and wounded, even on the battlefield and never bends her beliefs. A notable exception includes her encounter with Cú Chulainn Alter where she states "You are ill, I recommend suicide".
Caster (キャスター, Kyasutā) – Geronimo (ジェロニモ, Jeronimo)
Voiced by: Hisao Egawa (Japanese); Mark Allen Jr. (English)
Appearing in E Pluribus Unum as an ally, Geronimo is a Caster-class servant summoned in the grand order during A.D 1783. He is a heroic Apache warrior during and leads a faction of native American people who are in conflict with the United States when the Celtic army cause chaos in the land. He remained neutral and did not side with the Celts. He freed the protagonist and his/her party when they are captured by Edison.
Caster (キャスター, Kyasutā) – Thomas Edison (トーマス・エジソン, Tōmasu Ejison)
Voiced by: Takuma Terashima
Appearing in E Pluribus Unum as an ally, Thomas Edison is a Caster-class servant summoned in the grand order during A.D 1783. The spirit of the American inventor, who manifested as a servant with a lion's head. He has a very straightforward personality, and it is said there are not many points of caution for the Master when dealing with him as a Servant. He is also shown to have a rivalry with Nikola Tesla. He is one of the leaders of Theosophical Society, a faction that is fighting the Celtic army but also having a conflict with Geronimo's faction, along with Helena Blavatsky and Karna, but later worked together with Geronimo's faction.
Caster (キャスター, Kyasutā) – Helena Blavatsky (エレナ・ブラヴァツキー, Erena Buravatsukī)
Voiced by: Hisako Kanemoto (Japanese); Emi Lo (English)
Appearing in E Pluribus Unum as an ally, Helena Blavatsky is a Caster-class servant summoned in the grand order during A.D 1783. Though being a magus, Helena is an eternal magical girl who is kind to others and yet strict to herself. In addition, her nature is seemingly reflected as that of a "meddlesome mother/elder sister that is helpful in taking care of others." However, she still is a genius endowed with a strong self-assertion. She appeared in the 5th singularity as Edison's aide and part of the Theosophical Society fighting against the Celtic Army.
Lancer (ランサー, Ransā) / Assassin (アサシン, Asashin) – Scáthach (スカサハ, Sukasaha) / Caster (キャスター, Kyasutā) / Ruler (ルーラー, Rūrā) – Scáthach-Skaði (スカサハ = スカディ, Sukasaha-Sukadi)
Voiced by: Mamiko Noto
Appearing in E Pluribus Unum as an ally, later as the main antagonist of Götterdämmerung, Scáthach is a Lancer-class servant summoned in the grand order during A.D 1783. Due to her immortality, she herself cannot be summoned in a standard Holy Grail War as she is cursed to live for thousands of years until her death when the Dunscaith Castle is completely burned down by Solomon. She is summoned as she opposes the Celtic's advancement in America, with the help of Li Shuwen.
Another version of Scáthach also appeared in the Second Lostbelt as the level's Lostbelt King and antagonist. This version was summoned while being fused with the spirit of the divine spirit Skaði by Odin during Ragnarok. She is a "completely different person" compared to the Scáthach from the common history, recognized as the only god in the Lostbelt, whose nature is closer to being a queen. In this work, Scáthach and Skadi are not perfectly equal in existences, but they mutually influence each other and the term "mixed up" is used. As she serves the Lostbelt's Ruler, she determines the lifespan of the people living them. But she then make a truce with Chaldea in order to defeat Surtr, though she is then defeated by Ritsuka and co.
Saber (セイバー, Seibā) – Rama (ラーマ, Rāma)
Voiced by: Miyuki Sawashiro
Appearing in E Pluribus Unum as an ally, Rama is a Saber-class servant summoned in the grand order during A.D 1783. He first appeared almost killed by Cu Chulainn Alter until Nightingale saved his life. Rama holds himself to stay alive until he reunited with his wife Sita. However, due to the Curse of Separation, both of them aren't allowed to reunite with one another as Sita sacrificed her own life, taking the curse Cu Alter inflicted on him to keep the dying Rama alive. After he regained his strength, he helped the heroes to defeat the Celtic army. He then reappears during the 4th Lostbelt, where he is also an ally.
Archer (アーチャー, Āchā) – Sita (シータ, Shīta)
Voiced by: Miyuki Sawashiro
Appearing in E Pluribus Unum as an NPC, Sita is an Archer-Class servant summoned in the grand order during A.D 1783. While being summoned in the Holy Grail War in that time, both of them are forbidden to be reunited due to the Curse of Separation. Also, she is also imprisoned by the Celtic Army after she was defeated in California. When Chaldea reached where she is and saw Rama dying from the wound inflicted by Cu, she decided to take the curse upon herself. Her sacrifice saved Rama but at the cost of her own life. Though not playable in the main game, she is officially playable in Fate/Grand Order Arcade, taking Rama's place in the game's story.
Archer (アーチャー, Āchā) – Billy the Kid (ビリー・ザ・キッド, Birī za Kiddo)
Voiced by: Urara Takano
Appearing in E Pluribus Unum as an ally, Billy is an Archer-class servant summoned in the grand order during A.D 1783. He works with Robin Hood to defend American towns from Celtic forces and summoned beasts. He returns in Anastasia chapter as one of Servants summoned by the World in the Russian Lostbelt.

==== Camelot ====
Caster (キャスター, Kyasutā) / Assassin (アサシン, Asashin) – Nitocris (ニトクリス, Nitokurisu) / Avenger (アヴェンジャー, Avenjā) – Nitocris Alter (ニトクリス・オルタ, Nitokurisu Oruta)
Voiced by: Minami Tanaka (Japanese); Gina Bowes (English)
Appearing in Camelot as an ally, Nitocris is a Caster-Class servant summoned in the grand order during A.D 1273. She is a powerful Egyptian sorceress and also a pharaoh that once ruled Egypt before the time of Ozymandias. She and Ozymandias confront the party at the beginning of the Camelot chapter, but after her defeat, she joins our heroes to defeat the tyranny of the Lion King. Another form of Nitocris later appeared during the seventh lostbelt, described to be as an earthly embodiment of Anubis and a fearsome arbiter of divine punishment.
Caster (キャスター, Kyasutā) – Xuanzang Sanzang (玄奘三藏, Genjō Sanzō)
Voiced by: Mikako Komatsu (Japanese); Reba Buhr (English)
Appearing in Camelot as an ally, Sanzang is a Caster-Class servant summoned in the grand order during A.D 1273. She was first introduced in Journey to the West event, where she travels to Ganges along with other Servants. She appeared later in Camelot chapter as a wandering Servant who had been a guest of the Lion King and offered her to be one of her knights. However, due to the actions of the Lion King against the people, she refused. She meets the Chaldea group and allies, and later assists them in the assault to Camelot.
Archer (アーチャー, Āchā) – Tawara Touta (俵藤太, Tawara Tōta)
Voiced by: Kenichi Suzumura
Appearing in Camelot as an ally, Tawara is an Archer-Class servant summoned in the grand order during A.D 1273. He is a warrior during the Heian period who is known for exterminating the giant centipede on Mount Mikami and later, emerged as Fujiwara no Hidesato who defeated Taira no Masakado. He appeared in Camelot chapter as one of Ritsuka's allies against the Lion King.

==== Babylonia ====
Archer (アーチャー, Āchā) / Rider (ライダー, Raidā) – Ishtar (イシュタル, Ishutaru)
Voiced by: Kana Ueda (Japanese); Mela Lee (English)
Appearing in Babylonia as an ally, Isthar is an Archer-Class servant summoned in the grand order during B.C 2500. She is a Pseudo-Servant consisting of the Mesopotamian goddess Ishtar using the body of Rin Tohsaka as her vessel to be able to pass on as a Servant. She appeared in Babylonia chapter as one of the Three Goddesses Alliance that attacks Uruk. However, after being treated like a joke by the two other goddesses, she sided the heroes throughout the story.
Caster (キャスター, Kyasutā) – Merlin (マーリン, Mārin)
Voiced by: Takahiro Sakurai (Japanese); Robbie Daymond (English)
Appearing in Babylonia as an ally, Merlin is a Caster-Class servant summoned in the grand order during B.C 2500. Known as the "Magus of Flowers", he is the magus and prophet in Arthurian legends and also Fou's master. He first appears in the America chapter, blocking Cu Chulainn's attack on Mash and allowing Karna to use Vasavi Shakti, forcing Berserker to retreat. In Camelot, he was revealed to have awakened Bedivere and sent him to the singularity. He makes a proper appearance in Babylon, being one of the servants summoned by Gilgamesh. He kept Tiamat asleep until Fujimaru's party killing the Gorgon woke her. After Tiamat is lured into the underworld, Merlin uses the flowers produced by his Garden of Avalon to shut down the authority of her Chaos Tide, turning it into ordinary mud and giving control of the underworld back to Ereshkigal. After Solomon's sacrifice in the final singularity, he currently holds the title of "Grand Caster".
Lancer (ランサー, Ransā) – Ana (アナ)
Voiced by: Yū Asakawa (Japanese); Melissa Fahn (English)
Appearing in Babylonia as an ally, Ana is a Lancer-Class servant summoned in the grand order during B.C 2500. Shown as an assistant to Merlin and despite her young appearance, she is known to be extremely calm and silent and serves as a foil to Merlin at times. It is later revealed in the story that she is younger version of the Rider-Class servant Medusa, the youngest of the Gorgon sisters. Throughout the story, she sacrificed herself after defeating Gorgon, which triggered the awakening of Tiamat. But later on she returned in her gorgon form.
Rider (ライダー, Raidā) / Berserker (バーサーカー, Bāsākā) / Assassin (アサシン, Asashin) – Ushiwakamaru (牛若丸)
Voiced by: Saori Hayami (Japanese); Laura Stahl (English)
Appearing in Babylonia as an ally, later as an antagonist, Ushiwakamaru is a Rider-Class servant summoned in the grand order during B.C 2500. She is one of the Servants summoned by Gilgamesh to defend Uruk from the invasion of the three gods alliance and later perished during the attack against Tiamat. Now corrupted by the Chaos Tide and assuming her Berserker form, she leads the army of Lahmu on their invasion in Uruk until she fully perished at the hands of Benkei.
Lancer (ランサー, Ransā) – Musashibō Benkei (武蔵坊弁慶)
Voiced by: Tetsu Inada (Japanese); Chris Tergliafera (English)
Appearing in Babylonia as an ally, Benkei is a Lancer-Class servant summoned in the grand order during B.C 2500. Being a retainer to Ushiwakamaru, he is shown to be very loyal towards her until her demise at the hands of Tiamat. After seeing her returning as a corrupted servant, he then did his best to beat her and ultimately sacrificing himself killing her to free her soul from the influence of the Chaos Tide. His character biography reveals he is in fact another retainer of Ushiwakamaru pretending to be Benkei, Hitachibō Kaison, who unlike Benkei survived the Genpei war and went on to tell the legend of his boss.
Siduri (シドゥリ, Shiduri)
Voiced by: Yumi Uchiyama (Japanese); Lauren Landa (English)
Gilgamesh's assistant and Alewife, who she acts on Gil's behalf asking if they recovered the Tablet of Heaven. Due to the duo's kindness, she provided Mash and Ritsuka a room during their stay in Babylonia. However, during Tiamat's attack in Babylona, she was turned into a Lahmu but did not attack Ritsuka's group. She then sacrificed herself by protecting Kingu after finding out that he was betrayed by Tiamat and impaled him to obtain the Holy Grail needed for its true revival. She then appeared in Battle in New York 2019 as the event's shopkeeper. Though she appeared, she has no specific heroic class.
Lancer (ランサー, Ransā) – Ereshkigal (エレシュキガル, Ereshukigaru) / Ereshkigal Alter (エレシュキガル・オルタ, Ereshukigaru Oruta)
Voiced by: Kana Ueda (Japanese); Mela Lee (English)
Appearing in Babylonia as an antagonist and later an ally, Ereshkigal is a Lancer-Class servant summoned in the grand order during B.C 2500. Similar to how Isthar is summoned, Ereshkigal is summoned in Babylonia as a Psudo-servant using the body of Rin Tohsaka. She is one of the Three Goddess Alliance who had an encounter with the Chaldea group and Ishtar when they try to retrieve Gilgamesh's soul from the underworld after his death of overwork. She later assists the heroes to defeat Tiamat by dragging the Beast to the underworld in order to give Chaldea the chance to attack. She returned in Salomon chapter and participated in the final battle.
Rider (ライダー, Raidā) / Ruler (ルーラー, Rūrā) – Quetzalcoatl (ケツァル・コアトル, Ketsaru Koatoru)
Voiced by: Aya Endō (Japanese); Gloria Garayua (English)
Appearing in Babylonia as an ally, Quetzalcoatl is a Rider-Class servant summoned in the grand order during B.C 2500. Considered to be a Divine Spirit in origin, she was summoned as a Pseudo-servant using an unknown individual for her appearance. Known to be laid back and also enigmatic and cheerful, as well having an interest on lucha libre. She is one of members of the Three Goddesses Alliance that attacks Uruk. But she was defeated by Ritsuka's group, which in turn, lets her to be their ally.
Lancer (ランサー, Ransā) – Jaguar Man (ジャガーマン, Jagā Man)
Voiced by: Miki Itō (Japanese); Julie Ann Taylor (English)
Appearing in Babylonia as an ally, Jaguar Man is a Lancer-Class servant summoned in the grand order during B.C 2500. Like any other Pseudo-servants, she was summoned using the body of Taiga Fujiwara, and retaining its comedic characteristics and personality. She serves as Quetzalcoatl's aide and retainer.

==== Miscellaneous ====
Berserker (バーサーカー, Bāsākā) / Lancer (ランサー, Ransā) – Ibaraki Douji (茨木童子, Ibaraki Dōji)
Voiced by: Nao Tōyama (Japanese); Abby Trott (English)
Appearing first in the Rashoumon event and later in Babylonia as a mentioned character, later in Hell Realm Mandala as an antagonist, Ibaraki Douji is a Berserker-Class servant summoned in the grand order during B.C 2500. Known to have a personality comparable to a young girl, she is shown to be haughty and can argue at some people at times. This one reason alone is what made her abandon her role on defending Uruk and becoming a leader of a group of bandits in the mountains of Babylonia. In reality, she did that in order to stop Humbaba from joining the Three Goddess Aliance. She later appeared in the Heian Lostbelt as one of the singularity's main enemies, siding with Shuten Douji.
Assassin (アサシン, Asashin) – Mysterious Heroine X (謎のヒロインX, Nazo no Hiroin X) / Foreigner (フォーリナー, Fōrinā) – Mysterious Heroine XX (謎のヒロインXX, Nazo no Hiroin XX)
Voiced by: Ayako Kawasumi (Japanese); Kari Wahlgren (English)
First appearing in the Saber Wars event and later in Salomon as an ally, Mysterious Heroine X is an Assassin-Class servant summoned in the grand order during A.D 2016. Almost resembling Altria Pendragon, she is a mysterious figure who arrived in Chaldea, coming from an alternate universe named "Servant Universe" and having a goal of exterminating all people who looks like her and all Saber-class Servants. She claims to be a Saber-class, however, Chaldea classify her as an Assassin-class Servant. She also participated in Salomon chapter and later in the 2018 Summer Event as a Foreigner-Class servant tasked on hunting down a new Foreigner Servant in Hawaii.
Avenger (アヴェンジャー, Avenjā) – Edmond Dantès (エドモン・ダンテス, Edomon Dantesu) / Le Comte de Monte Cristo (モンテ・クリスト伯爵, Monte Kurisuto Hakushaku)
Voiced by: Nobunaga Shimazaki (Japanese); Griffin Puatu (English)
First appearing in the Prison Tower event and later in both Salomon and Id as an ally / antagonist, Edmond Dantès is an Avenger-Class servant summoned in the grand order during A.D 2016. Known also as The Count of Monte Cristo, he serves as Ritsuka's ally in the Event to get rid of the Evil Eye curse Solomon has put on him. Despite being an Avenger, he has a strong sense of justice and was very supportive to Ritsuka at times especially in his nightmares where he frequently appears. He later appears on Solomon as an ally and at the very end of the Shinjuku sub singularity to help Ritsuka to defeat James Moriarty.
Edmond became the main instigator of the Id Ordeal Call in order for Ritsuka to understand the purpose of the Avenger-class servants in the greater Human Order, constructing a replica of Tokyo in his mind and relieving his traumatizing moments. It is also his plan to lure in the last Foreign God Apostle inside in order for him to be taken out once and for all. After the ordeal, he and the other Avenger servants temporarily severed their link to Ritsuka and departed to Antarctica, in which the former Chaldea Security Organization is in order to resolve the last injustice lingering there.

=== Epic of Remnant ===
==== Shinjuku ====
Archer (アーチャー, Āchā) – EMIYA Alter (エミヤ・オルタ, Emiya Oruta)
Voiced by: Junichi Suwabe
Appearing in Shinjuku as an ally and later in SERAPH as an antagonist, EMIYA Alter is an Archer-Class servant summoned in the remnant grand order during A.D 1999. This version of EMIYA was different from the counter guardian summoned in the 5th Holy Grail War nor the Nameless servant that appeared in the Moon Cell, but a corrupted being he adapts to the "mind of steel" way to serve justice at the cost of his body. He was hired by Holmes to infiltrate Moriarty's side and help defeat Demon Pillar Baal but later disappears after helping Artoria Alter destroy a meteor falling on the city. He is later involved during the SE.RA.PH chapter, where he revealed that he slaughtered Kiara's cult.

==== Agartha ====
Saber (セイバー, Seibā) – Chevalier d'Eon (シュヴァリエ・デオン, Shuvarie Deon)
Voiced by: Chiwa Saito (Japanese); Erica Lindbeck (English)
Appearing in Agartha as an ally, Chevalier d'Eon is a Saber-Class servant summoned in the remnant grand order during A.D 2000. Known to be a good spy, D'Eon fights with both pen and sword and is a "man who can be a woman and a woman who can be a man", due to their crossdressing nature. They were first summoned back in Orleans by Jeanne Alter, serving her army as a Berserker Saber. They then later appeared in Agartha as an ally to Ritsuka.
Saber (セイバー, Seibā) – Fergus mac Róich (フェルグス・マック・ロイ, Ferugusu Makku Roi)
Voiced by: Takaya Kuroda (Japanese); Kaiji Tang (Fate/Extra Last Encore), Daman Mills (Fate/Grand Carnival) (English)
Appearing in Agartha as an ally, Fergus mac Róich is a Saber-Class servant summoned in the remnant grand order during A.D 2000. He first appeared during the 5th singularity as one of the Celtic Servants summoned by Medb. He later returned in Agartha chapter as a story-only Servant, with his age regressed back to that of a young boy after being modified by Scheherazade. Throughout the singularity, he holds a key factor in the destruction of Agartha.

==== Shimousa ====
Saber (セイバー, Seibā) / Berserker (バーサーカー, Bāsākā) – Miyamoto Musashi (宮本武蔵)
Voiced by: Ayane Sakura
Appearing in Shimousa as an ally, Miyamoto Musashi is a Saber-Class servant summoned in the remnant grand order during A.D 1630. However, this Musashi is unlike its real-like counterpart as she came from another dimension after the fall of the Quantum Time-Locks, and claims to be the Miyamoto Musashi of that world. Her full name is Shinmen Musashi-no-Kami Fujiwara no Harunobu (新免武蔵守藤原玄信, Shinmen Musashi-no-Kami Fujiwara no Harunobu). She has been the target of several assassins, who were servants being corrupted by Ashiya Doman during their summoning. After the conclusion of the singularity due to the real life Mushashi's death, she was summoned at the present timeline, where she wanders the world. She also appears during the Cosmos in the Lostbelt chapters as an ally before her heroic sacrifice during the events of Olympus after using her Noble Phantasm to seal off Chaos.
Saber (セイバー, Seibā) / Alter Ego (アルターエゴ, Arutā Ego) – Senji Muramasa (千子村正, Senji Muramasa)
Voiced by: Noriaki Sugiyama
Appearing in Shimousa as an ally, later antagonist, Senji Muramasa is a servant summoned in the remnant grand order during A.D 1630. Like other servants, he is summoned as a Psudo-Servant using the body of Shirou Emiya and was classified as a Saber-Class servant. However, Muramasa claims that he is not qualified to be a Heroic Spirit because as a blacksmith, he lacks the heroic deeds necessary to make him a hero. It is for that reason he is manifested as a Pseudo-Servant in a suitable human body yet unknown if he is a Heroic Spirit Candidate, Wraith, Phantom, or some other subset of spirit. His summoning is due to Shirou having a similar body and mind to that of Muramasa's and he believes he shared his way of life and experienced a similar end. It also been suggested by other characters that Shirou is possibly his descendant. During his encounter with Astraea, she asked him about his opposition to servants opposing them as he replied being a servant may be convenient, but he cannot choose his master.
He serves as an ally during the events of Shimousa and later summoned by the Foreign God prior to the events of Cosmos in the Lostbelt as an Alter Ego servant to cut down Atlas in preparation for the Foreign God's arrival. He later became a major ally in Lostbelt 6 after his failed assassination of Morgan and is captured to be sold on an auction. It took Ritsuka and Artoria to finally set him free in which he has no choice but to side with them. Muramasa then died when he decided to forge Excalibur for Chaldea in cost of his life while severing his bond with the Foreign God.
Assassin (アサシン, Asashin) – Fūma Kotarō (風魔小太郎)
Voiced by: Natsuki Hanae (Japanese); Max Mittelman (English)
Appearing in Shimousa as an ally, Fūma Kotarō is an Assassin-Class servant summoned in the remnant grand order during A.D 1630. His personality was both compassionate and discreet; thus it was said that, while his body was a summit as a shinobi, his mentality was not fit for a shinobi and he spent his days secluded in his room. He was first summoned way back in Babylonia alongside Amakusa but both were killed during the attack on Uruk. He is then summoned in Shimosa as an ally and aid to Musashi and Ritsuka.

==== Salem ====
Caster (キャスター, Kyasutā) – Queen of Sheba (シバの女王, Shiba no Joō)
Voiced by: Satomi Sato
Appearing in Salem as an ally and enemy, Queen of Sheba is a Caster-Class servant summoned in the remnant grand order during A.D 1692. Known also as "Caster of Midrash" (ミドラーシュのキャスター, Midorāshu no Kyasutā), she is a stray servant who is forced to take the identity of the native slave Tituba and later accused of being a witch and executed. However, she is later revealed to be alive and assists the Chaldea group since that point. She was somewhat shown to be more of a money digger, who thrives on prosperous business.
Caster (キャスター, Kyasutā) – Circe (キルケー, Kirukē)
Voiced by: Himika Akaneya
Appearing in Salem as an ally, Circe is a Caster-Class servant summoned in the remnant grand order during A.D 1692. Known also as "Caster of Okeanos" (オケアノスのキャスター, Okeanosu no Kyasutā), she was summoned prior to the events of game, although she refused to work with Chaldea and remains hidden until she decided to cooperate. She had accompanied Ritsuka's group in the remnant singularity disguised as Medea herself in her place, much to her dismay.
Assassin (アサシン, Asashin) – Mata Hari (マタ・ハリ)
Voiced by: Risa Taneda
Appearing in Salem as an ally, Mata Hari is an Assassin-Class servant summoned in the lostbelt grand order during A.D 1692. Exceedingly cheerful and maternal. No matter how old one is, Mata Hari will treat one as a "child" if one is of the opposite sex. However, she herself shuns her fleeting fate of having no fortune. She first appeared in the Salem chapter as one of the servant who investigate the first appearance of a Foreigner Servant. She is later summoned into the Tokugawa Labyrinth to resolve the disappearance of the members of Novum Chaldea after being reversed summoned into the singularity by Kama.
Lancer (ランサー, Ransā) – Nezha (哪吒, Nata)
Voiced by: Yui Ogura
Appearing in Salem as an ally, Nezha is a Lancer-Class servant summoned in the remnant grand order during A.D 1692. Once known to be arrogant and bratty, she once hated her past self and was reincarnated to be stoic in a much more poetic matter. She became an ally prior to the events of Salem and later made an appearance in the Third and Fourth Lostbelts as a main ally.

==== Miscellaneous ====
Berserker (バーサーカー, Bāsākā) – Paul Bunyan (ポール・バニヤン, Pōru Baniyan) / Alter Ego (アルターエゴ, Arutā Ego) – Super Bunyan (スーパーバニヤン, Supā Baniyan)
Voiced by: Chiaki Omigawa (Bunyan), Rie Takahashi (Funny Rider), Madoka Yonezawa (Funny Assassin)
Appearing in the All the Statesmen event as an Ally, Paul Bunyan is a Berserker-Class Servant summoned in the remnant grand order during A.D 2017. Although a parody servant, she is not considered close to that of a "Divine Spirit" or a god and cannot be summoned by any means. As such, she is considered a Phantom born from early rumors regarding the development of the American Pioneer, nothing more than an oft-repeated urban legend. She was created by the Master with No Name using the black mud from the Greater Grail mixed with Udon Dough, in line of thinking was that due to Bunyan's legend including the "common legends of mankind's creator deities", the creation of an "artificial deity that contains godly elements" would be possible in lieu of summoning an actual god. However, she turned out to be useless and she was later abandoned only to be found by Chaldea. When she found out her true origins and cannot accept her destructive urges, she was rescued by Chaldea and due to the destruction of Holy Grail inside her body, allowed her to be registered to the Throne of Heroes, becoming a permanent Heroic Servant and ally.

=== Cosmos in the Lostbelt ===
==== Anastasia ====
Avenger (アヴェンジャー, Avenjā) – Antonio Salieri (アントニオ・サリエリ, Antonio Sarieri)
Voiced by: Toshihiko Seki
Appearing in Anastasia as both an antagonist and later an ally, Antonio Salieri is an Avenger-Class servant summoned in the lostbelt grand order during A.D 1570. First appearing in the story posing as Amadeus Alter, he worked with the Lostbelt King: Ivan the Terrible until he crossed paths with the surviving members of Chaldea. He's shown to be an excellent assassin, who follows his Master's orders and promptly brings down the target. But he also possessed deep hatred towards Mozart, seeing how their relationship in history goes. During the final battle with Ivan, he used his musical prowess, playing Mozart's most prestige musical piece "Dies Irae" to support Chaldea in battle.
Paxti (パツシィ, Patsushii)
A male wolf-like creature that the team of Chaldea encountered during their time in the first Lostbelt. He is classified as a Yaga, lupine-like creatures who were once human and had their bodies modified into the said form to survive the frozen world Ivan had created. He serves as an ally until his demise.

==== Götterdämmerung ====
Archer (アーチャー, Āchā) – Napoleon Bonaparte (ナポレオン・ボナパルト, Naporeon Bonaparuto)
Voiced by: Satoshi Hino (Japanese); Mark Allen Jr. (English)
Appearing in Götterdämmerung as an ally, Napoleon is an Archer-Class servant summoned in the lostbelt grand order during B.C. 1000. Shown to be very manlike and tall, his summoning in the archer class is due to dislike on his height, and that he wishes it will never be summoned as a Rider. Napoleon is also shown to be a man of his words, a very noble person who responds to expectations and wishes, responds to desires, and accomplishes what needs to be done. He soon perished in the losbelt when he used his Noble Phantasm against Surtr and dealing a heavy blow to the giant at the cost of his life and freeing Ophelia from its curse.
Alter Ego (アルターエゴ, Arutā Ego) – Sitonai (シトナイ, Shitonai)
Voiced by: Mai Kadowaki (Japanese); Stephanie Sheh (English)
Appearing in Götterdämmerung as an ally, Sitonai is an Alter Ego-Class servant summoned in the lostbelt grand order during B.C. 1000. Similar to any Psudo-Servants, she is summoned with the divine spirits of Sitonai, Louhi and Freyja within the body of Illyasviel von Einzbern. She retains some of Illya's personality and also appearance, but is also has traits from the three divine spirits fused to her. In other words: she is a girl who shows a pure smile. However, that smile hides a great cruelty. She first appeared in the lostbelt, held prisoner by Scáthach-Skaði until Chaldea helped her escape, and later assisted them on taking down the Lostbelt King.

==== S I N ====
Rider (ライダー, Raidā) – Red Hare (赤兎馬, Sekitoba)
Voiced by: Hikaru Midorikawa (Japanese); Grant George (English)
Appearing in S I N as an ally, Red Hare is a Rider-Class servant summoned in the lostbelt grand order during B.C. 0210. Though it is a strange case, there are certain conditions that the steed of the famed Lu Bu can be summoned as a servant and even treated as strange case towards the members of Chaldea. He usually do not get along with Chen Gong, however he tries hard to follow orders.
Caster (キャスター, Kyasutā) – Chen Gong (陳宮, Chinkyū)
Voiced by: Madono Mitsuaki
Appearing in S I N as an ally, Chen Gong is a Caster-Class servant summoned in the lostbelt grand order during B.C. 0210. He was shown to be a very successful and cunning tactician, but also a sadist who calms Lu Bu's stare. While accepting the other party's opinions and reasons fairy, "But I don't think so", he sometimes refuses and crushes them thoroughly. He looks like a ruthless machine in order to face the enemy without a human heart.

==== Yuga Kshetra ====
Moon Cancer (ムーン・キャンサー, Mūn Kyansā) – Ganesha (ガネーシャ, Ganēsha)
Voiced by: Aoi Yūki
Appearing in Yuga Kshetra as an ally, Ganesha is a Moon Cancer-Class servant summoned in the lostbelt grand order during 11900. Ganesha's class is more of a contested origin, as it may have to do with her Pseudo-Servant identification and that she was summoned using the body of Jinako Carigiri, who was involved in the Moon Cell Grail War. Despite that she's a divine spirit, she still has Jinako's somewhat laziness and her NEET-like persona. She is shown to have a good relationship to Karna.
Saber (セイバー, Seibā) – Lakshmibai (ラクシュミー・バーイー, Rakushumī Bāī)
Voiced by: Rina Sato
Appearing in Yuga Kshetra as an ally, Lakshmibai is a Saber-Class servant summoned in the lostbelt grand order during 11900. Though she did appear as a normal servant, she was summoned as a half-Psudo servant, with her saint graph fused with the Hindu Goddess Alakshmi. She joined Ritsuka's group during their time in the lostbelt with Rama developing a friendly relationship with her.

==== Atlantis / Olympus ====
Assassin (アサシン, Asashin) / Caster (キャスター, Kyasutā) – Charlotte Corday (シャルロット･コルデー, Sharurotto Korudē)
Voiced by: Yui Horie
Appearing in Atlantis as an ally, Charlotte Corday is an Assassin-Class servant summoned in the lostbelt grand order during BC 12000. Being a well trained assassin despite her beauty and innocence, she is also very kind and humble but also very cheerful. Despite that her fate in real life, she still retained her smile. She is summoned in the Lostbelt as a member of the New Argonauts commanded by Jason to take down Odysseus and his crew. It is later revealed that she is a servant summoned by Odysseus to serve as a mole to the Counter Force. During the final battle, she chose to kill Odysseus, with her dying in her wounds.
Archer (アーチャー, Āchā) – Paris (パリス, Parisu)
Voiced by: Yuka Terasaki
Appearing in Atlantis as an ally, Paris is an Archer-Class servant summoned in the lostbelt grand order during BC 12000. Thought the real Paris in history was older, his youthful appearance was in fact the result of the Greek god Apollo hijacking into his saint graph, changing his appearance to that of a child. Apollo himself took the form of the sheep that follows Paris around. In his current form, he is shown to be very courageous yet also very pure and innocent. Due to skills, he is also a very good archer. Paris is summoned in the Lostbelt as a member of the New Argonauts commanded by Jason to take down Odysseus and his crew. His life ended when he and Apollo became the arrow for Orion to use to take down Artemis from space.
Rider (ライダー, Raidā) – Mandricardo (マンドリカルド, Mandorikarudo)
Voiced by: Toshiki Masuda
Appearing in Atlantis as an ally, Mandricardo is a Rider-Class servant summoned in the lostbelt grand order during BC 12000. A rather laid-back figure, he is very jaded about his experiences about the world. Though being a minor player in the New Argonauts and worries about himself, he still does his part in a half-heartedly manner. He is summoned in the Lostbelt as a member of the New Argonauts commanded by Jason to take down Odysseus and his crew. His life ended when he used Achilles's shield to block off Artemis's attack from space, giving Orion the chance to shoot her down.
Rider (ライダー, Raidā) – Bartholomew Roberts (バーソロミュー・ロバーツ, Bāsoromyū Robātsu)
Voiced by: Chiaki Kobayashi
Appearing in Atlantis as an ally, Bartholomew Roberts is a Rider-Class servant summoned in the lostbelt grand order during BC 12000. He has a soft spot for women and men with peek-a-bangs, such as Mash. He is also rather polite and kind to everyone before and after he regains his memories, especially to Mash. He personally considers himself a "gallant man." It's to the point that even Ozymandias praises his nature. He first appeared during the "A Study in the Dubious Meiho-sou" event under the name Salazar, and that he was summoned for the purpose of partaking in a play but nothing comes of it. With no memory of even his own identity and lacking a purpose, he decides to await his own destruction. He had met the rest of Chaldea, who offer to let him partake in a play they're trying to film. But during filming on one scene, Roberts becomes deeply agitated when he hears the sound of cannon fire as his Spirit Origin rapidly changes until he becomes a giant ghost, forcing others to calm him down. Afterwards, he finally revealed to them his True Name to the group before his body begins to disintegrate. He tells Mash not to worry because he is but "a gallant who shoulders the fate to disappear along with this singularity." He adds that his Saint Graph was already in cinders but the fight completely burned it up. He also tells Ritsuka not to worry either. He does consider himself rude for leaving before the filming is complete, however.
As a final farewell, he thanks Ritsuka for giving him a meaningful role before his inevitable disappearance and departs with words of affection for Mash. Roberts later appeared in the Atlantis Lostbelt as a ship captain for the New Argonauts, and helped Novum Chaldea cross to the destined island in order to shoot down Artemis.
Ruler (ルーラー, Rūrā) – Astraea (アストライア, Asutoraia)
Voiced by: Shizuka Itō
Appearing in the Lady Reines' Case Files as an ally, later in Atlantis as an enemy, Astraea is a Ruler-Class servant summoned in the lostbelt grand order during BC 12000. As a psudo servant, Astraea is summoned in the lostbelt using the body of Luviagelita Edelfelt. As a goddess of justice, she doesn't usually take sides unless her choices were right. She is a person who was born to stand on a person, and accepts the authority of justice as her duty. Astraea first appeared in the Lady Reines' Case Files alongside Assassin Emiya to help Ritsuka regain his memories and solve the case in Patchwork London. She then appeared in Atlantis but never sided with either Zeus or the allied servants opposing them. When Ritsuka's group arrived in the island she's in to get info on how to get to Olympus, she fights them to prove their intentions weren't malicious as she though.
Rider (ライダー, Raidā) – Europa (エウロパ, Europa)
Voiced by: Mao Ichimichi
Appearing in Olympus as an enemy, later an ally, Europa is a Rider-Class servant summoned in the lostbelt grand order during BC 12000. During a civil war in that lostbelt leading to the extermination of some of the Olympian Gods, she herself fused with the spirit of Zeus's wife Hera, taking on her divine authority as a Goddess and allow Zeus to be with them both. Being a consort of Zeus, Europa views her children and grandchildren as her own. She also views all children born in Europe as her descendants. She also can command a giant automation as her familiar for her attacks. She appeared in Olympus as part of the pantheon of gods ruling the area alongside Wodime. She later sided with Ritsuka and the rest of Novum Chaldea to stop Zeus. She later perished alongside Adele and Macarios after Olympus collapsed.

==== Heian-kyō ====
Saber (セイバー, Seibā) – Watanabe no Tsuna (渡辺綱)
Voiced by: Kenji Akabane
Appearing in Heian-kyō as an antagonist, later ally, Watanabe no Tsuna is a master who lived on that lostbelt during A.D. 1008 and later becoming a heroic servant after his soul is registered into the Throne of Heroes as a Saber-Class Servant. He's shown to be a prim, straight-laced person. Though somewhat reserved, he can be sociable, and has become renowned as a cool and collected oni slayer. He appeared in the Heian-kyō as a human as one of Raikou's Four Heavenly Kings and also the master of Medea Lily, who once fought against Ritsuka and Kato Danzo before he became their ally on defeating Caster Limbo.
Caster (キャスター, Kyasutā) / Rider (ライダー, Raidā) – Murasaki Shikibu (紫式部)
Voiced by: Ai Kayano
Appearing in Heian-kyō as a side character, Murasaki Shikibu is a master who lived on that lostbelt during A.D. 1008 and later becoming a heroic servant after her soul is registered into the Throne of Heroes as a Caster-Class Servant. As a heroic servant, Murasaki attempts to portray an air of elegance, though she is quite clumsy. She deeply enjoys reading, especially books that were written outside of her native country and time. She resents the existence of digital books and prefers paper books. She also holds a fair amount of respect for fellow authors. She first appeared in the game's Valentine's Day 2018 event on which is she is the main focus of the plot. She then later appeared in Lostbelt 5.5 as the master of the Heroic Servant Charles Babbage.
Archer (アーチャー, Āchā) / Berserker (バーサーカー, Bāsākā) – Sei Shōnagon (清少納言)
Voiced by: Ai Fairouz
Appearing in Heian-kyō as a side character, Sei Shōnagon is a master who lived on that lostbelt during A.D. 1008 and later becoming a heroic servant after her soul is registered into the Throne of Heroes as an Archer-Class Servant. Also known as the "Sparkling Archer" (キラキラのアーチャー, Kira Kira no Āchā), Sei is always in a good mood but there are times where she suddenly feels down. Similar to a cat she can be fickle to her surroundings, however, for the most part she focuses on having fun more than anything else. She first appeared on the Valentine's 2020 Event as the main focused character in the event. Later she appeared in Lostbelt 5.5 as the master of Tamamo no Mae.

==== Avalon Le Fae ====
Caster (キャスター, Kyasutā) / Berserker (バーサーカー, Bāsākā) – Artoria Caster (アルトリア・キャスター, Arutoria Kyasutā)
Voiced by: Ayako Kawasumi (Japanese); Kari Wahlgren (English)
Appearing in Avalon Le Fae as an ally, Artoria Caster is a mage who lived in the British Lostbelt circa 2017 in the Queen Calendar. Unlike her Pan-Human counterpart, she is the version of Artoria Pendragon who was the "Child of Prophecy" chosen by the "Staff of Selection" rather than the "Sword of Selection" and prophesied to ring the six bells and overthrow the evil Queen Morgan, uniting both humans and fairies as King of Britain. Innocent and very energetic, Artoria has the figure of a perfectly commonplace girl who hates to lose, is strong in the face of criticism and adversity, values the surrounding atmosphere more than anything else, and hides her true feelings from everyone. However she become saddened about how her fate goes in her Pan-Human History counterpart. Even though she is the Child of Prophecy, Artoria's magical energy is lower than the average fairy. Her Divine Patterns are better than a human's Magic Circuits, but worse than a fairy's. Because of this, she is forced to compensate with Magecraft. She appeared in the lostbelt as one of the main ally of Ritsuka and Novum Chaldea, who were investigating the British Lostbelt.
When she finally rings the pilgrim's bells to truly become the Child of Prophecy, she then accepted her own destiny and fate. During the battle with Cernunos is where she used her abilities to an extent to damage and expose its core at the cost of her life before Mash and Ritsuka finished it off using the Black Barrel. At the battle against Oberon Vortigern, she is summoned into the Lostbelt as Artoria Avalon to assist Chaldea on finally defeating him.
Lancer (ランサー, Ransā) – Gareth (ガレス, Garesu)
Voiced by: Yūki Kuwahara
Appearing in Avalon Le Fae as an ally, Gareth is a fairy knight who lived in the British Lostbelt circa 2017 in the Queen Calendar. In the Pan-Human History, she is one of the thirteen Knights of the Round Table, holding the seventh seat. She is also one of Morgan's children, making Mordred her half-sister. Gareth highly reveres Lancelot. She seems to normally have a sunny, friendly disposition while also being brave and faithful like a small puppy. Once she has grown attached to someone, she will never betray no matter what. She was first mentioned back at the Camelot Singularity as one of the knights of the Goddess Rhongomyniad, who had later died in battle against the knights that were against the Lion King. She then later appeared in the 6th lostbelt as a fairy knight allying Ritsuka and Novum Chaldea and confirmed she doesn't know what type of fairy she is and belongs to no clans, but ever since she was born she has been wandering with a purpose in her heart. She is later slain by Morgan's army after an attack in Londinium.
Lancer (ランサー, Ransā) – Percival (パーシヴァル, Pāshivuaru)
Voiced by: Masaya Matsukaze
Appearing in Avalon La Fae as an ally, Percival is a knight who lived in the British Lostbelt circa 2017 in the Queen Calendar. In the Pan-Human History, he is one of the thirteen Knights of the Round Table, holding the second seat. His lostbelt version wields the Spear of Selection given to him by the fairy who took him in. It used to be Tonelico's Staff of Selection but has lost much of its power. As a knight, he is sincere and values decorum. On other occasions he has been described as pure-hearted. He acts calmly, without doubting or losing his temper at others. It is during battle that he shows a harsher side of himself. But only during battle. He was first mentioned back at the Camelot Singularity as one of the knights of the Goddess Rhongomyniad, who had later died in battle against the knights that were against the Lion King. He then later appeared in the 6th lostbelt as a knight who leads the Round Table Army against Queen Morgan in Londinium. He is later slain during the fight against the Red Calamity Dragon of Albion's Remnant.
Pretender (プリテンダー, Puritendā) – Oberon Vortigern (オベロン・ヴォーティガーン, Oberon Vōtigān)
Voiced by: Toshiyuki Toyonaga
Appearing in Avalon Le Fae as an ally, later as the true antagonist of Lostbelt 6, Oberon is a Pretender-Class servant summoned in the lostbelt grand order during Queen Calendar 2017. Allegedly summoned by the Human Order to assist Ritsuka Fujimaru in the English Lostbelt. However, Tamamo Vitch and Muryan suspect that he is not from Proper Human History, nor is he even a Servant. Artoria Caster describes Oberon as very Merlin-esque, and has a very cheerful personality. He also do things that aren't normal because he thinks it fits the narrative. He appeared in the British Lostbelt as part of the Round Table Army, a coalition of human and fairy rebels against Morgan led by Percival. Allegedly died during the siege in Camelot, he then shown his true colors after the collapse of the British Lostbelt and revealed to Novum Chaldea his true identity. His true identity is the Will of Britain, Vortigern, summoned about 2000 years ago in the lostbelt before Chaldea's arrival. Despite being weak, he is nursed back to health by the childlike fairies of Wales who had mistaken him for a prince and gave him a new identity of Oberon to stabilize his Saint Graph. When his memories had returned after the battle in Wales, he decided to orchestrate the fall of the Lostbelt and let Chaldea do all the work before he revealed to them and almost destroyed the group.
His own goal was to destroy the British Lostbelt and then destroy Pan-Human History once the deed was done. It was after Artoria Avalon was summoned that he is foiled and been defeated by Novum Chaldea themselves. In his defeat, Chaldea realized his goal was done yet congratulated them on doing the deed for him, blessing them in their next journey as he dies with the Lostbelt. After the incident, he was now recorded as Novum Chaldea's first ever Pretender-Class Servant.

==== Tunguska Sanctuary ====
Rider (ライダー, Raidā) – Taigong Wang (太公望, Taikōbō)
Voiced by: Tomoaki Maeno
Appearing in the Tunguska Sanctuary as an ally, Taigong Wang is a Rider-Class servant summoned in the lostbelt grand order during A.D. 2018. He was summoned into the lostbelt by the Counter Force on behalf of Noah to investigate Koyanskaya and her plans to become a full-pledged beast. He was motivated to meet Daji again in his hunt, but to everyone's surprise, Koyanskaya was a completely different person than the one he knew. Although Taigong Wang also qualifies for the Caster class, he claims that had he been summoned in that form he would have definitely been a Grand Caster. Also pondering about the possibility of claiming the status of Grand Rider, the exact veracity of his claims are unknown. He claims that as a fellow Grand, he has learned a great many things of Noah. Although may not be good as Noah, he is still a direct disciple of Lord Yuanshi Tianzun. Alongside Nikitich, he helped Novum Chaldea navigate over the lostbelt in order to face against her one final time. After Koyanskaya became Beast IV/L, Taigong Wang used some of his abilities to assist them with his skills on taking her down. When Koyanskaya is defeated, he used a special spell he learned from the Grand Rider itself to send Koyanskaya back to the cosmos, ending the conflict.
Rider (ライダー, Raidā) – Dobrynya Nikitich (ドブルイニャ・ニキチッチ, Doburuinya Nikichitchi)
Voiced by: Mayu Mineda
Appearing in the Tunguska Sanctuary as an ally, Dobrynya Nikitich is a Rider-Class servant summoned in the lostbelt grand order during A.D. 2018. Despite being called by her summoned name, she is actually Dobrynya's wife Nastasia, who has manifested using his Saint Graph, similar to Artemis using Orion's, who has appeared in the world while disguising her real True Name. A young warrior unreservedly filled with self-confidence, she is very headstrong who insists that she can do almost anything and will rush into action once she has decided what she must do: Quick of judgment and entirely unwavering. Alongside Taigong Wang, she was summoned into the lostbelt to help Novum Chaldea navigate over to face against Koyanskaya one final time.

==== Traum ====
Lancer (ランサー, Ransā) – Don Quixote (ドン・キホーテ, Don Kihōte)
Voiced by: Nobuo Tobita (Don Quixote), Satomi Arai (Sancho Panza)
Appearing in Traum as an ally, Don Quixote is a Lancer-Class servant summoned in the lostbelt grand order during A.D. XX17. Don Quixote is a composite servant, composed of himself and Sancho Panza, who is a phantom servant composing of his "squire", his horse Rocinante, Altisidora the prankster girl, and his imaginary princess Dulcinea del Toboso. As Don Quixote, he appears a lot shorter than any other servants, while he's not the type to listen to what others have to say, but that doesn't make him any less of the archetypal kind and loyal knight, always courteous to women, always protecting the weak and challenging the strong. Sancho on the other hand, she always follows Don Quixote around with a smile, as an all-purpose maid granting his every wish. That said, she has this mighty graceful way of turning down her lord, which does wonders to prevent situations. Both of them first appeared in Atlantis, who was originally part of Nikola Tesla's Servant army fighting the Olympians before Novum Chaldea arrived in the Greek Lostbelt. But when all of his allies died including Heracles, he and Sancho fled from fear and ended up in the Traum Singularity, ruling over the Via Regia Realm, one of the three factions. He pretends to be Karl der Große, supposed to only hold the position until the real Karl appears. Astolfo and Roland are in on his charade, though the army thinks he's the real Karl. Haunted by guilt for what he did in Atlantis, Don Quixote chooses to stay and fight this time and battles Constantine XI. He is easily overpowered, but even so does not give up. When he is about to die Charlemagne arrives to save him.
Ruler (ルーラー, Rūrā) – Pope Johanna (女教皇ヨハンナ, Jokyōkō Yohanna)
Voiced by: Natsumi Hioka
Lancer (ランサー, Ransā) – Bradamante (ブラダマンテ, Buradamante)
Voiced by: Chitose Morinaga
Saber (セイバー, Seibā) – Roland (ローラン, Rōran)
Voiced by: Takuma Terashima
Appearing in Traum as an ally, Roland is a Saber-Class servant summoned in the lostbelt grand order during A.D. XX17. Roland is thought by others to be a pervert along with Astolfo, but Astolfo describes him as being "into kinky stuff like handcuffs" in comparison to himself who enjoys being part of a scandal. Strong and unyielding yet Noble with a refreshing smile. A noble paladin with no interest in wealth, abiding under the love and honor of God. He will respond civilly to civility, even if it comes from an opponent, and rudeness will be met with trembling rage. He's a hot-blooded man who will stand and shout at any unjust situation. But sometimes his love-life tends to drive him mad, and he gets naked on occasion. He first appeared in Astolfo's interlude story, who himself caused some trouble in the Orleans Singularity. He then later appeared in Traum as one of the knights of the Via Regia Realm alongside Astolfo under Karl der Große.
Alter Ego (アルターエゴ, Arutā Ego) – Xu Fu (徐福, Jofuku)
Voiced by: Misaki Watada
Appearing in Traum as an ally, Xu Fu is an Alter Ego-Class servant summoned in the lostbelt grand order during A.D. XX17. She is fond with Yu Mei-ren, which is shown by the plush toy she has of her. What she wants is to see her happy, which originally just meant finding out a way for her to end her own life if she wanted to. The entire purpose of her expedition was to find a way to end Consort Yu's life rather than a search for immortality. Xu Fu also seems visibly jealous of the protagonist, who is affectionately called "Kouhai" by Yu Mei-ren. She first appeared in the "Chaldea Thriller Night" event as the main instigator of the event, and served as the main antagonist of the said singularity. She later appeared in the Traum Singularity as one of the advisers of Karl der Große of the Via Regia Realm.
Berserker (バーサーカー, Bāsākā) – Salome (サロメ, Sarome)
Voiced by: Sarah Emi Bridcutt
Appearing in Traum as an ally, Salome is a Berserker-Class servant summoned in the lostbelt grand order during A.D. XX17. Salome's a crazy girl who falls in love and kisses with her bloody lips. As a Berserker Class Servant, her love is servile, dedicated to John the Baptist, and overflowing with generosity. She correctly understands the relationship between master and servant. But once she has deepened her ties and become intimate, she will want to "own" the master. She appeared in the Traum Singularity as part of the Revenge Realm under the rule of Kriemhild. She did once wanted to torture Ritsuka who was once caught by the faction until her change of heart allowed her to free him in his capture alongside the help from spies from the Regalia Realm. However, she is then killed by Sugitani Zenjūbō, being shot twice.

==== Nahui Mictlan ====
Foreigner (フォーリナー, Fōrinā) – Kukulkan (ククルカン, Kukurukan)
Voiced by: Ayaka Suwa
Appearing in Nahui Mictlan as an ally, Salome is a Foreigner-Class servant summoned in the lostbelt grand order during B.C.????. Kukulkan is the Lostbelt King of the South American Lostbelt, originally existed as part of ORT 66 Million years ago after it impacted the Earth prior to modern day in the Lostbelt, causing enough damage to it that it went inactive for 60 million years. Reactivating 6 million years before, it was battled by the Ka'an Kingdom, eventuality culminating in its king Camazotz turning immortal and battling ORT until he could tear out its heart. The heart became the new sun of Mictlan which was later worshipped by the Deinos after Daybit arrived in the Lostbelt which she came into being. She also intruded in the fight between U-Olga Marie and Novum Chaldea, causing both parties to crash land into the lostbelt and for U-Olga Marie to lose her memories. Later on she became an ally to Novum Chaldea in order to stop Daybit's plans in reawakening ORT. However when even Novum Chaldea had a hard time fighting against ORT on its multiple forms and later its Grand Foreigner form, she had chosen to sacrifice herself as she herself is a part of ORT, preventing it from resurrecting once more.
Tepeu (テペウ)
Voiced by: Ryōsuke Kanemoto
Tepeu is a Deino who appeared in Nahui Mictlan as an ally. He used to live in Chichen Itza like most deinos, but his superior intellect made him an outcast with his people. In addition, he avoided death at the hands of the many assassins sent by the priest Vucub. Due to this near-death experience, Tepeu would gain the Mystic Eyes of Death Perception. Although he is capable of combat, Tepeu will assume a non-combatant role in order to preventing himself from killing due to his abilities.

=== Ordeal Call ===
==== Paper Moon ====
Berserker (バーサーカー, Bāsākā) – Duryodhana (ドゥリーヨダナ, Durīyodana)
Voiced by: Kento Fujinuma
Lancer (ランサー, Ransā) – Bhima (ビーマ, Bīma)
Voiced by: Takuya Eguchi

==== Id ====
Avenger (アヴェンジャー, Avenjā) – Marie Antoinette Alter (マリー・アントワネット オルタ, Marī Antowanetto Oruta)
Voiced by: Risa Taneda
Assassin (アサシン, Asashin) – Hassan of the Shining Star (耀星のハサン, Yōsei no Hasan)
Voiced by: KENN

==== Archetype Inception ====
Berserker (バーサーカー, Bāsākā) – Mysterious Heroine X Alter (謎のヒロインX オルタ, Nazo no Hiroin X Oruta) / Foreigner (フォーリナー, Fōrinā) – Mysterious Heroine XX Alter (謎のヒロインXX オルタ, Nazo no Hiroin XX Oruta)
Voiced by: Ayako Kawasumi

==== Trinity Metatronius ====
Pretender (プリテンダー, Puritendā) – Dante Alighieri (ダンテ・アリギエーリ, Dante Arigiēri)
Voiced by: Shōya Chiba

=== Miscellaneous ===
Lancer (ランサー, Ransā) – Parvati (パールヴァティー, Pāruvatī)
Voiced by: Noriko Shitaya
Appearing in the Tokugawa Labrynth Event as an ally, Parvati is a Lancer-Class servant summoned in the lostbelt grand order during A.D. 1651. Parvati is classified as a Psudo-Servant, with her summoned into the body of Sakura Matou from the 5th Holy Grail War. She has a docile personality, she is not timid and has a strong inner self. She is summoned into the Tokugawa Labyrinth, sharing the same body with Lady Kasuga to resolve the disappearance of the members of Novum Chaldea after being reversed summoned into the singularity by Kama.
Foreigner (フォーリナー, Fōrinā) – Clytie Van Gogh (クリュティエ = ヴァン・ゴッホ, Kuryutie Van Gohho)
Voiced by: Karin Takahashi
Appearing in the Imaginary Scramble Event as an ally, Clytie Van Gogh is a Foreigner-Class servant summoned in the lostbelt grand order during A.D. 2018. Unlike other foreigner servants, Clytie Van Gogh is a composite servant created by the Evil God of Flowers by fusing the saint graph of the Greek water nymph Clytie with the memories of the original Van Gogh. Her creation is done due to the real Van Gogh committed suicide after rejecting an outer god's offer to help him. Like the real Van Gogh, despite the fusion of two Heroic Spirits, is exactly like the real person with its personalities intact. She tends to alternate between gentle solemnity, painful depression, and deranged laughter, to both a terrifying and heartbreaking degree. She appears in the Imaginary Scramble as an ally of Novum Chaldea after getting lost into the Imaginary Deep Sea alongside Captain Nemo and other servants. However at the end of their investigation and defeating the Outer God that influenced her, the Grail inside her was stolen by Yang. With his help, they retrieved the grail and defeated the other Foreigner servants off their otherworldly influences. She later became a member of Novum Chaldea after the incident.
Saber (セイバー, Seibā) – Sétanta (セタンタ, Setanta)
Voiced by: Ayumu Murase
Appearing in Avalon Le Fae as a mentioned character, Sétanta is a Saber-Class servant summoned in the lostbelt grand order circa 2017 in the Queen Calendar. A naive feral boy who is Bright and active, Sétanta acts before worrying about things. However, because of the education he received thoroughly from his foster father Fergus and his teacher Scáthach, he also possesses the aspect of an honours student who properly abides by the courtesy that should be displayed towards one's superiors and adults... But he is free-spirited when no one is looking. Towards his Master, Sétanta treats them like a familiar friend. Towards someone with an age close to his, this is his best way of dealing with someone as far as he is concerned. He was first mentioned in the main game during Avalon Le Fae, implied that the fairy who Odin possessed 5,000 years ago and went by the alias Grímr the Wise was the British Lostbelt version of Sétanta. He is described as a mischievous 14-year-old boy with a sword, and when Habetrot later meets Cú Chulainn Caster, she thinks he is Grímr. He later appeared in Fate/Grand Order Arcade as one of the game's playable servants.
Rider (ライダー, Raidā) – Noah (ノア, Noa) / Noah Zohar (ノア・ゾーハル, Noa Zōharu)
Voiced by: Yumiri Hanamori
Appearing in the Tunguska Sanctuary as a mentioned character, Noah is a Rider-Class servant exclusive to Fate/Grand Order Arcade, summoned in the Revelation Belt during D.C 2655. In the main story, Taigong mentioned that he learned a lot of skills from him as a fellow servant, as he holds the rank of "Grand Rider" (グランドアーチャー, Gurando Raidā). Though he said his skills aren't as good as Noah's, he claims that as a fellow Grand, he has learned a great many things of him. He also prefers the company of animals as opposed to humans, making her like him as she's part fox. Mentioned only in the main game during the Tunguska Sanctuary, he fully appears in Fate/Grand Order Arcade during the Babylon Revelation Belt. He is cooperating with Chaldea in the form of an adult version of Nemo, but it is a temporary form. He says that shortly after he was summoned, he was defeated by Beast VI/S and nearly died, but was saved from extinction by borrowing the spirit of a Nameless Servant. He later appeared in Lilim Harlot to fully assist Chaldea while summoning Arthur Pendragon to counter against Beast VI/S.

== Antagonists ==
=== Observer at the Timeless Temple ===
Avenger (アヴェンジャー, Avenjā) / Berserker (バーサーカー, Bāsākā) / Lancer (ランサー, Ransā) – Jeanne Alter (ジャンヌ・オルタ, Jannu Oruta)
Voiced by: Maaya Sakamoto (Japanese); Erika Harlacher (English)
The first antagonist appearing in Orleans, Jeanne Alter is an Avenger-Class servant summoned during A.D. 1431. Known mainly as the Dragon Witch, she is summoned from the Holy Grail as the vengeful spirit that Gilles de Rais envisioned Jeanne d'Arc to be after her death. She shares the opposite trait as that to original Jeanne as she hates the people who condemned her as a sacrilege and was both evil and vengeful towards the people of France. Also as such, she was also very close to Gilles. Throughout the Singularity, she appears as a Ruler-Class servant, but it was to conceal her true Saint Graph identity as an Avenger-Class. After she was defeated, she has already set in stone the fruits of her plan to engrave the existence as a Heroic servant. She later appears in Shinjuku as an ally.
In Fate/Samurai Remnant, she appears as a Lancer-class servant under the command of Chiemon.
Lancer (ランサー, Ransā) – Romulus (ロムルス, Romurusu) / Romulus-Quirinus (ロムルス = クィリヌス, Romurusu-Kwirinusu)
Voiced by: Ryōtarō Okiayu (Japanese); Bill Butts (English)
Appearing in Septem as an antagonist, Romulus is a Lancer-class servant summoned in the grand order during A.D 0060. Being a superhuman, his composure and presence, and his nature is that of Rome itself, which rules the world. He is also very kind to his own people, and has an air of composure around him, but he abandons himself in a blood frenzy to some degree and forgets about himself when he is well into battle. However, he has some traits of him that is shown in some berserkers. He is summoned in the Septem by Lev, who tried to convince him to use the Holy Grail to destroy the era. However, Romulus rejects Lev's offer as he had absolutely no desire in destroying Rome. Eventually, he with the other Roman emperors summoned by Lev formed the United Roman Empire with him as the leader. He is soon confronted by Nero and Chaldea's group in the palace, where he meets his demise.
Another version of Romulus is later summoned during the events of the fifth lostbelt Olympus through the "Godbreaker Spell Protocol", using Caligula as a catalyst for his forthcoming. In this form, he took on the name of Romulus-Quirinus, which is based on the lore of his "disappearance" at Quirinal Hill to which after then, Romans has thought that he had ascended into a god. In his summoning, he's given the title of "Grand Lancer" (グランドランサー, Gurando Ransā) and became a temporary ally of Novum Chaldea, in order to fight against Zeus as well as giving up his title by powering up Musashi to seal away Chaos.
Berserker (バーサーカー, Bāsākā) – Caligula (カリギュラ, Karigyura)
Voiced by: Tsuruoka Satoshi
Appearing in Septem as an antagonist and later in Olympus as an ally, Caligula is a Berserker-class servant summoned in the grand order during A.D 0060. Similar to how history depicted him, Caligula is a total sadist, seeking to perform atrocities and misdeeds upon all enemies who catch his eye. He is completely unmanageable due to Mad Enhancement, removing any means of self-restraint and possesses a fondness for both Rome and Nero even in his maddened state, allowing contact with either of them to possibly stop his rampages. He appeared in the third singularity after being summoned by Lev. However, he was then defeated by Nero. Caligula then appeared in Olympus as part of the Godbreaking Alliance. Back when he was summoned, he battled against Artemis and was injured forcing the twins Adele and Macarios to put his body in cryogenic state. But that battle alleviate him of his insanity due to his bond with Diana being broken. Chaldea later retrieved his body and awakened him and plans to summon a Grand Servant using him as a catalyst. In the battle against Zeus, Caligula gave up his life when both Adele and Macarios performed the Godbreaker Spell Protocol to summon Romulus-Quirinus.
Saber (セイバー, Seibā) / Archer (アーチャー, Āchā) – Altera (アルテラ, Arutera)
Voiced by: Mamiko Noto
Appearing in Septem as an antagonist and later, an ally, Altera is a Saber-class servant summoned in the grand order during A.D 0060. An avatar of the White Titan, Altera is well known as the Scourge of God, discovered within the dark ruins of a civilization from thousands of years ago by the Hun elders, with the tattoos of combat on her body and the Photon Ray in her hand. After she killed an armed man, the elders began to regard her as "destruction" itself, and she went on to destroy civilizations as her instincts dictated. Her true nature in revealed in Salomon chapter by Stheno, that she was an alien entity that attempted to destroy the human civilization during the Age of Gods but defeated by the gods. She mysteriously disappeared after the incident and found thousands of years later by the Huns without any memories of the past and used by them to terrorize Asia and the Roman Empire as "Attila the Hun". Being a fierce warrior, she has some magnanimity for those warriors whose skill (performance) she has acknowledged, but those who stand against her are treated as only obstructions to be removed, and she is fundamentally merciless. She was summoned by Leff in Septem as a last ditch effort to destroy Ritsuka's group, only for her to kill him and sets her sights on destroying Nero's empire along with rest of the Western World. She then became an ally in later chapters.
Rider (ライダー, Raidā) – Edward Teach (エドワード・ティーチ, Edowādo Tīchi)
Voiced by: Tadahisa Saizen (Japanese); Jason Marnocha (English)
Appearing in Okeanos as an antagonist and later, an ally, Edward Teach is a Rider-class servant summoned in the grand order during A.D 1573. Known as Blackbeard, he roamed the seas of the singularity upon his ship the Queen Ann's Revenge, terrorizing the sea and causing problems to Francis Drake until his vessel is struck down by the Argonauts. Though, he is more of a goofy but bumbling leader while being an Otaku. But while he can be violent towards his subordinates without warning, he also possesses the bravery to savagely charge at a forest of swords and rain of bullets. Due to his bumbling nature and antics, he has become a popular recurring joke character in the game.
Saber (セイバー, Seibā) – Jason (イアソン, Iason)
Voiced by: Sōichirō Hoshi
Appearing in Okeanos as an antagonist and later, an ally, Jason is a Saber-class servant summoned in the grand order during A.D 1573. Known to be the captain of the Argo and the leader of the Argonauts, his greatest skill is his charisma. A natural-born leader, Jason is even capable of convincing Heracles as a Berserker to follow his commands. Indeed, in spite of lacking any genuine combat abilities, Jason was able to lead the Argonauts through his words alone. He serves as the main antagonist of the chapter and later revealed to be the vessel for the Demon Pillar Forneus who created the singularity, though against his will. He is then appeared in Atlantis as an ally, and the leader of the New Argonauts after Odessyus's army murdered the previous members.
Lancer (ランサー, Ransā) – Hector (ヘクトール, Hekutōru)
Voiced by: Kunihiko Yasui
Appearing in Okeanos as an antagonist and later an ally, Hector is a Lancer-class servant summoned in the grand order during A.D 1573. Hector is the exact opposite of Achilles as a hero, a bearded middle-age man who likes to play the fool. He calls himself an "old man" and always fights on the battlefield with an easygoing attitude. Ruthless, but not cruel, he attends to things with a slacken mood from beginning to end. One might misunderstand him as lacking in seriousness, but he is always serious. It is just that, he avoids to let such emotion called seriousness show on his face to the best of his abilities. He appeared in the chapter as part of Blackbeard's crew. He then later appeared in Atlantis as one of the servants summoned by the Counter Force, who assisted on shielding Ritsuka and the others from the blast done by Artemis but at the cost of his life. His shield was later used by Mandricardo to block another blast.
Caster (キャスター, Kyāsutā) – Charles Babbage (チャールズ・バベッジ, Chāruzu Babejji)
Voiced by: Tetsu Inada (Japanese); Chris Tergliafera (English)
Appearing in London as an antagonist, Babbage is Caster-Class servant summoned in the grand order during A.D 1888. His form as a Servant is his soul being bound to a large steam-powered automaton. He, along with Paracelsus von Hohenheim and Makiri Zolgen created the Holy Grail-powered machine that produced the demonic fog that spread throughout London.
Archer (アーチャー, Āchā) – Nikola Tesla (ニコラ・テスラ, Nikora Tesura)
Voiced by: Tetsu Inada
Appearing in London as an antagonist, Tesla is an Archer-Class servant summoned in the grand order during A.D 1888. He is summoned by the demonic fog and he served as the final piece necessary to spread the fog around the world, although he is defeated by Kintoki and Mordred. He briefly returns in E Pluribus Unum as an ally to aid his rival Edison and the others against Medb's Celtic army.
Lancer (ランサー, Ransā) – Altria Alter (アルトリア・オルタ, Arutoria Oruta)
Voiced by: Ayako Kawasumi (Japanese); Kari Wahlgren (English)
Appearing in London as an antagonist, Altria Alter is a Lancer-Class servant summoned in the grand order during A.D 1888. This Altria that was summoned in this singularity was different from the other two as she was a corrupted servant wielding the Holy Spear Rhongomyniad. But the form she is now is someone who is a representation of the Heroic Spirit of the Holy Lance that did not become the Lion King. Also known as the "King of Storms" (嵐王, Ran'ō), she is viewed as the leader of the Wild Hunt and serves as the singularity's final boss.
Berserker (バーサーカー, Bāsākā) – Cú Chulainn Alter (クー・フーリン・オルタ, Kū Fūrin Oruta)
Voiced by: Nobutoshi Canna (Japanese); Tony Oliver (English)
Appearing in E Pluribus Unum as an antagonist, Cú Chulainn Alter is a Berserker-Class servant summoned in the grand order during A.D 1783. His summoning in the singularity and also his demonic image is due to Medb's desire; an ideal Servant reflecting the wish made upon the Holy Grail by Medb for a wicked monarch similar to herself and Cú Chulainn. He appeared in the fifth singularity as its main antagonist, calling himself the Mad King Cú Chulainn (狂王クー・フーリン, Kyōnō Kū Fūrin) until he's defeated by Ritsuka and his group.
Rider (ライダー, Raidā) / Saber (セイバー, Seibā) – Medb (メイヴ, Meivu)
Voiced by: Ayane Sakura (Japanese); Anairis Quiñones (English)
Appearing in E Pluribus Unum as an antagonist, Medb is a Rider-Class servant summoned in the grand order during A.D 1783. Though at first she looks pure, she in nature is very devious and lewd, devoted to loving good men. Her sexually driven nature was her passion and desire on wanting to create Cú Chulainn Alter through her wish in the holy grail. She serves as one of the main antagonists in the singularity as one of the members of the Celtic Army.
Archer (アーチャー, Āchā) – Arjuna (アルジュナ, Arujuna)
Voiced by: Nobunaga Shimazaki
Appearing in E Pluribus Unum as an antagonist, Arjuna is an Archer-class servant summoned in the grand order during A.D 1783. As a hero of the "Mahabharata", he is a polar opposite and rival to Karna. Extremely diligent, integrous, just and upright, Arjuna has a flawless personality with no faults to point out and hit on. He has an honest and faithful personality that seems to embody justice itself. At the very least, the people around him, including Karna, perceived him that way. He appeared in the fifth singularity as part of the Celtic Army.
Berserker (バーサーカー, Bāsākā) – Beowulf (ベオウルフ, Beourufu)
Voiced by: Kazuya Nakai
Appearing in E Pluribus Unum as an antagonist, later ally, Beowulf is a Berserker-class servant summoned in the grand order during A.D 1783. He is a battle-maniac by nature, who would end up entering a mode of "there is no choice but to talk with our fists!" He lacks most of the merits and demerits from Mad Enhancement, and even mutual understanding by means of conversation is possible. He possesses reason, and it is also possible to have a high grade conversation with him. He appeared in the singularity as part of the Celtic Army, acting as the warden of Alcatraz, which is where Sita kept prisoner. He then appeared in the Anastasia Lostbelt as one of the heroic servants summoned by the counter force.
Archer (アーチャー, Āchā) – Sir Tristan (サー・トリスタン, Sā Torisutan)
Voiced by: Kōki Uchiyama (Japanese); Griffin Puatu (English)
Appearing in Camelot as an antagonist, Tristan is an Archer-Class servant summoned in the grand order during A.D 1273. Being nicknamed "Child of Sadness", Tristan is more of a downer and a narcissist slightly intoxicated with himself. However, since his circumstances are genuinely tragic, it is hard to call him out on it. The type that perceives things tragically and ends up thinking that every mistake is his fault. His thoughts are calm, his tactics precise; yet where it concerns women, his reason is shaken, in a good way. He was summoned through the singularity as one of the Knights of the Lion King along with Lancelot, Gawain, Mordred and Agravain.
Sir Agravain (サー・アグラヴェイン, Sā Aguravein)
Voiced by: Hiroki Yasumoto (Japanese); J. Michael Tatum (English)
One of the Knights of the Lion King, Agravain is one of the original members of the Knights of the Round Table. He is calm, calculated and even cruel, always going for the best option at hand. Agravain often advocated more so than the others of the King's inhuman nature. When he was summoned at Camelot, he sided with the Lion King and defeated and killed his fellow knights. Despite the Lion King giving him a gift, he refused to accept it.
Lancer (ランサー, Ransā) – Goddess Rhongomyniad (女神ロンゴミニアド, Megami Rongominiado)
Voiced by: Ayako Kawasumi (Japanese); Kari Wahlgren (English)
The main antagonist of the Camelot Singularity, the Goddess Rhongomyniad is the ruler of the Singularity in Jerusalem in A.D 1273. Known also as the "Lion King" (獅子王, Shishi-Ō), she is the goddess version of Altria Pendragon after the Holy Spear Rhongomyniad transformed her into a Divine Spirit devoid of personality and emotions. She wandered the Earth until discovering Goetia's plans to eradicate humanity. With it, she summoned the Knights of the Round Table and gives them the choice to either aid her in her "Holy Selection" or side against her. Gawain, Lancelot, Agravain, Tristan, Mordred, and Gareth side with her, forming the Knights of the Lion King. After they kill the other knights, the Goddess Rhongomyniad grants each of them a Gift, with the exception of Agravain, who refuses to have one. Goddess Rhongomyniad and her knights then set out to the Holy Land, killing all that oppose them, including the False Crusaders and their leader, who the knights defeat in a battle, where Gareth also sacrifices herself. Goddess Rhongomyniad then establishes the Holy City.
Her actions were noticed when Chaldea sent Ritsuka and Mash to resolve the singularity in Jerusalem, now Camelot. However, her strength and the power of the knights were overpowering enough that it forces them to retreat. Rhongomyniad's power were just as strong enough to overpower Ritsuka's group until she was defeated with the assistance from Bedivere.
Lancer (ランサー, Ransā) / Avenger (アヴェンジャー, Avenjā) – Kingu (キングゥ, Kingwu)
Voiced by: Yū Kobayashi (Japanese); Marin Miller (English)
Appearing in Babylonia as an Antagonist, Kingu is a Lancer-Class servant summoned in the grand order during B.C 2500. On his first appearance, he took on the name of Enkidu due to being created by Tiamat by placing his soul inside the deceased body of the said figure. He believes to himself to be the start of a new humanity created by his "mother", but he later learns he is not truly one of her children. Learning the truth about this, he decided to sacrifice himself by becoming the chains that binds Tiamat during the final assault on Uruk.
Avenger (アヴェンジャー, Avenjā) – Gorgon (ゴルゴーン, Gorugōn)
Voiced by: Yū Asakawa (Japanese); Melissa Fahn (English)
Appearing in Babylonia as an Antagonist, Gorgon is an Avenger-Class servant summoned in the grand order during B.C 2500. She is one of members of the Three Goddesses Alliance who has been used by the slumbering Tiamat as her vessel. Through her, Tiamat releases demonic beasts to attack the city of Uruk. After Ana had slain Gorgon, Tiamat awakened from her slumber although Ana returned as the Gorgon and aided Chaldea's battle against the Beast.
Beast II (ビーストII, Bīsuto II) – Tiamat (ティアマト, Tiamato) / Alter Ego (アルターエゴ, Arutā Ego) / Archer (アーチャー, Āchā) – Larva/Tiamat (ラーヴァ / ティアマト, Rāva/Tiamato)
Voiced by: Aoi Yūki (Japanese); Melissa Fahn (English)
The main antagonist of Babylonia and the second of the 7 Beasts, Tiamat is known as the Beast of Regression. She was asleep for several millennia due to Merlin's Magecraft and that her awakening in the Singularity was due to the power of the Holy Grail and the collapse of the Human Order Foundation. She remained dormant in slumber but already attacking Uruk by creating demonic beasts and lending her power to Gorgon Medusa. Although there is resentment/hatred/sadness for being abandoned for having already served her purpose, there is also a conduct in indulging in the "joy" of coming back to repaint the earth's ecosystems once again as the mother of everything. After the death of Gorgon, she has awakened and personally attack Uruk and the rest of humanity through a swarm of Lahmus and her Chaos Tide. She is defeated by combined efforts of the Chaldea party, Merlin, Medusa, Quetzalcoatl, Jaguar Man, Ishtar, Ereshkigal and later, King Hassan and Gilgamesh.
Another version of Tiamat was later created by the Beast itself in order to manifest into the Babylon Singularity in Fate/Grand Order Arcade. This version, created to avert the advent of a "fellow calamity from the sea", she manifested for the purpose of protecting the humanity that defeated her from destruction. Tiamat formed her larval Alter Ego with the basis of "what if I reset myself and were reborn." Extroverted and passive. She hates humanity in general. But despite that, the mysterious girl insists that she will protect humanity from everything. Her standoffishness comes from her pride and status telling her that the Mother of Genesis has a duty to point out humanity's faults. Due to her younger body, the Mother of Life's ability to accept everything is lowered, but the essentials of her personality, attitudes, and ideals remain the same. She appeared in the Babylon Singularity, aiding Chaldea to stop Nebuchadnezzar II's efforts to erase human history. With the help from Enkidu, they defeated him, but didn't stop the advent of Beast VI/S from destroying the singularity.
Beast I (ビーストI, Bīsuto I) – Goetia (ゲーティア, Gētia)
Voiced by: Tomokazu Sugita (Japanese); Jalen K. Cassell (English)
The main antagonist of the first chapter and the first of the 7 Beasts, Goetia is the King of Demon Gods; an aggregate form of the 72 demons of the Ars Goetia, born after being unsealed after Solomon's death and after his wish to be human. He first appeared in London chapter disguised as the Grand Caster and reveals he is the cause of the great cataclysmic event before the beginning of the story and the one behind the Demon Pillars that the group faced earlier. He is also the one behind the giant halo that always in the sky in all time periods, which is later revealed as his ultimate Noble Phantasm, Ars Almadel Salomonis. His true goal is to travel back in time when the Earth is being formed and write the history where the concept of death never existed, although it can be only done if he can gather an enormous amount of energy gained by incinerating the humanity in all periods of time, which is called the Grand Orders. He is faced by Chaldea and a number of Summoned Servants and was defeated at the hands of Ritsuka Fujimaru.

=== Epic of Remnant ===
==== Shinjuku ====
Archer (アーチャー, Āchā) / Ruler (ルーラー, Rūrā) – James Moriarty (ジェームズ・モリアーティ, Jēmuzu Moriāti)
Voiced by: Hashi Takaya (Archer), Kento Itō (Ruler) (Japanese); Kirk Thornton (Archer) (English)
The main antagonist of the Shinjuku Singularity, James is an Archer-Class servant summoned during A.D. 1999. Also known as "Archer of Shinjuku" (新宿のアーチャー, Shinjuku no Āchā), he is a composite servant summoned by the demon pillar Baal using his Saint Graph and fusing it the phantom spirit Max The Freeshooter which enables him to always hit his target. When he is first summoned, him and Baal planned to use the asteroid to destroy the world by loading it to the Barrel Tower and firing it to the core of the planet. To ensure their plans, Baal erased his memories and implanted good memories into him while Baal took his form. In his first appearance, he had saved Ritsuka after he rayshifted into Shinjuku and assist in the problems surrounding the city. However when their true plans were revealed alongside Baal and were thwarted using the noble phantasm Critical Word, he had admitted defeat. Moriarty realizes he lost because he was held back by his memories with Ritsuka, knowing he couldn't erase them for the sake of his plan. He thought he could discard Ritsuka once his memories returned, but he couldn't. He then finds himself perplexed, having experience being on the side of justice for once.
Another version of Moriarty was also summoned, but as a Ruler-Class Servant serving the Foreign World that the Foreign God originated from. The people of the Foreign World summoned Moriarty in his youth, from an age before he met Sherlock Holmes, and his saint graph combined with the Norns from Norse Mythology. A slightly better person than the older Moriarty, with something of a fragile self-esteem. He has a promising future filled with hope, but he has already made the most important choice of his life: to relentlessly brave the path of evil. He faces others as a cheerful and likeable young man who loves mathematics and is always making calculations. He appeared in the Traum Singularity in Canada, who seeks to oppose the Foreign God's plans, thus needs to ally with Chaldea. However, due to his dislike for Ritsuka for their role in allowing the Foreign God's advent, he seeks to contract with Kadoc Zemlupus, take over Chaldea, and replace Ritsuka with Kadoc as the Master against the Foreign God. He was summoned due to his compatibility against Sherlock Holmes, who is an unknowing rogue Apostle of the Foreign God who sealed his own memories in order to ally with Chaldea. Moriarty's mission was to restore Sherlock's memories and expose him as an Apostle, then defeat him when he became compelled to follow the Alien God's role for him, ridding Chaldea of their secret traitor for when he takes control. Moriarty did killed Holmes finally during their duel at Reichenbach Falls. As he saw his rival falls off the cliff with a smile, bears his friends at Chaldea farewell, knowing that they will be the ones to win in the end. Moriarty was defeated by Ritsuka and Mash alongside Charlmangle's help, and with it he admitted defeat at their hands. He then lead them to the very site where Subject E, an alien lifeform first found by the humans is located before he disappears completely.
Assassin (アサシン, Asashin) – Yan Qing (燕青, En Sei)
Voiced by: Nobuhiko Okamoto
Appearing in Shinjuku as an antagonist, Yan Qing is an Assassin-Class servant summoned in the remnant grand order during A.D 1999. Also known as "Assassin of Shinjuku" (新宿のアサシン, Shinjuku no Asashin), he is a servant who is fused with a phantom Doppelgänger which enables him to disguise as anyone he wishes. Serving as one of the members of the Four Phantom Alliance, he appeared when he killed the Phantom of the Opera before he cond reveal to Ritsuka their plans. In a following battle, he was fatally shot by Moriarty. After resolving the sub-singularity, he later became an ally in several events.
Avenger (アヴェンジャー, Avenjā) – Hessian Lobo (ヘシアン・ロボ, Heshian Robo)
Voiced by: Ryōta Takeuchi
Appearing in Shinjuku as an antagonist, Hessian Lobo is an Avenger-Class servant summoned in the remnant grand order during A.D 1999. Once known as "Rider of Shinjuku" (新宿のライダー, Shinjuku no Raidā), Hessian Lobo is a composite servant who is summoned with two heroic spirits: the Hessians and Lobo the King of Currumpaw. Their class changes depending on who is the dominant one, Rider if it is Hessian is the dominant and Avenger if it is Lobo. But due to being unstable even after summoning, their spirit origin was fused with several phantoms, with a third Phantom "The Invisible Man" completing it, which gives them the ability of invisibility. When summoned in Chaldea, their class is Avenger which Lobo is the dominant one. Now known as the "Avenger of Shinjuku" (新宿のアヴェンジャー, Shinjuku no Avenjā), they were part of the Four Phantom Alliance and also the most fierce of the group. Due to its sheer strength, it will take a trap to take him down using Caval II as bait. When its Hessian part defeated, Lobo was critically injured as Ritsuka and the others let him go, dying from its wounds.

==== Agartha ====
Caster (キャスター, Kyasutā) – Scheherazade (シェヘラザード, Sheherazādo)
Voiced by: Kikuko Inoue
The main antagonist of the Agartha Singularity, Scheherazade is a Caster-Class servant summoned in the remnant grand order during A.D 2000. Also known as the "Caster of Nightless Castle" (不夜城のキャスター, Fuyajō no Kyasutā), she worked alongside Wu Zetian on ruling the northern part of Agartha and is responsible for Fergus's young age after her magic backfired on making him younger. Scheherazade also worked with the surviving Demon Pillar Phenex, creating the singularity and other fictional places through her Noble Phantasm, and modified certain Servants. They intend to create an incident that will weaken the world's mystery to disable the Servant Summoning System so she won't experience repeated deaths anymore. However, after her plans were found out and defeated by Ritsuka's group, she then realized her mistake and with the resolving of the singularity, finally became a permanent ally.
Assassin (アサシン, Asashin) – Wu Zetian (武則天, Bu Zokuten)
Voiced by: Shiori Izawa
Appearing in Agartha as an antagonist, Wu Zetian is an Assassin-Class servant summoned in the remnant grand order during A.D 2000. Known in her moniker as the "Assassin of Nightless Castle" (不夜城のアサシン, Fuyajō no Asashin), she ruled the northern part of the singularity and ordered to destroy Ys. Later on, she had an encounter with Ritsuka's group when they infiltrated the Nightless Castle and was then attacked by Megalos. However, she survived the attack and remain hidden until she got the chance to ruin Scheherazade's plans.
Rider (ライダー, Raidā) – Christopher Columbus (クリストファー・コロンブス, Kurisutofā Koronbusu)
Voiced by: Hōchū Ōtsuka (Japanese); Brook Chalmers (English)
Appearing in Agartha as an ally and later an antagonist, Christopher Columbus is a Rider-Class servant summoned in the remnant grand order during A.D 2000. Known in her moniker as the "Rider of Resistance" (レジスタンスのライダー, Rejisutansu no Raidā), he first appeared with Amnesia and was leading a Resistance group alongside Megalos. Though Mash and her friends trusted him first, Rituska has a lot of doubts about his personality and also, his motives. Later when his memories returned, his sinister and rather putrid personality has revealed, shown as an exaggeration of the said figure's real life personality. His true goal is also revealed to Chaldea: which is to overtake the authority in the singularity and use the Holy Grail to return the world in a time where slavery still exists and turn the whole world into his slaves. He is later defeated by Ritsuka's group.
Berserker (バーサーカー, Bāsākā) – Penthesilea (ペンテシレイア, Penteshireia)
Voiced by: Yū Shimamura
Appearing in Agartha as an antagonist, Penthesilea is a Berserker-Class servant summoned in the remnant grand order during A.D 2000.Known in her moniker as the "Berserker of El Dorado" (エルドラドのバーサーカー, Erudorado no Bāsākā), she leads a group of Amazons and one of the bitter enemies of the Resistance. She manifested as a Berserker Servant in her younger and "less beautiful" state, and will go berserk whenever a Greek hero appeared in her sight. She has complete hostility towards Megalos due to his Saint Graph matches that of Heracles.

==== Shimosa ====
Lancer (ランサー, Ransā) – Hozoin Inshun (宝蔵院胤舜, Hōzōin Inshun)
Voiced by: Daisuke Namikawa
Appearing in Shimosa as an antagonist, Hozoin Inshun is a Lancer-Class servant summoned in the remnant grand order during A.D 1630. He is summoned by Amakusa in the singularity, with his Saint Graph corrupted by Amakusa in order to assassinate Musashi. The corrupted Hozoin goes under the name Lancer of Purgatorio the events of the chapter.
Archer (アーチャー, Āchā) – Tomoe Gozen (巴御前)
Voiced by: Hisako Kanemoto
Appearing in Shimosa as an antagonist, Tomoe Gozen is an Archer-Class servant summoned in the remnant grand order during A.D 1630. She was summoned by Gilgamesh to defend Uruk, however, she died after successfully destroying an army of demonic beasts by herself before the Chaldea group arrived in the singularity. She returned in Shimosa chapter as one of corrupted Servants as Archer of Inferno.
Assassin (アサシン, Asashin) – Mochizuki Chiyome (望月千代女)
Voiced by: Ayane Sakura
Appearing in Shimosa as an antagonist and later in Atlantis as an ally, Mochizuki Chiyome is an Assassin-Class servant summoned in the remnant grand order during A.D 1630. She appeared in the singularity under the moniker Assassin of Paraíso as a corrupted servant ordered to murder Ritsuka and Musashi. She later appeared in the Greek Lostbelt as part of the New Argonauts led by Jason.
Assassin (アサシン, Asashin) / Caster (キャスター, Kyasutā) – Shuten Douji (酒呑童子, Shuten Dōji)
Voiced by: Aoi Yūki (Japanese); Emi Lo (English)
Appearing in Shimosa as an antagonist, Shuten Douji is an Assassin-Class servant summoned in the remnant grand order during A.D 1630. Unlike her other counterpart Ibaraki, Shuten is more calm and relaxed in demeanor but is also sharp as glass when it comes to authority. She herself took the form of a female Oni, in which form is what she took as Sakata Kintoki's former lover. She appeared in Rashoumon and Onigashima events. She also participated in final battle in Salomon chapter. She is later summoned and corrupted by Amakusa to become Berserker of Saṃghāta Hell during the events of Shimosa. She then later appeared in Lostbelt 5.5 as one of the main antagonists in the singularity, alongside Ibaraki.
Berserker (バーサーカー, Bāsākā) / Lancer (ランサー, Ransā) – Minamoto no Raiko (源頼光, Minamoto no Raikō)
Voiced by: Haruka Tomatsu
Appearing in Shimosa as an antagonist, Minamoto no Raiko is a Berserker-Class servant summoned in the remnant grand order during A.D 1630. While qualifies as a Saber-class Servant, Raiko manifested as a female Berserker-class Servant who carried his extreme "motherly love" towards his subordinates. The female Raiko appeared in the Onigashima event. She also participated in Salomon chapter as one of the Servants fighting the Demon Pillar Andromalius. She is later summoned and corrupted by Amakusa to become Rider of Kālasūtra Hell and forced to work with her archnemesis Shuten Douji during the events of Shimosa. She then appeared in Lostbelt 5.5 as the leader of the Four Heavenly Kings and the master of heroic servant Nursery Rhyme.
Assassin (アサシン, Asashin) – Kato Danzo (加藤段蔵, Katō Danzō)
Voiced by: Satomi Akesaka
Appearing in Shimosa as an ally, later antagonist, Kato Danzo is an Assassin-Class servant summoned in the remnant grand order during A.D 1630. She was summoned as a Karakuri puppet serving the Fuuma clan until their demise and also the foster mother of Fuuma Kotaro. Though she first appeared as an ally to both Ritsuka and co., she was indeed a spy, once found by Ashiya Douman deactivated due to a lack of magical energy and her limbs broken. The Caster of Limbo repaired her to serve in his plan while tinkering with her memories so she barley remembered her past, once reactivated Danzo agreed to obey his commands as her new master. After crossing blades with Musashi, Danzo activated a self destruct within her that took out Musashi's right eye and much of Danzo's right side. Before completely expiring she told Ritsuka's group to stop Ashiya Douman and told Kotaro that she remembers meeting him before. After this Kotaro absorbed the magical energy left behind in her body to empower himself.
Saber (セイバー, Seibā) – Yagyu Tajima-no-Kami Munenori (柳生但馬守宗矩, Yagyū Tajima-no-Kami Munenori)
Voiced by: Kazuhiro Yamaji
Appearing in Shimosa as an ally, later antagonist, Yagyū Munenori is a Saber-Class servant summoned in the remnant grand order during A.D 1630. Never speaking of his passions, he does not become impetuous or impatient. He thoroughly carries out the optimal, shortest measures in order to achieve an objective with the utmost coolness. A man of ice and steel who is reliable as an ally, but extremely terrifying once he becomes an enemy. He appeared during Shimosa chapter as Saber of Empireo.

==== Salem ====
Foreigner (フォーリナー, Fōrinā) – Abigail Williams (アビゲイル・ウィリアムス, Abigeiru Wiriamusu)
Voiced by: Hitomi Ōwada
The main antagonist of the Salem Singularity, Abigail Williams is a Foreigner class servant summoned in the remnant grand order during A.D 1692. At first when Chaldea arrived in the singularity, she appeared normally as young girl who lives there with her friend Lavinia. As a follower of the Puritan sect, Abigail is an innocent girl who respects God and never fails to give her thanks through prayer. Sensitive and naive, she is merely a girl of her age. However, one act she did regret caused the start the witch hunt and the people of Salem were indeed afraid of her. She did live with her father figure Randolph Carter, who is actually the vessel of the Demon Pillar Raum in which he plans to make her into a vessel of the Outer God, Sut-Typhon, in hopes to continue Goetia's plan of "salvation". This plan backfires as the power of the outer god possessed her is too much for her to control. When Lavinia was mortally wounded by Raum, Abigail, in despair of losing her friend, threw away her human heart, human words, and human hopes. She finishes the chant for Sut-Typhon and fully awakens. Abigail had yet to fully become one with the Outer God, and she still had her limits. It took everything Ritsuka had as a master and everyone in Chaldea could to fully defeat her and seal the outer god away. After the incident, she is recorded by Chaldea as the first ever Foreigner-Class servant.

=== Cosmos in the Lostbelt ===
==== The Foreign God and its Disciples ====
Beast IV/L (ビーストIV/L, Bīsuto IV/L) / Alter Ego (アルターエゴ, Arutā Ego) – Koyanskaya (コヤンスカヤ, Koyansukaya) / Assassin (アサシン, Asashin) – Koyanskaya of Light (光のコヤンスカヤ, Hikari no Koyansukaya) / Foreigner (フォーリナー, Fōrinā) – Koyanskaya of Darkness (闇のコヤンスカヤ, Yami no Koyansukaya)
Voiced by: Chiwa Saitō
One of the main antagonists in Cosmos in the Lostbelt, she is an accomplice of the Outer Gods and convinced Goredorf to take over the Chaldean Security Organization and make a secret takeover. Also known as "TV Koyanskaya" (TVコヤンスカヤ, TV Koyanskaya), she is an expert arms dealer and mercenary. At first, she is very professional and tries to act cute, but she is very sadistic and sometimes shows no remorse to the Chaldean crew. He was suspected to be "Tamamo Vitch", who was one of the Tamamo Nine, but his true identity is that of a being born from the many animals sacrificed in the Tunguska event, and he has nothing to do with Tamamo Nine. As due to the original Beast IV's disappearance and the role became vacant, making it easy for Koyanskaya to become the next candidate for Beast IV as she gathers several essences in order for her to fully manifest. In the Tunguska Sanctuary, she finally gets to fully manifest into a true Beast, as the Beast of Treasuring (愛玩の獣, Aigan no Kemono). She was fully defeated by Novum Chaldea with the help from Taigong Wang and Dobrynya Nikitich. In her defeat, Taigong learned more about her backstory and her pain and regret as he used a spell to send her back to the cosmos. Soon after the incident, two servants bearing her name were summoned into the Grand Order that represents Koyanskaya's separate traits. Its Light trait, was summoned during the events of the seventh lostbelt as an ally.
Alter Ego (アルターエゴ, Arutā Ego) – Grigori Rasputin (グリゴリー・ラスプーチン, Gurigorī Rasupūchin) / Kirei Kotomine (言峰綺礼, Kotomine Kirei)
Voiced by: Jouji Nakata
One of the main antagonists of the second chapter and an accomplice to the Foreign God,. Also known as "Priest", he is a very calm and mysterious man who resembled one of the Master Candidates that participated in the Fourth Holy Grail War and was accompanying Goredolf when he finally took over Chaldea. But when their true intentions were revealed and during Ritsuka's escape to the Lostbelt, he killed off Leonardo da Vinci during their escape. He is then later revealed to be an Alter-Ego Servant, more importantly, a Psudo-Servant of Rasputin using the deceased body of Kirei Kotomine. As he shares the same mannerisms and personality as Kirei, he also has incredible superhuman abilities.
Alter Ego (アルターエゴ, Arutā Ego) – Ashiya Douman (蘆屋道満, Ashiya Dōman)
Voiced by: Toshiyuki Morikawa
First appearing as the main antagonist of the Shimousa Singularity, Ashiya Douman is an Alter-Ego class servant summoned in the remnant grand order during A.D 1630. He is one of the three Alter-Ego Servants serving the Foreign God, described as a voracious, carnivorous beast whose voice is akin to a ghost of an evil king who devour gods, rips them apart and make their flesh his own. An ego guided by a greater existence, whose core brims with evil and malice. Before the events of the singularity, he was ordered by the Foreign God to eradicate Ritsuka Fujimaru in due to his existence could be detrimental to its plans on taking over Greater History of Man. As he appeared in Shimousa, he crossed paths with Amakusa, both agreeing to execute a plan to exterminate humanity. Taking the moniker of "Caster of Limbo" (キャスター・リンボ, Kyasutā Rinbō), he used black arts to corrupt several people and turn them into beings that spread destruction across Shimousa. His silhouette is seen for the first time when the Seven Heroic Spirits Swordmasters appear to welcome the last member, him being the one who personally carved the Curse of Annihilation and transforming him into the remaining swordmaster. He is the one who reactivates Kato Danzo, which he dispatches to accompany the Chaldea faction to lure them into a trap.
After being defeated by Chaldea, he was stabbed by Yagyu at the last moment, who states how disgusted he is with Limbo's existence in his sight before apparently dispose him for good. However, it turns out that the Douman that Chaldea defeated isn't the real one but a spiritual puppet created by the real Ashiya Douman, who is still serving the Foreign God at a different location. He later appears in several events during Cosmos in the Lostbelt until his timely defeat after his Shikigami bodies were destroyed by Scandinavia Peperoncino and his very last shikigami clone was destroyed by Caenis. His original body has then woke up in the Heian Lostbelt, seeking revenge against the ones who defeated him. He is then later defeated and killed during the events of Lostbelt 5.5 through the efforts of Ritsuka and Kintoki, ironically with Danzo dealing the killing blow.
Pretender (プリテンダー, Puritendā) – Alessandro di Cagliostro (アレッサンドロ・ディ・カリオストロ, Aressandoro Di Kariosutoro)
Voiced by: Ryōta Takeuchi
Beast VII (ビーストVII, Bīsuto VII) / Maris CHALDEAS (マリス・カルデアス, Marisu Karudeasu)
Voiced by: Madoka Yonezawa
The true main antagonist of part 2, Maris Chaldeas is the personification of the Replica of the Swirl of the Root, a Pseudo-Universe Model born within the Simulated Global Environment Model "CHALDEAS", the mystic code owned and developed by the Animusphere family. Also known as the Foreign Priestess (異星の巫女, Isei no Miko), it is one of the 7 Beasts of Humanity, representing "Analysis". Its goal within the Chaldea Security Organization is to stop Beast I's plan on incinerating humanity through the Human Order Annihilation Incident assisting them on resolving the Remnant Orders. Such threats are resolved; it will enact the Human Order Revision Incident upon the Human Order while using Displacement Magecraft to replace the Earth with the exterior of CHALDEAS, allowing for the Lostbelts to take root. For that, it requires Novum Chaldea to actually destroy all the lostbelts and also resolve several Ordeal Calls to reach its true form in Antarctica.
Throughout the story, Maris Chaldeas personified itself inside Chaldeas, creating two systems under its own control, one of them is Navigator and the other being the "Foreign God" (異星の神, Isei no Kami) which is responsible for summoning Galahad and the Foreign God Disciples, managing the Foreign World and reviving Chaldea's A-Team as its Crypters. Its Nega-Summon ability negates Novum Chaldea's efforts on summoning any servants from Pan-Human History but can be bypassed by Ritsuka by summoning a servant Chaldeas has summoned. Despite its overbearing analysis, it doesn't understand human reasoning, which the reason for its defeat at the hands of both Ritsuka and Mash and also the destruction of Lostbelt 0.

==== Crypters ====
Kirschtaria Wodime (キリシュタリア・ヴォーダイム, Kirishutaria Vōdaimu)
Voiced by: Sōma Saitō
The leader of the Crypters, who commands the Atlantic Lostbelt and also the leader of Chaldea Security Organization's A-Team. As the head of the Wodime family, Kirschtaria was born in a long line of mages with his magic skills became the source of jealousy in the family. This eventually resulted in his father trying to have him assassinated sometime in his teens, that although unsuccessful, did end up permanently damaging his Magic Circuits. However despite this normally crippling injury inflicted on him that would have destroyed most magus's ability to perform Magecraft, Kirstcharia still retained his immense ability and latent talent in the art and was still deemed to be one of the most talented Maguses of his generation.
He enrolled in the Clock Tower's Astronomy Faculty and was said to be the jewel of the Clock Tower. Kirschtaria was noted to be Marisbury Animusphere's top disciple and was said to be a better successor as a Lord than Olga. He followed Marisbury into joining Chaldea Security Organization and became one of the forty eight Chaldea Master Candidates, Kirschtaria was chosen to be A-Team leader. His heroic servants were Caenis, Dioscuri and Titan. During the final battle in Oylmpus, he was greatly injured after a surprise attack from Beryl and also sacrificed his life using the Sirius Light to repulse U-Olga Marie's descent into the lostbelt.
Ophelia Phamrsolone (オフェリア・ファルムソローネ, Oferia Farumusorōne)
Voiced by: Atsumi Tanezaki
One of the members of the Crypters, who commands the Nordic Lostbelt and is also a member of Chaldea's A-Team, who owns a Jewel Ranked Mystic Eye that has reached the Sixth Imaginary Factor. During the course of her early childhood her parents subjected her through several, incredibly painful magical operation in order to increase her overall abilities as a magus that left deep emotional trauma to her coupled with their "normal" magus mindset of obsessively pursuing the "Truth". She did not receive much emotional support or love from them and due to them placing immense pressure on her to fulfill their high expectations, she ends up developing a quiet, reserved and somewhat shy personality due to her lack of self-confidence and a fear to interact and become close to others.
Her Mystic Eye ability also allowed her to withness a conversation between the Foreign God and Kirishtaria while she was asleep during the accident. As one of the Crypters, she is assigned to manage the Nordic Lostbelt with her heroic servant Sigurd. At this time, she came into contact with Surtr, the flame jötunn sealed in the Nordic Lostbelt. However as Surtr loses control, it becomes obsessed with her. Ophelia herself has feelings to Kirschtaria, but is unaware of it until Mash points it out. He is courted by Napoleon, but never accepts his favors. After Novum Chaldea defeats Sigurd, Surtr broke its contract with her as the giant goes to destroy the Lostbelt. Ophelia uses her Sirius Light to break Surtr's contract from her Mystic Eyes that served as the catalyst, but in return caused her demise.
Hinako Akuta (芥ヒナコ, Akuta Hinako) / Assassin (アサシン, Asashin) / Lancer (ランサー, Ransā) – Yu Mei-ren (虞美人, Gu bijin)
Voiced by: Mariya Ise
One of the members of the Crypters who command the China Lostbelt, and a member of Chaldea's A-Team. A strange girl shrouded in mystery, she was recruited to the organization at the behest of the former director. She used to work as a staff member, but was recruited to the A-Team at the behest of the former director. She doesn't talk much with others and is always reading alone. She only wants to stay in the Chinese Lostbelt only because she wants to "live until the end this time", and is not interested in conflict. Despite being one of the 48 master candidates and has summoned the Saber-Class servant Prince of Lanling, she doesn't have good skills in being one.
Her true identity is then revealed in the lostbelt itself, as she is Yu Mei-ren, Xiang Yu's concubine and also an Incarnated Elemental, a vampiric creature labelled by Magi as closely related to True Ancestors due to having similar development processes. She was given Xiang Yu by the Lostbelt King Qin Shi Huang as a reward and was planning to go into hiding, but when Xiang Yu showed his willingness to fight, she decided to follow him, vowing to stay by his side until the end. After Xiang Yu was defeated, she became enraged and attempted to combine with Fantasy Tree Mayall to destroy the entire Lostbelt alongside Novum Chaldea. But she is defeated with the help from Qin. After that, her spirit became part of the Throne of Heroes, registering her as an Heroic Servant.
Scandinavia Peperoncino (スカンジナビア・ペペロンチーノ, Sukanjinabia Peperonchīno)
Voiced by: Kengo Kawanishi
One of the members of the Crypters who command the Indian Lostbelt, and a member of Chaldea's A-Team. Originally as Arou Myourenji, he was a magus who practiced Shugendō; more specifically, tengu arts. Arou was directly descended from the founder, and was born and raised on the mountain, but all the other Myourenji children were kidnapped from the lands below. Due to their actions, Arou killed all of them before he sever any connection to his family and left Japan. Changing his name to Scandinavia Peperoncino, nicknamed Pepe by his friends, he become a freelancer. It was then he was recruited to Chaldea after Marisbury Animusphere met Scandinavia during his travels, Marisbury wanting to recruit a magus specialized in fighting. Scandinavia joined Chaldea Security Organization by Marisbury's recommendation and became one of the forty-eight Chaldea Master Candidates and a member of A-Team. Scandinavia managed to hide his real name, race, and age from others, but it was assumed he was the oldest among Chaldea's A-Team. He is a mood-maker that calmly eases up the tense Crypters during their meetings. Possessing a feminine-like character, the person himself also enjoys exhibiting it. His motto is to do things smoothly, with fun and friendliness. He uses feminine pronouns to refer to himself. Da Vinci also describes him to be friendly and casual, and he would always lighten the mood of A-Team with his jokes. Mash Kyrielight mention him to be a good listener, especially when the silent Hinako Akuta would close her book when Scandinavia was around. His summoned servant is the Archer-class Ashwatthama.
Though he was in control of the Indian Lostbelt, the actions of its Lostbelt King, Arjuna Alter left him being pursued by one of the heroic servants serving the Lostbelt King. He met up with the rest of Novum Chaldea and offered a truce to them to stop Arjuna Alter and have his servant Ashwatthama come back to his side. With a lot of work and effort from Novum Chaldea's side with his help, finally managed to defeat Arjuna Alter, but due to his status as a Crypter, he regrettedly reaffirm his status as their enemy. He soon lost after Ritsuka and Mash managed to defeat Ashwatthama and the Tree of Emptiness in that Lostbelt. He was considering to use his Sirius Light, but Ashwatthama tells him not to. Seeing Ashwatthama start to disappear, Peperoncino regrets their teamwork wasn't good enough. He wonders if things would've been better if they kept their contract the whole time. Ashwatthama believes they were a good match and apologizes for not winning their last battle. Peperoncino doesn't mind though since he's alive. He and Ashwatthama then say their goodbyes before the latter disappears. After the battle, Peperoncino retreated back to the Atlantic Lostbelt with the help from Koyanskaya. Peperoncino also proved pivotal for the destruction of all of Ashiya Douman's shikigami bodies due to his actions back in the Indian Lostbelt. With his magical energy exhausted, he leaves Chaldea with the knowledge that Ritsuka and Kirschtaria are alike in both combat ability and personality. He also appeared in the British Lostbelt under the name Count Peperon, who is seeking Beryl Gut, saying that as a member of Team A he has a responsibility to clean up his mess. However, despite the revelation in Olympus that Kirschtaria was never loyal to the Alien God and had planned to overthrow her, Pepe says he will still be Chaldea's enemy once this is sorted out. He is mortally wounded by Beryl, but uses the last of his strength to place a curse upon Beryl which will kill him. As he dies, he reassures Ritsuka that he valued their time together and asks that they continue to look after Mash for him.
Beryl Gut (ベリル・ガット, Beriru Gatto)
Voiced by: Haruki Ishiya
The sociopathic Crypter who was assigned to the British Lostbelt, and a member of Chaldea's A-Team. Raised by a Witch away from human civilization, Beryl ended up in the Clock Tower's Department of Botany, but was infamous for being a criminal and a murderer who learned his skills of assassination from his own mother. Although it was unknown why he was selected by Chaldea, it was known that he was hired as a combatant. He fell in love with Mash Kyrielight, but upon visiting her he broke her fingers as a twisted expression of his feelings, causing Romani Archaman to ban him from her room. Marisbury assigned him to kill possible deserters within Team A. Upon his revival as a Crypter and being assigned to the British Lostbelt, he successfully summons the Ruler-Class Servant Morgan le Fay. Morgan proceeds to undermine his mission by taking control of the British Lostbelt herself, sending all her knowledge into the past, towards the version of herself within the Lostbelt. Although Ruler disappears as a result of changing history, her Lostbelt equivalent appears to reign over the Faeries, destroys the Fantasy Tree, and takes Beryl himself as her husband and Master to attack the other Crypters. During the events of the Olympian Lostbelt, Beryl betrays Wodime, stabbing him in the back as he found Wodime's plan to turn humans into gods incompatible with his murderous desires. He sabotaged Wodime's Fantasy Tree with the remains of his own, and used himself as a targeting beacon so that Morgan could destroy Wodime's Fantasy Tree.
Daybit Bluebook (デイビット・ブルーブック, Deibitto Burūbukku) / Daybit Sem Void (デイビット・ゼム・ヴォイド, Deibitto Zemu Voido)
Voiced by: Kaito Ishikawa
The last member of Crypters and in general Chaldea's A-Team, who commands the South American Lostbelt. He is a man with a mysterious individual among the Crypters, described to be an extraordinary genius on par with Kirschtaria. He once enrolled in the Clock Tower's Department of Lore, and while it was publicly rumored that he was expelled from the Department and that the Mage's Association thought he was on the Department for 8 years but no records of him were found due to a freak accident involving him and his father researching an Angelic Artifact. Its exposure made both of him and his father vanish into thin air, with the tampered relic killing him and creating a new copy of him with all of his memories intact, for which he can remember for five minutes. He then join the Chaldea Security Organization, becoming one of the forty-eight Chaldea Master Candidates and a member of Team A. Rather than being invited by Marisbury Animusphere, he arrived of his own initiative upon hearing of Marisbury's research and interest in his background. He is also the same individual who attempted to kill Marisbury to shut down CHALDEAS and prevent the Lostbelt incident from happening, only for him to kill himself. During the start of the Human Order Revision Incident, he was revived by the Foreign God itself alongside the other Crypters. While visiting Peperoncino in the Indian Lostbelt, it is revealed that he managed to summon a Grand Servant, although they could not be identified at the time until the seventh lostbelt where its revealed it is the Assassin class servant Tezcatlipoca.

==== Anastasia ====
Caster (キャスター, Kyasutā) – Anastasia Nikolaevna Romanova (アナスタシア・ニコラエヴナ・ロマノヴァ, Anasutashia Nikoraevuna Romanova)
Voiced by: Yumi Hara
Appearing in Anastasia as an antagonist, Anastasia is a Caster-Class servant summoned in the Lostbelt Grand Order during 1570 A.D. She is shown to have a bitter, cold disposition, often calling people who oppose her as Rats, "Powerless living things that could do nothing but gnaw and multiply". Her belief of the world is that it is "cruelly, terribly cold", and that those who consider the mild surroundings as 'cold', should be shown a true hell. Though she has shown to have some sense of small sympathy, as she warned Goldorf Musik that he was being backstabbed and used by the enemies. However, she only follows orders as is. As Kadoc's Heroic Servant, she is shown to be slightly nicer underneath. She only acts distant due to her past and does not want her loved ones get hurt again, but once someone gets to know her, she is friendly, mischievous, and loves to play pranks. She can also manipulate the cold, as she is summoned alongside Viy, an elemental who can control ice. She appeared in the Russian lostbelt as the heroic servant of Kadoc Zemlupus, who serves as one of the major threat to the Yaga. She is then killed by Billy the Kid after taking a bullet meant for Kadoc.
Rider (ライダー, Raidā) – Ivan the Terrible (イヴァン雷帝, Ivan Raitei)
Voiced by: Takaya Kuroda
Appearing in Anastasia as an antagonist, Ivan is a Rider-Class servant summoned in the Lostbelt Grand Order during 1570 A.D. He serves as the ruler of the Russian Lostbelt as its King, currently sleeping due to Mozart playing his music under the command of Kadoc Zemlupus. Anastasia, who Ivan believes to be his wife, utilizes Ivan's Oprichniki soldiers produced by his Noble Phantasm to attack and subdue Chaldea Security Organization, while Ivan is kept misinformed by Rasputin, who masquerades as Macarius, an adviser of Ivan during his life. After being awakened due to the death of Mozart, he decided to attack both sides realizing the betrayal of Anastasia and Rasputin. Ritsuka, with the help from Avicebron's Noble Phantasm and by Anastasia herself, helped defeat him. However, he manages to get back up, walking to the Fantasy Tree "Orochi". He confronts Ritsuka about his goal of destroying the Lostbelt, asking him of his resolve to kill all the Yaga in this world. Ivan then makes his last stand, being finally defeated.

==== Götterdämmerung ====
Saber (セイバー, Seibā) – Sigurd (シグルド, Shigurudo)
Voiced by: Kenjiro Tsuda
Appearing in Götterdämmerung as an antagonist, Sigurd is a Saber-Class servant summoned in the Lostbelt Grand Order during BC 1000. Described to be gallant and being strict with himself more than anyone, and was more proud-hearted despite expressing no emotion. His relationship with the Lancer-Class servant Brynhildr is both of love and hatred. As he is the servant summoned by Ophelia, due to the karmic bond between Ophelia and Surtr, Sigurd's body is initially inhabited by Surtr which granted him far from normal strength. During the game's events, he regain his control of his body when Brynhildr attacks him and weakens his core. The two are able to reconcile before heading off with the others to face Surtr before his mana is restored. After Napoleon sacrifices himself to weaken Surtr with his Noble Phantasm, Sigurd and Brynhildr follow suit, landing the final blow. Though they're fading away, Sigurd shares a smile with Brynhildr; he tells her that she shouldn't hesitate to come and kill him if that is the proof of her love, so he can survive and prove his love to her all the more.
Saber (セイバー, Seibā) – Surtr (スルト, Suruto)
Voiced by: Kenjiro Tsuda
Appearing in Götterdämmerung as an antagonist, Surtr is a Saber-Class servant summoned in the Lostbelt grand order during BC 1000. A Fire Jötunn and King of Muspelheim, Ophelia stumbled upon him through her Mystic Eye when she was on the verge of death during the bombing of Chaldea. She sympathized with his sense of failure, and after she vanished, Surtr found himself wondering if there was anything he could do for the first person to truly see him. In that moment, Surtr's soul linked with Ophelia's Mystic Eye. When she summoned Sigurd, his soul is transferred into his body and wishes to make her his bride, hoping she could destroy Sigurd to free his soul and regain his body. But after Brynhildr attacks him and weakens his core, he was freed from his prison and decided to kidnap Ophelia, but only to be taken down by the Chaldea and the lostbelt servants.
Lancer (ランサー, Ransā) / Assassin (アサシン, Asashin) – Valkyrie (ワルキューレ, Warukyūre)
Voiced by: Minami Tanaka (Ortlinde), Mikako Komatsu (Hildr), Sora Amamiya (Thrúd) (Japanese); Gina Bowes (Ortlinde) (English)
Appearing in Götterdämmerung as an antagonist, the Valkyrie were a trio of Lancer-Class servants summoned in the Lostbelt Grand Order during BC 1000. While referring to themselves collectively as "Valkyrie", the three who appear through the Ascension function are Thrúd, Hildr and Ortlinde. All three were daughters of the Great Great God Odin. Scáthach-Skaði commands all three to guard and maintain Surtr's seal. Personality wise, each Valkyrie had their own personality, while they excel in insight, they hold onto their precious valor closely and know what they're fighting for. Their appearance is very chivalrous but sometimes, they can also put a gentle smile towards outstanding heroes. On the other hand, they lack self-awareness of their ego. They all appear in the second lostbelt as guards served under Scáthach-Skadi.

==== S I N ====
Saber (セイバー, Seibā) – Prince of Lanling (蘭陵王, Ranryō-ō)
Voiced by: Nanako Mori
Appearing in S I N as an antagonist, Prince of Lanling is a Saber-Class servant summoned in the Lostbelt Grand Order during BC 210. As being summoned by Hinako, he is an honorable warrior but is also relatively silent yet loyally follows orders. Knowing of his Master's true nature, he does not hesitate to offer up his own blood for her survival. When being summoned by Ritsuka, he is loyal and highly friendly towards other Servants. He feels the need to keep himself masked, and asks for forgiveness, believing he is mistaken of being arrogant. He appeared in the third lostbelt as the heroic servant of Hinako Akuta. After Novum Chaldea discovered his master's true identity, he let her drink his blood for her true form to appear while dying from the process.
Lancer (ランサー, Ransā) – Qin Liangyu (秦良玉, Shin Ryōgoku)
Voiced by: Noriko Shitaya
Appearing in S I N as an antagonist, Qin Liangyu is a Lancer-Class servant summoned in the Lostbelt Grand Order during BC 210. This Qin is the one who existed in the lostbelt due to the influence of its lostbelt king and didn't die in her lifetime, but her body is preserved in cryosleep until the lostbelt king needs their power to preserve the peace in its empire. She has a gentle disposition, while remaining humble, possesses outstanding resourcefulness and she can cope with difficulty in a flexible manner. Alongside Han Xin, Liangyu is one of the heroes chosen by Li Shuwen to be released from cryosleep at Mt. Li. She later died from her wounds after Novum Chaldea invaded the capital where the lostbelt king is located.
Berserker (バーサーカー, Bāsākā) – Xiang Yu (項羽, Kōu U)
Voiced by: Koichi Yamadera
Appearing in S I N as an antagonist, Xiang Yu is a Berserker-Class servant summoned in the Lostbelt Grand Order during BC 210. In the Lostbelt, where Qin Shi Huang's death did not occur, Xiang Yu is being used by the righteous Qin Shi Huang to assist the Qin dynasty's world hegemony under the code name Kuaiji Model Zero. As the standard-bearer and founder of the Sin Army's mechanized army corps, he's finally obtained the realization of his dearest wish, known as the Eternal Sin Empire. Though considered down to others as a hegemon who was a rare genius and a fool at the same time. After all, his true character wasn't something that others could comprehend. Due to the unique sense of time gained from precognition, Xiang Yu's thought process is quite different from that of a regular person. Usually, he remains calm like a large tree, but the moment he perceives an omen of disorder with his future vision, like a storm, Xiang Yu will wildly eliminate his target. Since this would be impossible to understand for a regular person who cannot perceive the future, as a Servant, Xiang Yu is classified as a Berserker.
He appeared in the Chinese Lostbelt as one of Qin Shi Huang most loyal generals, where he is first deployed to assist the Crypter Hinako Akuta. When he found out Hinako was actually the proper human history version of Yu Mei-ren, both became the biggest threat to Novum Chaldea that hinders them on resolving the lostbelt. It took a while until the battle inside The Fusang Tree where Xiang Yu is defeated. Also after the defeat of Qin Shi Huang from Novum Chaldea's hands, despite his orders to stand down, Xiang Yu refuses to accept the emperor's decision, Now loyal only to Yu Mei-ren, he declares he will not let the world his beloved chose as her new home be taken from her. Despite his wounds, he prepares to fight Ritsuka's party to protect Mayall. He declares he will fulfill the wishes of his Proper History counterpart and he fights now for the woman he loves. As he dies after losing to Ritsuka' party, Xiang Yu asks for Yu Mei-ren's forgiveness for once again condemning her to an eternity of wandering alone. He only wanted to grant her solace, and wishes they could have spent endless days together in peace. He then dies with the regret he cannot stay by her side.
Ruler (ルーラー, Rūrā) – Qin Shi Huang (始皇帝, Shi Kōtei)
Voiced by: Jun Fukuyama
Appearing in S I N as an antagonist, Qin Shi Huang is a Ruler-Class servant summoned in the Lostbelt Grand Order during BC 210. Qin Shi Huang is the current Lostbelt King who governs over the Chinese Lostbelt, and its current body was made from the remains of an artificial human body made by the Xian, Taiyi Zhenren from the historic ruins of the Yin dynasty and by analyzing it, he acquired the technology to mechanize the flesh. Thus, the Qin Shi Huang who obtained his dearest wish, immortality, avoided an era of wars with his iron wall-like rule and thanks to this, even before the Western Renaissance and is a transcendental existence who lived for 2200 years with a mechanical body and promptly achieved the feat of unifying the world. It was a wise ruler who considered the matters of the populace carefully, but didn't view them as people. Brimming with a spirit of inquiry, they are interested in everything and would poke their head into things, but due to the inquisitiveness they possessed from the start based on the conclusion that "as expected, the Qin empire is number one", they are always assuming a condescending attitude. The body it possessed is also has a powerful Saint Graph, but is less strong than it is great and that in Proper Human History it would be ranked as a Grand. Qin appears in Chinese Lostbelt as its Lostbelt King, who had used its authority and powers to unify the lostbelt and used its Tree of Emptiness for its advances. It is soon defeated by Novum Chaldea, impressed by Ritsuka's convictions, Shi Huang decides to entrust the future to Chaldea while helping them take down the Tree of Emptiness in that lostbelt.

==== Yuga Kshetra ====
Archer (アーチャー, Āchā) – Ashwatthama (アシュヴァッターマン, Ashuvattāman)
Voiced by: Tatsuhisa Suzuki
Appearing in Yuga Kshetra as an antagonist, Ashwatthama is an Archer-Class servant summoned in the Lostbelt Grand Order during 11900 DV. Stern. He's continuously angry, to the point that most of his words give the illusion of him yelling. He's a straightforward person that laments and resents the unreasonableness of this world more intensely than others, but he's ideal as a warrior. He first appeared in the fourth lostbelt as the servant summoned by Scandinavia Peperoncino after he became a Crypter. But Arjuna Alter stole that contract when Ashiya Douman convinced him to speed up the yuga cycles while inflicting him with the Curse of Krishna. Ashwatthama tried to kill God Arjuna, only for God Arjuna to kill and revive him countless times. Eventually, Ashwatthama's spirit broke, and he agreed to become God Arjuna's first Lokapala to escape his eternal suffering. After Novum Chaldea fought him again, Rama then transfers his curse to himself since he and Krishna are both avatars of Vishnu. After reuniting with his human master, they temporarily teamed up with Novum Chaldea to stop Arjuna Alter and later lost to Novum Chaldea in a last fight to protect the Trees of Emptiness.
Archer (アーチャー, Āchā) – William Tell (ウィリアム・テル, Wiriamu Teru)
Voiced by: Shun Fujii
Appearing in Yuga Kshetra as an antagonist, William Tell is an Archer-Class servant summoned in the Lostbelt Grand Order during 11900 DV. He is the last Servant to be summoned by Arjuna Alter to serve as one of his Lokapala. He was informed of what is duty as a Lokapala, but he refused on the basis that he doesn't kill children. Considering those feelings defective, God Arjuna erases William's memories of his son. He and Asclepius assigned to kill Novum Chaldea under Arjuna Alter's orders, but he struggles mentally due to the memories of his son coming back to him. He died when he tried to kill Arjuna Alter using his Noble Phantasm but was ultimately erased through Arajuna Alter's Mahāpralaya.
Caster (キャスター, Kyasutā) – Asclepius (アスクレピオス, Asukurepiosu)
Voiced by: Ryota Suzuki (Japanese); Lucien Dodge (English)
Appearing in Yuga Kshetra as an antagonist, Asclepius is a Caster-Class servant summoned in the Lostbelt Grand Order during 11900 DV. He is summoned in the Indian Lostbelt as one of Arjuna Alter's Lokapala, who is in charged with South-East to South-West area of the lostbelt. He uses a town in his territory for his medical experiments. After one of the blessings from Arjuna Alter, he gained the ability to raise the dead, but at the cost of his body due to having two divine spirits in his spirit origin and died in a battle against Novum Chaldea. Unbeknownst to everyone else, though, he allowed himself to be killed to restore himself to his original state and free himself from Arjuna Alter's control. He also made use of delayed Emulated Medicine so he can resurrect later. Later he tries to kill Ashiya Douman at the base of the Tree of Emptiness, having deduced that Douman manipulated Arjuna Alter to lead the world to its destruction.
Berserker (バーサーカー, Bāsākā) – Arjuna Alter (アルジュナ オルタ, Arujuna Oruta)
Voiced by: Nobunaga Shimazaki

==== Ōoku ====
Beast III/L (ビーストIII/L, Bīsuto III/L) / Assassin (アサシン, Asashin) / Avenger (アヴェンジャー, Avenjā) – Kama/Mara (カーマ / マーラ, Kāma/Māra)
Voiced by: Noriko Shitaya

==== Atlantis ====
Lancer (ランサー, Ransā) – Caenis (カイニス, Kainisu)
Voiced by: Mikako Komatsu
Appearing in Atlantis as an antagonist and then as an ally, Caenis is a Lancer-Class servant summoned in the Lostbelt Grand Order during BC 12000. She is one of the three summoned Heroic servants under the command of Kirschtaria Wodime alongside Dioscuri and Titan. he has a brash demeanor, a short temper and a sharp tongue; however, she also has a more brutal background and expresses it with various types of physical threats. She is also brutally honest at times, such as saying that because Musashi is a similar person to her, she must also be for the same reason a bad person. She appeared first in the First Lostbelt before her formal appearance in Atlantis and Olympus until she died on a one on one battle between her and both Ritsuka and Mash.
Saber (セイバー, Seibā) – Dioscuri (ディオスクロイ, Diosukuroi)
Voiced by: Yuma Uchida (Castor), Maaya Uchida (Pollux)
Appearing in Atlantis as an antagonist, Dioscuri were a pair of Saber-Class servants summoned in the Lostbelt Grand Order during BC 12000. The two were composed of Castor and Pollux, both being summoned simultaneously by Wodime himself. Castor displays a highly misanthropic, anger-prone demeanor, full of fury towards humanity for stripping away his divinity, as is common in Avengers. While Pollux is much more reasonable than her brother, often reigning in his temper. They both first appeared in the Atlantis Lostbelt, both which accompany Kirschtaria Wodime on taking down Novum Chaldea after their arrival at the lostbelt. They later appeared in Olympus in which they were defeated by both the Godbreaker Force and Novum Chaldea's efforts.
Rider (ライダー, Raidā) – Odysseus (オデュッセウス, Odyusseusu)
Voiced by: Takuya Kirimoto
Caster (キャスター, Kyasutā) – Demeter (デメテル, Demeteru)
Voiced by: Aya Hisakawa
Assassin (アサシン, Asashin) – Aphrodite (アフロディーテ, Afurodīte)
Voiced by: Noriko Hidaka
Ruler (ルーラー, Rūrā) – Zeus (ゼウス, Zeusu)
Voiced by: Hiroyuki Kinoshita

==== Avalon le fae ====
Berserker (バーサーカー, Bāsākā) – Morgan (モルガン, Morugan) / Caster (キャスター, Kyasutā) – Aesc (トネリコ, Tonerico; "Tonelico")
Voiced by: Yui Ishikawa (Japanese); Katelyn Gault (English)
Archer (アーチャー, Āchā) / Pretender (プリテンダー, Puritendā) – Tam Lin Tristan / Baobhan sith (妖精騎士トリスタン / バーヴァン・シー, Yousei Kishi Torisutan / Bāban Shī)
Voiced by: Azumi Waki
Saber (セイバー, Seibā) / Archer (アーチャー, Āchā) – Tam Lin Gawain / Barghest (妖精騎士ガウェイン / バーゲスト, Yousei Kishi Gawein / Bāguesto)
Voiced by: Marina Inoue
Lancer (ランサー, Ransā) / Ruler (ルーラー, Rūrā) – Tam Lin Lancelot / Melusine (妖精騎士ランスロット / メリュジーヌ, Yousei Kishi Ransurotto / Meryujīnu)
Voiced by: Marika Kouno
Berserker (バーサーカー, Bāsākā) – Cernunnos (ケルヌンノス, Kerununnosu)

==== Traum ====
Rider (ライダー, Raidā) – Constantine XI (コンスタンティノス11世, Konstantinosu Jūichisei)
Voiced by: Shinichirō Kamio
Berserker (バーサーカー, Bāsākā) – Kriemhild (クリームヒルト, Kurīmuhiruto)
Voiced by: Aoi Koga
Caster (キャスター, Kyasutā) – Zhang Jue (張角, Chō Kaku)
Voiced by: Shigeru Chiba
Archer (アーチャー, Āchā) – Minamoto no Tametomo (源為朝)
Voiced by: Kenji Nomura
Archer (アーチャー, Āchā) – Sugitani Zenjūbō (杉谷 善住坊)
Voiced by: Yūko Gotō

==== Nahui Michlan ====
Assassin (アサシン, Asashin) – Tezcatlipoca (テスカトリポカ, Tesukatoripoka)
Voiced by: Satoshi Mikami
Saber (セイバー, Seibā) – Shita-kiri Suzume no Benienma (舌切雀の紅閻魔, ShitakiriSuzume no Benienma) – Akezuicyo BeniEnma (朱瑞鳥・紅閻魔, Akezuicyou Benienma)
Voiced by: Misaki Kuno
Pretender (プリテンダー, Puritendā) / Moon Cancer (ムーン・キャンサー, Mūn Kyansā) – Tenochtitlan (テノチティトラン, Tenochititoran)
Voiced by: Mariko Honda
Beast I/L (ビーストI/L, Bīsuto I/L) – Camazotz (カマソッソ, Kamasosso)
Voiced by: Nobuyuki Hiyama
ORT (オルト, Oruto) / Foreigner (フォーリナー, Fōrinā) – ORT Xibalba (オルト・シバルバー, Oruto Shibarubā)

=== Ordeal Call ===
==== Paper Moon ====
Archer (アーチャー, Āchā) – Durga (ドゥルガー, Durugā) / Alter Ego (アルターエゴ, Arutā Ego) – Kali (カーリー, Kārī)
Voiced by: Noriko Shitaya

==== Archetype Inception ====
Moon Cancer (ムーン・キャンサー, Mūn Kyansā) – BB Dubai (BBドバイ, Byibyi Dobai) / Golden BB (ゴールデンBB, Gōruden Byibyi)
Voiced by: Noriko Shitaya
Null Beast (無の獣, Mu no Kemono) / Beast (ビースト, Bīsuto) – Anki Ereshkigal (アンキ・エレシュキガル, Anki Ereshukigaru) / Space Ereshkigal (スペース・エレシュキガル, Supēsu Ereshukigaru)
Voiced by: Kana Ueda
Moon Cancer (ムーン・キャンサー, Mūn Kyansā)

==== Trinity Metatronius ====
Ruler (ルーラー, Rūrā) – Metatron Jeanne (メタトロン・ジャンヌ, Metatoron Jan'nu)
Voiced by: Maaya Sakamoto
Berserker (バーサーカー, Bāsākā) – Lilith (リリス, Ririsu)
Voiced by: Sumire Moroboshi

=== After Time ===
==== Past Chaldea ====
Archer (アーチャー, Āchā) / Beast (ビース, Bīsuto) – Urðr (ウルズ, Uruzu)
Voiced by: Hina Yōmiya

=== Miscellaneous ===
Gudako (ぐだ子)
Voiced by: Tomoko Kaneda
The main protagonist of the Learning With Manga! series and the main antagonist of the All the Statesmen Event, Gudako is a female master coming from an Alternate version of Chaldea, a "chibified" version of the female design for Ritsuka Fujimaru. Unlike Ritsuka, who is more of a heroic protagonist, she exhibits a noticeably erratic and eccentric personality characterized by an all-consuming addiction to gambling on gacha. Belligerent, impulsive, and volatile, she often berates, harasses, and abuses the people around her in various ways, particularly her Servants. She first appeared in the game under the moniker of "Master without a Name", revealing to have abandoned Paul Bunyan due to her uselessness and was only obsessed on getting SSR servants, mainly Saberfaces. Due to her shallow foolishness, she was defeated by Chaldea with the help from the nameless master's former servants.
Foreigner (フォーリナー, Fōrinā) / Saber (セイバー, Seibā) – Katsushika Hokusai (葛飾 北斎)
Voiced by: Yukana
Foreigner (フォーリナー, Fōrinā) – Yang Guifei (楊貴妃, Yō Kihi)
Voiced by: Haruka Yoshimura
