= List of Dance in the Vampire Bund volumes =

Dance in the Vampire Bund is a Japanese manga series written and illustrated by Nozomu Tamaki. The series and its spinoffs were serialized in Monthly Comic Flapper before being collected into tankōbon volumes and published by Media Factory. Seven Seas Entertainment published the volumes in the United States.

== Dance in the Vampire Bund ==
The original Dance in the Vampire Bund manga was serialized in Monthly Comic Flapper from December 5, 2005, to September 5, 2012. Seven Seas Entertainment licensed the series in 2007. The series was collected into 14 volumes.

No.	Original release date	Original ISBN	English release date	English ISBN
01	June 23, 2006	978-4-8401-1397-7	May 27, 2008	978-1-933164-80-9
1. "The Covenant" (誓約, Seiyaku); 2. "Choice" (選択, Sentaku); 3. "Ruler of the Vampires" (クイーンオブザヴァンパイア, Kuīn obu za Vanpaia); 4. "Interview with a Vampire" (インタビューウィズヴァンパイア, Intabyū Wizu Vanpaia); 5. "Night of the Carnival" (カーニバルの夜に, Kānibaru no Yoru Ni); 6. "Good Night, Sleep Tight" (Good night, Sleep tight)
02	December 22, 2006	978-4-8401-1646-6	August 19, 2008	978-1-933164-81-6
7. "To a New Battlefield" (新たな戦場へ, Aratana Senjō e); 8. "Lost in High School"; 9. "Sinister Bolero" (陰謀ボレロ, Inbō Borero); 10. "I Can't See You" (君がみえない, Kimi ga Mienai); 11. "Corrupt Academy" (悪徳学園, Akutoku Gakuen); 12. "Shape of My Heart"
03	June 23, 2007	978-4-8401-1917-7	November 25, 2008	978-1-934876-15-2
13. "A Solemn Promise" (おごそかな誓い, Ogosokana Chikai); 14. "Moving Shadows" (影が行く, Kage ga Iku); 15. "Children of the Night" (夜の子供達, Yoru no Kodomodachi); 16. "Werewolf ~Beowulf~" (人狼～Beowulf～, Jinrō ~Beōrufu~); 17. "Strategic Chess Game" (謀略のチェスゲーム, Bōryaku no Chesu Gēmu); 18. "Sacrifice" (サクリファイス, Sakurifaisu); 19. "Body & Mind" (身も心も, Mimokokoromo)
04	November 22, 2007	978-4-8401-1971-9	July 7, 2009	978-1-934876-53-4
20. "Out of Silence"; 21. "The Kings of Darkness"; 22. "Target, Kaburagi Akira"; 23. "The Fresh-Blooded Maiden"; 24. "Cross Now the River of Rage"; Bonus: "30 Second Sprinter"
05	June 23, 2008	978-4-8401-2233-7	October 27, 2009	978-1-934876-65-7
25. "Two in the Darkness" (暗黒街の二人, Ankoku-gai no Futari); 26. "Intermedio" (intermedio); 27. "Sneak into the Underground" (Sneak the underground); 28. "The Honeybee's Whisper" (ミツバチのささやき, Mitsubachi no Sasayaki); 29. "A Single Frozen Way" (たった一つの冴えたやり方, Tatta Hitotsu no Saeta Yarikata); 30. "The Cradle Will Rock" (Cradle Will Rock); 31. "A Man of Determination" (男児當自強, Danji Kyō)
06	December 22, 2008	978-4-8401-2508-6	February 2, 2010	978-1-934876-74-9
32. "A Message to Sledgehammer" (スレッジ・ハマーへ伝言, Surejjihamā e Dengon); 33. "Standard Daytime" (Standard Daytime); 34. "The Queen's Wolfman"; 35. "Marital Vows"; 36. "Passion Play"; 37. "What a Wonderful Life!"
07	July 23, 2009	978-4-8401-2584-0	April 27, 2010	978-1-934876-80-0
38. "Demon Seed" (DEMON SEED); 39. "Crest of the Wolf" (狼の紋章, Ōkami no Monshō); 40. "Hour of the Wolf" (狼の刻, Ōkami no Koku); 41. "An Afternoon with Wolves" (狼達の午後, Ōkami-tachi no Gogo); 42. "Elegy for a Wolf" (狼の挽歌, Ōkami no Banka); 43. "Wolf, Never Cry" (WOLF, NEVER CRY)
08	December 22, 2009	978-4-8401-2951-0	September 28, 2010	978-1-934876-81-7
44. "Visitors"; 45. "Nothing Hurts"; 46. "The Family Plot"; 47. "Gills"; 48. "Howl of Lament"; 49. "The Dog Named "Traitor""
09	March 23, 2010	978-4-8401-2991-6	December 7, 2010	978-1-934876-87-9
50. "Aftershocks" (余震, Yoshin); 51. "The First to Come" (最初に来たる者, Saisho ni Kitaru mono); 52. "Vampire Wars" (ヴァンパイア戦争(ウォーズ), Vanpaia Wōzu); 53. "The Last to Come" (最後に来たる者, Saigo ni Kitaru mono)
10	November 22, 2010	978-4-8401-3399-9	July 5, 2011	978-1-934876-55-8
54. "Doppelgänger"; 55. "Scheming"; 56. "Like Ann Frank"; 57. "Red Doubt"; 58. "Pandemic"; 59. "Skyscraper Blues"
11	March 24, 2011	978-4-8401-3780-5	January 3, 2012	978-1-935934-04-2
60. "Torturous Ties" (絆は苛む, Kizuna wa Sainamu); 61. "Her World" (彼女の世界, Kanojo no Sekai); 62. "Silent Battle" (静かなる決闘, Shizukanarukettō); 63. "Runaway Squad" (RUNAWAY SQUAD); 64. "Exit through the Vampire Bund" (Exit through the Vampire Bund); Special: "The Road to First Love"
12	September 22, 2011	978-4-8401-4041-6	June 2, 2012	978-1-935934-72-1
65. "New York, New York"; 66. "A Verdant Hell"; 67. "Machinations"; 68. "For You, A Thousand Times"; 69. "Escape From the Tiger's Lair"; 70. "El Dorado"
13	March 23, 2012	978-4-8401-4445-2	October 2, 2012	978-1-937867-02-7
71. "Call for Awakening" (目覚めよと呼ぶ声あり, Mezameyo to yobu koe ari); 72. "A Reason to Die" (死ぬこととみつけたり, Shinu koto to Mitsuke tari); 73. "Contagion" (Contagion ～伝染～, Contagion ~Densen~); 74. "Ordinary People" (Ordinary People ～普通の人々～, Ōdinarī Pīpuru ~Futsūnohitobito~); 75. "Abyss" (ABYSS ～深淵～, Abisu ~Shin'en~)
14	October 23, 2012	978-4-8401-4741-5	May 7, 2013	978-1-937867-26-3
76. "A Long-Ago Promise" (遠い約束, Tōi Yakusoku); 77. "As a Human" (人間(ひと)として, Hito Toshite); 78. "Straw Dog" (藁(わら)の犬, Wara no Inu); 79. "At Tel Meggido" (メギドの丘にて, Megido no Oka nite); 80. "Return of the Queen" (王女の帰還, Ōjo no Kikan); 81. "The Life of a Flower" (花の生涯, Hana no Shōgai); 82. "All Good Things..." (All Good Things…)

=== Omnibus ===
Seven Seas compiled the series into five omnibus volumes between 2012 and 2014.

No.	English release date	English ISBN
01	December 11, 2012	978-1-937867-04-1
02	February 19, 2013	978-1-937867-24-9
03	August 6, 2013	978-1-937867-75-1
04	November 5, 2013	978-1-937867-85-0
05	April 1, 2014	978-1-626920-21-7

== Dive in the Vampire Bund ==
Dive in the Vampire Bund was published between 2010 and 2013. Seven Seas licensed it in 2010. It was collected into two tankōbon volumes.

No.	Original release date	Original ISBN	English release date	English ISBN
01	January 23, 2010	978-4-8401-2964-0	March 29, 2011 (1st edition); October 15, 2013 (2nd edition)	978-1-934876-38-1; 978-1-626920-17-0
1. "Magical Mystery Tour"; 2. "Baptism"; 3. "The Underground Kingdom"; 4. "The Queen & I"; 5. "The Child"; 6. "Night on the Planet"; 7. "Human Farm"; 8. "Labyrinth"; 9. "The Fortress Guard"; 10. "The Rose in the Sky"; Epilogue: "What a Wonderful World"
02	March 23, 2013	978-4-8401-5037-8	October 15, 2013	978-1-626920-18-7
11. "Dancing in the Moonlight"; 12. "Cross the Sea"; 13. "The Man Called a "Monster" Part 1"; 14. "The Man Called a "Monster" Part 2"; 15. "Song to Soothe a Child's Heart"; 16. "Diving in the Hell Blaze"; "Epilogue"

== Dance in the Vampire Bund: The Memories of Sledgehammer ==
Dance in the Vampire Bund: The Memories of Sledgehammer ran in Comic Flapper between November 5, 2012, and November 5, 2013. Seven Seas licensed the series in October 2013. The series was published as three collected volumes.

No.	Original release date	Original ISBN	English release date	English ISBN
01	March 23, 2013	978-4-8401-5038-5	December 3, 2013	978-1-626920-19-4
1. "The Man Named "Hammer"" (その男、ハマー, Sono Otoko, Hamā); 2. "A Man of the Shadows"; 3. "An Illusionary Man"; 4. "A Man of Change"
02	August 23, 2013	978-4-8401-5308-9	March 18, 2014	978-1-626920-20-0
5. "Shieldman" (楯の男, Tate no Otoko); 6. "Wounded Man" (傷だらけの男, Kizu-darake no Otoko); 7. "A Girl From the Past" (過去から来た少女, Kako Kara Kita Shōjo); 8. "Men & Women" (男たち女たち, Otoko-tachi On'na-tachi)
03	December 21, 2013	978-4-04-066120-9	September 23, 2014	978-1-626920-69-9
9. "The Callous City" (非情の街, Hijō no Machi); 10. "Lashou Sentan ~Hard Boiled~"; 11. "Better Tomorrow"; 12. "Bulletproof Soldier"; 13. "Someday, This Love..." (いつの日かこの愛を, Itsunohika kono Ai o)

=== Omnibus ===
Seven Seas published the series as one collected omnibus volume in 2015.

No.	English release date	English ISBN
	September 1, 2015	978-1-626921-51-1

== Dance in the Vampire Bund II: Scarlet Order ==
Dance in the Vampire Bund II: Scarlet Order was published in Comic Flapper between December 5, 2013, and April 4, 2015. Seven Seas licensed the series in June 2014. It was published as four separate volumes.

No.	Original release date	Original ISBN	English release date	English ISBN
01	April 23, 2014	978-4-04-066550-4	December 16, 2014	978-1-626921-38-2
1. "The Curtain Rises Again"; 2. "A Seven Year Vacation"; 3. "Quickening"; 4. "The Lady from the Southeast"
02	August 23, 2014	978-4-04-066836-9	May 19, 2015	978-1-626921-39-9
5. "Un bel dì, vedremo" 6. "A Thousand Years of Solitude"; 7. "The Chase"; 8. "The Lovers' Hour"
03	December 22, 2014	978-4-04-067226-7	October 13, 2015	978-1-626922-02-0
9. "Dear, Dear Heart" (糸(いと)し糸(いと)しと言う心, Itoshi Itoshi to iu Kokoro); 10. "Almost Human"; 11. "An Uninvited Guest"; 12. "Escape Under the Roof"
04	April 23, 2015	978-4-04-067514-5	March 8, 2016	978-1-626922-47-1
13. "Uninvited Guest"; 14. "All About my Mother"; 15. "In the Name of the Father"; 16. "Next to You"; 17. "Scarlet Order"

== Dance in the Vampire Bund: Age of Scarlet Order ==
Dance in the Vampire Bund: Age of Scarlet Order began serialization on TO Books' Nico Nico Seiga-based online magazine Comic Corona on May 28, 2018. Seven Seas announced their license to the title in March 2019.

No.	Original release date	Original ISBN	English release date	English ISBN
01	December 1, 2018	978-4-86472-766-2	March 31, 2020	978-1-64275-333-2
1. "In the Realms of the Unreal"; 2. "Storm Warning"; 3. "Handsome Women"; 4. "Queen of the Jungle"; 5. "Ghosts of the ground"; Appendix: "Dance with the Vampire Maids"
02	May 25, 2019	978-4-86472-810-2	June 16, 2020	978-1-64505-199-2
6. "Those Who Confront"; 7. "Fools' Game"; 8. "The Catcher in Manhattan"; 9. "Escape from N.Y."; 10. "Trust me, Trust you"; Appendix: "Dance with the Vampire Maids"
03	October 15, 2019	978-4-86472-859-1	October 27, 2020	978-1-64505-734-5
11. "Ronde Du Petit Chien"; 12. "Only You Are Not Within My Reach"; 13. "Little Hounds, Run! Run!"; 14. "Departures"; Appendix: "Dance with the Vampire Maids"
04	March 14, 2020	978-4-86472-936-9	November 2, 2021	978-1-64827-080-2
15. "The Call of the Wild"; 16. "My Life as a Dog"; 17. "White Fang"; 18. "Echoes from a Memory"; Extra: "Hush Puppies!"; Appendix: "Dance with the Vampire Maids"
05	August 1, 2020	978-4-86699-032-3	February 1, 2022	978-1-64827-325-4
19. "Fugitives in the Snowfield"; 20. "Dark Myth"; 21. "A Wolf in Sheep's Clothing"; 22. "The Ordeal of the Past"; 23. "The Sin of Lying, the Punishment of Silence"; Appendix: "Dance with the Vampire Kids"
06	January 15, 2021	978-4-86699-109-2	May 3, 2022	978-1-63858-221-2
24. "THE KIDS ARE ALL RIGHT"; 25. ""; 26. "Little Seekers"; 27. ""; Appendix: "Dance with the Vampire Maids"
07	June 15, 2021	978-4-86699-246-4	December 27, 2022	978-1-63858-600-5
28. ""; 29. ""; 30. ""; 31. ""; 32. ""; Appendix: "Dance with the Vampire Kids"
08	October 1, 2021	978-4-86699-338-6	May 2, 2023	978-1-68579-504-7
33. "Keep your distance Side A & B"; 34. ""; 35. ""; 36. "Scheherazade"; 37. ""; Appendix: "Dance with the Vampire Kids"
09	March 1, 2022	978-4-86699-462-8	August 22, 2023	978-1-68579-910-6
38. ""; 39. ""; 40. ""; 41. ""; 42. ""; Appendix: "Dance with the Vampire Maids"
10	August 1, 2022	978-4-86699-627-1	December 19, 2023	978-1-68579-911-3
43. ""; 44. ""; 45. ""; 46. ""; 47. ""; Appendix: "Dance with the Vampire Maids"
11	February 1, 2023	978-4-86699-762-9	April 30, 2024	979-8-88843-347-8
12	April 1, 2023	978-4-86699-825-1	August 27, 2024	979-8-88843-961-6
13	August 1, 2023	978-4-86699-909-8	December 31, 2024	979-8-89160-518-3
14	December 1, 2023	978-4-86794-017-4	April 29, 2025	979-8-89160-938-9
15	August 1, 2024	978-4-86794-266-6	September 9, 2025	979-8-89373-610-6
16	September 2, 2024	978-4-86794-297-0	December 30, 2025	979-8-89373-611-3
17	January 15, 2025	978-4-86794-418-9	April 7, 2026	979-8-89561-452-5
18	May 1, 2025 (digital)	—	July 28, 2026	979-8-89765-114-6
19	September 1, 2025 (digital)	978-4-86794-682-4	—	—
20	January 15, 2026 (digital)	978-4-86794-840-8	—	—
21	July 15, 2026 (digital)	978-4-86854-063-2	—	—

== Dōjinshi ==
Tadano published a number of Dance in the Vampire Bund dōjinshi at Comiket; these were collected and released as two separate volumes by Seven Seas.

No.	Title	English release date	English ISBN
01	Dance in the Vampire Bund: Forgotten Tales	June 17, 2014	978-1-626920-51-4
02	Dance in the Vampire Bund: Secret Chronicles	October 21, 2014	978-1-626920-62-0
1. "Night & Darkness"; 2. "Death of a Salaryman"; 3. "Of Endless Silence and Repose"; 4. "Lies & Silence"; 5. "S.A.G.A Cooking Class"; 6. "A Flag Full of Stars"; 7. "Time to Hunt"; 8. "The Sun Beyond the Window"; 9. "Apples From a Tree"; 10. "The Manchurian Candidate"; 11. "Les Enfants Terribles"; 12. "Hematologie du Gout"; 13. "An Afternoon with the Wolves"; 14. "Ever After"; 15. "Walking the Beat"; 16. "A Fine and Private Place"; 17. "The Moonlit Classroom"; 18. "Doujinshi Chronicle"
