= Nozomu Tamaki =

Japanese manga artist

Nozomu Tamaki (環望, Tamaki Nozomu; born October 7, 1966, in Setagaya, Tokyo, Japan) is a Japanese manga artist. His most notable work, Dance in the Vampire Bund, was licensed in English by Seven Seas Entertainment and adapted into a 12-episode anime series by the studio Shaft.

== Works ==
=== Mainstream ===
Title	In collaboration with	Start	End	Publisher	English publisher	Magazine	Vols.	Ref.
Reverser: Jikū no Ryūkihei (リバーサー―時空の竜騎兵)	Hiroshi Yamaguchi (concept)	September 1991	April 1994	Shogakukan	—N/a	Popcom	4	
Seiken’ō Shigurīdo (聖剣王シグリード)	Yuka Minagawa (story)	February 1995	July 1995	Tokuma Shoten	—N/a	Monthly Manga Boys	2	
Shōgeki Kishi Dan – Impacts Knights (スーパーロボット大戦IMPACTコミック 衝撃騎士団 インパクト・ナイツ)	—N/a	2003	2003	Futabasha	—N/a	Unknown	1	
Dance in the Vampire Bund (ダンス イン ザ ヴァンパイアバンド)	—N/a	December 5, 2005	September 5, 2012	Media Factory	Seven Seas Entertainment	Monthly Comic Flapper	14	
Hakodate Yōnin Buraijō Himegami (箱館妖人無頼帖 ヒメガミ)	—N/a	October 2007	March 2009	Kodansha	—N/a	Monthly Magazine Z	5	
Dive in the Vampire Bund (ダイブ イン ザ ヴァンパイアバンド)	—N/a	January 2010	March 2013	Media Factory	Seven Seas Entertainment	Unknown	2	
Lily Trigger (リリィ・トゥリガー)	Yūshi Kanoe (art)	2010	April 7, 2011	Kadokawa Shoten	—N/a	Unknown	2	
Angel Para Bellum (エンジェルパラベラム)	Kent Minami (story)	March 12, 2011	September 12, 2012	Flex Comix	Seven Seas Entertainment (Note: Seven Seas published two of the series' three volumes before the Japanese publisher stopped allowing overseas licensing.)	Comic Blood	3	
Dance in the Vampire Bund: The Memories of Sledgehammer (ダンス イン ザ ヴァンパイアバンド スレッジ・ハマーの追憶)	—N/a	November 5, 2012	November 5, 2013	Media Factory	Seven Seas Entertainment	Monthly Comic Flapper	3	
Hard Nerd Daddy -Hatarake! Otaku!!- (ハード・ナード・ダディ - 働け！ オタク!! -)	—N/a	May 10, 2013	2013	Shōnen Gahōsha	—N/a	Young Comic Cherry	1	
Dance in the Vampire Bund II: Scarlet Order (スカーレット オーダー ダンス イン ザ ヴァンパイアバンド2)	—N/a	December 5, 2013	April 4, 2015	Media Factory	Seven Seas Entertainment	Monthly Comic Flapper	4	
Don't Meddle With My Daughter (ウチのムスメに手を出すな！, Uchi no Musume ni Te o Dasu na!)	—N/a	January 6, 2014	May 9, 2015	Shōnen Gahōsha	Seven Seas Entertainment	Young Comic	3	
Soul Liquid Chambers (ソウルリキッドチェインバーズ)	—N/a	April 16, 2016	July 15, 2017	Shōnen Gahōsha	Seven Seas Entertainment	Young King Ours GH	3	
Dance in the Vampire Bund: Age of Scarlet Order (ダンス イン ザ ヴァンパイアバンド A.S.O)	—N/a	May 28, 2018	—	TO Books	Seven Seas Entertainment	Comic Corona	10	

=== Doujinshi ===
- Ne-To-Ge (2007, Shōnen Gahōsha)
- Scandal Shiyō yo (2006, Wani Magazine), sequel of Kokuminteki Kanojo
- Narikiri Lovers (2006, Takeshobo)
- Coneco!! (2005, Takeshobo), same universe as Anego!
- Kyō wa Nani Shiyō (2005, Futabasha)
- Jōō-sama tte Yobanaide! (2004, Ohzora Shuppan), story: Marrie Nekosensha
- Anego! (2004–2005, serialized in Vitamin, Takeshobo)
- Hataraku Megami-sama (2004, Wani Magazine)
- Nanairo Karen (2003, Futabasha)
- Kokuminteki Kanojo (2003, Wani Magazine)
- Maid de Ikimasshoi! (2003, serialized in Vitamin, Takeshobo)
- Freaks Dorm (2002, Futabasha)
- Iki o Hisomete Idakuite (2001, Angel Shuppan)
- Dare ka no Onna (2001, Takeshobo)
- Kawaii Hito (2000, Angel Shuppan), (2004 reprint, Futabasha)
- Oshigoto Shinakya ne - Let's Love Work (2000, Takeshobo)
- Kimi ga Karada de Uso o Tsuku (2000, Angel Shuppan), (2004 reprint, Futabasha)
- Ura Ura Jungle Heat: Mitsurin Princess (1999, Angel Shuppan)
- Ii Koto Shinai ka Koneko-chan (1999, Daitosha), (2002 reprint, Daitosha)
- Hito ni Ienai Aidakara (1998, Angel Shuppan), (2003 reprint, Futabasha)
- Femme Kabuki (姫カブキ恋道中 Hime Kabuki Rendōchū; 1998–1999, serialized in Men’s Action, Futabasha)
- Gomen ne Acchie: Koko ni KISS shite (1999, Angel Shuppan), (2002 reprint, Souryuusha)
- Gomen ne Acchie (1998, Angel Shuppan), (2002 reprint, Souryuusha)
