= Sennen Kitsune =

Japanese manga series by Rokurō Chō

- Sennen Kitsune: Kanpō "Sōjinki" yori
- First tankōbon volume cover

千年狐 ～干宝「捜神記」より～
- Genre: Comedy; Historical fantasy
- Manga
- Written by: Rokurō Chō
- Published by: Media Factory
- Imprint: MF Comics Flapper Series
- Magazine: Monthly Comic Flapper
- Original run: April 5, 2018 – present
- Volumes: 14

Sennen Kitsune: Kanpō "Sōjinki" yori (千年狐 ～干宝「捜神記」より～) is a Japanese manga series written and illustrated by Rokurō Chō. It was originally published as a one-shot in Media Factory's Monthly Comic Flapper magazine in December 2017. It later began serialization in the same magazine in April 2018. The series is based on the 4th-century Chinese novel In Search of the Supernatural.

== Plot ==
Set in Imperial China, the series focuses on a prankster fox spirit named Guangtian who has lived for thousands of years, and loves playing tricks on humans.

== Characters ==
Guangtian (廣天)
Voiced by: Hiromi Igarashi (voice comic)
Zhanghua (張華)
Voiced by: Daiki Hamano (voice comic)
Huabiao (華表)
Voiced by: Takaya Hashi (voice comic)
Kongzhang (孔章)
Voiced by: Kenichi Ono (voice comic)

== Media ==
=== Manga ===
Written and illustrated by Rokurō Chō, Sennen Kitsune: Kanpō "Sōjinki" yori was initially published as a one-shot in Media Factory's Monthly Comic Flapper magazine on December 5, 2017. It later began serialization in the same magazine on April 5, 2018. Its chapters have been compiled into fourteen tankōbon volumes as of September 2026.

| No. | Release date | ISBN |
|---|---|---|
| 1 | November 21, 2018 | 978-4-04-065268-9 |
| 2 | August 23, 2019 | 978-4-04-065880-3 |
| 3 | February 22, 2020 | 978-4-04-064338-0 |
| 4 | July 22, 2020 | 978-4-04-064571-1 |
| 5 | May 21, 2021 | 978-4-04-680418-1 |
| 6 | December 23, 2021 | 978-4-04-680962-9 |
| 7 | April 21, 2022 | 978-4-04-681335-0 |
| 8 | November 22, 2022 | 978-4-04-681894-2 |
| 9 | April 21, 2023 | 978-4-04-682374-8 |
| 10 | September 22, 2023 | 978-4-04-682808-8 |
| 11 | January 22, 2025 | 978-4-04-684437-8 |
| 12 | July 23, 2025 | 978-4-04-684943-4 |
| 13 | September 23, 2025 | 978-4-04-685114-7 |
| 14 | September 18, 2026 | 978-4-04-660461-3 |

=== Other ===
A promotional video commemorating the first reprint of the first volume was released on the Kadokawa Anime YouTube channel on March 21, 2019. The PV is narrated by Hiromi Igarashi.

A voice comic adaptation was also released on the same YouTube channel on June 3, 2022. The voice comic consists of performances by Igarashi, Takaya Hashi, Daiki Hamano, and Kenichi Ono.

== Reception ==
The series was nominated for the fifth Next Manga Awards in 2019 in the print category and was ranked 16th out of 50 nominees.
