= Love Bullet =

Japanese manga series

- First tankōbon volume cover, featuring Koharu

ラブ・バレット (Note: stylized as ラブ♡バレット) (Rabu Baretto)
- Genre: Action; Supernatural; Yuri
- Manga
- Written by: inee
- Published by: Media Factory
- English publisher: NA: Yen Press
- Magazine: Monthly Comic Flapper
- Original run: October 5, 2023 – present
- Volumes: 2

Love Bullet (Japanese: ラブ・バレット, Hepburn: Rabu Baretto; stylized as LOVE-BULLET) is a Japanese manga series written and illustrated by inee. It began serialization in Media Factory's Monthly Comic Flapper magazine in October 2023, with its chapters collected in two tankōbon volumes. It follows the story of Koharu, a teenage girl who is reborn as a Cupid, an immortal being whose job is to help humans fall in love. By completing missions and collecting karma, Koharu has a chance to return to her human life.

== Synopsis ==
=== Setting ===
Cupids are immortal winged creatures, who are reincarnated humans who had died early without having experienced romance. They coexist with the physical world to help people to fall in love for the sake of the Goddess of Love. While former Cupids used bows and arrows, present Cupids use guns, sniper rifles, and bombs to make people fall in love. Cupids can hide their wings by folding them in to interact with humans.

The Cupids work secretly among human beings and must first find the right pair for matchmaking before shooting because their bullets can only affect the right couples. They can collect their matchmaking assignments from a central bulletin board, which lists all available assignments. Cupids earn karma by solving humans' romantic struggles, and upon earning enough karma, a they resume their life in the current timeline at the same age they died. However, they also need to spend their earned karma to cover their operational costs.

=== Plot ===
Koharu Sakurada is a 15-year-old high school student whose matchmaking skills are famous even though she does not have any romantic experience of her own. Koharu sacrifices herself to save her best friend, Aki Tamaki, from a falling metal pole at the construction site. She is met by the Goddess of Love, who offers her a second chance at a human life. Five years later, she is reborn as a Cupid – an immortal, winged sniper whose goal is to make humans fall in love with each other through special guns.

After her revival, Koharu takes on her first matchmaking duty, with Kanna watching over her. Kanna explains that Koharu's best friend whom she saved before dying – Aki – is in college, and remains committed to Koharu's memory. Koharu successfully identifies a partner for Aki, a fellow college student by the name of Sakura Kasuga. Unfortunately, her duty gets interrupted when Chiyo, a hyperactive Cupid always looking for a gunfight with other Cupids, causes chaos that disrupts their mission. Kanna holds her back and defeats her, allowing Koharu to continue the matchmaking.

Later, Chiyo gives Koharu and Kanna a challenge where, due to Chiyo's trickery, both Kanna and Koharu lose. Because of this, she orders them to accompany her in a village during a school field day to bring two students together – Ito Kitano and Touma Azuma. On getting there, they discover that the village is the exclusive property of Ena, another Cupid who jealously guards her territory. After some bickering, they agree to work together in the matchmaking. During the process, Koharu realizes that Ena attended the same school as her former classmates, who believed that she was in the hospital.

== Characters ==
=== Cupids ===
Koharu Sakurada (桜田コハル, Sakurada Koharu)
Koharu is the main protagonist. She is a 15-year-old girl who is popular for her matchmaking ability, though she has never fallen in love herself. After saving her best friend from a construction site accident, Koharu is caught and impaled by a metal rod and passes away. After five years, the Goddess of Love offers Koharu a second chance at life by transforming her into a Cupid. With the help of three other Cupids, Koharu learns to select suitable matches for humans.
Kanna (カンナ)
Kanna is Koharu's primary mentor who welcomes Koharu into her new life as a Cupid. Though laid-back and borderline lazy, she is resolved to teach and protect Koharu as well as she can.
Chiyo (チヨ)
Chiyo is a combative, energetic Cupid who enjoys the thrill of completing assignments more than the act of matchmaking itself, often challenging her peers to gunfights.
Ena Hasumi (蓮見エナ, Hasumi Ena)
Ena is a logical, focused Cupid with a mysterious past. She is independent in her own territory, committed to her own missions. Chiyo, Koharu, and Kanna stumble upon Ena in her domain on a mission to set up two high schoolers. Later on, it is revealed that she is a fairly young Cupid.

=== Other characters ===
Aki Tamaki (珠城 秋, Tamaki Aki)
Aki is Koharu's best friend from school. She confesses her feelings to Koharu, but the moment is interrupted when a pole falls from a construction site overhead. Koharu pushes her out of the way, saving her life. Tamaki carries her feelings for Koharu for five years, until the now-turned-Cupid Koharu helps her find a new match.
Sakura Kasuga (春日 さくら, Kasuga Sakura)
A college student that attends to the same university as Aki Tamaki. She has a romantic interest on Aki and she becomes matched with Aki by Koharu when Koharu during her first first mission.
Ito Kitano (北野 いと, Kitano Ito)
A high school girl who comes from a village setting. She is the object of affection for an mission that Chiyo, Koharu, and Kanna arrange during a field day activity in Ena's domain.
Touma Azuma (東 斗真, Azuma Tōma)
A high school student who is a classmate of Ito Kitano. They are match-made by Ito with the help of Koharu, Kanna, Chiyo, and Ena.

== Publication ==
Written and illustrated by inee, the series began serialization in Media Factory's Monthly Comic Flapper magazine on October 5, 2023. Its chapters have been collected into two tankōbon volumes as of June 2026.

During their panel at MCM Comic Con London 2025, Yen Press announced that they had licensed the manga adaptation for English publication, beginning November 2025. As of June 2026, one English-language volume has been released.

=== Volumes ===
No.	Original release date	Original ISBN	English release date	English ISBN
1	July 22, 2024	978-4-04-683627-4	December 9, 2025	979-8-8554-3030-1
Chapter 0: "A Cupid's Solution to a Love Triangle"; Chapter 1: "To Fall in Love with Love..."; Chapter 2: "The Modern-Day Cupid (Part One)"; Chapter 3: "The Modern-Day Cupid (Part Two)"; Chapter 4: "Cupid vs. Cupid (Part One)"; Chapter 5: "Cupid vs. Cupid (Part Two)"; Chapter 6: "See You Later"; Bonus: "The Daily Life of Cupids ➀"
2	November 21, 2025	978-4-04-684926-7	October 27, 2026	979-8-8554-4149-9
Chapter 7: "A Cupid's Promise"; Chapter 8: "Shoot-off!!"; Chapter 9: "Field Trip"; Chapter 10: "Mismatch"; Chapter 11: "Compatibility"; Chapter 12: "A Cupid's Territory"; Chapter 13: "Cowardice and Courage"; Chapter 14: "Hasumi"; Bonus: "The Daily Life of Cupids ②"

== Reception ==
On September 17, 2024, the Love Bullet author posted a comic on Twitter explaining that volume one sales were low, implying that the series could face cancellation. Following this announcement, volume one sold out at multiple retailers, including Manga Republic and CDJapan.

The series was ranked tenth in AnimeJapan's "Manga We Want to See Animated" poll in 2025. The series has been nominated for the 11th Next Manga Awards in the print category in 2025.
