= List of Dance in the Vampire Bund characters =

This page lists the characters that appear in the Dance in the Vampire Bund manga and anime series created by Nozomu Tamaki.

== Main characters ==
Mina Țepeș (ミナ・ツェペッシュ, Mina Tsepesshu)
Voiced by: Aoi Yūki (Japanese); Monica Rial (English)
Wilhelmina Vlad "Mina" Țepeș is the female protagonist of the series and the current ruler of Earth's Vampires. She usually appears in a young and prepubescent state, though she is not shy enough to feel embarrassed when naked and is centuries old. Mina can act aggressive, cocky, arrogant, and naughty, and her high birth often shows through in her sense of entitlement and condescension towards Akira's relative youth and subsequent lack of political savvy when he confronts her on her kidnapping.
However, she actually feels vulnerable and lonely. She cares very much for the welfare of her people and does everything in her power, no matter how unscrupulous, to protect and preserve her species and their greater good. Mina sympathizes towards the Fangless, creating a city underneath the Bund where they can live freely and without persecution.
It is revealed that she is in love with Akira since first meeting him or related to him in a close fashion, to the point her secret room is covered from floor to ceiling with nothing but pictures of him.
Her soul's true form is an adult, voluptuous, nude version of herself with knee-length blonde hair, an ebony structure covering half her body, and black bat-like wings. She wishes to have this form kept a secret, as that form's body is able to give birth while her 'child' form cannot due to her small frame. If the Three Nobles found out, they could force her into marrying one of them and producing a child with the excuse that it's to preserve the Pure Royal Bloodline. She's not supposed to have a child with anyone else as they are the only other "True Bloods" like her. Although the Bloodline is in peril because they not only killed her mother, all the other vampire clans are as well. In the manga it's revealed that their excuse for killing Lucretia was because Mina's father wasn't one of them, and therefore was that of a commoner. Although who the father was is either not known or hasn't been revealed yet.
Mina's name can be derived from the Vlad the Impaler story and Count Dracula. Her surname, Țepeș, is the Romanian word for Impaler, the reason Vlad the Impaler is called Vlad Țepeș. Her given name "Mina" is shared by Mina Murray, the woman that Dracula sought to have as his new bride in the original novel.
Mina is a terrible cook, as vampires have no sense of taste, and thus has no experience making food. This results in some humorous mishaps during cooking class, as she can't even tell what some of the cooking utensils are for. During the overnight with Yuki, she made Akira a dish, but used too much spice.
Mina Țepeș appears in the story "The Adventure of the Sussex Vampire" in the series Young Miss Holmes.

Akira Kaburagi Regendorf (暁・鏑木・レーゲンドルフ, Akira Kaburagi Rēgendorufu)
Voiced by: Yuichi Nakamura (Japanese); Eric Vale (English)
The male protagonist of the series. A young werewolf who is the son of Wolfgang and thus is well trained. He has undergone training to identify almost all explosives, learning how to sniff them out. He cannot however disarm them as he only took the canine part of the program. He is a kind person, determined to protect Mina, with whom he is in love. He first met Mina when he was a baby, but doesn't remember. They meet again in a garden when Akira was 10 years old. He promised to always be by Mina's side and protect her, even at the cost of his life.
When his 17th birthday came, he was required to be Mina's servant, thus fulfilling the covenant between werewolves and the Queen of the Vampires. At first he was not really happy about it, but he eventually agreed. Akira and Mina had some problems between them, but they solved it and along the way their love for each other grew. He also cares deeply about Yuki, but rejected her confession due to being a werewolf and his feelings to Mina. Later in the manga, Akira offered his blood to Mina in order to save her, which resulted in him transforming into a stronger werewolf/vampire hybrid.
In the anime, he lost all of his memories one year ago, and did not even know he was a werewolf until episode 2. It is later revealed he lost his memory due to extreme psychological trauma. Normally werewolves who are mentally unstable are killed (considering how dangerous an insane human can be, even more so a werewolf) but he was allowed to live because of his importance to Mina.

Yuki Saegusa (三枝 由紀, Saegusa Yuki)
Voiced by: Chiwa Saitō (Japanese); Alexis Tipton (English)
A human student at the school founded by Princess Mina Țepeș. She is Mina's and Akira's classmate as well as a member of the Student Council. She was for a time being the only member after the vampire attack at the church Nanami Shinonome which resulted in the resignation of all other members shortly thereafter. Nanami returned as Student Council President after the incident with Hysterica. She gave Akira a silver ring (which he wore in a bag around his neck as werewolves are allergic to silver) as a symbol of their relationship, which later she gave to Mina as a symbol of their new friendship.
She was at first frightened by vampires, but grows to accept them after spending time with Mina. Through this Yuki appears to gain a very close friendship with Mina patterned after Anne Shirley and Diana Barry in "Anne of Green Gables", even inviting her to spend the night at her house. Yuki's willing loyalty to Mina is later made absolutely clear when Yuki suffers a closed head injury and is left with aphasia (inability to speak) and paralyzed from the waist down, yet risks her life several times in an effort to tell Akira that this Mina is an impostor and that the real one was kidnapped. As a result of her head injury, Yuki has been infected with 'Pied Piper' nanomachines which are slowly repairing or replacing the damaged areas of her brain. As an accommodation for her aphasia, the nanomachines currently also allow her to emit an infrared beam from her right eye allowing her to communicate via a specially-configured laptop she names "Anne" in honor of Anne Frank having convinced Mina to read it. This clues her into the impostor as she had discussed the name with the real Mina who would've known and not needed to guess about which 'Anne' the computer was named after.
As of the end of Volume 14, Yuki has been freed by the return of Princess Mina, and regained her ability to speak in time to save the Princess from an attack. Yuki is also an amateur novelist, and has quite a following in the Bund prior to the invasion by Inanovic. It is suggested she writes yaoi with the protagonist based on Akira, much to his horror. She was embarrassed to learn Mina had shared her novel with the bund (the maids are her biggest fans who even faked reasons for having her sign for things to get her autograph) and horrified to learn Mina had translated and shared it with the world. Akira is upset over some of the wild ideas Yuki and Mina came up with in the Chairman's office. After her head injury, the maids make a syllabus to help her write her next novel until she got the computer. Is referred to by the maids as 'Maestro' due to her novels.
Yuki is the narrator of the animated story, in which version it is also revealed that she was once Akira's girlfriend, a relationship clearly not part of the manga. In the anime, the relationship between Mina and Yuki grows through teaming up in cooking class rather than a sleepover.

== Vampires ==
Vampires can be both born or created from humans. In the former case, 'True Blooded' vampires descended from a progenitor paternal figure continue through the female line, currently represented by Mina. In the latter case, vampirism appears to have an infectious aetiology, possibly a form of retrovirus. Unlike many vampire stories, transformation into a vampire is not a conscious decision but rather is caused by a vampire feeding off of a human. In recent years a "vaccine" has been developed to prevent transformation, but is only effective for up to 48 hours from the time of infection. In all cases a human turned into a vampire who is not cured with the vaccine has a genetically coded mandate to unilaterally and unconditionally obey the person who turned them into vampires. While vampires can be "reprogrammed" using different DNA to allow them to switch allegiances they retain this mandate for absolute obedience, which leaves them entirely at the mercy of the vampire they are currently programmed to obey.

Compared to humans, vampire emotions are significantly more potent, causing many vampires to become violent, gluttonous for blood, and very often sexual deviants, in an effort to satiate those powerful urges; however, there also are vampires – chiefly among them those who were turned against their wills – who instead choose to become "Fangless", pulling their own fangs in order to hold onto their former human values. Such vampires face persecution from both sides, however, human and vampire alike; it is revealed early on that the creation of the Bund was in large part to provide a haven for the Fangless to live peacefully.

All vampires have a 'True Form', which is a physical representation of their innermost self, and is a very similar transformation to that of werewolves. This form can be almost anything, from a giant bat, to a lizard, to a spider, to, in Mina's case, a succubus-like figure. Very few of the vampires in the story have shown their true forms. Similar to other fictional vampires, Dance vampires are considerably more physically powerful than humans in both strength and speed; able to lift heavy objects such as cars as well as overpower and outrun humans with ease. They possess remarkable regenerative abilities to such an extent where they cannot catch common diseases such as the cold and the cells of their bodies remain active even within a part of their body that has been severed; thus, a vampire may reattach a severed limb without so much as a scar. Vampires are also considerably agile, able to leap several feet into the air in a single bound and perform parkour and acrobatic feats with relative ease without tire.

In addition to human-derived vampires, there are also the "True Bloods": vampire families who possess "pure" vampiric ancestry, undiluted by human blood, whether by mating with humans or by being transformed. These are the most powerful of all Vampires in the world, but are restricted by tradition and codes of conduct when it comes to dealing with each other. Vampire blood-purity dilutes over the generations. This has resulted in a strictly hierarchical, almost feudal society where the older, higher vampires of purer-blood reign over the younger, lower vampires of weaker-blood. This has caused great resentment on the part of the weak-blooded vampires, who are often treated as second-class citizens and even slaves, even though they are officially recognized as an essential part of vampire society as laborers, soldiers and servitors. As a result of this class-dynamic, the lower vampires often occupy the ranks of rebels, rogues and murderers within the vampire community as well as a threat to humans.

In the storyline, currently the vampire world is ruled by the royal family, the Țepeș represented now by Mina. There are only three male "true blood" nobles left: Rozenmann, Ivanovic, and Li.

The "Dance" vampires are best classified as "living vampires", sexually reproduce, and are still living despite being able to live with injuries fatal to humans. In one notable instance, a vampire had her organs removed to hide a bomb within her body.

=== Țepeș Royal Family ===
The Țepeș are the royal family that rules over the Vampire world. Currently, there is only one member of the royal family left.

Lucretia (ルクレツィア, Rukuretsia)
Lucretia Țepeș was the previous ruler of the Vampire Kingdom and Mina's mother. Not much is known about her, other than that she looks very similar to Mina's true form. She was killed at the hands of the Three Clans.

=== The Three Clans ===
The Three Clans are the most powerful of the vampire clans, save for the Royal Family itself, and are led by Rozenmann, Ivanovic, and Li. It is revealed that prior to the story, the three lords devoured the other noble clans and pursued the Royal Family. They succeeded in their campaign resulting in the extinction of the "true bloods" and the death of Queen Lucretia. However to keep the true bloodline, one is to be married to and shall bear a child with Mina, as she is the only true-blood female vampire left. In the anime, it is heavily suggested one or all of them are controlling Telomere, a terrorist group created to kill Mina. Also in the anime, they all are forced to swear their allegiance to Mina once their assassins are all defeated by Akira.

Rozenmann (ローゼンマン, Rōzenman)
Voiced by: Kenji Hamada (Japanese); Todd Haberkorn (English)
Lord Rozenmann first appears dressed in a white, western-style suit with a cape over his shoulders, his left eye covered by an eyepatch. He appears to be the calmest and most amiable of the three lords, showing civility even to those considered "beneath" him (such as Veratos, a "commoner", and Akira who is a werewolf), and maintaining his demeanor even as one of his servants is immolated by sunlight in front of him; the only time he ever appears anything other than perfectly composed, is surprise at the sight of Akira's return after defeating the three assassins sent after him. He kidnapped Mina and helped her identical impostor take control of the Bund. However, Akira and Nanami managed to infiltrate his castle and save her before Rozenmann was able to freeze Mina in her true form and impregnate her.

Ivanovic (イワノヴ, Iwanovu)
Voiced by: Kissei Kumamoto (Japanese); Patrick Seitz (English)
Lord Ivanovic appears dressed mostly in black with a silver cross hanging from his neck. He also appears older and hunched over. Lord Ivanovic has a very aggressive and imperious demeanor and looks more as the villain compared to the other two lords. He is revealed in Volume 9 to have once been Grigori Yefimovich Rasputin, insinuating himself into the Romanov dynasty's confidence and controlling them from behind the scenes; upon learning of the coming Bolshevik Revolution, Rasputin sold out the Romanovs and "died", returning as Ivanovic to control yet another regime from the shadows. After learning of Mina's true form, Ivanovic launches an attack on the Bund, climaxing in a final duel to the death with Mina and Akira in the depths of the Cradle, the deepest layer of the Bund, where he is finally defeated and apparently slain. It can be noted that Ivanovic's true vampire form much resembles that of the demon Baphomet. He was mortally wounded by Mina, and her imposter ordered him reduced to his brain and heart in jars. However a shapeshifting minion "saved" him by placing his organs into his/her body. He made one final attempt to breed with Mina, but it was actually her imposter who finally killed him.

Li (李, Ri)
Voiced by: Tora Take (Japanese); Christopher Ayres (English)
Lord Li appears dressed in a Manchu changshan. The area around his mouth is hideously deformed, revealing sharp, pointed teeth which he usually keeps concealed behind an ornate fan. As such, he rarely speaks, preferring to observe the conversation and only contributes when need be. During the wager for possession of Mina's hand, the assassin sent by Li after Akira's life was, in fact, two people in the manga version: a pair of identical twin vampire brothers who shared a powerful psychic bond, such that any injury inflicted on one would also appear on the other, allowing them to masquerade as one person in order to confuse and mislead their target. For this reason, they are referred to as the "Corsican brothers", after the Alexandre Dumas novel of the same name, whose characters shared a similar ability.

=== Maids ===
There are three Maids that are often seen serving Mina. They are often featured in the omake chapters spreading rumors about Akira and are fans of Yuki's manga. They are very strong as they are able to fight off an armed squad by themselves.

Nelly (ネリー, Nerī)
Voiced by: Eri Kitamura (Japanese); Trina Nishimura (English)
The maid with long black hair. She is very devoted to Mina, and dislikes Akira because he is always by her side.

Nella (ネーラ, Nēra)
Voiced by: Akeno Watanabe (Japanese); Terri Doty (English)
Recognized by having her hair covering one of her eyes. She always has a stoic demeanor but is a very caring person. Where after she gave a shot to a boy, notice that she was ordered by Alphonse to bite him in order to turn him into a vampire, which made him cry, she gave him a small teddy bear to make him feel better. She appears to work for Alphonse as well.

Nero (ネロ)
Voiced by: Asuka Tanii (Japanese); Abigail Hartman (English)
She has long chestnut colored hair and more cheerful of the three. She is a big anime fan, spending most of her time with Nanami, now that she is a maid, because she has glasses, big breasts, and is a student council president, considered a "Triple Threat" in the anime world.

=== Other vampires ===
Juneau Dermailles (ジュノー・デルマイユ, Junō Derumaiyu)
Voiced by: Yuzuru Fujimoto (Japanese); Joe West (English)
He is a high-ranking noble who serves the noble family. He has a racist hatred towards Werewolves. He is haughty, snarky, domineering, pompous and publicly disrespectful towards werewolves.

Veratos (ヴェラトゥース, Veratūsu)
Voiced by: Yūko Kaida (Japanese); Carmen Smith (English)
Most often answering to "Vera", she is Mina's most trusted advisor. First introduced as driving Akira to the castle, where she briefly impersonated Mina in order to test Akira's abilities. In the anime this does not happen, and she instead impersonates Mina on the reality TV show in the first episode. Afterwards, she is often seen assisting Mina with her office work as well as being her bodyguard. Akira has commented that she has a cute laugh. She admits to having once been a human who sought to become a vampire out of love for Mina's mother, Lucretia. She is also Hysterica's original Master, having turned her into a vampire after her family had died of the Spanish flu. :During the second Gaiden volume, it is revealed that Vera, as well as Akira Garcia Fujisaki, possesses a rare type of True Form, in which a mist-like substance is exuded from her body, which can then harden into a variety of forms. Vera, along with Mina, appears in "The Adventure of the Sussex Vampire" in the series Young Miss Holmes.

Alphonse Medici Borgiani (アルフォンソ・メディチ・ボルジアーニ, Arufonso Medichi Borujiāni)
Voiced by: Takaya Kuroda (Japanese); J. Michael Tatum (credited as John Knell) (English)
A carefree vampire who is loyal to Mina. He is easily recognized by his white suit and expensive car, a reason he doesn't like the Bund is because the fake blood "Stigma" they spray by blimp always gets all over his car. He states he is a Lord and specializes in secretive dealing for Mina outside the public's knowledge. It was he who planned the temporary transformation of Shoichi's grandson into a vampire for Mina to obtain leverage.

=== Humans who became Vampires ===
The following characters are humans who became vampires:

Akira Garcia Fujisaki (アキラガルシア藤崎, Akiragarushia Fujisaki)
A Japanese/Brazilian teenager. He and another teenager became vampires on a whim. Akira ends up working for Mina Tepes and his friend winds up becoming one of the Fangless.

Nanami Shinonome (東雲 ななみ, Shinonome Nanami)
Voiced by: Shizuka Itō (Japanese); Janae Mason (English)
Also known as "Chairman" or "President" (会長, Kaichō), she was originally a stern, no-nonsense human student who was against the idea of having vampires attend the school, seeing them as making a mockery of all that the school had stood for until then, especially after discovering that the school's chairman and founder was, in fact, a vampire - Mina herself. However, while staying at school late at night, she is attacked by vampires and consequently made into one. Though her original master was defeated, Nanami is soon "overwritten" by another vampire and thus further coerced into serving Mina's enemies. Eventually Nanami is overwritten yet again, this time by Mina, and is able to get some semblance of her life back again, continuing to go to school as Student Council President, but also now serving as a maid for the Țepeș household. :After becoming a vampire, Nanami recognizes her intense love for her younger next-door neighbor Yuzuru, a boy she had previously considered as a little brother to herself. Unprepared for the incredible potency of vampire emotions, Nanami invades Yuzuru's bedroom and very nearly bites the boy before remembering herself and running off. Overcome with revulsion at what she has become, she even pleads at one time with Mina to kill her, rather than "taint" Yuzuru with her shameful lust. Eventually however, she comes to realize that Yuzuru, in fact, returns her feelings, and is allowed to bite him so that they can both be together. Also, because of the age difference between them, Nanami later comes to be labeled a shotacon by Nelly. In the manga, during the attack on the Bund by Ivanovic she is ordered by the clone-Mina, through her infection with the Pied Piper nanomachines, to place the Bund's clandestine nuclear reactor in a critical state but is violently stopped by Yuzuru who is acting under blood-bond orders from Mina. She is last seen falling, presumably to her death. Later, however, she reappears first in New York and then in Rozenmann's castle to assist Akira in rescuing Mina. She explains she had landed onto a ledge a short distance below as she fell and was saved by an unknown benefactor. Said benefactor then equipped her and sent her, along with Mina's three primary maids, to rescue the princess. Nanami is last seen (as of Vol 13) presumably fleeing Rozenmann's castle accompanied by Yuzuru.

Hikosaka (彦坂)
Voiced by: Mitsuhiro Ichiki (Japanese); Greg Ayres (English)
Known as "Hiko" for short by Akira, he is a student who is regularly bullied by his schoolmates. He later becomes a vampire, apparently loving the fact he can now terrify those who once bullied him. However, he soon realizes that life as a vampire is no different than when he was human, and that no matter what he would become, the abuse he suffered would not cease. He became one of Hysterica's pawns in her plan to bomb the Tokyo subway and, after being chased and confronted by Akira, apologized to him before killing himself with the bomb he was carrying.

Yuzuru (ユヅル)
Voiced by: Mika Itō (Japanese); Lynn Lowin (English)
A thirteen-year-old boy (though he appears considerably younger) who was Nanami's next-door neighbor. Because both of their families were often not at home, they would spend time together to where Yuzuru would look up to her as a big sister figure. After Nanami becomes a vampire, he looks for her to the point of putting himself in danger, and later ends up helping Mina and Akira save Nanami. It is revealed that he loves Nanami as much as she does him, and allows himself to be turned into a vampire by Nanami so that they can live together in the Bund. After being forced to attack Nanami, his lover, Yuzuru turns his back on princess Mina and joins Rozenmann. When it is later revealed that Nanami is, in fact, still very much alive, he appears to abandon Rozenmann's service and the two, Yukuru and Nanami, are last seen (as of Volume 13) presumably fleeing Rozenmann's castle via underground passages.

== Werewolves ==
The Earth Clan (地の一族, Chi no Ichizoku) is a family of highly evolved wolves that have developed to look like humans. They have been in the service of the Țepeș family of vampires, particularly Mina Țepeș, for generations; they act as the Țepeș empire's military and special-ops units. They are born with significantly stronger and more resilient bodies than humans, keener senses of smell, hearing and sight (including night vision) slightly above that of wolves, incredible speed and agility sufficient to run up the sides of skyscrapers and leap several feat with a single bound, and can walk around during the day, unlike vampires. Their strength is comparable to that of vampires, if not noticeably above as they can slaughter most weak vampires with ease and with lightning speed, even those in their true form. Werewolves are Immortal as mentioned by Akira in the manga when he said that werewolves are Immortal (although he was leaving silver-related injuries out of this statement). The protagonist, Akira, is the son of the head of the Țepeș Beowulf forces, Wolfgang, and a Japanese woman. Akira has been Mina Țepeș' familiar #1 servant for nearly his entire life. It was revealed in chapter 35 that all members of the earth clan are male. It is also revealed that in order for a Werewolf to reliably sire a werewolf offspring, he must impregnate a woman while in his transformed wolf-man form. Only about 30% of male children become werewolves otherwise. This act is an extremely traumatic effect on the woman which can lead to physical and/or psychological damage. Even simply gestating a werewolf child can have traumatic effects due to the demand for nutrients by the fetus during gestation. Later it is revealed that the lack of female werewolves and incompatibility with vampire blood is due to genetic faults engineered into the werewolves to limit population growth and the prevent werewolf-vampire hybrids. It was also revealed in the manga that before Mina's time, the Earth Clan was evenly divided among the Pure Blood vampires but the royal family destroyed the other branches of the Earth Clan to maintain power. However the Earth Clan themselves secretly accepted the survivors and allowed them to intermingle with the Țepeș Earth Clan. Most of the Werewolves are fully devoted to Mina but there are those that resent the Princess and her ancestor and passively act against her. These Werewolves are called "The Outer Clan."

Wolfgang Regendorf (ヴォルフガング・レーゲンドルフ, Vorufugangu Rēgendorufu)
Voiced by: Jōji Nakata (Japanese); Andre Beyer (English)
Current head of the Beowulfs, Mina's security forces, and Akira's father. He takes his position as the head of the Beowulfs very seriously. Although he doesn't generally show his emotions, he is proud of his son.

Seiji Hama (浜 誠児, Hama Seiji)
A police inspector in Tokyo. He is usually a good-hearted guy but is a fierce fighter, being in special Ops he is able to use a shotgun in many ways to fight. It is later revealed he was originally human but after being transformed he is now some type of were-creature (most likely some sort of feline) and one of the three assassins sent by the royal family to kill Akira. He and Akira fight, though Akira wins. He later reveals he was in charge of the men who attacked Mina's castle at the beginning of the series, and was the one who shot the rocket launcher at Mina. It is later shown he is in a relationship with Reiko Gotoh. After being questioned by Mina, he was allowed to return to his Station in the Bund due to the Beowulfs not wanting to lose someone of his strength, Reiko Gotoh refusing to leave Mina's office until he was released, and on the request of Akira. In the anime, his role as a mentor to Akira and as Rozenmann's assassin is replaced by Mei-Ren.

Angel "Angie" Arvenanto (エンジェル "アンジー"・アルヴェナント, Enjeru "Anjī" Aruvenanto)
A Leading Private from Beowulf's Senatorial Bureau of Investigation, transferred to the Bund to be one of Mina's new bodyguards. Angie is a sweet, courteous, and extremely effeminate 17-year-old young man. It is hinted that he is female, but is actually male. He is very attached to Akira, going so far as to taunt Mina and Yuki with his antics, such as admitting to bathing together or sleeping naked together with Akira. This behavior is later explained that when young werewolves go through their 'rite-of-passage', they are always paired up. The extreme nature of the rite creates a strong psychological bond between the pair. Angie and Akira were paired together during their rite. He is also good at reading people, and was able to get Ryohei back as friends with Akira. It is later revealed that he is a mole for Telomere.

=== Eight Elite ===
The Eight Elite consists of the best hunters in the Earth Clan. Each specializes in different types of weapons. They are also in pairs of two.

==== Team 1 ====
Remus
Voiced by: Takayuki Fujimoto (Japanese); Herb Nadel (English)
He is the leader of the Eight. His weapon of choice is dueling sword.

Romulus
Voiced by: Nobuyuki Kobushi (Japanese); Jojo Krako (English)
His weapon of choice is dueling sword. He wears sun glasses.

==== Team 2 ====
Heinrich
Voiced by: (Japanese); Jackson Frolick (English)
He is a member of Team 2

Leeroy
Voiced by: Hiromu Miyazaki (Japanese); Kevin Douglass (English)
In the manga, he is known for having a weakness for cute things and can give unexpected bear hugs.

==== Team 3 ====
Camille / Kamil
Voiced by: Takayuki Kondō
He is blind and always has his eyes closed. His weapon of choice is dueling sword.

Hyunte
His weapon of choice is lance for melee combat and sniper rifle.

==== Team 4 ====
Goto
His weapon of choice is halberd. Shinva uses his halberd as springboard sometimes.

Shinva / Cinva
Voiced by: (Japanese); Joel McDonald (English)
He is the shortest of the Eight and he wears white mask. His weapon of choice is yatagan. After the timeskip, he pairs with Akira and has a crush on Yuki

== Humans ==
Ryohei Kuze (久世 僚平, Kuze Ryōhei)
Voiced by: Susumu Chiba (Japanese); Mark Graham (English)
At the beginning of the series, he treated Akira as an enemy, but Akira still sees him as a friend. He treats Akira this way because he didn't accept Yuki's feelings and that Akira is Mina's servant, in which Ryohei believes he is siding with the vampires. His hatred towards Vampires is so strong, that he agreed with students beating up Hikosaka because he "associated" with Mina. However, after chatting with Angel, he decided to apologize to Akira, which Akira accepts.

Katsuichi Mizoguchi (溝口 勝一, Mizoguchi Katsuichi)
Voiced by: Jin Urayama (Japanese); Adam Rice (English)
A mid level politician who Mina negotiated to have Fangless vampires to attend school in Japan. He was completely against the idea, believing that all vampires should stay on the Bund. Because of that statement, Mina went as far as to have his grandson turned into a vampire and then quoted his own words on how all vampires should stay in the Bund. He later agrees to the acceptance of vampires, to where Mina gave a cure to his grandson that works on people that have been bitten within 48 hours. In the anime, he is much higher rank, being the prime minister, but is still the one that Mina has to deal with over the Bund.

Josée Reiko Gotoh (後藤・ジョゼ・玲子, Gotō Joze Reiko)
The stepsister of Nicole Edelman. Yet they look so much alike that Vera nearly attacked her when she introduced herself. She is a Councilor who works for Shoichi. She hadn't seen her stepsister in years, and claims to not know why she did the things she did. It is later revealed that she is dating Seiji Hama and deeply loves him. Seven years later, its revealed they've had a daughter, whom Josee mostly raises herself, who was named Nikky in honor of her aunt.

== Antagonists ==
Nicole Edelman (ニコル・エデルマン, Nikoru Ederuman)
Voiced by: Ayaka Kodama (Japanese); Clarine Harp (English)
A human reporter who became a vampire so to assassinate Mina during the news conference. She became a suicide bomb by surgically placing C4 inside her own stomach. Her plan was stopped by Akira and Vera driving stake through her heart and Akira throwing the bomb down the elevator shaft (though this accidentally caused damage to the underground settlement Mina was having constructed). She worked for Telomere.

Jean Marais Dermailles (ジャン・マレイ・デルマイユ, Jan Marei Derumaiyu)
Voiced by: Ken Narita (Japanese); Jerry Jewell (English)
Heir to Juneau and behind the attacks on the school turning the students into vampires, including Nanami and Hikosaka. He changed as many people as he could to vampires as a way in serving Mina, believing he was making an army to create a new world for Vampires. He shows no respect to his father, believing he is a person of the past. He also shows a racist hatred to Werewolves, wishing to have them exterminated in the new vampire world ruled by the "young". Mina kills him, seeing his new world idea as just a grand delusion, but before that learned of the Terrorist Organization Telomere was behind her assassination attempt. In the anime, it was Akira who killed him, and Mina already knew of Telomere before she confronted him.

Hysterica (ヒステリカ, Hisuterika)
Voiced by: Rie Kugimiya (Japanese); Kelly McHalen (English)
Her real name is Francesca and knew Vera nearly 100 years ago. Vera herself, who was known as Veratos at the time, had turned her into a vampire. She turned Hysterica into a vampire when her family was killed by the Spanish flu and that she was on the very brink of death because of it. She now works for the "Third Kind", a group that wishes for the death of Mina, and was also controlling Nanami. Hysterica led suicidal Vampires by implanting a liquid container in them, and when a phone signal was sent it would mix with their blood, causing a violent chemical reaction turning them into Vampire Bombs, one of them being Hikosaka. However, after seeing Mina's other form, got herself distracted by trying to contact her master in telling him what she just saw, therefore not realizing that Nanami was reprogrammed and was attacked by her. Vera was the one who finished Hysterica off by throwing a container of the chemical at the open wound, burning her alive. Hysterica had a habit of referring to her slaves as "Pigs." In the anime, she worked for Telomere, but still tried to contact the three clans before with news of Mina's true form.

=== Assassins ===
At a time the Three Vampire Lords were considering who got to mate with Mina, since she must mate with one of them to create a pure blood Vampire, being the only pure blood female vampire left, as well as she can only give birth once in her life. The Lords came up with a game where each one summoned their best assassin and whose ever killed Akira would be who she had to marry.

In the anime there are many differences, most likely due to the shorten time frame, where the assassins were killed off relatively quick and the Chinese assassin being only one person instead of two.

- Ivanovic's assassin in both the anime and manga is a female (later revealed to be male) shapeshifting mutant. This assassin attacks Akira with the resulting fight rendering the shapeshifter naked. She tries to interrogate Akira about Mina's true form, using the appearance of female people close to him. Akira transforms into a werewolf while she is in the form of Mina and bites her head off. In the manga, she is the first killed. In the anime, she is the second killed.
- Li's assassin(s) are twin brothers who can feel each other's pain and switch places during fighting. One of the brothers is killed by Seiji Hama, and the other by Akira. In the manga, both brothers have a true form of a bat-like humanoid with claws. In the anime there is only one assassin who has a baboon true form, and is quickly the first killed by Mei Ren.
- Rozenmann's assassin is Seiji Hama, a Werecat. He was originally in charge of the soldiers that attacked Mina in the first chapter, and was abandoned for failure. Given a second chance, and a power-suit he actually helped Akira with a shotgun against the "Corsican Brothers" while claiming to be a police officer. He managed to kill one of the Brothers in his werecat form before a final fight. He survived his fight and aided Akira later in the series. He is absent from the anime, but his role as an assassin is replaced by the anime-only character Mei Ren.

=== Telomere ===
Telomere is a mysterious terrorist organization that is behind the attacks on The Bund.

Katie Maurice
A female vampire who posed as Mina Țepeș after Ivanovic's invasion. Having no real name, she asked Yuki for one; being called "Fake princess" was too odd. She succeeds in usurping the vampire throne, but Mina soon reclaims her throne back. Yuki reveals that the fake Mina was actually looking for the Necropolis under the Fuji mountain. It looked that the fake was about to find the "Elixir of life" inside, but the bowl she found was empty.

As of Age of the Scarlet Order, Katie is attempting world domination to stop the Vampire God from devouring all life.

Tatiana
Tatiana is the only known female werewolf.

=== Anime-only antagonists ===
Seiichi Hirai (平井 星一, Hirai Seiichi)
Voiced by: Isshin Chiba (Japanese); Paul Stevenz (English)
An anime-only character. Seiichi Hirai is a vampire movie actor who wore a prosthetic right arm after he had lost his right arm. During a discussion show, he was identified by Veratos to be a vampire which caused him to claim the preserved arm and suck Yuki's blood. Seiichi then transforms into a Vampire Chameleon monster and goes on a rampage where he heads up to the top of the TV studio. Mina confronted him at the top of the TV studio revealing herself to be a vampire and mesmerized him to commit suicide by stabbing himself. Seiichi did that and soon fell off the roof of the TV studio.

Tsuchigumo (土蜘蛛)
An anime-only character. Tsuchigumo is a vampire that attempted to kill Mina. His true form is a giant Vampire Spider. Tsuchigumo was quickly killed off by Akira after he remembered he was a werewolf.

Takashi Saijō (西条 崇, Saijō Takashi)
Voiced by: Kazuya Ichijō (Japanese); Robert Howard (English)
An anime-exclusive character. He is the member of the Student Council at the school where Mina, Akira, and Yuki attend. Saijo is an ally of Jean, being the only human in their little group. Attempting to help. Jean kill Mina, Saijo is punched by Akira into a cross; he is not seen again in the anime, suggesting he is either hospitalized or died from the impact, as the punch was strong enough to break the cross when Saijo's body hit it.

Mei Ren (メイレン, Meiren)
Voiced by: Yū Kobayashi (Japanese); Cherami Leigh (English)
A werecat girl who is always seen eating hard candies, along with an audible biting sound where one is usually supposed to suck on such candy. She can also use said hard candies as a weapon, flicking them as if they were bullets with her super strength. She possesses similar abilities to werewolves while in her werecat form. She also seems to have feelings for Akira. What she is up to is currently shrouded in mystery, but has helped Akira a number of times. She carries a replica pendant reminding her of a precious friend of hers which Akira recalls in his memories. So far it appears she is loyal to Mina, and it even appears she got her on the hard candies. However this is revealed in the last episode to be not true, and is a follower of a Mina look-a-like who is the leader of Telomere. She claims her measurements are 32-23-33 and that she is a virgin. She replaces Seiji Hama in his role as one of the three assassins; this is due to her ability with the shotgun, which is similar in technique to that of Seiji Hama. Her choice of the type of shotgun is also similar. She is killed by Akira in their final fight, but dies happily as she never thought she would be able to die while in someone's arms after being alone for so long.
