= My Neighbor Seki =

Japanese manga series

- Cover of My Neighbor Seki volume 1, published by Media Factory, featuring main characters Rumi Yokoi (left) and Toshinari Seki (right)

となりの関くん (Tonari no Seki-kun)
- Genre: Comedy; Slice of life
- Manga
- Written by: Takuma Morishige
- Published by: Media Factory
- English publisher: NA: Vertical
- Magazine: Comic Flapper
- Original run: November 2010 – present
- Volumes: 10
- Original animation DVD
- Directed by: Yūji Mutoh
- Studio: Shin-Ei Animation
- Released: January 4, 2014
- Anime television series

Tonari no Seki-kun: The Master of Killing Time
- Directed by: Yūji Mutoh
- Produced by: Motomichi Araki; Yoshikazu Beniya; Mika Shimizu; Shigehiko Yamada; Tsutomu Yanagimura; Keigo Tanabe
- Music by: Akifumi Tada
- Studio: Shin-Ei Animation
- Licensed by: NA: Sentai Filmworks
- Original network: TV Tokyo, AT-X
- Original run: January 5, 2014 – May 25, 2014
- Episodes: 21
- Television drama
- Original network: MBS, TBS
- Original run: July 27, 2015 – September 14, 2015
- Episodes: 8
- Manga

My Neighbor Seki-kun Junior
- Written by: Takuma Morishige
- Published by: Media Factory
- Magazine: Comic Flapper
- Original run: July 4, 2020 – May 2, 2023
- Volumes: 3

My Neighbor Seki (となりの関くん, Tonari no Seki-kun) is a Japanese manga written and illustrated by Takuma Morishige. Originally published as a one-shot in 2010, it started serialization in the November 2010 issue of Media Factory's Comic Flapper magazine. Vertical publishes the manga in North America. An original video animation by Shin-Ei Animation was released bundled with the limited edition of the manga's fifth volume on January 4, 2014, and a 21-episode anime adaptation aired in Japan between January and May 2014. A spin-off manga serialized from July 2020 to May 2023.

== Synopsis ==
The series follows a girl named Rumi Yokoi who is constantly distracted by her neighboring classmate, Toshinari Seki, as he indulges in elaborate hobbies and somehow never gets caught in the process.

== Characters ==
Rumi Yokoi (横井 るみ, Yokoi Rumi)
Voiced by: Kana Hanazawa (Japanese); Monica Rial (English), Fumika Shimizu (live-action)
Rumi is the viewpoint character and narrator of Seki's games. She continuously attempts to pay attention in class but is almost always distracted by her neighbor's antics. She sometimes tries to make Seki concentrate on class by sabotaging his projects, but usually finds herself joining in on them, though Seki misunderstands these attempts. Some episodes feature Rumi getting just as, if not more so, involved than Seki in his games, such as when he spends a day knitting or whenever he brings the Robot Family into school. In My Neighbour Seki-kun Junior, she marries Seki and they have a two-year-old son named Makuru.
Toshinari Seki (関 俊成, Seki Toshinari)
Voiced by: Hiro Shimono (Japanese); Blake Shepard (English), Yutaro Watanabe (live-action)
Normally referred to by his surname, Seki is Rumi's classmate, and is a cheerful but mysterious character who is always playing games at his desk, which at times, include some elaborate setups. His activity bothers Rumi to no end, although he is almost never caught in the act by the teachers. In his desk is a complex array of objects that, if disturbed by anyone but himself, are impossible to put back together.^{[ch. 9]} He rarely speaks, but is sometimes seen chatting with his friends. Despite his normal demeanor around his fellow students outside of the classroom, he is occasionally shown to have a dark and sadistic side. This comes through his destruction, sometimes wantonly, of his games and toys. He is also slightly superstitious, as is shown when some of his projects become so intense for Rumi that she secretly gets involved, scaring Seki out of his wits and his flippant behavior towards education. In My Neighbour Seki Junior, he marries Yokoi and have Makuru as their son.

=== Supporting characters ===
- Sakurako Gotō (後藤 桜子, Gotō Sakurako) is a girl who sits near Rumi and Seki during art class and becomes the former's friend. She assumes Seki and Rumi are lovers because of the way they interact in class. Regardless of any relationship Rumi and Seki may actually have or not have in the present or future, almost everything she assumes is entirely based on her own imagination.^{[ch. 22]} Voiced by: Satomi Satō (Japanese); Caitlynn French (English). Portrayed by Rika Mayama in the live-action drama.
- Tomoka Hashino (橋野 友香, Hashino Tomoka) is Rumi's classmate with glasses. Voiced by: Kokoro Kikuchi (Japanese); Jad Saxton (English)
- Akiyasu Uzawa (宇沢 明康, Uzawa Akiyasu) is a laid-back classmate who is easily bored and often gets in the way of Seki's activities.^{[ch. 36]} Voiced by: Minoru Shiraishi (Japanese); Corey Hartzog (English)
- Takahiro Maeda (前田 高広, Maeda Takahiro) is a male student who sits directly in front of Seki. Due to his height and large build, he blocks the teachers from noticing Seki's activities.^{[ch. 20]} Voiced by: Shigeyuki Susaki
- Yū Nakama (仲間 由宇, Nakama Yū) is Rumi's classmate and friend. Voiced by: Mami Shitara (Japanese); Carolyn Medrano (English)

== Media ==
=== Manga ===
Written and illustrated by Takuma Morishige, the manga began as a one-shot published in the August 2010 issue of Media Factory's Comic Flapper magazine, and later started serialization in the magazine's November 2010 issue. The first tankōbon volume was published on April 23, 2011 and the tenth was released in March 2017. Vertical licensed the manga for North American publication under the title My Neighbor Seki, and has been releasing volumes since January 2015.

A spin-off series titled My Neighbor Seki-kun Junior launched in the July 4, 2020, issue of Monthly Comic Flapper. The spin-off ended in the May 2, 2023, issue of Monthly Comic Flapper. The spin-off's chapters were collected into three tankōbon volumes from June 23, 2021, to June 22, 2023.

==== Volumes ====
No.	Original release date	Original ISBN	English release date	English ISBN
1	April 23, 2011	978-4-8401-3791-1	January 13, 2015	978-1-9391-3096-9
Chapters 1–15
Rumi is concerned that Seki's domino show may cause a big explosion. Seki role-plays a soap opera plot with Shogi pieces. He polishes his desk, makes a column out of sand, makes figures out of go pieces, plays with cats, hosts a post office for passing class messages, and makes a huge rook out of chess pieces. Rumi looks inside Seki's desk but cannot fit the pieces back. Outside, Seki makes figures out of the chalk used to mark the lines on a field. He does origami and plays kokkuri-san, a Ouija board-like game. Seki later knits a cactus before pulling out toy robots and has them go through disaster preparedness drills. As the class falls asleep to a music, Seki works on a jigsaw puzzle.
2	November 22, 2011	978-4-8401-4065-2	April 14, 2015	978-1-9391-3097-6
Chapters 16–28
Seki plays Fukuwarai and shows Rumi a card trick. During lunch, he does a roleplay with octopus sausages and another shogi soap opera. The day that Maeda, the guy in front of Seki, is absent, he plays games under his desk by using his feet. The class goes on a hike but encounters Seki's old messages about a demon and a castle. When Seki plays miniature-sized golf, Gotō watches Rumi's interactions and assumes Rumi and Seki are lovers. Seki does a roleplay with Othello pieces, plays Jenga, and rolls a cube and makes stories. In swimming class, he lets his robots do a water safety roleplay. As Seki hides in a pile of leaves outside, he has a group of miniature bears scale Maeda's back.
3	July 23, 2012	978-4-8401-4701-9	July 14, 2015	978-1-9412-2048-1
Chapters 29–42
Seki excavates his desk for fossils and constructs a dinosaur. He tries out a variety of glasses, pits chess pieces against shogi pieces, and tries out palm reading. When Rumi is absent, Gotō suspects Seki misses her when he role-plays with some paper dolls. He makes a flip book and annotates it with voiceover. Outside in the snow, Seki fashions a bunny but threatens to have it sink in the ice water, but Rumi saves it. He shows a stamp seal out of an eraser, but Uzawa interferes. Seki makes a driving course with an RC car. He simulates a baseball match with magnets. Outside of class, Rumi catches Seki fabricating pictures of UFOs, and meets Seki's sister. Rumi's teacher is worried about Rumi's behavior and prepares a surprise bag inspection, but Seki uses that time to role-play with his robots. Seki has a tea ceremony as he pans for gold.
4	April 6, 2013	978-4-8401-5046-0	September 22, 2015	978-1-9412-2049-8
Chapters 43–55
Seki shows a logo and tries to brand everything in sight. He pits a rhinoceros beetle against other beetles. He plays a crane game. When Rumi, Seki, and Gotō draw each other, Gotō tries to capture Rumi's feelings while Seki plays a marble maze game. During the sports day tamaire (ball toss game), Rumi is worried about a beehive underneath the basket. Seki does some sports day events where he paints his nails (and later his hands and feet) to emulate hard conditions. Seki pits Karuta cards against Hanafuda cards in a card-fighting game. Seki decorates a Christmas tree. During a self-study period, Seki naps on a pillow but it has a picture underneath it. On kite flying day, Yokoi spots Seki's robot family doing the activity.
5	January 4, 2014	978-4-0406-6240-4	November 24, 2015	978-1-9412-2089-4
Chapters 56–68
Seki makes dango out of mud. He plays with Shogi pieces, but Uzawa interferes. He plays with a Magic Hand. He customizes a pair of jeans. Both Rumi and Seki's mother visit a lesson in class and Rumi meets Seki's mother. Seki takes care of potted plants. He uses his desk to sell various curiosities. He builds a model railroad inside his desk. He makes several clay figures. The class goes on a trip and Gotō fantasizes again about Rumi's and Seki's "relation". Seki plays with a mini pool table. He tries to fix a stubborn piece of his hair.
6	July 23, 2014	978-4-0406-6819-2	January 19, 2016	978-1-9429-9309-4
Chapters 69-81
7	April 23, 2015	978-4-0406-7515-2	March 15, 2016	978-1-9429-9310-0
Chapters 82-94
8	December 22, 2015	978-4-0406-7865-8	October 4, 2016	978-1-9429-9350-6
Chapters 95-107
9	August 23, 2016	978-4-0406-8510-6	May 9, 2017	978-1-9450-5401-3
Chapters 108-120
10	March 23, 2017	978-4-0406-9019-3	January 23, 2018	978-1-9450-5450-1
Chapters 121-129

==== My Neighbor Seki Junior ====
No.	Original release date	Original ISBN	English release date	English ISBN
1	June 23, 2021	978-4-0468-0481-5	—	—
2	June 22, 2022	978-4-0468-1569-9	—	—
3	June 22, 2023	978-4-0468-2517-9	—	—

=== Anime ===
A 21-episode anime directed by Yūji Mutoh and produced by Shin-Ei Animation, aired in Japan between January 5 and May 25, 2014, and was simulcast by Crunchyroll under the title Tonari no Seki-kun: The Master of Killing Time. The fifth manga volume was released simultaneously on January 4, 2014, with a limited edition, bundled with an original animation DVD containing two additional episodes. The series was released on DVD in two parts on May 28, 2014, with a bonus episode on each disc. The opening theme is "Meiwaku Spectacle" (迷惑スペクタクル, Meiwaku Supekutakuru; lit. 'Nuisance Spectacle') by Kana Hanazawa, and the ending theme is "Set Them Free" by Akira Jimbo. The music in the series is composed by Akifumi Tada. The drama CD for the anime was released on January 22, 2014, by King Records.

=== Live-action ===
The series was adapted into a live-action show where it was paired with another live-action adaptation titled Rumi's Phenomenon. Both programs involve a main character named Rumi. It premiered on MBS and TBS on July 27, 2015 as Tonari no Seki-kun to Rumi-chan no Jishō (となりの関くんとるみちゃんの事象; My Neighbor Seki and Rumi's Phenomenon) and ran for eight episodes. Morishige said "I feel a sense of odd destiny that the heroines' names are coincidentally the same."

== Reception ==
Over 3 million copies of the manga have been sold as of July 2014. The manga was one of the works nominated in the fifth Manga Taishō awards in 2012. My Neighbor Seki was listed on YALSA's 2016 list of Great Graphic Novels for Teens.

Rebecca Silverman of Anime News Network gave the first volume of the manga an overall grade of C+. Karen Mead of Japanator liked that the anime put the detail into Seki's projects rather than the characters, and that while the show could have worked as a three- to four-minute short, that it gets stretched to eight minutes with opening and ending themes gives it a chance to build atmosphere and tension. Richard Eisenbeis of Kotaku called it "the most basic, yet perhaps most entertaining, anime of the season."
