= Candy Boy =

Original net animation series

- Kanade (front-left), Yukino (front-right), and Sakuya (top-right)

キャンディ ボーイ (Kyandi Bōi)
- Genre: Romantic comedy, yuri
- Original net animation
- Directed by: Takafumi Hoshikawa
- Studio: AIC
- Released: November 22, 2007
- Runtime: 8 minutes
- Original net animation
- Directed by: Takafumi Hoshikawa
- Studio: AIC
- Released: May 2, 2008 – May 8, 2009
- Runtime: 12–20 minutes
- Episodes: 7 (+2 DVD Episodes)
- Manga
- Written by: Hiro Tōge
- Published by: Media Factory
- Magazine: Comic Flapper
- Original run: November 5, 2009 – October 5, 2010
- Volumes: 2
- Manga

Candy Boy ~Young girls fall in love!~
- Written by: Hiro Tōge
- Published by: Media Factory
- Magazine: Flapper Mobile
- Original run: November 2009 – December 2010

Candy☆Boy (キャンディ ボーイ, Kyandi Bōi) is an eight-minute original net animation produced by Anime International Company, and directed by Takafumi Hoshikawa. Since November 22, 2007, the ONA is available through streaming on the Cho! animelo audiovisual website and the Nico Nico Douga online video service. This was followed by a seven-episode series, with episodes being streamed between May 2, 2008, and May 8, 2009. Additional episodes were released on DVD, one with the DVD version of the single, "Bring Up Love" by Nayuta, and another released with volume 2 of the series. A spin-off manga series by Hiro Tōge was serialized in Media Factory's Comic Flapper magazine between November 2009 and December 2010, with another series, also by Tōge, distributed on mobile phones.

As a romantic school comedy setting, the story focuses on the budding romantic relationship between Kanade and Yukino Sakurai, twin sisters in their second year at an all-girls high school in Tokyo, and the conflict provided by freshman Sakuya Kamiyama's feelings towards Kanade.

== Plot ==
Yukino and Kanade Sakurai, twin sisters and natives from Hokkaido, move together to a student residence in Tokyo to attend high school leaving their younger sister, Shizuku "Shi-chan" alone with their parents. Sakuya Kamiyama, a first year student, seeks out and stalks Kanade, saying that she's in love with her and will do anything to be with her, she pays Yukino with candies in exchange of photos and personal stuff of her sister. Later, Kanade feels that the close relationship between Yukino and her is falling apart because of their lack of spending time due to her schoolwork and Yukino's part-time job.

== Characters ==
=== Main characters ===
Kanade Sakurai (櫻井 奏, Sakurai Kanade)
Voiced by: Hitomi Nabatame
The younger twin, although generally considered more mature than her sister. She is also somewhat easy to ruffle emotionally, especially by Yukino. She often worries that Yukino is sacrificing herself for her benefit. Kanade is an artist and wants to pursue art studies, however, she understands that it would be difficult to pursue a career in the field and maintain a close relationship with Yukino.
Yukino Sakurai (櫻井 雪乃, Sakurai Yukino)
Voiced by: Ryōka Yuzuki
The older twin. She likes snacks and often trades photos of Kanade to Sakuya for them. She is a member of their school's swim team and writes a daily blog about her life. She cares deeply for Kanade and will support her in any way she can.
Sakuya Kamiyama (神山 咲夜, Kamiyama Sakuya)
Voiced by: Emiri Katō
An extremely wealthy freshman who has an obsessive crush on Kanade. She is prone to stealing Kanade's things for her collection. Despite her overwhelming presence, the twins seem to like her as a friend.
Shizuku Sakurai (櫻井 雫, Sakurai Shizuku)
Voiced by: Yū Kobayashi
Kanade and Yukino's younger sister who attends middle school, nicknamed Shi-chan. She hates being apart from her sisters. She is a lot more level-headed than her older sisters. She is deeply affected by the actions of Yukino, who she seems to care about more than Kanade. Unlike her sisters, she buries all her emotions deep down without expressing them but they later resurface in various ways, such as her skipping school.

=== Manga characters ===
Characters who appear in the two different manga series for the magazine and mobile reading manga service.

Yuriko Takanashi (小鳥遊 優里好, Takanashi Yuriko)
Kanade's short-haired classmate, nicknamed Yuripe (ユリペ). Her parents own a restaurant and she is quite good at cooking. She generally tells off Kanade for her perverted thoughts about Yukino.
Isako Mikanagi (御巫 一茶子, Mikanagi Isako)
Sakuya's classmate and self-proclaimed rival in love for Kanade's affection. However, she secretly loves Sakuya, a fact which is obvious to their other classmates.
Eri Miyagi (宮城 エリ, Miyagi Eri)
Sakuya's classmate and Sakuya and Isako's friends who comes from a white collar family. She is close friends with Masumi and is more perceptive of Isako's love for Sakuya than Masumi.
Masumi Kurasuma (烏丸 眞澄, Kurasuma Masumi)
Sakuya's classmate and Sakuya and Isako's friends who helps out with sports clubs as a substitute player or practice partner, she is close friends with Eri but is not as perceptive as Eri is in reading the romantic moments Isako has for Sakuya.

== Media ==
=== Anime ===
On December 5, 2007, Candy Boy was released on DVD along with the limited edition of Korean artist Meilin's Candy Boy CD single. This is the first release from a project called Anime 2.0, in which a single is sold accompanied by an OVA.

A follow-up seven-episode series began streaming on May 2, 2008. The first DVD volume of this new series was released on December 10, 2008. A single by Nayuta called Bring up Love was released on August 13, 2008, the DVD edition of which contains the first EX episode of the series. The second DVD volume was released on June 24, 2009, containing another episode.

==== Episode list ====
No.	Title	Original release date
Prologue	"Candy☆Boy - Side Story for Archive"	November 22, 2007
When Kanade assumes Yukino is going out with Sakuya, she starts to distance herself from their usual closeness. However, Yukino gets upset and begs Kanade not to leave her. It turns out Sakuya actually had a crush on Kanade and was asking Yukino for advice.
1	"The Two's Distance"; Transliteration: "Futari no Kyori" (Japanese: フタリノキョリ)	May 2, 2008
Remembering the times when she and Yukino used to walk under an umbrella together, Kanade works out a plan to relive those moments. A rainy day comes, but Kanade is unable to find her umbrella. Luckily Yukino also remembered those days and brought her own.
2	"Can I have this, plea...se?" Transliteration: "Kore Kudasa...i?" (Japanese: コレクダサ...イ?)	June 21, 2008
In the run up to Christmas, Kanade and Yukino look for presents for each other. Meanwhile, Sakuya makes plans for the new dorms being built. Kanade finds a perfect, albeit rather expensive, gift, using their plane ticket money in the process. While wondering how to get home, Sakuya shows up with airplane tickets, including one for herself.
EX01	"Forecast of the Future"; Transliteration: "Mirai Yohouzu" (Japanese: ミライヨホウズ)	August 13, 2008
Set before the original ONA, Kanade and Yukino move into their dorm room in Tokyo, sending photos back to their sister, Shizuku.
3	"Crossing Barriers"; Transliteration: "Koerarenai Kabe" (Japanese: コエラレナイカベ)	September 26, 2008
Kanade and Yukino, along with Sakuya, arrive home where their younger sister, Shizuku, awaits them. While putting up with Sakuya, Kanade and Yukino learn that Shizuku has been jealous of the two's closeness.
4	"It's Hepatica, right..." Transliteration: "Yukiwari Soukana" (Japanese: ユキワリソウカナ...)	November 7, 2008
Kanade and Yukino have to deal with the way things have turned out, while Shizuku has a talk with Sakuya, who explains why she fell for Kanade. Shizuku then spends the night with Kanade and Yukino and apologizes.
5	"Aaaaaaah...mmm!"; Transliteration: "Aaaaa...nmu!" (Japanese: ア―――...ンムッ!)	December 29, 2008
Kanade has a weird dream involving Yukino. While worrying about her exams and homework, she gets taken out by Yukino to a cafe for Valentine's Day. However, Kanade has to redo her homework for incorporating her dreams into them.
6	"What Lies Beyond"; Transliteration: "Sono Saki ni Aru Koto" (Japanese: ソノサキニアルコト)	March 13, 2009
Kanade gets a stern lecture from her teacher concerning her recent art fumble, and Yukino warns her to be more careful. The new dorms are in preparations and Sakuya has a whole floor dedicated to her and Kanade, but then Kanade points out she already signed up to share one with Yukino and she freezes up. Kanade mentions that she might take extra classes during the Spring holidays, and has to tell Shizuku that they might not be home, which ruins plans she had. Yukino says that she'll get a part time job so Kanade can go to prep school, which stuns her a little.
7	"Cherry Blossoms have Bloomed?"; Transliteration: "Sakura Saku?" (Japanese: サクラサク?)	May 8, 2009
Kanade is feeling both guilty that Yukino is doing a part time job for her sake, and lonely since she doesn't get to spend as much time with her. They are both surprised to find Shizuku at their apartment, who stays over. Sakuya tells Kanade that she should go apologize to Yukino, with Shizuku making a similar suggestion. Kanade later meets up with Yukino to apologize, telling her she'll take a short-term course instead of full term, and they promise to stay together forever. Yukino asks Kanade to get some cream off her mouth, which, to Yukino's surprise, Kanade removes with her lips. They later say that they love each other.
EX02	"Theory of Happiness Sharing"; Transliteration: "Shiawase Kyōyū Riron" (Japanese: シアワセキョウユウリロン)	June 24, 2009
As the snow falls, Sakuya invites Yukino, Kanade and Shizuku to a swimming pool before it is opened to the public. However, Sakuya's true motive is to take photographs of Kanade for lewd purposes, going as far as to photoshop her head onto Shizuku's body while wearing her old swimsuit. Yukino calls Kanade's bluff on her spotting her in her swimsuit, and they offer a compromise. Kanade decides to delete all of Sakuya's photos, but Shizuku decides to give her one as thanks for inviting her.

=== Music ===
- "Candy☆Boy" (Original ONA)
  - Lyricist: CHIHIRO
  - Composer: CHIHIRO
  - Arranger: Kono Keiuge
  - Song: MEILIN
- "Koi no Katachi" (ED of Episodes 1, 3, EX01, EX02; Episode 2 Interlude)
  - Lyricist: Toshiro Yabuki
  - Composer: Toshiro Yabuki
  - Arranger: Toshiro Yabuki
  - Song: KΛNΛ
- "Bring up...LOVE" (Episode 4, 5, 6 ED)
  - Lyricist: Toshiro Yabuki
  - Composer: Toshiro Yabuki
  - Arranger: Toshiro Yabuki
  - Song: NAYUTA
- "ROMANCE" (Episode 7 ED)
  - Lyricist: Toshiro Yabuki
  - Composer: Toshiro Yabuki
  - Arranger: Toshiro Yabuki
  - Song: Sakurai Sisters (Hitomi Tenme and Ryoka Yuzuki)
- Additional background music was also used from the Nash Music Library

=== Manga ===
A manga adaptation of the series by Hiro Tōge began serialization in the seinen manga magazine Comic Flapper on November 5, 2009. A spin-off manga also by Tōge, titled Candy Boy 〜Young girls fall in love!〜, follows the lives of Sakuya and her classmates behind the scenes of the main story, was distributed on Flapper Mobile alongside the main story release. Both series were compiled into two tankōbon volumes, released on June 23, 2010, and December 22, 2010, respectively.
