= Kamisama Kazoku =

Japanese light novel series

- Cover of Kamisama Kazoku volume 1 as published by Media Factory

神様家族 (God Family)
- Genre: Romantic comedy
- Light novel
- Written by: Yoshikazu Kuwashima
- Illustrated by: Suzuhito Yasuda
- Published by: Media Factory
- Imprint: MF Bunko J
- Original run: June 25, 2003 – January 25, 2008
- Volumes: 8 + 1 short story collection
- Manga
- Written by: Yoshikazu Kuwashima
- Illustrated by: TaPari
- Published by: Media Factory
- English publisher: NA: Go! Comi
- Magazine: Comic Flapper
- Original run: December 2005 – May 23. 2008
- Volumes: 5
- Anime television series
- Directed by: Kimitoshi Chioka
- Studio: Toei Animation
- Original network: Animax
- Original run: May 18, 2006 – August 10, 2006
- Episodes: 13

Kamisama Kazoku (Japanese: 神様家族; "God Family") is a series of light novels written by Yoshikazu Kuwashima and illustrated by Suzuhito Yasuda. It is first serialized by Media Factory on June 25, 2003, and concluded on April 25, 2006, with eight volumes; a short story collection titled Kamisama Kazoku Z (神様家族Z) was released on January 25, 2008. An anime adaptation by Toei Animation premiered on May 18, 2006, in Japan across the anime satellite television network Animax.

== Plot ==
Samatarou Kamiyama is the son of a god and must live in the human world with his family to learn about them, in order to become a better god when the time comes to succeed his father. His closest friend is Tenko, Samatarou's guardian angel since birth. One day he falls for Kumiko Komori, a girl who just transferred to their school, and decides to win her heart without relying on any of his relatives' godly powers, oblivious to the fact that Tenko herself has a crush on him.

== Characters ==
Samatarou Kamiyama (神山 佐間太郎, Kamiyama Samatarō)
Voiced by: Daisuke Kishio
Samatarou is the blue-eyed, blue-haired son of a god (kami) and a goddess (megami), who is studying humanity on Earth in order to be a better deity when he is ready to succeed his father. Samatarou is not human, evidenced by the fact that he mentions never having felt really hungry and by Tenko's comment that he should not be too strongly affected by pain when she punches him. Samatarou does not seem to have full control of his powers yet, although he is capable of communicating in telepathic/chibi form and he displays other abilities infrequently. Samatarou is generally kind-hearted, considerate to people and capable of acts of courage and determination, but he is easily embarrassed by his family's madcap antics and he is easily bribed with yakisoba bread. Before his crush on Kumiko, he seemed to be generally fed up with his life, where he got everything he wanted just by wishing it, and was lacking in resolve. Samataro's name spells out God which is Kamisama (Kami comes from Kamiyama (lit. God mount) and Sama comes from Samataro)
In Kamisama Kazoku Z, he becomes a "god", but according to his words, seems like it is only "an increase in duties".
Tenko Kamiyama (神山 テンコ)
Voiced by: Ami Koshimizu
Tenko is a pink-haired, pink-eyed angel that was summoned to Earth on the very day that Samatarou was born, to be his guardian and guide until he was ready to move ahead by himself. Since Tenko appeared in the form of a newborn, she has grown up with Samatarou and developed feelings for him along the way. This did not stop her from acting as Samatarou's conscience and occasionally punishing him for what she considered to be his misdeeds. Tenko tries to help her charge with his first crush, only to suffer conflicting feelings when she realizes her own feelings. Despite having considerable willpower and integrity, Tenko is in some ways as innocent as a child and lacks some knowledge of general human traffic. For instance, she was quite unknowing about the method of conceiving children and operated by the same explanation that Meme got; first boy and girl kiss, then the stork comes. A defining trait of Tenko is that, whenever she suffers an emotional extreme of some sort, steam visibly erupts from the top of her head. Tenko's name is a variation of Tenshi which means Angel.
In Kamisama Kazoku Z, she becomes an "archangel", but does not gain any flight abilities or so, and nothing really changes from the original series.
Kumiko Komori (小森 久美子, Komori Kumiko)
Voiced by: Ai Maeda
Black-haired, dark-eyed, slender and pretty Kumiko Komori temporarily transfers into the same school as Samatarou and Tenko and becomes Samatarou's first crush. After becoming the victim of some emotion-influencing by Misa and Meme, Kumiko develops genuine feelings for Samatarou when he saves her from a nasty fall. Later, when she again transfers into the school, she tries to develop a closer relationship with Samatarou, but startling revelations are made. It turns out that Kumiko is the daughter of a female devil, who targets Samatarou and his family. Kumiko has been looking after her mother, feeding her the energy of human souls, ever since her demonic powers started manifesting in middle school without any kind of reciprocation. In the end, she tries to escape her fate as a devil and asks for Samatarou's help. After the climax of the anime, when she has regained touch with her true heritage, Kumiko changes back into an angel like Tenko.
In Kamisama Kazoku Z, she becomes "Kumiko Oomori" (大森 久美子, Oomori Kumiko). This came from the simple idea that putting the letter "大" (Large) would make one splendid.
Osamu Kamiyama (神山 治, Kamiyama Osamu)
Voiced by: Masashi Ebara
Osamu is the father of Misa, Samatarou and Meme and husband to Venus. Osamu appears as an older man, who acts playful and appears to be a loving husband and father, albeit a somewhat odd one. When in his workplace in the heavens, Osamu's main occupation appears to be the granting of human wishes. Before Samatarou started showing his own initiative to get what he wanted, Osamu frequently spoiled his son and heir, granting his every desire instantly, even if Samatarou did not particularly want him to. Because Osamu tends to go overboard when granting his son's wishes, he frequently embarrassed his child. Since Samatarou started moving forward by himself, Osamu has stayed in his workplace, doing his own job. He does not object to visits from his family, however.
In Kamisama Kazoku Z, he becomes the "High god" (大神様, Ōgamisama) but without his daily duties gone, he has become even more disengaged.
Venus Kamiyama (神山 ビーナス, Kamiyama Bīnasu)
Voiced by: Nanaho Katsuragi
Venus is the mother of Misa, Samatarou and Meme and wife to Osamu. The goddess of love appears as a beautiful woman, who does not quite act her age and loves playing around with her children and husband. She manages to frequently embarrass her son Samatarou when doing so, since she tends to engage in cosplay and has made it clear that she'd engage in casual nudity as well, if Samatarou were not so dead-set against the idea. Venus seems to have a slight complex about her age and appearance, as she can go ballistic when being addressed as 'old lady' or 'grandmother' and is easily distracted from the topic if she becomes suddenly worried about her age and looks. Additionally, Venus has displayed great jealousy whenever it seems like a girl might be stealing 'her Samatarou-chan' away from her, even when that someone might be Tenko. Despite her sillier traits, Venus displays considerable flexibility, compassion and wisdom when the need arises. When she was temporarily human, her personality was completely opposite, now cold and distant from her children.
In Kamisama Kazoku Z, she becomes the "High goddess" (大女神様, Ōmegamisama) but there are no changes from the original series.
Misa Kamiyama (神山美佐, Kamiyama Misa)
Voiced by: Yumi Touma
Misa is the oldest (known) child of Osamu and Venus, older sister to Samatarou and Meme. Misa is a candidate for goddess status who already controls most of her powers; one of her specialties is influencing people's emotions so they'll do whatever Misa wants. When outside her family home, Misa projects the image of a sweet, demure girl and has gained quite a following. This is despite the fact that she apparently considers men 'scum', as she feels they all think exactly the same way. At home, she tends to lounge around in her underwear and enjoys teasing her little brother and Tenko. She frequently goes along with Venus' and Osamu's antics, apparently just to get a laugh at Samatarou's expense, but is unaffected by her parents' antics herself, apparently possessing ample willpower. Misa is quite perceptive and not without compassion; when the need arises, she will assist.
During her brief stint as a human, Misa was much more shy than she is as a megami candidate and actually had a boyfriend. In her true form, she does not seem to have any steady relationship.
In Kamisama Kazoku Z, she becomes a "goddess" but there are no changes to her, such as her character etc.
Meme Kamiyama (神山メメ, Kamiyama Meme)
Voiced by: Akemi Kanda
Meme is the youngest child of Osamu and Venus, younger sister to Misa and Samatarou. Meme is a candidate for goddess status and controls some of her powers, despite her young age; like her sister Misa, she is quite skilled at controlling people's emotions. Meme usually appears emotionless and acts quite mature for her age, but she is a child. Her lack of experience can cause her to join in with the mad antics of her older relatives, possibly because she has no reason to think what they're doing is in any way unreasonable.
During her brief stint as a human, Meme was a much more outwardly cheerful child, but appeared to be rather scatterbrained; she managed to put the wrong shoes on her foot without noticing anything was wrong.
In Kamisama Kazoku Z, she becomes a "goddess" but there are no visible changes to her.
Shinichi Kirishima (霧島進一, Kirishima Shin'ichi)
Voiced by: Hiroaki Miura
Shinichi is Samatarou's and Tenko's friend at school. He's quite girl-crazy and frequently peppers his speech with English phrases when he becomes excited - which he often does, especially when talking about girls. His friends consider him something of an idiot, sadly not without reason, but he seems to be essentially good-natured. Eventually, Shinichi manages to develop a romantic relationship with Ai Tachibana, much to the horror of Samatarou and Tenko. Despite their feeling of foreboding and Ai's occasional displeasure, Shinichi is apparently true to the relationship.
In Kamisama Kazoku Z, he appears as an adult. Married with Ai, he has a daughter named "Lulu" (ルル). He comes to the classroom in which Ai teaches just for reasons such as Lulu is not hiccuping etc, and Samatarou thinks that 'he has become even worse than before".
Fumiko Komori (小森フミコ, Komori Fumiko)
Voiced by: Mariko Kouda
A female devil, the mother of Kumiko. Very sadistic and evil, Fumiko deceives her only child into thinking that her youth and power were draining away and that she needed the energy of human souls to sustain herself, all in an effort to turn her daughter into a true devil at heart. She shows no compassion nor care for her own child and initially sends her to capture Samatarou, so she might dine on his vast energy. At the end of the anime series, it is revealed that Fumiko was once an angel who fell in love with a mortal man and conceived Kumiko with him. The mortal left them both when he saw Kumiko's angelic heritage and Fumiko's heart was broken and turned into a devil.
Suguru (スグル)
Voiced by: Yasuhiro Takato
Suguru claims to be an archangel. He makes contact with Tenko when he believes Samatarou is capable of moving on without his guardian from now on and comes to Earth himself when Tenko asks for a three-day grace period, just to spend some more time with Samatarou. Suguru appears as a piggy bank, which can fly and tells how much money it contains and receives, according to him because he did not want to draw attention to himself. He seems to resent being addressed as 'pig', claiming to be a most splendid archangel. His claims do nothing to prevent Tenko from smacking him around a couple of times. It is suggested at the end of the anime that Suguru is actually Tenko's father, but he has apparently chosen not to reveal this to her—yet.
In Kamisama Kazoku Z, he becomes the "High archangel (大大天使, Dai-dai-tenshi)". However for bragging about himself being higher than Papa (Osamu) for having two letter '大 (Large)'s, gets placed on top of the TV.

== Media ==
=== Manga ===
A manga adaptation was serialized in Comic Flapper and illustrated by Tapari. Go! Comi announced that it has licensed the manga series during Anime Expo 2007.

=== Anime ===
In 2006, Kamisama Kazoku was adapted into a 13-episode anime television series which began airing on Animax from May 18, 2006, to August 10, 2006. Two pieces of theme music were used through the series, "Brand New Morning" by Mai Mizuhashi for the opening theme and "Toshokan de wa Oshiete Kurenai, Tenshi no Himitsu" (図書館では教えてくれない、天使の秘密) by Miraku (Mai Mizuhashi, Mayu Kudō, and Fumika Iwaki) for the closing theme.

No.	Title	Original air date
1	"Do you Believe in God?"; Transliteration: "Kamisama Shinjimasuka?" (Japanese: 神様信じますか?)	May 18, 2006
The first episode describes Samatarou and Tenko's daily life, and how they and Kumiko met.
2	"Samatarou's Violent, Epic First Love Battle"; Transliteration: "Samatarō Hatsukoi Mōretsu Daisakusen" (Japanese: 佐間太郎初恋モーレツ大作戦)	May 25, 2006
Samatarou decides to win Kumiko's heart by his own effort, and asks for Tenko's assistance.
3	"Trembling Heart's Roulette"; Transliteration: "Yureru Kokoro no Rūretto" (Japanese: 揺れる心のルーレット)	June 1, 2006
Samatarou gets another chance to get along with Kumiko, but faces more trouble when Meme creates a device to control her emotions.
4	"Tenko's Tears - Upon Her Glittering Wings..."; Transliteration: "Tenko no Namida - Kagayaku Tsubasa no Saki ni" (Japanese: 天使の涙 輝く翼の先に...)	June 8, 2006
Tired of their interference, Samatarou convinces his family to transform him into a human, but he was unaware of the consequences of this request.
5	"The Season of Love? Interested in Him?"; Transliteration: "Koi no Kisetsu? Ki ni naru Aitsu?" (Japanese: 恋の季節?!気になるアイツ?)	June 15, 2006
Shinichi is in awe as he believes he found the girl of his dreams, but Samatarou has a feeling that he knows her from somewhere. Meanwhile, Tenko is behaving strangely.
6	"Tenko's Baby"; Transliteration: "Tenko no Akachan" (Japanese: テンコの赤ちゃん)	June 22, 2006
A mysterious baby appears before Tenko and Samatarou, and the duo decide to take care of her. Meanwhile, Shinichi is having trouble with his crush.
7	"Growing Girl"; Transliteration: "Hatsuiku Shōjo" (Japanese: 発育少女)	June 29, 2006
Ai continues to grow faster and faster, and unwillingly creating much trouble for Samatarou and Tenko.
8	"Important Friend"; Transliteration: "Taisetsu na Otomodachi" (Japanese: たいせつなおともだち)	July 6, 2006
After finally solving the mystery involving Ai and the wheelchaired girl, things start to heat up between Samatarou and Tenko. Osamu sends Samatarou back in time since he reveals him as God to a human.
9	"First Love Once More..."; Transliteration: "Hatsukoi Matatabi..." (Japanese: 初恋 再び...)	July 13, 2006
Tenko receives an order to return to heaven as her duties with Samatarou are completed, but she refuses to do so. Just when Samatarou and Tenko are trying to sort out their feelings for each other, Kumiko returns.
10	"Pink Savings in a Teary Heart?!"; Transliteration: "Namida no Hāto de Momoiro Chokin?!" (Japanese: 涙のハートで桃色貯金?!)	July 20, 2006
Suguru, an Archangel, descends to Earth and accepts Tenko's request to wait three days before she returns to heaven with him. Meanwhile, Kumiko introduces Samatarou to her mother.
11	"Midnight Girl"; Transliteration: "Mayonaka no Shōjo" (Japanese: 真夜中の少女)	July 27, 2006
Tenko decides to investigate about Kumiko's life and discovers the truth about her.
12	"Kiss"; Transliteration: "Kisu" (Japanese: キス)	August 3, 2006
Samatarou finally realizes his feelings for Tenko and breaks up with Kumiko. Kumiko however, tells him all the truth just before the real enemy reveals herself.
13	"The Bonds That Connect Angels' Prayers"; Transliteration: "Tenshi no Inori Tsunagaru Kizuna" (Japanese: 天使の祈りつながる 絆)	August 10, 2006
One by one the members of the Kamiyama family fall before Fumiko's power. Samatarou must find a way to fight her, being careful to not surrender himself to wrath and become a demon himself. He then defeats Fumiko by killing the demon inside him. Tenko and Kumiko save him and Kumiko turns into an angel. At the end Tenko and Samatarou kiss and they all take a photo together.

== Reception ==
Carlo Santos of Anime News Network gave the manga series positive reviews stating that dialog was "pretty light and easygoing" but that the English translation "occasionally ends up with strange word choices and awkward turns of phrase".
