= Translucent (manga) =

Japanese manga series

- The cover of the first volume of Translucent

トランスルーセント―彼女は半透明 (Toransurūsento: Kanojo wa Hantōmei)
- Manga
- Written by: Kazuhiro Okamoto
- Published by: Media Factory
- Magazine: Comic Flapper
- Original run: 2003 – 2005
- Volumes: 5

Translucent (トランスルーセント―彼女は半透明, Toransurūsento: Kanojo wa Hantōmei; "Translucent: She is Translucent") is a Japanese seinen manga series written by Kazuhiro Okamoto and serialized in Comic Flapper. It was licensed by Dark Horse Comics for English language release in the North America in July 2007.

== Synopsis ==
The protagonist of the series is a shy young girl named Shizuka and her outgoing male friend Mamoru. The series revolves around Shizuka's high school life after she contracts "Translucent Syndrome", a mysterious condition which has only one symptom: The victim's body randomly turns translucent (and later completely invisible), but is otherwise left perfectly normal and healthy. Unfortunately for Shizuka, there is no known cure or treatment for Translucent Syndrome, other than it is tied to the emotional state of the person affected; positive emotions like happiness and love cause it to retract, negative emotions like stress and sadness cause it to accelerate.

Initially Shizuka's condition only affects her arms and legs, and only partially, at seemingly randomly times and durations. However, as it worsens it begins to affect her entire body, leaving her increasingly more translucent and for increasingly longer random periods of time. Shizuka is also in danger of gaining "Fully Transparent Syndrome", or otherwise having her translucency become permanent, which will occur if she spends too long a stretch in her translucent stage. Fully Transparent Syndrome is marked by complete and permanent invisibility, rather than the temporary partial invisibility of the normal syndrome.

The fictional condition is used in the series as a metaphor for the common childhood anxiety of feeling lonely and disconnected from other people, as well as—through the threat of the condition worsening—a fear of growing up.

== Characters ==
Shizuka Shiroyama (Shiroyama Shizuka)

The shy 14-year-old main character of the manga. Shizuka contracted the strange "Translucent Syndrome" 3 years before the manga started, which cuts her off from both normal social interaction with her peers, and from her dreams of becoming a stage actress. Shizuka is very talented for a young actress, but this is offset by her very timid and insecure nature. She has decided that she wishes to be a "cherry tree actress" -- one that is mostly ignored unless she is on stage, where she will blossom like a cherry tree.

Mamoru Tadami (Tadami Mamoru)

Mamoru is an outgoing, childish extrovert, who encourages Shizuka to come out of her shell, despite (or because of) her condition. He is a painter, and assists Shizuka in creating better skin tone greasepaint tones to hide her condition when it is minor. He is obsessed with monsters as well as Gundam models. He also likes to create silly games, like walking in lockstep with Shizuka spontaneously, seeing "old men" in housing architecture, or monsters in cloud formations. Seems to have feelings for Shizuka, but is too immature to articulate them.

Keiko Haruna (Haruna Keiko)

An adult friend of Shizuka, whom Shizuka meets during a checkup for her Translucent Syndrome. Keiko's Translucent Syndrome has progressed to the permanent "Fully Transparent Syndrome" stage, and as such she is completely invisible. She is not drawn at all in most of the manga, instead her trademark glasses, cigarette, and bandanna float in midair. In a small bit of irony, Keiko is a professional glass artist, and comments on Glass's translucency when she is introduced. She also has a boyfriend named Koichi.

Koichi (No last name given)

Keiko's on-again/off-again boyfriend. He is an architect, and is fascinated by old buildings. He is also an old fan of Gundam models. He is very similar in personality to Mamoru, only older.

Okouchi (Okōchi) (No first name given)

The student body president of Shizuka and Mamoru's school, and a friend of Shizuka's. Ms. Okouchi dislikes the constant attention her family and peers give her, and is jealous of Shizuka's condition. She attempts to get Translucent Syndrome from Shizuka, but cannot due to Translucent Syndrome being non-contagious. Later, she attempts to further Mamoru and Shizuka's relationship, growing increasingly frustrated (up to and including drop kicking, which she starts to do as a running gag) with Mamoru's obliviousness. She also seems to have a slight crush on Mamoru herself.

Dr. Momoko Takazawa

The world's foremost expert in Translucent Syndrome, and Shizuka's doctor. Dr. Takazawa is a young woman who takes an interest in furthering Shizuka and Mamoru's relationship. She enjoys teasing Shizuka with more than slight sexual innuendo, for example asking her if Shizuka and Mamoru have had sex, and insinuating that Shizuka is perfectly healthy, except for her breast size. However, her intentions appear to be noble, as she recognizes that Mamoru is having a healthy effect on Shizuka's Translucent Syndrome, primarily her emotional state.

== US Localization Delay ==
In a post on the Dark Horse Forums, Philip Simon, the editor behind the US translation of Translucent announced an ETA of Translucent, Books 4 and 5—Vol. 4 on sale July 2009, and Vol. 5 (the final volume) on sale November 2009. Anticipating a reaction due to the extreme delay (Volume 4 will be translated 11 months after said forum post, and just over 18 months after Volume 3's release), he said ""Why the wait with some of these?" you may ask. Well, I had to find new translators after three great teammates had to bow out of their projects. Tried out several possibilities, found two amazing new translators, and now we're on our way to finishing these series off!"

A later reply notified readers that the translation is on hiatus, with Mr. Simon expressing a desire to get the series back into production at some later date.
