= Brave 10 =

Japanese manga series

- Cover of the first volume
- Genre: Action
- Manga
- Written by: Kairi Shimotsuki
- Published by: Media Factory
- Magazine: Comic Flapper
- Original run: October 5, 2006 – December 4, 2010
- Volumes: 8
- Manga

Brave 10 S
- Written by: Kairi Shimotsuki
- Published by: Media Factory
- Magazine: Monthly Comic Gene
- Original run: June 15, 2011 – March 2016
- Volumes: 9
- Anime television series
- Directed by: Kiyoko Sayama
- Produced by: Hideaki Miyamoto; Sachi Kawamoto; Norikatsu Umeda
- Written by: Mamiko Ikeda
- Music by: Seikō Nagaoka
- Studio: Studio Sakimakura (animation); TMS Entertainment (production)
- Licensed by: NA: NIS America (former) Discotek Media (current)
- Original network: Tokyo MX
- Original run: January 8, 2012 – March 27, 2012
- Episodes: 12
- icon

BRAVE10 is a manga series by Kairi Shimotsuki, serialized in Media Factory's Comic Flapper from 2006 to 2010. The series was resumed on June 15, 2011, and retitled Brave 10 Spiral, better known as Brave 10 S, serialized in Monthly Comic Gene. An anime adaptation by Studio Sakimakura and TMS Entertainment aired from January 2012 to March 2012. The original manga series is licensed by Tokyopop, though no volumes have been released as of 2012. The series is based on the legendary Sanada Ten Braves, a group of ninja that assisted warlord Sanada Yukimura during the Sengoku period of Japan. The series had been licensed for streaming on Crunchyroll.

== Characters ==
Saizō Kirigakure (霧隠 才蔵, Kirigakure Saizō)
Voiced by: Daisuke Ono

A ninja originally from Iga. His weapon allows him to use "senkou" (flash) that enables him to accelerate. He was rumored to be the "genius" ninja who never let a single strand of his hair to be touched. Saizo was a cold, efficient ninja who killed many people, but changed after he met Isanami, who believed in him. While spending his days with Isanami, he begins to care for her, even harboring some feelings for her. According to Yukimura, Saizo carries the element of light, which he denies because he has taken so many lives.

Isanami (伊佐那海)
Voiced by: Rina Satō

A priestess Saizo saved in the woods, first seen running from an organization that was trying to kidnap her. After her home was burnt down, Isanami, the only survivor, went to seek refuge by Yukimura. Though she often plays a damsel in distress because of her kushi mitama, she regrets making people hurt because of her and decides to run away. Ana encourages her, reminding her that strength comes in different shapes, boosting her confidence to become one of Yukimura's braves. She harbors feelings for Saizo. Among the braves, Isanami is the darkness. Later it is revealed that she was the goddess of darkness that took 1000 peoples' lives, and the only one that can stop her is Saizo.

Sasuke Sarutobi (猿飛 佐助, Sarutobi Sasuke)
Voiced by: Tetsuya Kakihara

A ninja who can communicate with animals and is always composed. He often blushes when he's talking to Isanami. His element is grass.

Yukimura Sanada (真田 幸村, Sanada Yukimura)
Voiced by: Toshiyuki Morikawa

The Lord that gathers the 10 braves. He has a very nonchalant attitude, but his subordinates are all loyal to him, especially Rokuro. He seems to possess the power to battle by demonstrating the small duel between him and Date Masamune.

Anastasia (アナスタシア)
Voiced by: Yū Asakawa

The stranded princess from Europe and also Saizo's childhood friend. Because she wishes to return honor to her family, Hanzo is able to trick her and makes her his pawn, forcing her to betray Yukimura and the braves. Her element is ice.

Benmaru (望月 六郎 (弁丸))
Voiced by: Izumi Kitta

A child that Yukimura met on the way to Kyoto. He excels in traps and bombs. His element was fire. While he was one of the Ten Braves, Yukimura officially adopted him as his son. After his adoption, he is now known as Yukimura Daisuke.

Masamune Date (伊達 政宗, Date Masamune)
Voiced by: Takehito Koyasu

The commander who controls Oushu. He has an eye patch over his right eye and white hair. He once kidnapped Isanami because he wanted to destroy kushi mitama, which was said to be able to quell the chaos in the world. He pays careful attention to Yukimura.

Hattori Hanzō (服部 半蔵, Hanzō Hattori)
Voiced by: Takahiro Sakurai

The head of the five Iga ninja. He is faster than Saizo. He chases Isanami because she was the goddess of darkness. Later, due to his greed and arrogance in thinking that he could tame the pure darkness, his right hand was devoured by Isanami. His element is fire, taking the place of Benmaru after his adoption.

Kakei Juzo (筧 十蔵, Juzo Kakei)
Voiced by: Ryōtarō Okiayu

An uptight and traditional samurai who excels in sniping. He is loyal to Sanada Yukimura. He loves his guns to the point of naming them one by one. His element is metal.

Jinpachi Nezu (根津 甚八, Nezu Jinpachi)
Voiced by: Kazuya Nakai

The head of a band pirates controlling Lake Biwa. He loves drinking sake, women, and his ship. He once rejected the fact that Isanami is a woman because of her small chest. His partner is a black panther named Veronica. His element is lightning.

Miyoshi Seikai Nyuudou (三好清海入道, Nyuudou Miyoshi Seikai)
Voiced by: Kazunari Tanaka

Miyoshi picked Isanami in Izumo when she was a baby. When he learned about Isanami he became confused with the path of God and went in search of his own god. He thought of Isanami as his own sister and went to great lengths to protect her. He has a monstrous power and muscles that can block shuriken and crush the ground. His element is earth.

Rokuro Unno (海野 六郎, Unno Rokuro)
Voiced by: Hiroshi Kamiya

Yukimura's most loyal servant. He is able to record and see through anything in his right eye, and he also has the power of sound waves. His element is water.

Kamanosuke Yuri (由利 鎌之介, Yuri Kamanosuke)
Voiced by: Motoki Takagi

It was unclear at first whether Kamanosuke was a woman or a man. Kamanosuke wields a large sickle and is able to control wind. Kamanosuke was saved by Isanami from Saizo and after he let him live, he went to follow Saizo to battle him more. He was later chosen by Yukimura to be one of the braves.

Ishida Mitsunari (石田 三成, Mitsunari Ishida)
Voiced by: Hikaru Midorikawa

A feudal lord of Aizu. He tried to be Yukimura's ally to fight the Tokugawa clan.

Naoe Kanetsugu (直江 兼続, Kanetsugu Naoe)
Voiced by: Shinichiro Miki

A feudal lord of Saweyama. He supported Mitsunari to form an alliance with Yukimura.

== Media ==
=== Manga ===
The initial BRAVE10 manga run lasted for four years, from 2006 to 2010. A total of 8 volumes were released, which adds up to 47 chapters.

In 2011, Brave 10 S or Brave 10 Spiral (ブレイブ・テン・スパイラル) was released and sold as a continuation of the original series. 9 volumes were published with a similar chapter count to its predecessor, counting up to 48 total.

=== Anime ===
On November 15, 2011, an anime adaptation was announced its official YouTube channel. The series was produced by TMS Entertainment and directed by Kiyoko Sayama. Mamiko Ikeda is in charge of the scripts, Yukiko Ban designed the characters, and Seikou Nagaoka composed the music. The anime premiered on Tokyo MX from January 8 to March 27, 2012. The anime is licensed by Crunchyroll for streaming outside of Asia. On January 5, 2012, NIS America announced that it had acquired the home video rights to the Brave 10 television anime series and released it on DVD on October 8, 2013. Discotek Media released the series on Blu-ray on February 23, 2021.

No.	Title	Original release date
1	"The Fateful Two"; Transliteration: "Unmei no Futatsu" (Japanese: 運命のふたり)	January 8, 2012
Kirigakure Saizo, the wandering ninja, saved the life of Isanami, the priestess of Izumo. He agreed to take her to Ueda after she treated him to soba noodles. After escorting her to Ueda, he got into a fight with Sarutobi Sasuke, the leader of the Sanada ninja, which was broken up by Isanami stating that she was a shrine maiden who wished to meet Yukimura Sanada. After meeting him and his subordinate Rokurou, she told him about how the shrine was attacked and burned down. She was the only person who survived, with the aid of the High Priest who asked her to go to Yukimura Sanada for help. Yukimura refused to help, saying that it was too dangerous for him to go against the 'fox', but he let her stay the night. Isanami left, following Saizou. She convinced to him let her tag along. They fell into a trap made by Isanami's pursuers. Saizo and Isanami found that they were actually bait for the pursuers, so that Yukimura could catch them. Saizo managed to fight them off. Isanami snapped and a dome of darkness surrounded her, instantly devouring the pursuers. Isanami had no recollection of this. After the event, Yukimura told her that he would take care of her. Isanami then asked Yukimura to employ Saizou as he did not serve any lord. Saizo protested, but Isanami reminded him that she treated him with soba, causing Saizo to give in. Later while Yukimura discussed this with Rokurou, Yukimura said that his hands were not enough and that he required ten more to be his fingers. Rokurou attacked Saizou who was eavesdropping from the floor above. The attack causes him to faint as soon as he reached his room. The next morning, Saizo found Isanami in his futon, freaking him out and causing him to flip the futon sideways with Isanami inside.
2	"Dark and Light"; Transliteration: "Dāku to Raito" (Japanese: 闇と光)	January 15, 2012
A rumor of an uwabami has been circling around the land, while the people prepare for the harvest festival. Saizo decides to kill the beast, but according to what he discovers the kingdom is in far more danger...
3	"Valley of Whirlwinds"; Transliteration: "Wāru no Tani" (Japanese: 旋風の谷)	January 22, 2012
Saizo, Isanami, and Kakei are ambushed by the thief Kamanosuke. Enjoying the battle, Kamanosuke kidnaps and tortures Isanami to draw out the cold killer within Saizo.
4	"The Souls of the Gods"; Transliteration: "Kamigami no Tamashī" (Japanese: 神々の魂)	January 29, 2012
With Isanami's help, the braves discover a staircase to a cavern. Once there they are ambushed by Hanzo and Okatsu looking for the Kushimi Jewel. With Saizo injured and Kakei under Okatsu's spell, an unexpected wind comes to help.
5	"The Heart of the Dragon"; Transliteration: "Doragon no Seishin" (Japanese: 竜の懐)	February 5, 2012
Saizo has lost his will to battle after Isanami was kidnapped by Date Masamune. Yukimura sends Sasuke and Anastasia to assist in the rescue. Isanami herself, has lost her resolve, she fears that everybody around her will be hurt. Can they overcome their insecurities or is their time over?
6	"Taizen Meido"; Transliteration: "Meido Taizen" (Japanese: 大山鳴動)	February 12, 2012
Yukimura invites all of his braves to the hot spring. When there Saizo, Sasuke, and Kamanosuke get in a fight with a monk named Seikai.
7	"Sword and Fan"; Transliteration: "Ken to Fan" (Japanese: 剣と扇)	February 18, 2012
A tea ceremony summoned all lords to the palace. Yukimura decides to travel with Rokuro, Saizo, and Isanami. On the road there, they face many traps, making Yukimura wish he brought more braves...
8	"The Birth of a Warrior"; Transliteration: "Senshi no Tanjō" (Japanese: 勇士誕生)	February 25, 2012
Ieyasu has announced that Yukimura is to be executed on the spot if he does not surrender. Blocked by the sea and an army chasing him, help comes from a new warrior; one powerful enough to stop Seikai's blows with one hand.
9	"The True Face of Ice"; Transliteration: "Kōri no Shin no Kao" (Japanese: 氷の素顔)	March 4, 2012
Saizou learned the true purpose of the gathering of the 10 braves by Yukimura. Ana attacked Rokuro to stole the information hidden in his right eyes and later Isanami learned about her true nature with the kushi mitama.
10	"The Start of Tragedy"; Transliteration: "Higeki no Hajimari" (Japanese: 惨劇の幕開け)	March 13, 2012
The Iga clan ambushed the ten braves. When Saizo is on the verge of losing against Hanzo, Izanami's power as the goddess of darkness is awakens.
11	"The Wail of Darkness"; Transliteration: "Yami no Nageki" (Japanese: 闇の慟哭)	March 20, 2012
With each of the braves losing, Isanami wishes for a greater power and decides to throw the kushi mitama away in exchange, so to receive the power of darkness.
12	"The Warrior of Light"; Transliteration: "Hikari no Senshi" (Japanese: 光の勇士)	March 27, 2012
Izanami awakens as the goddess of darkness and the power of darkness falls throughout the grounds. The braves are strengthened and retaliate against the enemy. Rokuro tries to weaken Izanami, who has turned into a pure darkness, by sacrificing himself, but Saizo stops him, taking his place to enter the darkness to rescue Isanami.

=== Radio ===
There is a Web Radio program called "柿原徹也・ 森川智之の BRAVE10 on the radio", starring Japanese seiyū as host: Tetsuya Kakihara as Sarutobi Sasuke (猿飛佐助, Sarutobi Sasuke) and Toshiyuki Morikawa as Yukimura Sanada (真田幸村, Sanada Yukimura). It was first broadcast online in December 2011.

Sometimes, guests from the Japanese anime cast are featured on the radio chat.

The "柿原徹也・ 森川智之の BRAVE10 on the radio" program is also released on DVD and Mobacon format in Japan. There are five volumes being released. The first volume was released on January 27, 2012, in Japan. People who pre-ordered the first volume received special photos from the Japanese voice acting radio cast.
