= Dance in the Vampire Bund =

Japanese manga series

- The cover of the first volume, featuring Mina Țepeș

ダンス イン ザ ヴァンパイアバンド (Dansu in za Vanpaia Bando)
- Genre: Action, dark fantasy, psychological horror
- Manga
- Written by: Nozomu Tamaki
- Published by: Media Factory
- English publisher: NA: Seven Seas Entertainment
- Magazine: Monthly Comic Flapper
- Original run: December 5, 2005 – September 5, 2012
- Volumes: 14
- Manga

Dive in the Vampire Bund
- Written by: Nozomu Tamaki
- Published by: Media Factory
- English publisher: NA: Seven Seas Entertainment
- Original run: 2009 – 2013
- Volumes: 2
- Anime television series
- Directed by: Akiyuki Shinbo; Masahiro Sonoda
- Produced by: Nobuhiro Oosawa (Genco); Toshiaki Asaka (Media Factory)
- Written by: Hiroyuki Yoshino
- Music by: Akio Dobashi
- Studio: Shaft (Note: Animation assistance (アニメーション協力) for all episodes provided by A.C.G.T.)
- Licensed by: AUS: Madman Entertainment; NA: Funimation; UK: Manga Entertainment
- Original network: AT-X, CTC, tvk, TV Saitama, TV Aichi, Tokyo MX, Sun TV
- Original run: January 7, 2010 – April 1, 2010
- Episodes: 12
- Manga

Dance in the Vampire Bund: The Memories of Sledgehammer
- Written by: Nozomu Tamaki
- Published by: Media Factory
- English publisher: NA: Seven Seas Entertainment
- Magazine: Monthly Comic Flapper
- Original run: November 5, 2012 – November 5, 2013
- Volumes: 3
- Manga

Dance in the Vampire Bund II: Scarlet Order
- Written by: Nozomu Tamaki
- Published by: Media Factory
- English publisher: NA: Seven Seas Entertainment
- Magazine: Monthly Comic Flapper
- Original run: December 5, 2013 – April 4, 2015
- Volumes: 4
- Manga

Dance in the Vampire Bund: Age of Scarlet Order
- Written by: Nozomu Tamaki
- Published by: TO Books
- English publisher: NA: Seven Seas Entertainment
- Imprint: Corona Comics
- Magazine: Comic Corona
- Original run: May 28, 2018 – present
- Volumes: 20

Dance in the Vampire Bund (Japanese: ダンス イン ザ ヴァンパイアバンド, Hepburn: Dansu in za Vanpaia Bando) is a Japanese manga series written and illustrated by Nozomu Tamaki. The manga was serialized in Media Factory's seinen manga magazine Monthly Comic Flapper between 2005 and 2012, and is licensed for publication in English by Seven Seas Entertainment.

Three sequels, Dive in the Vampire Bund, Dance in the Vampire Bund: The Memories of Sledgehammer, and Dance in the Vampire Bund II: Scarlet Order, were published between 2009 and 2015. A fourth sequel, Dance in the Vampire Bund: Age of Scarlet Order, launched in May 2018 and is currently ongoing. All four series, as well as two dōjinshi collections, have been licensed by Seven Seas Entertainment.

The plot follows the emergence of vampires into the human world and explores how fear on both sides changes the world's status quo as they come into conflict with those who desire peace.

A 12-episode anime television series, produced by Shaft, was aired in 2010. However, the anime does not stay true to the manga.

== Plot ==
The story revolves around Mina Țepeș, Princess-Ruler of all vampires, and her werewolf protector Akira Kaburagi Regendorf. Like other vampires, Mina has been in hiding with her people for many years. Seeking to end centuries of isolation, Mina gains permission to create a special district for vampires called "The Bund" off the coast of Tokyo, Japan by paying off the entire national debt of the Japanese government with her family's vast wealth.

Following a discussion show where known vampire movie actor Seiichi Hirai (who was revealed to be an actual vampire) is killed by her during his rampage, Mina reveals to the world the existence of vampires while mentioning her desire for both races to live together as they are residing on "The Bund". However, tensions run high as fearful humans and extremist vampire factions begin to interfere with Mina's wish for peace with the human world. This causes Mina and Akira to defend "The Bund" from these attackers.

=== The Bund ===
The Bund (also known as Tokyo Landfill #0) is a special man-made island district that floats in Tokyo Bay off the coast of Tokyo. Mina had it built to serve as a colony for the Vampires and Werewolves.

While Vampires are the primary civilians living in the Bund, Mina's Werewolf guards called the Beowulf also live there full-time for her protection. Humans of great significance (either politically or through personal relationship to Mina) are allowed to visit the Bund. The only connection from the mainland to the Bund is through a single tunnel. The Bund has no bridges or major ports.

There is also an underground city in the Bund that is inhabited by the Fangless (vampires who ripped out their own fangs) as a way for them to live freely and without persecution.

== Media ==
=== Manga ===
Written and illustrated by Nozomu Tamaki, Dance in the Vampire Bund began serialization in the January 2006 issue of Media Factory's Monthly Comic Flapper magazine on December 5, 2005, and it concluded with the October 2012 issue on September 5, 2012. The series was collected into fourteen tankōbon volumes between June 2006 and October 2012. Seven Seas Entertainment announced their license to the series at Anime Expo 2007. TO Books began publishing a two-in one omnibus reprint of the series in June 2018. The reprint includes color pages and new short short stories featuring Mina.

The two-volume Dive in the Vampire Bund (ダイブ イン ザ ヴァンパイアバンド, Daibu in za Vanpaia Bando) spin-off was published in Japan between January 2010 and March 2013. Seven Seas licensed it in October 2010.

A mini-series titled Dance in the Vampire Bund: The Memories of Sledgehammer (ダンス イン ザ ヴァンパイアバンド スレッジ・ハマーの追憶, Dansu in za Vanpaia Bando: Surejji Hamā no Tsuioku) began serialization in the December 2012 issue of Comic Flapper on November 5, 2012. It ended on November 5, 2013, and was compiled into three volumes between March and December 2013. The mini-series was also licensed by Seven Seas, who announced the series in October 2013.

Tamaki was originally scheduled to launch a second series of the main manga in spring 2013, but it was delayed. He began publishing Dance in the Vampire Bund II: Scarlet Order (スカーレット オーダー ダンス イン ザ ヴァンパイアバンド2, Sukāretto Ōdā - Dansu in za Vanpaia Bando 2) in the January 2014 issue of Comic Flapper on December 5, 2013. The series ended on April 4, 2015, and was published as four volumes between April 2014 and April 2015. In June 2014, Seven Seas announced that they had acquired the rights to the sequel.

On March 9, 2018, Tamaki announced via Twitter that he would be starting a new manga in the series, titled Dance in the Vampire Bund: Age of Scarlet Order (ダンス イン ザ ヴァンパイアバンド A.S.O, Dansu in za Vanpaia Bando A.S.O.), (Note: Short for "Age of Scarlet Order".) and that the series would be a continuation of Dance in the Vampire Bund II: Scarlet Order. The series launched on TO Books Nico Nico Seiga-based online magazine Comic Corona on May 28, 2018. Seven Seas announced their license to the title in March 2019.

Seven Seas also published two dōjinshi collections, Dance in the Vampire Bund: Forgotten Tales and Dance in the Vampire Bund: Secret Chronicles, which Tamaki had previously released only at Comiket.

=== Anime ===
An anime television series adaptation was announced in the August 2009 issue of Monthly Comic Flapper on July 4, 2009. The series was directed by Akiyuki Shinbo and Masahiro Sonoda, and written by Hiroyuki Yoshino, with animation by the studio Shaft. Naoyuki Konno provided character designs for the anime, and Akio Dobashi composed the series' music. A promotional video for the series was shown at the 76th Comiket in October 2009.

The 12-episode series premiered on January 7, 2010, and was broadcast on AT-X, Chiba TV, tvk, TV Saitama, Tokyo MX, TV Aichi, and Sun TV. A compilation episode aired on February 25, 2010, pushing back the broadcast of the series beginning with episode 8, and causing episode 12 to be run in a different timeslot, where it replaced a rerun of He Is My Master.

The series is licensed by Funimation in the United States and by Madman Entertainment in Australia and New Zealand. Manga Entertainment announced its license to the series at the London MCM Expo on May 28, 2011.

==== Censorship ====
Initially, Funimation announced that the U.S. release would be released in an edited format, because of "controversial elements which, when taken out of context, could be objectionable to some audiences", and which Funimation considered "inappropriate for U.S. viewing and [...] not essential to the storyline" (nudity involving Princess Mina, who has the outward appearance of a child). Another title, Strike Witches, was released unedited, despite containing some similar elements. After negative fan reaction to edited DVD and Blu-ray releases, Funimation released another statement on March 10, 2010, stating that the company expected to release the show unedited based on the first seven episodes, but would make a final decision once the company had seen the final five episodes to ensure that they complied with U.S. law. Funimation later confirmed that the DVD and Blu-ray release would be unedited. It was released on June 14, 2011.

In July 2011, Manga Entertainment, who had acquired the series for distribution in the United Kingdom, announced that an uncut version of the series had been passed by the BBFC with a "15" rating. This version was released on October 24, 2011.

In June 2015, it was announced that the anime was one of 38 anime and manga titles that had been blacklisted by the Chinese Ministry of Culture, making the distribution of it in any form illegal.

== Reception ==
A number of volumes in the series have made it onto the New York Times Manga Best Sellers list:

- Volume seven was on the list for one week, appearing at seventh place.
- Volume eight was on the list for two weeks, at second and ninth place.
- Volume nine was on the list for two weeks, at eighth and seventh place.
- Volume ten was on the list for two weeks, at third and tenth place.
- Volume eleven was on the list for one week, at second place.
- Volume twelve was on the list for one week at sixth place.
- Volume thirteen was on the list for two weeks, at first and ninth place.
- Volume fourteen was on the list for one week, at second place.
