= Monthly Comic Flapper =

Japanese manga magazine

- Cover of the December 2010 issue of Monthly Comic Flapper, published by Media Factory on November 5, 2010
- Categories: Seinen manga
- Frequency: Monthly
- First issue: November 5, 1999
- Company: Media Factory
- Country: Japan
- Language: Japanese
- Website: www.comic-flapper.com

Monthly Comic Flapper (Japanese: 月刊コミックフラッパー, Hepburn: Gekkan Komikku Furappā) is a monthly Japanese seinen manga magazine, published on the 5th each month by Media Factory since November 5, 1999, as a successor to Comic Alpha. The magazine celebrated its 100th issue on February 5, 2008 (March issue 2008).

On July 13, 2022, a supplemental magazine for Flapper called Monthly Comic Alunna began publishing. Alunna will focus on manga by notable online influencers and creators, with some titles currently being published in Flapper moving to the new magazine.

== Serialized titles ==
- 7 Billion Needles
- Atagoul ha neko no mori by Hiroshi Masumura
- Brave 10
- Candy Boy
- Chio-chan no Tsūgakuro
- Dance in the Vampire Bund
- Denkigai no Honya-san
- Fantastic Children
- Girls und Panzer
- Guin Saga
- Kage Kara Mamoru!
- Kamisama Kazoku
- Kuma Miko: Girl Meets Bear
- Locke the Superman
- Madan no Ō to Vanadis
- Love Bullet (ongoing)
- Lycoris Recoil (ongoing)
- Math Girls
- Mushoku Tensei (ongoing)
- My Wife Has No Emotion (hiatus)
- Najica Blitz Tactics
- Nijū Mensō no Musume
- Overman King Gainer
- Sennen Kitsune: Kanpō "Sōjinki" yori (ongoing)
- Space Adventure Cobra: Magic Doll
- The Rising of the Shield Hero (ongoing)
- Togari Shiro
- Tonari no Seki-kun (ongoing)
- Tono to Issho
- Translucent
- Twin Spica
- Vamos Lá!
- Vampire Hunter D
- Young Ladies Don't Play Fighting Games (ongoing)

=== Monthly Comic Alunna ===
- Grandpa and Grandma Turn Young Again
