= Media Factory =

Japanese publisher and brand company

- Native name: メディアファクトリー
- Romanized name: Mediafakutorī
- Formerly: Recruit Publishing, Inc. (1986–1991); Media Factory, Inc. (1991–2013)
- Type: Division
- Industry: Publishing
- Founded: December 1, 1986; 39 years ago
- Fate: Folded into Kadokawa Corporation in October 2013. Currently active as a label for Kadokawa.
- Headquarters: Fujimi, Chiyoda, Tokyo, Japan
- Products: Books, manga, light novels
- Owner: Kadokawa

Media Factory (Japanese: メディアファクトリー, Hepburn: Mediafakutorī), formerly known as Media Factory, Inc. (Japanese: 株式会社メディアファクトリー, Hepburn: Kabushiki gaisha Mediafakutorī), is a Japanese publisher and brand company of Kadokawa.

== History ==
The company was founded on December 1, 1986, and was a subsidiary of Recruit Co., Ltd., based in Shibuya, Tokyo. Media Factory was possibly the first anime distributor to ask for sites to not link to fansubs of any anime produced by the company. On October 12, 2011, Media Factory was purchased by Kadokawa Corporation for ¥8,000,000,000. Media Factory also has a monthly manga magazine, Monthly Comic Alive, and its own light novel imprint, MF Bunko J. Media Factory also holds the license for the distribution of The 39 Clues in Japan. Media Factory ceased being a kabushiki gaisha on October 1, 2013, when it was merged with eight other companies to become a brand company of Kadokawa Corporation. It had a record label, Pikachu Records, that produced Pokémon CDs and Pokémon soundtracks in Japan from 1997 to 2012. Most Pokémon albums in Japan came from Pikachu Records during this period. It was retired when Media Factory was purchased by Kadokawa Corporation. In 2014, Media Factory officially retired the Japanese video rights to the Pokémon animated series and film library, which was distributed on behalf of Shogakukan. On August 17, 2021, the website for Media Factory was officially closed with a notice directing readers to Kadokawa's website for future products and services.

== Magazines ==
- Comic Cune
- Da Vinci
- Monthly Comic Alive
- Monthly Comic Flapper
- Monthly Comic Gene

== Light novel imprints ==
- Fleur Bunko Bleu Line
- Fleur Bunko Rouge Line
- MF Books
- MF Bunko DA VINCI
- MF Bunko DA VINCI MEW
- MF Bunko J

== Anime series ==
The following anime and manga titles are associated with Kadokawa Corporation / Media Factory

- Absolute Duo (Manga, TV)
- Akane Maniax (OAV)
- Area 88 (TV, manga)
- Aquarion Evol (manga)
- ATASHIn'CHI (movie)
- Baka and Test (TV)
- Brave 10 (TV)
- Burst Angel (TV)
- Candy Boy (manga)
- Dance in the Vampire Bund (manga)
- Danball Senki (TV)
- D-Frag! (TV)
- Demons' Crest (manga)
- Divergence Eve (TV)
- Dokkoida?! (TV)
- Fantastic Children (TV)
- Gad Guard (TV)
- Gankutsuou (TV)
- Gate Keepers (TV)
- Genshiken (TV)
- Gift ~eternal rainbow~ (TV)
- Ginga Reppuu Baxinger (TV)
- Ginga Senpuu Braiger (TV)
- Ginga Shippu Sasuraiger (TV)
- Gravion (TV)
- Green Green (OVA)
- High School DxD (TV)
  - High School DxD New (TV)
  - High School DxD BorN (TV)
- Ikki Tousen (TV)
- Kage Kara Mamoru! (TV)
- Kamisama Kazoku (TV)
- Kanokon (TV, OAV)
- Kimi ga Nozomu Eien (TV)
- Kujibiki Unbalance (OAV)
- Kurau: Phantom Memory (TV)
- Made in Abyss (TV)
- Mai, the Psychic Girl (manga)
- Maria Holic (TV)
- Mouse (TV)
- Najica Blitz Tactics (TV, manga)
- No Game No Life (TV, manga)
- Overlord
- Okusama wa Mahou Shoujo (TV)
- Planetarian: The Reverie of a Little Planet (ONA)
  - Planetarian: Storyteller of the Stars (Movie)
- Plawres Sanshiro (TV)
- Pokémon films
- Pokémon: The First Movie (movie)
- Pokémon: The Movie 2000 (movie)
- Pokémon 3: The Movie (movie)
- Pokémon 4Ever (movie)
- Pokémon Heroes (movie)
- Pokémon: Jirachi—Wish Maker (movie)
- Pokémon: Destiny Deoxys (movie)
- Pokémon: Lucario and the Mystery of Mew (movie)
- Pokémon Ranger and the Temple of the Sea (movie)
- Pokémon: The Rise of Darkrai (movie)
- Pokémon: Giratina & the Sky Warrior (movie)
- Pokémon: Arceus and the Jewel of Life (movie)
- Pokémon: Zoroark: Master of Illusions (movie)
- Pokémon the Movie: Black—Victini and Reshiram and White—Victini and Zekrom (movie)
- Prince of Stride (TV)
- Project A-ko (movie)
  - Project A-ko 2: Plot of the Daitokuji Financial Group (OAV)
  - Project A-ko 3: Cinderella Rhapsody (OAV)
  - Project A-ko 4: Final (OAV)
  - A-Ko The Versus (OAV)
- Pugyuru (TV)
- Queen's Blade (TV, OAV)
- RahXephon (TV, OAV, movie)
- Reign: The Conqueror (TV)
- School Rumble (TV)
- Shura no Toki (TV)
- Soul Eater (TV)
- Sousei no Aquarion (TV)
- Strawberry Panic! (TV) - Sponsor, DVD sales
- Tenbatsu Angel Rabbie (OAV)
- The World of Narue (TV)
- Translucent (manga)
- Twin Spica (TV, manga)
- UFO Ultramaiden Valkyrie (TV)
  - UFO Princess Valkyrie 2 (TV)
  - UFO Princess Valkyrie Deluxe (OAV)
- Unbreakable Machine-Doll (TV)
- Vandread (TV)
  - Vandread Taidouhen (OAV)
  - Vandread: The Second Stage (TV)
- Magical Girl Lyrical Nanoha (TV)
- Magical Girl Lyrical Nanoha ViVid (TV)
- Fate/kaleid liner Prisma Illya (TV)
- Cardcaptor Sakura (TV)
- Slayers (TV)
- Mobile Suit Gundam Wing (TV)
- Wandaba Style (TV)
- Zaion: I Wish You Were Here (TV)
- Zero no Tsukaima (Manga, TV)

== Music artists ==
- MYTH & ROID (2015–present)
- Konomi Suzuki (2012–2017, 2020–present)
- Masayoshi Ōishi (2014–2018)
- OxT (2015–present)
- Quadrangle (2016–2018)
- nonoc (2018–2024)
- Riko Azuna (2018–2023, 2026–present)
- Mayu Maeshima (2021–present)
- Kashitaro Ito (2020–present)
- Luminous Witches (2020–present)
- Yuka Iguchi (2022–present)
- BAD TOWN REVERSAL (2022–present)
- Sajou no Hana (2022–present)
- konoco (2022)
- Teary Planet (2022)
- Mai Mizuhashi (2006–2011)
- Asuka Ōkura (2013)
- Hanatan (2023–present)
