= The Irregular at Magic High School season 2 =

Second season of The Irregular at Magic High School anime television series

The Irregular at Magic High School
- Season 2
- Promotional poster for the second season.
- No. of episodes: 13

Release
- Original network: Tokyo MX
- Original release: October 4 – December 27, 2020

Season chronology
- ← Previous; Season 1 Next → Season 3

The Irregular at Magic High School is an anime adaptation of a light novel series written by Tsutomu Satō. At the "Dengeki Bunko Aki no Namahōsō Festival" event on October 6, 2019, a second season of the anime series was announced and originally scheduled to air in July 2020, adapting the "Visitor Arc" in the novel series, but it has been delayed to October 4, 2020, due to the COVID-19 pandemic. The main staff and cast from the 2017 film are reprising their roles in the second season. ASCA performed the opening theme song "Howling", while Miki Satō performed the ending theme song "Na mo Nai Hana". Aniplex of America announced its acquisition the anime series, and originally announced that Funimation would stream it exclusively, but Hulu ended up streaming the series as well. On November 13, 2020, Funimation announced that the second season of the series would receive an English dub.

With the release of the eleventh episode of the series, the timeline of the 2017 anime film The Irregular at Magic High School: The Movie – The Girl Who Summons the Stars was revealed to be taking place during its commercial break.

== Episodes ==
No. overall	No. in season	Title	Directed by	Storyboarded by	Original release date	Ref.
27	1	"Visitor Arc I"; Transliteration: "Raihō-sha-hen I" (Japanese: 来訪者編I)	Daisuke Eguchi	Risako Yoshida	October 4, 2020	
Two months after Scorched Halloween incident, Tatsuya and his friends hold a going-away party for Shizuku who will be studying abroad in America. With the start of the new semester, an exchange student from America arrives at First High School.
28	2	"Visitor Arc II"; Transliteration: "Raihō-sha-hen II" (Japanese: 来訪者編II)	Jun'ichi Takaoka	Junichi Takaoka	October 11, 2020	
A series of murders have begun in downtown Shibuya that are being described as 'vampire' attacks due to the victims missing blood. The USNA are hard on the hunt for the fugitives in Tokyo and Leo gets caught up in the whole situation and ends up hospitalised.
29	3	"Visitor Arc III"; Transliteration: "Raihō-sha-hen III" (Japanese: 来訪者編III)	Shigetaka Ikeda	Katsumi Terahigashi	October 18, 2020	
The vampire that attacked Leo was a demon called a 'parasite'. Tatsuya seeks aid from his mentor whilst the Saegusa and Jumonji Families decide to join forces to solve this case. Mikihiko and Erika search for the parasite to get revenge for Leo, and they confront a mysterious masked magician.
30	4	"Visitor Arc IV"; Transliteration: "Raihō-sha-hen IV" (Japanese: 来訪者編IV)	Jimmy Stone	Jimmy Stone	October 25, 2020	
It turns out that the masked magician that fought with Erika was Lina. With her identity blown, Lina uses the Parade spell to attack Tatsuya and a skirmish ensues. Both parties receive reinforcements and things quickly escalate. In the aftermath intel is attained and given to the other parties hunting for the 'vampires'.
31	5	"Visitor Arc V"; Transliteration: "Raihō-sha-hen V" (Japanese: 来訪者編V)	Kunio Wakabayashi	Manabu Ono	November 1, 2020	
A parasite is an information body that was generated from the spirit dimension. How could an entity from another dimension appear in the physical world? An evil visitor of unknown origin infiltrates its way into First High School.
32	6	"Visitor Arc VI"; Transliteration: "Raihō-sha-hen VI" (Japanese: 来訪者編VI)	Daishi Katō	Risako Yoshida	November 8, 2020	
Valentine's Day is a tradition and a source of joy and grief for many even at a distinguished institution like Magic High School. What will happen this year on Valentine's Day?
33	7	"Visitor Arc VII"; Transliteration: "Raihō-sha-hen VII" (Japanese: 来訪者編VII)	Kazuo Miyake	Satoshi Shimizu	November 15, 2020	
Colonel Balance orders Lina to capture, or if that is not possible, kill the caster who was responsible for Scorched Halloween and gives Lina a custom-made device called 'the Brionac' to do so. Meanwhile, at First High, Pixie starts malfunctioning and makes a shocking declaration.
34	8	"Visitor Arc VIII"; Transliteration: "Raihō-sha-hen VIII" (Japanese: 来訪者編VIII)	Tatsuya Sasaki	Satoshi Shimizu	November 22, 2020	
The Yotsuba Family intervenes to eliminate the threat to Tatsuya from the USNA military forces. After questioning Pixie about the remaining parasites, Tatsuya heads to Aoyama Cemetery with Pixie, Miyuki and Honoka to lure them out while another group lurks in the shadows.
35	9	"Visitor Arc IX"; Transliteration: "Raihō-sha-hen IX" (Japanese: 来訪者編IX)	Daishi Katō, Daisuke Eguchi	Katsumi Terahigashi	November 29, 2020	
Thanks to Pixie's psychic powers, Tatsuya and his friends are finally able to capture the parasites. They leave the scene after Erika and her team arrive, but a third faction disguised as the police appear before them and snatch the parasites away. The next day they tell Tatsuya and he gives a warning to Mayumi for her father, but the parasites are executed by someone who attacks the facility. Tatsuya investigates and upon learning who attacked the facility, is contacted one of the Seven Sages, Raymond Clark.
36	10	"Visitor Arc X"; Transliteration: "Raihō-sha-hen X" (Japanese: 来訪者編X)	Jimmy Stone	Jimmy Stone	December 6, 2020	
As instructed by Raymond, Tatsuya and his friends head to the outdoor training area behind First High School and detect the presence of parasites gathering at the scene. A clash with Lina, who is hell-bent on completing her mission, is inevitable.
37	11	"Visitor Arc XI"; Transliteration: "Raihō-sha-hen XI" (Japanese: 来訪者編XI)	Jimmy Stone	Katsumi Terahigashi	December 13, 2020	
Roughly a month after the parasite incident, Tatsuya and his friends bid farewell to Mayumi, Mari, Katsuto and the other seniors at First High School's 29th graduation ceremony and the school year comes to a close and the new one begins.
38	12	"Visitor Arc XII"; Transliteration: "Raihō-sha-hen XII" (Japanese: 来訪者編XII)	Kazuo Miyake	Katsumi Terahigashi	December 20, 2020	
Tatsuya and Miyuki are invited to a party to commemorate the completion of Japan's first hyper-building offshore tower, there Hayama introduces a young girl called Sakurai Minami. The two are shaken upon seeing her face which is that of a woman who died in an incident three years earlier. At such a time, there is intelligence that the party is being targeted by extremist magic advocates – The Advancement of Humanity Front.
39	13	"Visitor Arc XIII"; Transliteration: "Raihō-sha-hen XIII" (Japanese: 来訪者編XIII)	Munenori Nawa, Kazuo Miyake	Katsumi Terahigashi	December 27, 2020	
The Advancement of Humanity Front have declared they will 'blow up the offshore tower in one hour'. But there is no guarantee they will keep to their one-hour time limit. For the sake of preventing the Advancement of Humanity Front's scheme, Tatsuya takes Miyuki and Minami towards the control centre on the first underground floor.
