= Désir =

- The regular edition cover

Single by Garnidelia

from the album G.R.N.D.
- B-side: "Wasurenagusa"
- Released: August 23, 2017
- Recorded: 2017
- Studio: Parasight Mastering (Tokyo, Japan)
- Genre: J-pop
- Length: 4:44
- Label: Sacra Music
- Songwriter: Maria
- Producer: Garnidelia

Garnidelia singles chronology
"Speed Star" (2017)	"Désir" (2017)	"Aikotoba" (2017)

Alternative cover
- The limited anime edition cover

Music video
- "Désir" on YouTube

"Désir" (Desire) is a song by Japanese pop rock duo Garnidelia. It was released as the unit's seventh single on August 23, 2017. It reached number 14 on Oricon and number 19 on Japan Hot 100. It was used as the ending theme song for the anime series Fate/Apocrypha.

== Release ==
On 6 May 2017, the official website of the anime Fate/Apocrypha revealed about the theme song for the show, including the ending song "Désir" that would be sung by Garnidelia. The song was released as a single on 23 August 2017 in three editions; Regular edition, Limited edition and Limited anime edition. The single reached number 14 on Oricon, 19 on Japan Hot 100, and 7 on Japan Hot Animation with spent 6, 3 and 2 weeks respectively. The song was featured in their third album "G.R.N.D.".

== Music video ==
The music video for "Désir" was directed by Shin Okawa. The video tells the story of a human girl enamored with an antlered humanoid creature. The being, who loves her as well, is disliked by other human beings, and they attempt to keep it away from the young lady. (Note: The story is inspired by Beauty and The Beast) . Some scenes show toku playing the piano in a house, and Maria in a blue dress singing in a forest. The video ends with the creature mourning the girl after she dies protecting it from hunters.

== Track listing ==
All tracks written by Maria.

=== Regular edition ===
CD
No.	Title	Length
1.	"Désir"	4:44
2.	"Wasurenagusa" (ワスレナグサ Forget me Not)	4:16
3.	"Special Girl"	3:46
4.	"Désir" (Instrumental)	4:44

=== Limited edition ===
CD
No.	Title	Length
1.	"Désir"	4:44
2.	"Wasurenagusa" (ワスレナグサ Forget me Not)	4:16
3.	"Special Girl"	3:46
4.	"Désir" (Instrumental)	4:44

DVD
No.	Title	Length
1.	"Désir" (music video)	4:53
2.	"LIFE" (stellacage TOUR 2017 ~Cry Out~@ Differ Ariake)
3.	"Bad Boy - Garnidelia vs Heavygrinder-" (stellacage TOUR 2017 ~Cry Out~@ Differ Ariake)
4.	"Yakusoku -Promise Code- (約束 -Promise code-)" (stellacage TOUR 2017 ~Cry Out~@ Differ Ariake)

=== Limited anime edition ===
CD
No.	Title	Length
1.	"Désir"	4:44
2.	"Wasurenagusa" (ワスレナグサ Forget me Not)	4:16
3.	"Special Girl"	3:46
4.	"Désir" (Instrumental)	4:44
5.	"Désir" (Fate/Apocrypha ED ver)	1:48

DVD
No.	Title	Length
1.	"Désir" (Fate/Apocrypha ending version without credit)	1:48

== Personnel ==
Garnidelia

- Maria – vocals
- toku – music

Bands

- Rock Sakurai - bass
- Takeo Kajiwara - guitar
- junchi. - drums
- Ayako Himata, Reiko Tsuchiya - violin and viola

Production

- Kimihiro Nakase – recording
- Satoshi Hosoi – mixer
- Hiromichi Takiguchi – mastering

== Charts ==
Year	Chart	Peak position
2017	Oricon	14
2017	Japan Hot 100	19
2017	Japan Hot Animation	7

== Release history ==
Region	Date	Label	Format	Catalog
Japan	23 August 2017	Sacra Music	CD	VVCL-1103
Japan	23 August 2017	Sacra Music	CD+DVD	VVCL-1101
Japan	23 August 2017	Sacra Music	CD+DVD	VVCL-1104
