= Yakusoku -Promise Code- =

- The regular edition cover

Single by Garnidelia

from the album Violet Cry
- B-side: "Gokuraku Jodo"
- Released: August 7, 2016 (digital); August 17, 2016 (physical)
- Recorded: 2016
- Studio: Sony Music Shinanomachi Studio (Tokyo, Japan)
- Genre: J-pop
- Length: 4:14
- Label: SME Record
- Songwriter: MARiA
- Producer: Garnidelia

Garnidelia singles chronology
"MIRAI" (2015)	"Yakusoku -Promise Code-" (2016)	"Speed Star" (2017)

Alternative cover
- The limited anime edition cover

Music video
- "Yakusoku -Promise Code-" on YouTube

"Yakusoku -Promise Code-" (約束 -Promise code-, Promise -Promise Code-) is a song by Japanese pop rock duo Garnidelia. It was released as the unit's fifth single digitally on August 7, 2016, and received physical release on August 17, 2016. The song is released along with the B-Side Gokuraku Jodo. It reached number 20 on Oricon and number 40 on Japan Hot 100. It was used as the second ending theme song for the anime series Qualidea Code.

== Release ==
On 26 March 2016, Marvelous revealed in event at the AnimeJapan 2016 event about more details of the anime series Qualidea Code, including the ending song "Yakusoku -Promise Code-" that would be sung by Garnidelia. The song was released as a single on 23 August 2020 on three edition; Regular edition, Limited edition and Limited anime edition. The single reached number 20 on Oricon, 40 on Japan Hot 100, and 8 on Japan Hot Animation with spent 7, 1 and 1 weeks respectively. The song was featured in their second album "Violet Cry".

== Music video ==
The music video for "Yakusoku -Promise Code-" was directed by Shin Okawa. The video tell a story about a girl with her friend playing in some warehouse. When they were walking after they finished playing, they saw a black virus popping up in front of them. After that, her friend got consumed by the virus even though she tries to help her, and she was crying because of her failure. When she was walking into a land with many swords stuck in the land, she take one of the sword, and she learn how to use that sword. Several years past, and the girl, now already an adult, had mastered to use the sword. She walked to the path when she and her friends encounter the virus, trying to kill the virus and save her friend. the virus summon the army to stop her but it's failed, and she finally kill the virus. Some scenes sometimes show toku playing piano and MARiA singing in the warehouse, with both of them wearing Yukata. And some scene show the land of the sword, too. The video end when the girl takes her friend's hand from the virus, saving her life.

== Track listing ==
All tracks written by MARiA.

=== Regular edition ===
CD
No.	Title	Length
1.	"Yakusoku -Promise Code-" (約束 -Promise code- Promise -Promise Code-)	4:14
2.	"Gokuraku Jodo" (極楽浄土 Paradise)	3:37
3.	"Shion" (紫苑 Tartarian Aster)	5:18
4.	"Yakusoku -Promise Code-" (約束 -Promise code- Promise -Promise Code-) (Instrumental)	4:14

=== Limited edition ===
CD
No.	Title	Length
1.	"Yakusoku -Promise Code-" (約束 -Promise code- Promise -Promise Code-)	4:14
2.	"Gokuraku Jodo" (極楽浄土 Paradise)	3:37
3.	"Shion" (紫苑 Tartarian Aster)	5:18
4.	"Yakusoku -Promise Code-" (約束 -Promise code- Promise -Promise Code-) (Instrumental)	4:14

DVD
No.	Title	Length
1.	"Yakusoku -Promise Code-" (music video)	4:53
2.	"Ningyo Hime (人魚姫)" (stellacage vol.III at Toyosu PIT LIVE 映像)
3.	"march" (stellacage vol.III at Toyosu PIT LIVE 映像)
4.	"Ookami Shoujo (オオカミ少女)" (stellacage vol.III at Toyosu PIT LIVE 映像)

=== Limited anime edition ===
No.	Title	Length
1.	"Yakusoku -Promise Code-" (約束 -Promise code- Promise -Promise Code-)	4:14
2.	"Gokuraku Jodo" (極楽浄土 Paradise)	3:37
3.	"Shion" (紫苑 Tartarian Aster)	5:18
4.	"Yakusoku -Promise Code-" (約束 -Promise code- Promise -Promise Code-) (Instrumental)	4:14
5.	"Yakusoku -Promise Code-" (約束 -Promise code- Promise -Promise Code-) (Qualidea Code ED ver)	1:30

DVD
No.	Title	Length
1.	"Yakusoku -Promise Code-" (music video)	4:53

== Personnel ==
Garnidelia

- MARiA – vocals
- toku – music, record

Bands

- Hiroshi Sekita - Bass
- Takeo Kajiwara - Guitar
- Seiichiro Hayakawa - Drums
- Ayako Himata - Violin & Viola

Production

- Shigeki Kashii, toku – record, mixer
- Hidekazu Sakai – mastering

== Charts ==
Year	Chart	Peak position
2017	Oricon	20
2017	Japan Hot 100	40
2017	Japan Hot Animation	8

== Release history ==
Region	Date	Label	Format	Catalog
Japan	17 August 2016	SME Record	CD	SECL-1946
Japan	17 August 2016	SME Record	CD+DVD	SECL-1944
Japan	17 August 2016	SME Record	CD+DVD	SECL-1947
