= Gokuraku Jodo =

Song by pop rock duo Garnidelia

- The regular edition cover

Single by Garnidelia

from the album Violet Cry
- A-side: "Yakusoku -Promise Code-"
- Released: July 28, 2016 (digital)
- Recorded: 2016
- Studio: Sony Music Shinanomachi, Tokyo, Japan
- Genre: J-pop
- Length: 3:37
- Label: SME
- Songwriter: MARiA
- Producer: Garnidelia

Music video
- "Gokuraku Jodo" on YouTube

"Gokuraku Jodo" (極楽浄土, lit. Paradise Land) is a song by Japanese pop rock duo Garnidelia. It was first released digitally on July 28, 2016, as the B-side to its advance single, "Yakusoku -Promise Code-". Despite not being used as an official single by itself, the song gained far more popularity than the single itself, considering the music dance video of this song already passed 100 million on YouTube, and it's on 113 million view as of June 21, 2026. The song received tremendous popularity in Mainland China, leading to a great number of song and dance covers on YouTube and Bilibili.

The word "Gokuraku Jodo" is a Pure Land Buddhist term that refers more specifically to Amida Buddha's Land of Ultimate Bliss. The song's theme is about an imaginary, floating pleasure world, and merely uses the religious term as a comparison.

== Background and release ==
The title of the song with the name of the dancers, the editor of the music dance video and the creator of the song Garnidelia as shown in the video

In interview with Asianbeat on 12 December 2016, MARiA stated that she had wanted to make a song with a Japanese style. When "Yakusoku -Promise Code-" was announced to be used as the ending theme song of Qualidea Code, she took inspiration from one of its sword-wielding characters, and decided to create costumes with Japanese-style fabrics. The song aimed to "fuse Japanese and dance" stylistically, with choreography made by Miume. The music dance video of the song was released on April 25, 2016, and the song was released digitally on July 28, 2016, before a physical release as the B-side to its advance single, "Yakusoku -Promise Code-" on August 17, 2016. The song is featured in their second album "Violet Cry", and also featured in their second compilation eurodance-style album "Kyouki Ranbu" (響喜乱舞, Dancing Wildly with Joy).

== Music video and reception ==
The music video that later went viral features dancing by MARiA, Miume (who also choreographed the dance) and 217 ("Niina"), the latter two both from the J-pop group COJIRASE THE TRIP, with the costumes based on Japanese style. Dancers from around the world cover the dance and upload their own renditions on YouTube, Bilibili, and Niconico. The phenomenon caused Garnidelia to be invited to perform in Bilibili Macro Link in 2017, 2018, and 2019. The Chinese boyband X Nine covered the song at their concert in Shanghai on April 2, 2017.

== Personnel ==
Garnidelia

- MARiA – vocals, dancer
- toku – music, record

Others

- G.A.Cool – Bass
- Miume – Dancer, Choreographer
- Moririn – Editor
- Mini – Logo Design
- Tommy – Assistant

Production

- toku – record, mixer
- Hidekazu Sakai – mastering
