= Speed Star =

Speed Star may refer to:

- Speed Star (album), a 2009 album by Aya Hirano
- "Speed Star" (Lead song)
- "Speed Star" (Garnidelia song)

== See also ==
- Speedstar
