= Linkage Ring =

Studio album by Garnidelia
- Released: January 21, 2015
- Genres: Pop rock, electronica, rock
- Length: 51:45
- Label: Defstar Records
- Producer: Garnidelia

Garnidelia chronology
Linkage Ring (2015)	BiRTHiA (2015)

Singles from Linkage Ring
- 1. "Ambiguous" Released: March 14, 2014; 2. "Grilletto" Released: July 30, 2014; 3. "BLAZING" Released: October 28, 2014; 4. "PRIDE" Released: January 14, 2015

Linkage Ring (sometimes stylized as LiNKAGE RiNG) is the first full-length studio album by Japanese pop rock duo Garnidelia, released on January 21, 2015 by DefSTAR Records and Sony Music Entertainment. The album is Garnidelia's first full-length studio album, after releasing self-released mini-albums that achieved limited success around Asia. After forming and signed to DefSTAR and Sony Music in 2014, the group released singles in order to promote themselves and feature their singles in various anime in Japan.

Linkage Ring achieved favorable reception from limited music critics, who praised the groups experimentation of musical genres and praised the lyrical content and production. Commercially, the album did under-perform in Japan, peaking at number eleven on the Oricon Albums Chart. Currently, four singles have been produced; "Ambiguous", "Grilletto", "BLAZING" and "PRIDE". The first three singles enjoyed moderate success on the Oricon Singles Chart, with the latter being the group's highest charting single. "PRIDE" was released as a promotional digital single in Japan. The group are expected to promote the album with their Stellarcage Tour around Japan in mid-2015.

== Background and composition ==
Garnidelia was formed by Japanese recording artist and songwriter Mai "Maria" Mizuhashi and Japanese composer and producer Yoshinori "Toku" Abe. Originally, Maria had recorded solo tracks for anime programs including Kamisama Kazoku and Hitohira, while Toku had collaborated with successful Japanese artists including LiSA and Angela Aki. Maria had enjoyed an array of success on social media, recording songs with her collaborators and herself and achieved moderate popularity in her native Japan, with her songs and videos gained over two million views. In 2010, Maria had collaborated with Toku on some tracks for various anime premieres, but the collaboration later led to talks of forming a musical duo. Maria and Toku eventually formed in mid 2010 and called their duo GARNiDELIA. The name is based on the saying Le Palais Garnier de Maria, which means "Maria's Opera House, her place to sing" and the word Cordelia. The group had released their first mini-album One, which was exclusively released on online stores including iTunes and Amazon.com. However, the effort failed to chart on the Oricon Albums Chart.

In 2012, Garnidelia recorded another self-released mini-album entitled Pluslights -21248931-, which was also released on online stores, but failed to gain any recognition and chart positions. In 2013, Garnidelia had recorded a song entitled "COLOR" which premiered on the anime television series Freezing and achieved prominent success from viewers. In March 2014, the duo signed to DefSTAR Records and had released their first commercial single "Ambiguous". This led to future collaborations with more anime televisions and more songs being produced.

Toku, who had composed all off his work, decided to the same for the album. Each song on the album was produced by both Maria and Toku, although it's accredited as the band's name. All arrangement was handled by Maria and Toku. On the album, all songs except "フタリ座流星群", "Steps", "Grilletto" and "Ambiguous" were written by Maria herself. The first three were written by Maria and Toku together, while the latter was written by Meg Rock. Musically, Linkage Ring holds prominent essence off J-pop music but mixes both rock music and electronic dance music, which is a common trait if contemporary Japanese music. According to CD-Data Magazine, the reviewer commented on the influence off dubstep music in the opening track "PRIDE" and "Lamb." and likened the influence off western pop music in "BLAZING".

== Reception ==
Professional ratings
Review scores
Source	Rating
CD-Data Magazine	4/5 stars

Linkage Ring received favorable reviews from most music critics. A reviewer from the publication CD-Data Magazine was positive and awarded the album four stars out of five. According to the review, he praised the mixture of rock music and electronic dance music, which was a prominent feature in Japanese acts and commented "you want to focus on the experiment of a pop sense [...]" Based on composition, lyrical content and commercial appeal, the reviewer awarded each category four stars out of five.

Commercially, Linkage Ring had contributed to under performing results in Japan. On the first week on 25 January, the album had debuted at number five on the Oricon Daily Chart and eleven on the Oricon Albums Chart, just missing the top ten position. According to Oricon, the album had sold approximately under 7.600 copies in its first week off sales. In its second week, the album dropped dramatically to number forty-three, with total sales of 9.536 units.

== Singles ==
The album's lead single "Ambiguous" was released on March 14. The song was used as the theme song for Kill la Kill. The song had peaked at number fifteen on the Oricon Singles Chart, becoming their first single to have charted on any Oricon or Japanese-related chart. The album's second single was "Grilletto", which was released on July 30. The song was used as the lead theme song for the anime television series The Irregular at Magic High School. The song had peaked at number seventeen on the Oricon Singles CHart, which became their lowest entry but eventually spanned as their longest charting single on the chart. The group then released their third single "BLAZING", which was released in October 2014. The song was used as the theme song for Gundam Reconguista in G and received a limited-edition physical release of the song. The song peaked at number fourteen on the Oricon Singles Chart, becoming the group's highest charting single to date. For each single, all songs received a music video.

Linkage Ring spawned two digital promotional singles: "Lamb." and "PRIDE".

== Track listing ==
All lyrics are written by Maria, except where noted.

No.	Title	Music	Producer(s)	Length
1.	"PRIDE"	toku	Garnidelia	3:48
2.	"True High"	toku	Garnidelia	3:53
3.	"Gravity"	toku	Garnidelia	3:53
4.	"BLAZING"	toku	Garnidelia	3:55
5.	"フタリ座流星群" (Maria, toku)	Maria, toku	Garnidelia	4:43
6.	"Moon Landing"	toku	Garnidelia	3:28
7.	"march"	toku	Garnidelia	5:42
8.	"Steps" (Maria, toku)	Maria, toku	Garnidelia	4:05
9.	"Lamb."	toku	Garnidelia	3:56
10.	"オオカミ少女"	toku	Garnidelia	3:47
11.	"grilletto" (Maria, toku)	toku	Garnidelia	4:08
12.	"ambiguous" (Meg Rock)	toku	Garnidelia	4:33
13.	"LiNKAGE"	toku	Garnidelia	4:26

== Charts, peaks and positions ==
=== Album positions ===
Oricon Sales Chart (Japan)

Release	Chart	Peak position	First week sales	Sales total	Chart run
January 21, 2015	Oricon Daily Album Chart	5			
January 21, 2015	Oricon Weekly Album Chart	11	7.554	12.000	5 weeks
January 21, 2015	Oricon Monthly Album Chart	N/A			
January 21, 2015	Oricon Yearly Album Chart	N/A			

=== Singles position ===
Date	Title	Peak position	Weeks
March 14, 2014	"Ambiguous"	15	9 weeks
July 30, 2014	"Grilletto"	17	11 weeks
October 24, 2014	"BLAZING"	14	9 weeks
