= Fate/Apocrypha =

Japanese light novel series

- The cover of the first Fate/Apocrypha novel featuring Ruler (center), Rider of Black (right), Berserker of Red (upper right), Lancer of Black (upper left), and Rider of Red
- Genre: Historical drama
- Created by: Yūichirō Higashide; Type-Moon
- Light novel
- Written by: Yūichirō Higashide
- Illustrated by: Ototsugu Konoe
- Published by: Type-Moon
- Original run: December 29, 2012 – December 28, 2014
- Volumes: 5
- Manga
- Written by: Yūichirō Higashide
- Illustrated by: Akira Ishida
- Published by: Kadokawa Shoten
- Magazine: Comp Ace
- Original run: June 26, 2016 – April 26, 2024
- Volumes: 16
- Anime television series
- Fate/Apocrypha (2017)
- icon

Fate/Apocrypha is a Japanese light novel series in Type-Moon's Fate franchise, written by Yūichirō Higashide and illustrated by Ototsugu Konoe. Type-Moon published five volumes from December 2012 to December 2014. A manga adaptation illustrated by Akira Ishida was serialized in Kadokawa Shoten's Comp Ace magazine from June 2016 to April 2024. An anime television series adaptation by A-1 Pictures aired from July to December 2017.

== Plot ==
Fate/Apocrypha focuses on Kairi Shishigō, a necromancer hired by the Clock Tower, who summons the Saber-class Mordred. The Red faction is led by priest Shirō Kotomine, though Shishigō remains independent, distrusting him. Shirō and his servant, Semiramis steal their command spells to control their Servants: Karna, Atalanta, Achilles, William Shakespeare, and Spartacus. Eventually the narrative switches to a malfunctioning homunculus who is named Sieg as well as the mediator of the Holy Grail War, Ruler Jeanne D'Arc. With the combined power of Siegfried and Frankenstein's Monster, Sieg can defeat Shirō, who is given a painless death by Semiramis via a poisoned kiss. The remaining Red servants vanish shortly afterwards.

Sieg and Astolfo, being the winners of the war, talk to the Grail's avatar Justeaze Lizrich von Einzbern, who explains Shirō's wish will occur, but it will prevent humanity from evolving. Sieg requests that he be transformed into Fafnir. After the war, Astolfo sets off to explore the world. Sometime later, Jeanne's spirit reunites with Sieg, confessing their love as they began a new journey together.

== Characters ==
Sieg (ジーク, Jīku)
Voiced by: Natsuki Hanae (Japanese); Zach Aguilar (English)
He is introduced as a nameless homunculus, one of many Gordes Musik Yggdmillennia created to serve the unified clan. He possesses unexpected high-quality Magic Circuits, Sieg escapes his confinement and gets rescued by Astolfo with him hiding Sieg in his chamber. As Gordes and Siegfried are hunting him down, Sieg is mortally wounded and Siegfried gives him his heart to revive him. Although Jeanne gives him the opportunity to live a new life, Sieg becomes compelled to grant freedom to his fellow homunculi, joining the Greater Grail War and becoming Astolfo's master after Yggdmillennia is killed. Through Siegfried's heart, Sieg can temporarily transform into the Germanic hero, gaining his powers and Noble Phantasm. He further gains the ability to use the powers of Frankenstein's Monster after the lightning her suicide attack releases revives him. He also develops a romantic bond with Jeanne. Sieg and Astolfo ultimately win the Grail War, with Sieg wishing to transform into the dragon Fafnir and carrying the Greater Grail to the reverse side of the world to prevent Amakusa's wish from happening. He remains there for some time before reuniting with Jeanne. In Fate/Grand Order, due to the mixture of Siegfried's and Berserker's powers and his high quality magic circuits, Sieg is classified as a Caster-class Demi-servant.
Ruler (ルーラー, Rūrā) – Jeanne d'Arc (ジャンヌ・ダルク, Jannu Daruku)
Voiced by: Maaya Sakamoto (Japanese); Erika Harlacher (English)
The spirit of the historical figure Jeanne d'Arc, who occupies the body of ordinary French high school student Laeticia (レティシア, Retishia), whose appearance is very similar to Jeanne, though classifying her as a Pseudo-Servant. Laeticia mostly remains within Jeanne's subconscious, but occasionally interacts with other characters. At first, Jeanne is unaware why she was summoned as Ruler beyond ensuring the Greater Grail War occurs fairly. However, over time she learns her true purpose is to stop Amakusa from hijacking the war to fulfil his own wish. Jeanne aids Sieg in starting a new life, but has visions that he will join the war despite her attempts to prevent it. She falls in love with Sieg, but at first assumes these feelings belong to Laeticia. Jeanne is courageous, compassionate, humble, and honest, disbelieving that she is a holy maiden as she was canonized as. As Ruler-class, Jeanne can command other Servants using Command Spells. Jeanne has two Noble Phantasms, "Luminosité Eternelle", her military flag, which can repel enemy attacks; and "La Pucelle", which manifests the flames that killed her. Jeanne sacrifices herself in the final chapters of Fate/Apocrypha, whilst Laeticia is spared. Her spirit later reunites with Sieg in the reverse side of the world. In Fate/Grand Order, Jeanne appears in Orleans as both an ally and antagonist, as the real Jeanne goes into conflict with her Avenger-Class Alter self, who became Orleans' demonic ruler. Alter-Jeanne also appears in other Singularities and Lostbelts as a recurring ally.
Rider of Black ("黒"のライダー, "Kuro" no Raidā) – Astolfo (アストルフォ, Asutorufo)
Voiced by: Rumi Ōkubo (Japanese); Faye Mata (English)
Yggdmillennia's Servant and one of the Twelve Paladins of Charlemagne, who is androgynous in appearance. He is upbeat and optimistic, but also confident, courageous, and lacks caution, related to his mythical flight to the Moon. He finds his initial master, Celenike, to be unpleasant, and soon befriends Sieg, becoming Sieg's Servant after Mordred decapitates Celenike. Astolfo possesses four Noble Phantasms, including a hippogriff which serves as his mount, "La Black Luna", a large hunting horn that emits sound blasts, the golden lance "Trap of Argalia", and "Casseur de Logistille", a spellbook that allows Astolfo to overcome most forms of magecraft. Astolfo later becomes the last surviving Servant in the war, with Sieg tasking him to help out the world as he sees fit. Astolfo also appears in Fate/Grand Order as a recurring part-time servant in Chaldea, with his recent assistance in Agartha.
Kairi Shishigou (獅子劫界離, Shishigō Kairi)
Voiced by: Kenji Nomura (Japanese); Patrick Seitz (English)
Saber of Red's Master, who is confident and pragmatic. He is a freelance necromancer who the Clock Tower hired to act as the seventh Master of Red, Shishigou is a confident, pragmatic man. In the past, Shishigou's ancestor made a deal to acquire the family's necromancing trait, but his bloodline was marked with a curse, making it difficult to reproduce. Shishigou adopted a daughter, but his attempt to transfer his Magic Crest to her led to her death, which he seeks to use the Holy Grail to undo. He gets along well with Mordred, with them acting independently from the rest of the Red faction. They side with Ruler, Sieg, and the remaining Black Masters to defeat Amakusa after he is revealed to be manipulating the war for his own benefit. Shishigou and Mordred defeat Semiramis, but Shishigou dies from his wounds. Kairi also appears in the Case Files of Lord El-Melloi, as a supporting character.
Saber of Red ("赤"のセイバー, "Aka" no Seibā) – Mordred (モードレッド, Mōdoreddo)
Voiced by: Miyuki Sawashiro (Japanese); Erica Lindbeck (English)
Kairi Shishigou's Servant. She is known as the Knight of Treachery, and is the homunculus daughter of Artoria Pendragon and her sister Morgan le Fay. She appeared in Fate/stay night and Fate/Zero in flashbacks, but her face was not revealed until her appearance in Apocrypha. She has a good relationship with her Master and wishes to use the Grail to challenge her right to be King of Camelot and have her father's recognition as her heir. Artoria had previously slayed her, but not before she mortally wounded her father, leading to Artoria's ascension as a Heroic Spirit. Mordred is prideful, haughty, confident, and dislikes being addressed as a woman. She has two Noble Phantasms; her armor "Secret of Pedigree", which hides her identity from detection, and her magic sword "Clarent Blood Arthur", which fires destructive energy blasts. Mordred and Shishigou side with the surviving Yggdmillennia Masters and Jeanne to defeat Amakusa and fight and defeat Semiramis, but Mordred fades away after Shishigou dies from his wounds. In Fate/Grand Order, Mordred appears in London as an ally and guide to Ritsuka Fujimaru and Mash Kyrielight and would later be a recurring ally on other lostbelts assisting in SIN and Atlantis. An alternate version of Mordred where she never had a tumultuous relationship with Artoria appears in Camelot as an antagonist.
Ruler (ルーラー, Rūrā) – Shirou Kotomine (シロウ・コトミネ, Shirō Kotomine)
Voiced by: Kōki Uchiyama (Japanese); Max Mittelman (English)
A compassionate and virtuous member of the Holy Church who oversees the conflict between the Red and Black Factions as Semiramis's Master. His true identity is an incarnated Heroic Spirit named Amakusa Shirou Tokisada (天草 四郎 時貞, Amakusa Shirō Tokisada), a Japanese Christian who died leading the Shimabara Rebellion during the Edo period. In contrast to Angra Mainyu in the Fate/Stay Night timeline, the Einzberns summoned Shirou as a Ruler-class servant during the Third Holy Grail War and acquired a physical body before Darnic took the Greater Grail. Shirou exploits the conflict while manipulating the other Masters of Red, except for Shishigou, into transferring their Command Spells and Servants to him. After his faction acquires the Greater Grail ad the number of sacrifices for activation, Shirou makes his wish to turn all souls of humanity into immortal beings of conscience in bliss and free of sin using the Third Magic. While his wish is granted, Sieg fatally wounds him and Semiramis finishing him off with a poisoned kiss. Sieg prevents Shirou's wish from taking full effect by having the Grail grant his own wish to become Fafnir and carry it to the Reverse Side of the World, where no humans exist for the Grail to affect. Still a Heroic Spirit, Shirou possesses Noble Phantasms that include a replica of his katana that Shakespeare conjured and markings on his arms that allow him to perform miracles and use all types of magic.

=== Black faction ===
==== Servants ====
Saber of Black ("黒"のセイバー, "Kuro" no Seibā) – Siegfried (ジークフリート, Jīkufurīdo)
Voiced by: Junichi Suwabe (Japanese); Ben Pronsky (English)
Yggdmillennia's Servant, who is known as the Dragon-Blooded Knight. Siegfried appears in the Nibelungenlied as a heroic figure who killed the dragon Fafnir, bathing in his blood and becoming immortal. However, a lone linden tree leaf covered a part of his back, leaving a weak spot that ultimately caused his death. After Gordes summons him, Siegfried is forbidden from speaking his true name to others, and silently obeys Gordes' orders. After Gordes mortally wounds Sieg, Siegfried removes his own heart and gives it to him, becoming the first Servant to die in the Greater Grail War. Sieg is able to transform into Siegfried for a limited time. He has two Noble Phantasms, his sword "Balmung", which emits energy waves, and "Armor of Fafnir", making his skin invulnerable to most attacks. In Fate/Grand Order, Siegfried appears in Orleans, with Jeanne and Ritsuka having rescued her, and recruits him to counter Fafnir, Alter Jeanne's main Wyvern.
Archer of Black ("黒"のアーチャー, "Kuro" no Āchā) – Chiron (ケイローン, Keirōn)
Voiced by: Shunsuke Takeuchi (Japanese); Jalen K. Cassell (English)
Fiore Forvedge Yggdmillennia's Servant. He is a Greek hero and centaur who appears as a human to hide his identity. He is calm, wise, and loyal and serves Fiore well, but convinces Caules that his sister does not have the fortitude to be a mage. Chiron's wish is to regain his lost immortality. Achilles, who is Rider of Red, was one of Chiron's pupils, and they share a combative rivalry. Chiron and Astolfo remain the final Servants of Black to participate in the battle against the Red faction. Chiron is ultimately defeated in a duel with Achilles, but uses his Noble Phantasm "Antares Snipe" to remove Achilles' immortality with a celestial arrow.
Lancer of Black ("黒"のランサー, "Kuro" no Ransā) – Vlad III (ヴラド三世, Vurado Sansei)
Voiced by: Ryōtarō Okiayu (Japanese); Ray Chase (English)
Darnic Prestone Yggdmillennia's servant and leader of the Servants of Black. He is a Romanian warlord and hero who wishes to rebuild his kingdom and erase the stain that Count Dracula made upon his family's reputation. He is intimidating, yet charismatic and modest leader, who dislikes Darnic's excessive flattery. Due to being in his old domain of Romania, Vlad's abilities are boosted, but he weakens after moving the battle to the Hanging Gardens of Babylon. Vlad has two Noble Phantasms, "Kazikli Bay", which creates endless stakes to impale enemies, and "Legend of Dracula", which transforms him into the mythical vampire he despises. Vlad refuses to acknowledge or use his second Noble Phantasm, but Darnic forces him to; he then imprints his soul onto Vlad, turning them into a vicious monster obsessed with acquiring the Greater Grail. Amakusa later slays them both using holy lances. In Fate/Grand Order, Vlad appears in Okeanos as an antagonist as one of the Beserker servants Alter Jeanne summons.
Berserker of Black ("黒"のバーサーカー, "Kuro" no Bāsākā) – Frankenstein's monster (フランケンシュタインの怪物, Furankenshutain no Kaibutsu)
Voiced by: Ai Nonaka (Japanese); Sarah Anne Williams (English)
Caules Forvedge Yggdmillennia's Servant. She is depicted as a female creation of Victor Frankenstein who he rejected after she requested he create a mate for her; therefore, her wish is to have a mate. As Caules' Servant, she rejects her true name, preferring to be addressed as "Berserker". She often speaks through grunts, but is capable of speech. She is gentle and enjoys picking flowers, but can also be aggressive. She has two Noble Phantasms, "Bridal Chest", an electrical war hammer, and "Blasted Tree", a powerful surge of lightning that will cause her to self-destruct if used at full power. According to her blueprints by Victor Frankenstein, "This lightning attack is not simply lightning, but rather a power that has Frankenstein's will imbedded within it. As long as it exists, she will never perish." She attempts to kill Mordred with Blasted Tree, but is destroyed; however, she channels part of her essence into Sieg, reviving him and allowing him to use a weakened version of it during his battle with Amakusa. In Fate/Grand Order, Berserker appears in London as an ally and part of Mordred's team of servants.
Caster of Black ("黒"のキャスター, "Kuro" no Kyasutā) – Avicebron (アヴィケブロン, Avikeburon)
Voiced by: Mitsuru Miyamoto (Japanese); Cam Clarke (English)
Roche Frain Yggdmillennia's Servant. A 12th century philosopher who, in the Fate universe, founded the thaumaturgical system Kabbalah and is the second Servant Yggdmillennia summons. Due to his hatred for humanity, Avicebron sports a featureless mask, claiming he finds looking people in the eye painful. He, along with Roche, build large golems for Yggdmillennia. His Noble Phantasm, "Golem Keter Malkuth", is a gigantic sentient golem that requires a terminal core to power; this core is actually a human host with receptive Magical Circuits. Avicebron sides with Amakusa, sacrificing Roche to activate his Noble Phantasm. Chiron kills Avicebron, who further bonds with his Golem Keter Malkuth and uses its power in an attempt to create Eden on Earth, but Sieg and Mordred destroy it. In Fate/Grand Order, Chaldea summons Avicebron as an ally in the Russian Lostbelt Anastasia. Unlike other servants, who have no memories of the greater grail war after being summoned, Avicebron seems to recall his sacrificing of Roche and has harbored guilt ever since. He later redeems himself by sacrificing himself to become the core for his Golem Keter Malkuth so Chaldea can battle Ivan the Terrible.
Assassin of Black ("黒"のアサシン, "Kuro" no Asashin) – Jack the Ripper (ジャック・ザ・リッパー, Jakku za Rippā)
Voiced by: Sakura Tange (Japanese); Erica Mendez (English)
Reika Rikudou's child-like Servant, who imprinted on her as a mother-figure, acting on her own whims to kill indiscriminately as a wild card during the conflict. Jack is actually a amalgamation of the souls of deceased children that died tragically or never got to live as a result of Whitechapel's poor living conditions. Jack became a contributing factor in the serial killer's legend before the Mage's Association destroyed her. However, Yggdmillenia member Hyouma Sagara summoned her as a heroic spirit through a forbidden ritual, and she murdered him after he offered Reika as a sacrifice. Due to Reika being a normal human, Jack replenishes her mana by eating the hearts of mages that she kills. Due to the nature of her identity, those who encounter Jack forget what she looks like. She has two Noble Phantasms, one emitting an ominous, toxic fog, and the other, "Maria the Ripper", allowing her to replicate her infamous murders, and can materialize her knives within female victims. After Atalanta shoots and kills Reika, Jack creates an illusion of Victorian London to torment the archer while attempting to gain sympathy from Sieg and Jeanne. However. Jeanne sees through Jack and convinces her collective souls to pass on to the afterlife, through traces of Jack's being latch on to Atalanta and exploit her ideals to corrupt her. A different version of Jack the Ripper appears in Fate/strange fake as the Berserker-class servant of Flat Escardos in the False Holy Grail War with an anonymous appearance.

==== Masters ====
Darnic Prestone Yggdmillennia (ダーニック・プレストーン・ユグドミレニア, Dānikku Puresutōn Yugudomirenia)
Voiced by: Nobuyuki Hiyama (Japanese); Benjamin Diskin (English)
Lancer of Black's Master and the leader of the Yggdmillennia group, who most of the mage community ostracized for impurities in the Prestone bloodline. He participated in the Third Holy Grail War with Fionn mac Cumhaill as his Lancer-class Servant, exploiting Nazi Germany to seize the Holy Grail. Using a forbidden means of prolonging his life by feeding on the souls of children, which transforms him into another person, Darnic takes action sixty years later, partaking in another Holy Grail War to achieve his wish for the Prestone clan's survival. This desire motivates Darnic to force Vlad's transformation into Dracula and then possess his Servant's body after being killed to reclaim the stolen Holy Grail, only for Shirou to incinerate his vessel. Fate/Grand Order reveals that Darnic's soul was trapped within the Holy Grail upon Dracula's demise, repeating the conflict that caused his death before finally finding peace.
Gordes Musik Yggdmillennia (ゴルド・ムジーク・ユグドミレニア, Gorudo Mujīku Yugudomirenia)
Voiced by: Toru Ohkawa (Japanese); Brad Venable (English)
Saber of Black's Master and a First-Class Alchemist. He is pompous and proud, and created the many homunculi that serve Yggdmillennia. His high-handed command of Siegfried causes him to waste two of his Command Spells early on, and is left without a Servant when Siegfried kills himself to save Sieg. Gordes survives the war, and afterward is encouraged to treat his homunculi as individuals, with his assistant Toole aiding him.
Fiore Forvedge Yggdmillennia (フィオレ・フォルヴェッジ・ユグドミレニア, Fiore Foruvejji Yugudomirenia)
Voiced by: Chinatsu Akasaki (Japanese); Kayli Mills (English)
Archer of Black's Master, Caules' older sister, and a magus with great talent, who is well versed in spiritual evocation and human engineering. She is kind and compassionate, but despite often putting up a hard exterior, lacks the often cold demeanor needed to be a mage. She has used a wheelchair since birth and wishes to have the Grail to heal her legs while keeping her magus abilities, something which would otherwise be impossible. Fiore uses Bronze Link Manipulators, which appear as four mechanical, weaponized limbs and allow her to walk and scale buildings. Caules and Chiron eventually convince her to retire as a mage due to her inability to kill. She transfers her Magic Circuits to Caules, making him head of Yggdmillennia. In the epilogue, Fiore is seen undergoing physical therapy to learn how to walk.
Caules Forvedge Yggdmillennia (カウレス・フォルヴェッジ・ユグドミレニア, Kauresu Foruvejji Yugudomirenia)
Voiced by: Yūsuke Kobayashi (Japanese); Tom Bauer (English)
Berserker of Black's Master and a magus who can summon low-class spirits, insects and animals. He is Fiore's younger brother and is greatly devoted to her. Though positioned as a "spare" to her, he possesses minimum magic abilities. Because he lacks a personal wish for the Holy Grail, he decides to use his wish on Fiore. He has a close partnership with Berserker, treating her with respect and trust, and is reluctant to allow her to use her destructive Noble Phantasm. He convinces Fiore to step down as both a mage and as head of Yggdmillennia, and has her transfer her Magic to him. In the epilogue, Calus becomes a student under Lord El-Melloi II after the surviving Yggdmillennia members are forgiven for their role in the conflict.
Celenike Icecolle Yggdmillennia (セレニケ・アイスコル・ユグドミレニア, Serenike Aisukoru Yugudomirenia)
Voiced by: Shizuka Ishigami (Japanese); Lauren Landa (English)
Rider of Black's Master and a dark arts practitioner with a dominatrix personality. She summoned Astolfo to torture and violate him, though her desires bore him. Due to Astolfo's increasing concern for Sieg, Celenike vows to kill Sieg, confronting them after they battle Mordred. Celenike uses her Command Spells to have Astolfo murder Sieg, but Mordred then decapitates her.
Roche Frain Yggdmillennia (ロシェ・フレイン・ユグドミレニア, Roshe Furein Yugudomirenia)
Voiced by: Emiri Katō (Japanese); Erica Mendez (English)
Caster of Black's Master and a prodigy magus who creates golems with his Servant, who he regards as his teacher. He is obsessed with his practice and prefers golems to people, regarding them with little concern. He idolizes Avicebron, hoping they can create his own golems together. However, Aviceborn betrays Roche, using him as the terminal core for Adam.
Reika Rikudou (六導玲霞, Rikudō Reika)
Voiced by: Mai Nakahara (Japanese); Allegra Clark (English)
Assassin of Black's Master, who work as a prostitute. Because she has no talent as a magus, she has Jack devour violent criminals to supply her with energy. She is kind and motherly towards Jack, allowing her to kill criminals and mages to devour their hearts. Sagara Hyouma attempts to sacrifice her to summon Assassin of Black, but Jack instead kills him and identifies Reika as her master and parental figure. She is later shot in the chest by Atalante, using her Command Spells to ensure that Jack is spared.

=== Red faction ===
==== Servants ====
Archer of Red ("赤"のアーチャー, "Aka" no Āchā) – Atalanta (アタランテ, Atarante)
Voiced by: Saori Hayami (Japanese); Allegra Clark (English)
Originally Rottweil Berzinsky's Servant and later Shirou Kotomine's Servant. She is a Greek heroine and archer raised by Artemis who seeks the Holy Grail to grant her wish for the children in the world to be loved and protected. However, after being corrupted by the lingering remains of Jack the Ripper, Atlanta vows to kill Jeanne when she exorcises the Assassin, to the point of destroying her identity. However, Achilles stops her from attacking Jeanne and manages to restore her original mindset despite the two ultimately killing each other. As she is dying, she admits her dream was unrealistic, but still wished to pursue it. She has two Noble Phantasms; "Phoebus Catastrophe", which unleashes a volley of divine arrows blessed by Artemis and Apollo, and "Agrius Metamorphosis", the pelt of the Calydonian Boar, which turns Atalanta into a monstrous Berserker-type Servant called Atalanta Alter (アタランテ 〔オルタ〕, Atarante (Aruta)). In Fate/Grand Order, Atalanta appears in Orleans as an antagonist, with Alter Jeanne summoning her and, alongside Gilles, brainwashing her into her Alter version as her slave. After Ritsuka and Mash defeat and free her, she reappears in Okeanos as an ally.
Lancer of Red ("赤"のランサー, "Aka" no Ransā) – Karna (カルナ, Karuna)
Voiced by: Kōji Yusa (Japanese); Chris Niosi (English)
Originally Feend vor Sembren's Servant and later Shirou Kotomine's Servant. He is an Indian demigod appearing in the Mahabharata, famous for his indomitable will and archery. Karna appears as a white-haired, pale-skinned man wearing golden armor. Though portrayed as cold and aloof, Karna is loyal to his Master, Feend vor Sembren, who he never meets in the story, and obeys Amakusa's orders without question. He is first assigned to assassinate Jeanne, but Siegfried stops them and they promise to have a lengthier duel at another time. During the final battle, Karna asks Caules to remove the other Masters of Red from the Hanging Gardens of Babylon. Karna and Sieg duel, with Astolfo using Achilles' Noble Phantasm to assist in Karna's defeat. After being defeated, Karna expresses no regrets or grudges towards Sieg, and Astolfo praises him for keeping his pride as a Servant. Karna has three Noble Phantasms; "Kavacha and Kundala", his nigh invulnerable armor and earring, the explosive projectile "Brahmastra Kundala", and the holy spear "Vasavi Shakti", which draws its power from the Sun.
Rider of Red ("赤"のライダー, "Aka" no Raidā) – Achilles (アキレウス, Akireusu)
Voiced by: Makoto Furukawa (Japanese); Joe Zieja (English)
Originally Cabik Pentel's Servant and later Shirou Kotomine's Servant. He is an immortal Greek hero who Chiron taught how to be a hero, with both reuniting on the battlefield as enemies. He is portrayed as heroic, confident, and noble. After defeating Chiron in a fist fight, Achilles loses his immortality when Chiron's Noble Phantasm strikes his heel. After giving one of his Noble Phantasms to Astolfo, Achilles battles Atalanta, and both die of mortal wounds. Achilles has multiple Noble Phantasms, including his chariot "Troias Tragōidia", and the shield "Akhilleus Kosmos", which summons a miniature replica of a colosseum that blocks attacks.
Caster of Red ("赤"のキャスター, "Aka" no Kyasutā) – William Shakespeare (ウィリアム・シェイクスピア, U~Iriamu Sheikusupia)
Voiced by: Tetsu Inada (Japanese); Keith Silverstein (English)
Originally Jean Rum's servant and later Shirou Kotomine's Servant. An eccentric, theatrical, but manipulative Servant, who bamboozles his fellow Servants with his dramatic phrasing and often quotes his own plays. He intentionally takes on a supporting role in the Greater Grail War to write a play about the other Servants and Masters, though Shirou places a command forbidding him from writing a tragedy about Shirou's efforts. He becomes the last surviving Servant of Red and witnesses Sieg removing the Greater Grail, expressing regret that he could not be the hero of his own tale. His Noble Phantasm, "First Folio", allows him to create elaborate illusions based on an individual's past.
Assassin of Red ("赤"のアサシン, "Aka" no Asashin) – Semiramis (セミラミス, Semiramisu)
Voiced by: Kei Shindō (Japanese); Allegra Clark (English)
Shirou Kotomine's Servant, a demigoddess who wields poison and magic despite not being a Caster-class. She is loyal to Shirou, being his co-conspirator in his plans, and is implied to be in love with him. She is commanding and dominating, but prone to anger if defied or questioned. Semiramis has two Noble Phantasms; the Hanging Gardens of Babylon, which serves as the Servants of Red's headquarters after Shirou's true colors are revealed, and "Sikera Ušum", which allows her to turn an environment poisonous. Though Mordred defeats her, Semiramis lives long enough to grant Shirou a painless death through a poisoned kiss.
Berserker of Red ("赤"のバーサーカー, "Aka" no Bāsākā) – Spartacus (スパルタクス, Suparutakusu)
Voiced by: Satoshi Tsuruoka (Japanese); Josh Tomar (English)
Originally Diemlet Pentel's Servant and later Caster of Black's Servant when he is captured. He is known as the Spirit of Rebellion and takes great joy in battle, and rebels and fights against all forms of "oppression". Shakespeare sends Spartacus to attack Yggdmillennia, but the enemy captures him and brainwashes him into becoming Avicebron's Servant. His Noble Phantasm is "Crying Warmonger", which increases his power as he takes damage before eventually killing him from overuse.

==== Masters ====
Jean Rum (ジーン・ラム, Jīn Ramu)
She is the original Master of Caster of Red and is highly skilled in wind element magic.
Rottweil Berzinsky (ロットウェル・ペルジンスキー, Rottoweru Perujinsukī)
He is the original Master of Archer of Red and is a magus-for-hire.
Feend vor Sembren (フィーンド・ヴォル・センベルン, Fīndo voru Senberun)
He is the original Master of Lancer of Red and a professor at the clocktower.
Cabik Pentel (キャビィク・ペンテル, Kyabīku Penteru)
He is the original Master of Rider of Red and is the younger Gum Brother.
Deimlet Pentel (デムライト・ペンテル, Demuraito Penteru)
He is the original Master of Berserker of Red and is the older Gum Brother.

== Media ==
=== Light novels ===
Fate/Apocrypha is written by Yūichirō Higashide and illustrated by Ototsugu Konoe. Fate/Apocrypha was originally introduced as a canceled project for an online game, with various details and character designs by various artists collected in Fate/complete material IV Extra material. In November 2011, it was announced as a new project called Fate/Apocrypha, and in early December, Higashide confirmed on Twitter that he is writing Fate/Apocrypha as a light novel. On December 15, 2011, in the seventh volume of Type-Moon Ace magazine, it was first published as a short story penned by Higashide as the first chapter. Although some story elements were present, the short story itself has no relation to the final version of the story presented in the novels. The original planned number of books was four, but Higashide later confirmed that the story was eventually extended to five books. The defunct original online game project has since been rebooted as Fate/Grand Order.

No.	Title	Release date	ISBN
1	Gaiten: Seihai Taisen 外典：聖杯大戦	December 29, 2012; September 25, 2019 (Kadokawa Bunko edition)	978-4-04-108534-9
2	Kuro no Rinbu / Aka no Saiten 黒の輪舞/赤の祭典	August 16, 2013; November 25, 2019 (Kadokawa Bunko edition)	978-4-04-108535-6
3	Seijin no Gaisen 聖人の凱旋	December 29, 2013; January 25, 2020 (Kadokawa Bunko edition)	978-4-04-108536-3
4	Shiten no Hai 熾天の杯	May 30, 2014; February 25, 2020 (Kadokawa Bunko edition)	978-4-04-108537-0
5	Jaryū to Seijo 邪竜と聖女	December 28, 2014; March 25, 2020 (Kadokawa Bunko edition)	978-4-04-108538-7

=== Manga ===
A manga adaptation, illustrated by Akira Ishida, was serialized in Kadokawa Shoten's Comp Ace magazine from the August 2016 issue sold on June 25, to the June 2024 issue sold on April 26, and compiled into sixteen volumes.

No.	Release date	ISBN
1	August 26, 2016	978-4-04-104684-5
2	January 26, 2017	978-4-04-105220-4
3	June 24, 2017	978-4-04-105765-0
4	October 24, 2017	978-4-04-106099-5
5	January 26, 2018	978-4-04-106487-0
6	July 26, 2018	978-4-04-107166-3
7	February 26, 2019	978-4-04-107811-2
8	November 26, 2019	978-4-04-108687-2
9	October 24, 2020	978-4-04-108690-2
10	July 26, 2021	978-4-04-111676-0
11	September 25, 2021	978-4-04-111677-7
12	March 26, 2022	978-4-04-111678-4
13	September 26, 2022	978-4-04-112945-6
14	March 25, 2023	978-4-04-112946-3
15	October 26, 2023	978-4-04-113945-5
16	June 25, 2024	978-4-04-113946-2

=== Anime ===
An anime television series, directed by Yoshiyuki Asai and produced by A-1 Pictures, aired from July 2 to December 30, 2017, on Tokyo MX and other channels. The series ran for 25 episodes. Yūichirō Higashide wrote the scripts, Yūkei Yamada designed the characters, and Masaru Yokoyama composed the music. The series is streamed on Netflix in Japan. The first twelve episodes of the series began streaming on Netflix outside of Japan on November 7, 2017. Aniplex of America later released the series on Blu-ray in two sets on November 20, 2018, and February 12, 2019, with a full English dub. Madman Entertainment acquired the series for a home video release in Australia and New Zealand, and MVM Entertainment acquired the series for a home video release in the UK and Ireland.

=== Music ===
From episodes 1–12, the first opening theme is "Eiyū: Unmei no Uta" (英雄 運命の詩; "Heroes: Song of Fate") by Egoist while the ending theme is "Désir" (Desire) by Garnidelia. From episodes 13 onwards, the second opening theme is "Ash" by LiSA while the ending theme is "Koe" by Asca. The series' soundtrack, consisting of two CDs, was composed by Masaru Yokoyama.
