= The Irregular at Magic High School season 1 =

First season of The Irregular at Magic High School anime television series

The Irregular at Magic High School
- Season 1
- The cover of the first DVD compilation of the first season released by Aniplex of America.
- No. of episodes: 26

Release
- Original network: Tokyo MX
- Original release: April 6 – September 28, 2014

Season chronology
- Next → Season 2

The Irregular at Magic High School is an anime adaptation of a light novel series written by Tsutomu Satō. The 26-episode series aired from April 6, 2014, to September 28, 2014. It is directed by Manabu Ono and animated by Madhouse.

The series uses four pieces of theme music: two opening themes and two ending themes. The first opening theme is "Rising Hope" by LiSA while the first ending theme is "Millenario." by Elisa. The second opening theme is "Grilleto" by Garnidelia while the second ending theme is "Mirror" by Rei Yasuda.

== Episodes ==
No. overall	No. in season	Title	Directed by	Written by	Storyboarded by	Original release date	Ref.
1	1	"Enrollment Part I"; Transliteration: "Nyūgaku-hen I" (Japanese: 入学編I)	Masaki Matsumura	Yukie Sugawara	Manabu Ono	April 6, 2014	
In 2095, Tatsuya Shiba and his sister Miyuki enroll at the First Private Magic University Affiliated High School, but due to the difference in their grades in the practical exam, Miyuki is placed in the Course 1 curriculum with the other students who have demonstrated high magical skills, (informally known as "Blooms") while Tatsuya, on the other hand, having scored poorly on the practical exam is assigned to the Course 2 curriculum (insultingly called "Weeds" by Course 1 students) even though he placed first in the theoretical exam. Tatsuya becomes acquainted with several Course 2 students including Erika Chiba, Leo Saijo and Mizuki Shibata. The chasm between the Weeds and Blooms leads to a confrontation when a number of Miyuki's classmates object to her hanging around with her brother and his new friends. Violence seems imminent but the magic sequence is disrupted by the student council president as she arrives with the chairman of the disciplinary committee.
2	2	"Enrollment Part II"; Transliteration: "Nyūgaku-hen II" (Japanese: 入学編II)	Sadanori Kaneda	Yukito Kizawa	Koji Iwai	April 13, 2014	
Tatsuya's skills and wits have earned him and his sister the scrutiny of Mayumi Saegusa, Student Council president and Mari Watanabe, leader of the Public Morals Committee. Mayumi invites Miyuki to join the Student Council as the first year representative, but she initially declines and puts her brother's name forward. Upon learning that by school regulation, year representatives must be Course 1 students, she accepts. Not wanting to waste his talents, Mari proposes that Tatsuya be the Student Council's nominee for a vacant position on the Public Morals Committee, to which President Saegusa agrees. At a meeting later that day, Student Council vice-president Hanzo Gyoubushoujo Hattori opposes Tatsuya's nomination, which prompts Miyuki to defend him. Hanzo reprimands her for her seeming bias towards her brother, which causes Tatsuya to challenge him to a magic duel. Tatsuya easily defeats Hanzo, much to the surprise of the Student Council.
3	3	"Enrollment Part III"; Transliteration: "Nyūgaku-hen III" (Japanese: 入学編III)	Tamaki Nakatsu	Muneo Nakamoto	Yuuji Kumazawa	April 20, 2014	
The Council cannot reconcile Tatsuya's flawless victory in his duel with Hanzo with his poor showing in the practical exam. Once he regains consciousness, Hanzo tacitly withdraws his objection to Tatsuya's nomination by apologizing to Miyuki. Mari introduces Tatsuya to the other members of the Public Morals Committee, who note the fact that he's a Course 2 student, but warmly welcome him on learning of his victory over the previously undefeated Hanzo. To his dismay, Mari informs Tatsuya that Shun Morisaki, the Course 1 student who started the altercation on their first day, is also joining the Committee on a faculty recommendation. His first taste of action involves a confrontation between the Kendo Club and Kenjutsu Club. The head of the Kenjutsu Club, who combines magic with swordplay, forces Sayaka Mibu, a member of the kendo club and Weed, to spar. When he loses, he uses magic in a follow-up attack, in contravention of the rules. Tatsuya steps in and arrests him, but is assaulted by the rest of the Kenjutsu Club who refuse to acknowledge his authority just because he is a Weed.
4	4	"Enrollment Part IV"; Transliteration: "Nyūgaku-hen IV" (Japanese: 入学編IV)	Shūji Miyazaki	Yukie Sugawara	Shuuji Miyazaki	April 27, 2014	
Tatsuya is approached by Sayaka Mibu, who wants his cooperation in a plan to put an end to the discrimination between the Blooms and Weeds at the school. He refrains from giving an immediate answer. His suspicions that she is being manipulated by someone else with ulterior motives are aroused when she is unable to give him proper answers to his questions.
5	5	"Enrollment Part V"; Transliteration: "Nyūgaku-hen V" (Japanese: 入学編V)	Eiichi Kuboyama	Yukito Kizawa	Kenichi Kawamura	May 4, 2014	
Tatsuya rejects Sayaka's offer, and a group of Weeds led by her lock themselves in the broadcast room, creating a commotion at school. Mayumi elects to listen to their demands and discuss them in front of the student body. Debating the school's position by herself, she is about to arrange a compromise with the Weeds when the school gets suddenly attacked by terrorists.
6	6	"Enrollment Part VI"; Transliteration: "Nyūgaku-hen VI" (Japanese: 入学編VI)	Jun Fukuda	Yukito Kizawa	Hiroyuki Shimazu	May 11, 2014	
The Student Council and Public Morals Committee defeat the terrorists and find out that the attack was merely a cover for an information raid on the school's computer library. Tatsuya and his friends are tasked with countering the raid. They defeat the terrorists, including Sayaka, and take them into custody. After learning of Sayaka's reasons for cooperating with Blanche, the terrorist organization behind the attack, Tatsuya decides to attack the enemy hideout in order to help clear her name and strike back at them for using her and invading the school.
7	7	"Enrollment Part VII"; Transliteration: "Nyūgaku-hen VII" (Japanese: 入学編VII)	Risako Yoshida	Yukito Kizawa	Risako Yoshida	May 18, 2014	
Tatsuya and his friends storm Blanche's hideout where they confront the group's leader, who confirms that he had manipulated Sayaka's memory to attack the school. Despite a number of traps, the students are able to subdue the terrorists with no apparent injuries. After Sayaka is discharged from the hospital, Tatsuya and Miyuki's normal school life resumes.
8	8	"Nine Schools Competition Part I"; Transliteration: "Kyūkōsen-hen I" (Japanese: 九校戦編I)	Masaki Matsumura	Yukie Sugawara	Yuuji Kumazawa	May 25, 2014	
The inter-school sporting event known as the "Nine Schools Competition" is just around the corner, and Tatsuya, in recognition of his superior magic-tuning skills, is named to the engineering squad, over the objections of a number of Course 1 students. After school, Tatsuya surprises his sister when he presents her with a magic tool he developed that allows a person to fly, a feat that no one has never done before.
9	9	"Nine Schools Competition Part II"; Transliteration: "Kyūkōsen-hen II" (Japanese: 九校戦編II)	Sadanori Kaneda	Yukie Sugawara	Koji Iwai	June 1, 2014	
Tatsuya and Miyuki pay a visit to Four Leaves Technology, where Tatsuya unveils his flying CAD to Ushiyama, the other half of the genius magic engineer Taurus Silver. After a brief encounter with their father, the siblings set out for the Competition, but on the way there, a traffic accident occurs, putting the students in danger.
10	10	"Nine Schools Competition Part III"; Transliteration: "Kyūkōsen-hen III" (Japanese: 九校戦編III)	Tamaki Nakatsu	Yukie Sugawara	Naoyuki Itō	June 8, 2014	
Tatsuya, Miyuki, and Katsuto Jyumonji act to prevent the car from ramming into the bus. From traces that he is able to find, Tatsuya speculates that the incident was set up to look like a traffic accident but was instead a suicide attack. On arriving at their hotel, Tatsuya and Miyuki are surprised to find Erika and Mizuki present. The event opens with a banquet where the students from the nine competing schools mingle, unaware that unknown enemies are about to turn the competition topsy-turvy.
11	11	"Nine Schools Competition Part IV"; Transliteration: "Kyūkōsen-hen IV" (Japanese: 九校戦編IV)	Shūji Miyazaki	Yukie Sugawara	Shuuji Miyazaki	June 15, 2014	
The Nine Schools Competition begins, and Tatsuya uses his tuning skills to help his teammates' performance while remaining vigilant for further disturbances.
12	12	"Nine Schools Competition Part V"; Transliteration: "Kyūkōsen-hen V" (Japanese: 九校戦編V)	Michita Shiraishi	Muneo Nakamoto	Kenichi Kawamura	June 22, 2014	
Mari Watanabe, one of Tatsuya's team members, is involved in a serious accident during the competition, and the other students increase their vigilance after Saegusa, Mayumi, and Tatsuya reveal that she was actually a victim of sabotage.
13	13	"Nine Schools Competition Part VI"; Transliteration: "Kyūkōsen-hen VI" (Japanese: 九校戦編VI)	Ippei Yokota	Muneo Nakamoto	Hiroyuki Shimazu	June 29, 2014	
The "No Head Dragon", a criminal syndicate, is eager to interfere in the competition for the sake of their profits, and First High School is their main target. Meanwhile, the students under Tatsuya's care are doing better than expected in their events, drawing the attention of those who still can't acknowledge his talent just because he is a Course 2 student, including First High School's main rivals from Third High School.
14	14	"Nine Schools Competition Part VII"; Transliteration: "Kyūkōsen-hen VII" (Japanese: 九校戦編VII)	Risako Yoshida	Muneo Nakamoto	Risako Yoshida	July 6, 2014	
The Nine Schools Competition proceeds without further incident until the 1st High School Monolith Code's junior participants get seriously injured due to foul play. Appointed by Mayumi, Tatsuya is requested to compete and agrees to it after Juumonji's persuasion.
15	15	"Nine Schools Competition Part VIII"; Transliteration: "Kyūkōsen-hen VIII" (Japanese: 九校戦編VIII)	Masaki Matsumura	Yukito Kizawa	Masashi Kojima	July 13, 2014	
Tatsuya enters the competition with his friends Leonhard Saijo and Mikihiko Yoshida in the "Monolith Code" event. While watching out for No Head Dragon's interference, Tatsuya proceeds to win the match using his strategies, and they smoothly reach the final match against Third High School's geniuses, Crimson Prince Masaki and Cardinal George.
16	16	"Nine Schools Competition Part IX"; Transliteration: "Kyūkōsen-hen IX" (Japanese: 九校戦編IX)	Tamaki Nakatsu	Yukito Kizawa	Yuuji Kumazawa	July 20, 2014	
Tatsuya and Masaki's teams face off in the final match. Despite knowing that Masaki's abilities surpass his, Tatsuya confronts him head on, resulting in a spectacular duel. Making a critical mistake, Masaki breaks the rules by accidentally using a lethal attack on Tatsuya. Tatsuya takes the brunt of the attack and is seriously wounded. However, he uses his self-restoration to recover from his injuries, and while Masaki is still in a trance, Tatsuya incapacitates him with a point-blank ranged magic attack. Meanwhile, Mikihiko faces off against Cardinal George in a lengthy duel. Mikihiko finally defeats George but is on the verge of losing to the third member of Masaki's team when Leo manages to deliver the final blow, allowing First High to win the match.
17	17	"Nine Schools Competition Part X"; Transliteration: "Kyūkōsen-hen X" (Japanese: 九校戦編X)	Kuraya Ryōichi	Yukito Kizawa	Kenichi Kawamura	July 27, 2014	
Desperate with the recent developments, No Head Dragon start interfering with the competition directly, risking the lives of the players. A First High Mirage Bat participant ends up in an accident which causes her physical trauma and consequently the loss of her magical abilities. Tatsuya remains vigilant to stop further accidents and snaps when Miyuki's CAD is sabotaged in front of his eyes. After resolving the problem, Miyuki's Mirage Bat event starts, yet she has a hard time maintaining the lead. Miyuki requests her brother's permission to use Taurus Silver's fly magic sequence and wins the event with no critical mistakes.
18	18	"Nine Schools Competition Part XI"; Transliteration: "Kyūkōsen-hen XI" (Japanese: 九校戦編XI)	Shūji Miyazaki	Yukito Kizawa	Shuuji Miyazaki	August 3, 2014	
During Miyuki's event victory celebration, Tatsuya snipes the meeting of the No Head Dragon high-ranking members by casting his diassembly magic from an adjacent building. After learning the name of the organization's head, Richard Sun, Tatsuya proceeds to kill everyone present at the meeting, mostly influenced by his feelings for his sister. On the next day, the competition ends with Jyumonji single-handedly winning the Monolith Code event, confirming the championship for First High School. After Mayumi and Jyumonji discuss the long-term effects of Tatsuya's victory over Masaki (the probable future head of the Ten Master Clans), as the reputation of the Ten Master Clans could be tarnished, Jyumonji asks Tatsuya to join the Ten Master Clans by marrying Mayumi or one of her sisters.
19	19	"Yokohama Disturbance Part I"; Transliteration: "Yokohama Sōran-hen I" (Japanese: 横浜騒乱編I)	Ken'ichi Kawamura	Muneo Nakamoto	Kenichi Kawamura	August 10, 2014	
Following his feats in the Nine Schools Competition, Tatsuya is scouted to participate in another important event, the "Magic Thesis Competition," and his team has only eleven days to produce the applicable material before the deadline. Back at home, Tatsuya and Miyuki have an encounter with their stepmother, who enlists Tatsuya's help to replicate an elusive relic that can change the history of magic forever, but a new group of enemies appears, intending to steal it.
20	20	"Yokohama Disturbance Part II"; Transliteration: "Yokohama Sōran-hen II" (Japanese: 横浜騒乱編II)	Ippei Yokota	Muneo Nakamoto	Hiroyuki Shimazu	August 17, 2014	
While gathering the necessary material for the thesis, Tatsuya and his friends start their own investigation of those who are stalking him and were trying to hack him and his Four Leaves company.
21	21	"Yokohama Disturbance Part III"; Transliteration: "Yokohama Sōran-hen III" (Japanese: 横浜騒乱編III)	Risako Yoshida	Yukie Sugawara	Risako Yoshida	August 24, 2014	
The Magic Thesis Competition team has continued success in developing their project, though Erika, Mikihiko, and Leo apprehend a fleeing student, Chiaki Hirakawa, who is revealed to be working as a spy against the First High team. Chiaki admits to working against Tatsuya personally, passionately believing that he is responsible for Keiko Kobayakawa's accident during the Mirage Bat event of the Nine Schools Competition. Erika and Leo take a day off together to train Leo on how to use lethal magic, with Erika believing that the conflict will more likely escalate to lethal levels. Mikihiko chases after an embarrassed Mizuki, unintentionally bumping into an ominous figure dressed in a First High student uniform.
22	22	"Yokohama Disturbance Part IV"; Transliteration: "Yokohama Sōran-hen IV" (Japanese: 横浜騒乱編IV)	Kuraya Ryōichi	Yukie Sugawara	Masashi Kojima	August 31, 2014	
Lu Gonghu's attempt to remove Chiaki is thwarted by Watanabe and Naotsugu Chiba. Mr. Zhou visits Chiaki and appears to cast memory alteration magic so that she will forget about his involvement with her. Saegusa, Watanabe, and Tatsuya go to the detention facility and elicit a confession from Sekimoto on his intention (and unsuccessful attempt) to steal the Magic Thesis project data and locate the relic. Lu Gonghu appears again, apparently to silence Sekimoto, but is defeated by the three and taken into custody.
23	23	"Yokohama Disturbance Part V"; Transliteration: "Yokohama Sōran-hen V" (Japanese: 横浜騒乱編V)	Dai Seki	Yukie Sugawara	Hiroko Kazui	September 7, 2014	
Chen Xiangshan appeals to Mr. Zhou for help freeing Lu Gonghu. Under the condition that Chen promises to avoid Chinatown during his operation, Lu Gonghu is broken out. Ichihara visits Chioda and manipulates her to hold onto her feelings of bitterness for Tatsuya, believing that her capabilities will be important for First High's future. Further questioning reveals that Sekimoto was operating against the Magic Thesis team under mind control by an adversary organization. At the convention, Juumonji elects to increase security and have all Joint Security Force members wear bulletproof vests. The First High Magic Thesis team successfully delivers their presentation. Cardinal George congratulates Tatsuya backstage and claims that his school will defeat them. Before they can begin their presentation, however, the convention center is attacked.
24	24	"Yokohama Disturbance Part VI"; Transliteration: "Yokohama Sōran-hen VI" (Japanese: 横浜騒乱編VI)	Masaki Matsumura	Yukito Kizawa	Kenichi Kawamura	September 14, 2014	
The conventional joint defense forces engage the assaulting teams but are bogged down by slow progress evacuating the students; however, they discover that the attack is being launched from an unidentified disguised ship anchored in the harbor. Armed assailants storm the main hall but are easily countered by Tatsuya after he inspires the other students to fight back. Cardinal George confronts Tatsuya on using a top-secret technique used by STARS called Molecular Divider, but Tatsuya ignores him, saying that he doesn't have time to explain himself. Azusa casts a charm to calm everyone in the hall, and everyone starts to evacuate to an underground shelter via an emergency tunnel. Tatsuya's group leads the counterattack against the main terrorist force attacking the convention center. Shizuku uses her family's privilege to take the group to a VIP conference room so they can use the network to get a better idea on what's going on outside, then she meets with the rest of the First High student council members in the green room to discuss their next move. The group deduces that the enemy's motive is to raid the Magic Association's main database. Just as the group decides to evacuate to the shelter with everyone else, Major Kazama and Fujibayashi arrive and dispatche new orders to Tatsuya, revealing to everyone's great surprise that he is a JSDF special operative. Major Kazama tells everyone that this is confidential information and that his status must remain secret. Miyuki unlocks the seals on Tatsuya's powers and sends him to answer the JSDF's call to defend the city.
25	25	"Yokohama Disturbance Part VII"; Transliteration: "Yokohama Sōran-hen VII" (Japanese: 横浜騒乱編VII)	Tamaki Nakatsu	Yukito Kizawa	Akira Hayashi	September 21, 2014	
Crimson Prince brutally kills the terrorists while his allies prepare a bus for their escape aboveground. Meanwhile, evacuation underground continues through the tunnels despite resistance, and Mr. Tsuzura prevents a collapsed ceiling caused by the Great Asian Alliance's war machines. Mayumi and Shizuku call their fathers to send helicopters to evacuate the personnel who were unable to reach the bunker, and everyone is extracted. Tatsuya takes to the skies in the flight suit, which R&D had improved beyond his own design, and begins by destroying the attackers' recon drones. The battle for the city continues, with notable First High members and Crimson Prince repelling the attackers. During another group's escape, an ambush attack causes Kirihara's leg to be blown off and pierces Kei with shrapnel while he protects his girlfriend. Miyuki arrives, eliminating the attackers, and calls for Tatsuya, who uses his magic to restore both Kirihara and Kei before departing to support another area.
26	26	"Yokohama Disturbance Part VIII"; Transliteration: "Yokohama Sōran-hen VIII" (Japanese: 横浜騒乱編VIII)	Ippei Yokota, Risako Yoshida	Yukito Kizawa	Manabu Ono	September 28, 2014	
Tatsuya and his airborne comrades obliterate an enemy mechanized battalion. Some enemy soldiers recognize him as Mahesvara, a demon from three years ago who appeared for revenge when his sister and mother were critically injured. Meanwhile, Katsuto Jūmonji charismatically leads the magicians from Magic Branch Association, resulting in the enemy retreating. The Crimson Prince reaches the Chinatown of Zhou Gongjin and demands that he surrender the escapees, to which Zhou agrees and assures the Prince that he had also been victimized. The students in the Saegusa helicopter express curiosity about Tatsuya's magic, which healed Kei and Kirihara's wounds. Miyuki explains Tatsuya's magic Regrowth, as well as its price: the user has to endure the same pain as the person healed, in a condensed form. Later, they defeat Lu Gong-Hu and his employer at the branch of Magic Association building. The battle proceeds with the airborne troops and the magicians led by Jummonji, sandwiching the enemy on two sides, successfully obliterating most of the enemies. Some manage to escape to the camouflaged ship, though. Later, Major Kazama authorizes Tatsuya to activate Strategic Class Magic, Material Burst, which converts mass into energy. Tatsuya uses Material Burst on the retreating Great Asian Alliance's navy, completely annihilating them. He also casts Material Burst onto the Great Asian Alliance's departing Navy battalions and their harbor using satellite view, ending the war before it even began. The event is referred to as 'Scorched Halloween,' the day where magic is recognized as the strongest weapon, and magicians begin their era of glory and suffering. The episode ends with Maya Yotsuba inviting Kazama and the Shiba siblings to visit her on the same day, while Tatsuya hugs Miyuki on his return.
