= The Irregular at Magic High School: The Movie – The Girl Who Summons the Stars =

2017 Japanese animated film by Risako Yoshida

- Theatrical release poster
- Kanji: 劇場版 魔法科高校の劣等生 星を呼ぶ少女
- Revised Hepburn: Gekijōban Mahōka Kōkō no Rettōsei: Hoshi o Yobu Shōjo
- Directed by: Risako Yoshida
- Screenplay by: Tsutomu Satō; Muneo Nakamoto
- Story by: Tsutomu Satō
- Based on: The Irregular at Magic High School by Tsutomu Satō
- Produced by: Shinichiro Kashiwada; Kazuma Miki; Yasutaka Kimura; Kozue Kaneniwa
- Starring: Yūichi Nakamura; Saori Hayami; Yumi Uchiyama; Takuma Terashima; Satomi Satō; Atsushi Tamaru; Sora Amamiya; Yuiko Tatsumi; Kana Hanazawa; Marina Inoue; Junichi Suwabe; Yoko Hikasa; Konomi Kohara
- Cinematography: Yūki Kawashita
- Edited by: Kashiko Kimura
- Music by: Taku Iwasaki
- Production company: Eight Bit
- Distributed by: Aniplex
- Release dates: June 5, 2017 (Tokyo and Osaka); June 17, 2017 (Japan)
- Running time: 90 minutes
- Country: Japan
- Language: Japanese
- Box office: ¥560 million

The Irregular at Magic High School: The Movie – The Girl Who Summons the Stars (Japanese: 劇場版 魔法科高校の劣等生 星を呼ぶ少女, Hepburn: Gekijōban Mahōka Kōkō no Rettōsei: Hoshi o Yobu Shōjo) is a 2017 Japanese animated film based on the light novel series The Irregular at Magic High School by Tsutomu Satō. Produced by Eight Bit and distributed by Aniplex, the film was directed by Risako Yoshida based on the original story written by Satō, who also wrote the script along with Muneo Nakamoto. Set after the events of the eleventh volume of the light novel, the film follows the Shiba siblings enjoying spring break on an island with their friends when they meet a young girl on the run.

An anime film project was announced in March 2016, with Saori Hayami and Yuichi Nakamura reprising their respective roles from The Irregular at Magic High School anime series as the Shiba siblings Miyuki and Tatsuya. The cast from the anime series were confirmed to be returning for the film in October 2016 and in March 2017, while new cast were announced in March and April, including Konomi Kohara as the voice of the original character Kokoa.

The Irregular at Magic High School: The Movie – The Girl Who Summons the Stars premiered in Tokyo and Osaka on June 5, 2017, and was released in Japan on June 17. The film grossed ¥560 million at the box office.

== Plot ==
In late March 2096, (Note: Set after the events of the eleventh volume of The Irregular at Magic High School light novel series.) Tatsuya Shiba and his little sister Miyuki enjoy their spring vacation along with Erika Chiba, Leonhard Saijo, Mizuki Shibata, Mikihiko Yoshida, and Honoka Mitsui in a villa owned by Shizuku Kitayama's family at Bonin Islands when Tatsuya receives an order from the military to destroy an asteroid on course to collide with Earth. After spending their time in a shopping district at Minamitate Island, Miyuki's friends find a young girl hiding in their plane as they return to the villa. They learn her name as Kokoa and her involvement in an experiment with her other eight identical modified magicians, known as the Watatsumi series, who are being used in a huge CAD machine to activate a large-scale magic sequence. Kokoa pleads for their help to rescue the others in a research facility at Minamitate, where she is helped by Dr. Morinaga to escape and meet her former student's sister Mayumi Saegusa.

With the help of Miyuki, Erika, Leo, and Mikihiko, Tatsuya infiltrates the research facility and rescues the imprisoned Morinaga, who reveals the experiment to create a Strategic-class Magic called "Meteorite Fall" is capable of causing an astronomical object to fall on Earth and set to be used as a weapon to match Material Burst that is used during the Scorched Halloween. (Note: As depicted in the final episode of The Irregular at Magic High School anime series.) Meanwhile, magicians from the military organization STARS of the United States of North American (USNA), led by Angelina Kudou Shields, begin their operation to destroy the research facility to prevent the creation of another Strategic-class Magic. After rescuing the Watatsumi girls, Tatsuya learns that the Meteorite Fall causes the USNA-owned space station Seventh Plague carrying uranium bombs to begin descending toward Earth.

As they assist the Watatsumi girls for safety, Erika and Leo encounter Stars magicians Ralph Algol and Ralph Hardy Mirphak attacking the facility. Katsuto Jyumonji arrives to assist Erika and Leo in their fight. After destroying the huge CAD machine to prevent a repeat of the experiment, Tatsuya contacts Angelina for assistance in dealing with the space station by sending him into space where he can destroy it before entering the atmosphere. The destruction of the space station causes an aurora to appear in the night sky. Accompanied by Honoka, Shizuku, Mayumi, and Mari Watanabe, Kokoa is reunited with the other Watatsumi girls at the Kanto branch of the Magic Association.

== Voice cast ==
- Yūichi Nakamura as Tatsuya Shiba
- Saori Hayami as Miyuki Shiba
- Takuma Terashima as Leonhard Saijo
- Yumi Uchiyama as Erika Chiba
- Satomi Satō as Mizuki Shibata
- Atsushi Tamaru as Mikihiko Yoshida
- Sora Amamiya as Honoka Mitsui
- Yuiko Tatsumi as Shizuku Kiyatama
- Kana Hanazawa as Mayumi Saegusa
- Marina Inoue as Mari Watanabe
- Junichi Suwabe as Katsuto Jumonji
- Konomi Kohara as Kokoa
- Tōru Ōkawa as Harunobu Kazama
- Tarusuke Shingaki as Shigeru Sanada
- Chisa Yuki as Chieri Kurosawa
- Akeno Watanabe as Nazuna Takeuchi
- Jin Yamanoi as Benjamin Canopus
- Satoshi Hino as Ralph Algol
- Masaki Aizawa as Ralph Hardy Mirphak
- Chie Horikoshi as Sylvia Mercury First
- Yōko Hikasa as Angelina Kudou Shields
- Hiroe Oka as Meiko Morinaga
- Yoshito Yasuhara as Takao Kanemaru

== Production ==
In March 2016, the staff of Dengeki Bunko first teased on its Twitter account an "important announcement" that would be included on the wrap-around jacket of the nineteenth volume of The Irregular at Magic High School light novel series. Upon the release of the volume in the same month, the announcement confirmed an anime film project had been green-lit, which would be based on an original new story written by the light novel series author Tsutomu Satō. Additionally, Saori Hayami and Yuichi Nakamura were confirmed to be reprising their respective roles from the franchise's anime television series in the film as Miyuki Shiba and Tatsuya Shiba.

In October 2016, an original character named Kokoa and the film's full title were revealed. Additionally, Yumi Uchiyama, Takuma Terashima, Satomi Satō, Atsushi Tamaru, Sora Amamiya, and Yuiko Tatsumi were also revealed to be reprising their respective anime series roles in the film as Erika Chiba, Leonhart Saijo, Mizuki Shibata, Mikihiko Yoshida, Honoka Mitsui, and Shizuku Kitayama. In February 2017, the staff that would helm the film at Eight Bit were revealed, including Risako Yoshida as the director, the light novel series illustrator Kana Ishida as the character designer and chief animation director, Satō and Munemasa Nakamoto at WriteWorks as screenwriters, Yūki Kawashita as the director of photography, and Kashiko Kimura as the editor.

In March 2017, Yōko Hikasa and Konomi Kohara were revealed to be respectively voicing the characters Angelina Kudou Shields and Kokoa. Additionally, Kana Hanazawa, Marina Inoue, and Junichi Suwabe were confirmed to be reprising their respective anime series roles in the film as Mayumi Saegusa, Mari Watanabe, and Katsuto Jyumonji. In April 2017, Jin Yamanoi, Satoshi Hino, and Masaki Aizawa were announced as the respective voices of Benjamin Canopus, Ralph Algol, and Ralph Hardy Mirphak, Stars magicians from the United States of North American Continent.

== Music ==
Taku Iwasaki was confirmed to be composing The Irregular at Magic High School: The Movie – The Girl Who Summons the Stars in February 2017, after previously doing so for The Irregular at Magic High School anime series. In March 2017, Garnidelia was revealed to be performing the theme song for the film titled "Speed Star". Its single was released in Japan on June 14, 2017, while the film's original soundtrack was released by Aniplex on January 24, 2018.

The Irregular at Magic High School: The Movie – The Girl Who Summons the Stars track listing
No.	Title	Length
1.	"The capsule"	2:55
2.	"Description1"	0:50
3.	"DOSKOI"	1:20
4.	"Revenge of Ballerina"	2:18
5.	"release"	0:44
6.	"KNMR"	2:07
7.	"bitter"	0:31
8.	"×-game"	1:23
9.	"escape"	0:27
10.	"soldier1"	0:32
11.	"soldier2"	1:12
12.	"kielo"	2:02
13.	"mercy"	3:37
14.	"HNM"	1:54
15.	"Description2"	2:50
16.	"Opus-12"	2:22
17.	"TTY"	1:45
18.	"HNWK"	1:06
19.	"、、、、"	1:02
20.	"I Don't Have a Choice"	0:59
21.	"Moval Suit"	2:19
22.	"atmosphere"	0:24
23.	"AKK"	1:55
24.	"Seventh plague"	2:05
25.	"kielo2"	1:24
26.	"Psycho Bastard"	2:28
27.	"MD vs PLX"	1:55
28.	"failure"	2:02
29.	"Zuko"	1:04
30.	"Description3"	0:42
31.	"HTDU"	4:29
32.	"SDO"	2:35
33.	"Not Used"	0:30
Total length:		55:48

== Marketing ==
The first promotional video and key visual for The Irregular at Magic High School: The Movie – The Girl Who Summons the Stars were released in March 2016. The second promotional video and key visual for the film were released in October 2016. The film received the third key visual in February 2017, the fourth key visual in March, and the fifth and final key visual in April. Aniplex released the first two minutes of the film on June 12, 2017. A television special for the film featuring a competition between the former track-and-field athlete Sō Takei and Tatsuya was aired in Japan on Tokyo MX on June 13, 2017, and on BS11 on June 15.

Moviegoers who had attended the film's screenings from June 17 to June 23, 2017, received an original novel written by Satō and illustrated by Ishida titled Beautiful Girl Magic Guardian Plasma Lina (美少女魔法戦士プラズマリーナ, Bishōjo Mahō Senshi Plasma Lina), which features the childhood of Angelina Kudou Shields prior joining Stars. Additional novels were given to the moviegoers who viewed the film in Japan: The Irregular at Magic High School If (魔法科高校の劣等生「IF」, Mahōka Kōkō no Rettōsei IF), which features the female characters of the franchise becoming idols, and Continuation Reminiscence Arc - Frozen Island (続・追憶編――凍てつく島――, Zoku Tsuioku-hen: Itetsuku Shima), which follows middle school students Miyuki and Tatsuya at Miyaki Island for a training of Miyuki's Niflheim magic.

Promotional partners for the film included the Onigiri Society, which produced a collaborative onigiri; Mameshiba, which produced a Mameshiba-styled Tatsuya and Miyuki characters that were featured in four commercial videos and had goods available in theaters; the Japanese mobile games Pocolon Dungeons, The Samurai Kingdom: Senran, and Himegami Emaki; the Japanese tool company GodHand, which produced a limited Tatsuya Shiba-styled nipper; Karaoke no Tetsujin; and the café NewType Shinjuku.

== Release ==
=== Theatrical ===
The Irregular at Magic High School: The Movie – The Girl Who Summons the Stars had special previews for about 750 guests simultaneously at the Shinjuku Wald 9 theater in Tokyo and the Umeda Burg 7 theater in Osaka on June 5, 2017, and was released in Japan on June 17. The film was released in the United States by Azoland Pictures on July 28, 2017, following its American premiere held by Aniplex of America at Anime Expo in Los Angeles earlier that month. Madman Anime released the film in Australia and New Zealand on November 2, 2017.

=== Home media ===
The Irregular at Magic High School: The Movie – The Girl Who Summons the Stars was released on Blu-ray and DVD by Aniplex in Japan on January 24, 2018, and on digital on April 25. The special features of the Blu-ray and DVD limited editions include the film's novelization written by Satō and illustrated by Ishida, the television special, and a special CD featuring the songs "Naked Star" by Hikasa as Angelina and "Small Wish" (ささやかな願い) by Kohara as Kokoa. Aniplex of America released the film on Blu-ray in the United States on July 10, 2018. The film was aired in Japan on AT-X on August 12, 2018, and again on January 5, 2019. Funimation streamed the film in the United States and Canada for two weeks starting May 1, 2020.

== Reception ==
=== Box office ===
The Irregular at Magic High School: The Movie – The Girl Who Summons the Stars grossed ¥560 million (US$4.99 million) in Japan. Outside Japan, the film grossed $16,694 in Australia.

The film earned ¥163 million ($1.47 million) in its opening weekend in Japan, ranking fifth at the box office. The film grossed ¥300 million ($2.67 million) in its second weekend and ¥400 million ($3.53 million) in its third weekend. After two weeks, the film reached the 500-million-yen mark at the box office.

=== Critical response ===
Kim Morrissy of Anime News Network graded The Irregular at Magic High School: The Movie – The Girl Who Summons the Stars "C+", feeling that the film was "a popcorn flick featuring some cool action set pieces within a largely unremarkable standalone plot". She praised the film's "[t]ighter pacing", soundtrack, and fan service scenes that "work reasonably well" while criticized the "[p]oor animation and CG integration" and the story "[that] is inaccessible to anime-only fans".

== Manga adaptation ==
A manga adaptation of The Irregular at Magic High School: The Movie – The Girl Who Summons the Stars illustrated by Pinake was serialized in Monthly Comic Dengeki Daioh magazine from August 26, 2017, to June 27, 2018. Before the serialization, a prologue chapter for the manga was released on June 27, 2017. Two tankōbon volumes of the manga were released in Japan from February 9 to August 9, 2018.
