= The Irregular at Magic High School season 3 =

Third season of The Irregular at Magic High School anime television series

The Irregular at Magic High School
- Season 3
- Promotional poster for the third season.
- No. of episodes: 13

Release
- Original network: Tokyo MX
- Original release: April 5 – June 28, 2024

Season chronology
- ← Previous; Season 2

The Irregular at Magic High School is an anime adaptation of a light novel series written by Tsutomu Satō. In January 2022, a sequel to the anime series was announced. In July 2023, the sequel was confirmed to be a new television series directed by Jimmy Stone at Eight Bit. The season aired from April 5 to June 28, 2024. The opening theme is "Shouted Serenade" by LiSA and the ending themes are "recall" by Kairi Yagi, "Snow Noir" by Sangatsu no Phantasia, and "Shion no Hanataba o" (紫苑の花束を; "Aster Bouquet") by ASCA.

== Episodes ==
No. overall	No. in season	Title	Directed by (Note: Information is taken from the ending credits of each episode.)	Storyboarded by	Original release date
40	1	"Double Seven Part I"; Transliteration: "Daburu Sebun-hen I" (Japanese: ダブルセブン編I)	Jimmy Stone	Jimmy Stone	April 5, 2024
41	2	"Double Seven Part II"; Transliteration: "Daburu Sebun-hen II" (Japanese: ダブルセブン編II)	Junichi Takaoka	Junichi Takaoka	April 12, 2024
42	3	"Double Seven Part III"; Transliteration: "Daburu Sebun-hen III" (Japanese: ダブルセブン編III)	Risako Yoshida	Risako Yoshida	April 19, 2024
43	4	"Double Seven Part IV"; Transliteration: "Daburu Sebun-hen IV" (Japanese: ダブルセブン編IV)	Jimmy Stone	Ken Ōtsuka	April 26, 2024
44	5	"Steeplechase Part I"; Transliteration: "Sutīpuruchēsu-hen I" (Japanese: スティープルチェース編I)	Akira Toba	Risako Yoshida	May 3, 2024
45	6	"Steeplechase Part II"; Transliteration: "Sutīpuruchēsu-hen II" (Japanese: スティープルチェース編II)	Ryoutarou	Katsumi Terahigashi	May 10, 2024
46	7	"Steeplechase Part III"; Transliteration: "Sutīpuruchēsu-hen III" (Japanese: スティープルチェース編III)	Tatsuya Sasaki	Katsumi Terahigashi	May 17, 2024
47	8	"Steeplechase Part IV"; Transliteration: "Sutīpuruchēsu-hen IV" (Japanese: スティープルチェース編IV)	Jimmy Stone, Munenori Nawa, Risako Yoshida, Mitsutoshi Satō	Ken Ōtsuka	May 24, 2024
48	9	"Ancient City Insurrection Part I"; Transliteration: "Koto Nairan-hen I" (Japanese: 古都内乱編I)	Yoshinobu Kasai	Masao Kojima	May 31, 2024
49	10	"Ancient City Insurrection Part II"; Transliteration: "Koto Nairan-hen II" (Japanese: 古都内乱編II)	Yinkai Cai	Masao Kojima	June 7, 2024
50	11	"Ancient City Insurrection Part III"; Transliteration: "Koto Nairan-hen III" (Japanese: 古都内乱編III)	Kentaro Mizuno	Katsumi Terahigashi	June 14, 2024
51	12	"Ancient City Insurrection Part IV"; Transliteration: "Koto Nairan-hen IV" (Japanese: 古都内乱編IV)	Unknown	TBA	June 21, 2024
52	13	"Ancient City Insurrection Part V"; Transliteration: "Koto Nairan-hen V" (Japanese: 古都内乱編V)	Risako Yoshida, Chacha Yamamoto	Jimmy Stone, Tomomi Mochizuki	June 28, 2024
