= Speed Star (Garnidelia song) =

- The regular edition cover

Single by Garnidelia

from the album G.R.N.D.
- B-side: "Diamond"
- Released: June 14, 2017
- Recorded: 2017
- Studio: Parasight Mastering (Tokyo, Japan)
- Genre: J-pop
- Length: 4:07
- Label: Sacra Music
- Songwriter: MARiA
- Producer: Garnidelia

Garnidelia singles chronology
"Yakusoku -Promise Code-" (2016)	"Speed Star" (2017)	"Désir" (2017)

Alternative cover
- The limited anime edition cover

Music video
- "Speed Star" on YouTube

"Speed Star" (stylized as SPEED STAR) is a song by Japanese pop rock duo Garnidelia. It was released as the unit's sixth single on June 14, 2017. It reached number 11 on Oricon and number 21 on Japan Hot 100. It was used as the theme song for the anime film The Irregular at Magic High School: The Movie – The Girl Who Summons the Stars.

== Release ==
On 13 March 2017, Aniplex revealed in event at the Dengeki Game Festival 2017 event about more details of the anime film The Irregular at Magic High School: The Movie – The Girl Who Summons the Stars including the theme song "Speed Star" that would be sung by Garnidelia. The song was released as a single on 14 June 2020 on three edition; Regular edition, Limited edition and Limited anime edition. The single reached number 11 on Oricon, 21 on Japan Hot 100, and 3 on Japan Hot Animation with spent 6, 3 and 3 weeks respectively. The album version of this song, which use the intro in the music video, was featured in their third album "G.R.N.D.".

== Music video ==
The music video for "Speed Star" was directed by Shin Okawa. The video features the duo with the bands playing the song in the studio, with sometimes the scene show MARiA and toku play in the outer space that show much star in the sky. Some scene feature MARiA dance with two of the girls. The music video sometimes use black and white effect, which refer to their second single. (Note: The style effect of music video is refer to grilletto, cause grilletto's music video is using the same style of the effect itself, which make this song is called the continuation of grilletto, remembering that grilletto is used as the second opening of the series, while speed star is used as the theme song of the movie series)

== Track listing ==
All tracks written by MARiA.

=== Regular edition ===
CD
No.	Title	Length
1.	"SPEED STAR"	4:07
2.	"Diamond"	3:35
3.	"Angel's ladder"	3:42
4.	"SPEED STAR" (Instrumental)	4:05

=== Limited edition ===
CD
No.	Title	Length
1.	"SPEED STAR"	4:07
2.	"Diamond"	3:35
3.	"Angel's ladder"	3:42
4.	"SPEED STAR" (Instrumental)	4:05

DVD
No.	Title	Length
1.	"SPEED STAR" (music video)	4:18
2.	"Shion (紫苑)" (stellacage vol.V@StellarBall)
3.	"NEON NIGHT" (stellacage vol.V@StellarBall)
4.	"Gokuraku Jodo (極楽浄土)" (stellacage vol.V@StellarBall)

=== Limited anime edition ===
CD
No.	Title	Length
1.	"SPEED STAR"	4:07
2.	"Diamond"	3:35
3.	"Angel's ladder"	3:42
4.	"SPEED STAR" (Instrumental)	4:05

DVD
No.	Title	Length
1.	"SPEED STAR" (music video)	4:18

== Personnel ==
Garnidelia

- MARiA – vocals
- toku – music

Bands

- Hiroshi Sekita - Bass
- Takeo Kajiwara - Guitar
- Mi-cyan - Drums
- Ayako Himata - Violin & Viola

Production

- Kimihiro Nakase, toku – recording
- Satoshi Hosoi – mixer
- Hiromichi Takiguchi – mastering

== Charts ==
Year	Chart	Peak position
2017	Oricon	11
2017	Japan Hot 100	21
2017	Japan Hot Animation	3

== Release history ==
Region	Date	Label	Format	Catalog
Japan	14 June 2017	Sacra Music	CD	VVCL-1037
Japan	14 June 2017	Sacra Music	CD+DVD	VVCL-1035
Japan	14 June 2017	Sacra Music	CD+DVD	VVCL-1038
