= Garnidelia =

Japanese musical duo

GARNiDELiA
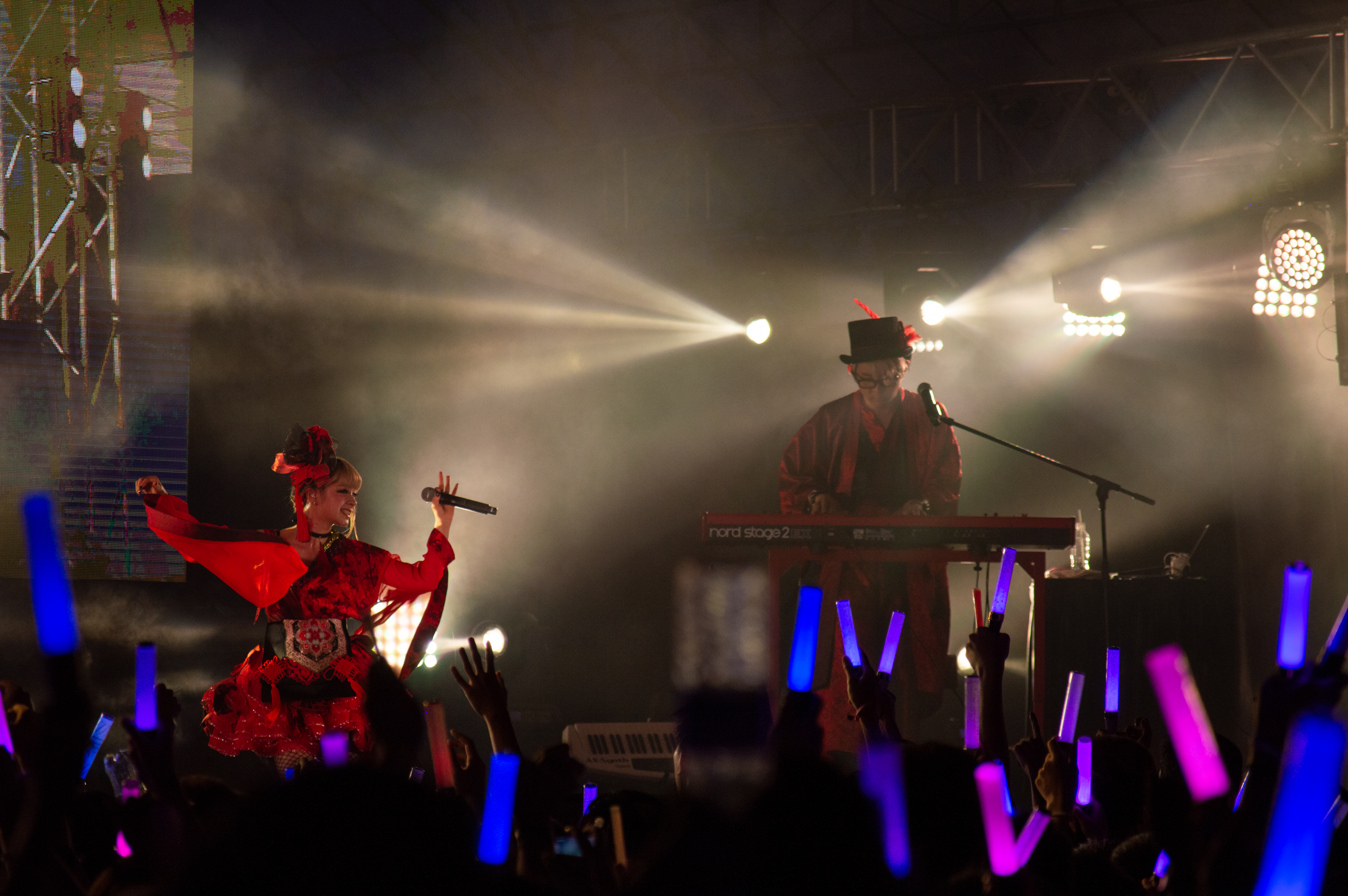
- GARNiDELiA performing at Sakura Matsuri in 2018

Background information
- Origin: Tokyo, Japan
- Genres: J-pop, Electronic, Eurodance, Pop rock, power pop, synthpop
- Years active: 2010–2025
- Labels: Headphone-Tokyo (as indie) (2010–2013); Defstar Records(2014–2015); SME Records (2015–2017); SACRA MUSIC (2017–2019); Universal Music Japan (2020–2021); Pony Canyon Inc. (2021–2025); SUPER DIRECTION inc
- Members: MARiA toku
- Website: www.garnidelia.com

Garnidelia (ガルニデリア, Hepburn: Garunideria) (stylized as GARNiDELiA) is a Japanese pop rock duo, consisting of singer Mai Mizuhashi, better known by her stage name MARiA and Vocaloid record producer Yoshinori Abe (ja:阿部尚徳, Abe Yoshinori; born March 5, 1978), better known by his stage name toku.

== History ==
The duo first collaborated on the song "Color", which was used as the opening theme to the 2010 anime television series Freezing. The name of their unit came from the French phrase "Le Palais Garnier de Maria" (Maria's Opera), and the asteroid Cordelia, which was discovered in 1978, the year of toku's birth.

In 2014, they made their debut under the major record label Defstar Records with the single "ambiguous", which was released on March 5, 2014, whose title track is used as the second opening theme to the 2013 anime television series Kill la Kill. Later that year, MARiA collaborated with Vocaloid producer Jin and performed the song "Daze", which is used as the opening theme to the 2014 anime television series Mekakucity Actors. Their second single "Grilletto", which was released on July 30, 2014, was used as the second opening theme to the anime television series The Irregular at Magic High School. Their third single "Blazing", which was released on October 29, 2014, is used as the first opening theme to the anime television series Gundam Reconguista in G. Their debut album Linkage Ring was released on January 21, 2015.

GARNiDELiA's fourth single "MIRAI", which was released on May 13, 2015, is used as the ending theme to the anime series Gunslinger Stratos. Their indie album Birthia was released on August 26, 2015, which contains remade songs that were made before their debut single, such as "ARiA", "SPiCa", and "ORiON".

Their third digital single "Burning Soul" was released on April 13, 2016. It was used as the theme song for the MMORPG game Soul Worker. Their fifth single "Yakusoku -Promise Code-" (約束 -Promise code-, Promise -Promise Code-), was available digitally 10 days before it was released on August 17, 2016; and was used as the second ending to the anime series Qualidea Code. The B-side to that single, Gokuraku Jodo, received unexpected popularity in China as a dance hit after it was shared onto the video site Bilibili, spoofing various covers. GARNiDELiA collaborated with ClariS in performing the song "Clever" released on September 14, 2016; the song is used as the third ending theme to Qualidea Code. Their second album Violet Cry was released on December 14, 2016.

GARNiDELiA moved to the Sacra Music record label under Sony Music Entertainment Japan in April 2017. Their sixth single "Speed Star" is released on June 14, 2017; the song is used as the ending theme of The Irregular at Magic High School: The Movie – The Girl Who Summons the Stars. Their seventh single "Désir" (Desire) was released on August 23, 2017; the song is used as the ending theme of anime Fate/Apocrypha. Their eighth single "Aikotoba" (アイコトバ, Password) was released on November 1, 2017; the song was used as the opening theme of anime Animegataris.

Their ninth single, "Error" was released digitally on January 27, 2018, and received a physical release on January 31, 2018; the song is used as the opening theme of anime series Beatless. Their third album G.R.N.D. was released on March 28, 2018. Their second compilation Eurodance-style album "Kyouki Ranbu" (響喜乱舞, Dancing Wildly with Joy) was released on September 26, 2018; the album contains dance covers by MARiA, Miume, and Niina (217), such as Gokuraku Jodo, Kureha Itoshiuta, Tougen Renka, avra K'davarah, Lamb, Girls, and PiNK CAT.

Their tenth single, "Rebel Flag" was released digitally on January 12, 2019, and received a physical release on March 13, 2019; the song is used as the ending theme of anime series Magical Girl Spec-Ops Asuka. At the end of August 2019, it was announced that they would leave Sacra Music following their contract expiration in 2019. Their last best album under the label, GARNiDELIA BEST, was released on December 12, 2019.

On June 29, 2020, it was announced that GARNiDELiA moved to the label music Universal Music Japan, following the release of their first digital single of their new label "Star Trail". On August 9, 2020, they made a self cover of the song "Gurenge" in their official YouTube; the cover is part of their official cover, titled GARNiDELiA Cover Collection. Their 2nd digital single "Secret Party" was released on September 23. It was used as theme song to their Halloween Party.
Their 4th album Kishikaisei was released on November 25, 2020. The album contains 8 brand-new songs along with Secret Party and Star Trail.

On September 2, 2025, GARNiDELiA announced that they would be going on indefinite hiatus, with all upcoming tour dates being canceled. MARiA initially reacted on social media with surprise, stating that she did not know about the announcement in advance. She later gave a statement alleging that her agency had not properly compensated her for her activities over the years. According to MARiA, after she submitted a termination notice to her agency through her lawyer in August, the agency announced the band's hiatus before she had the opportunity to discuss the matter privately with toku.

== Discography ==
=== Albums ===
==== Studio albums ====
| | Year | Album details | Track listing | Peak Oricon chart positions | Peak Billboard chart positions |
|---|---|---|---|---|---|
| 1st | 2015 | Linkage Ring: Released: January 21, 2015; Label: DefSTAR RECORDS (DFCL-2110, DFCL-2112, DFCL-2114); Format: CD, CD+DVD, CD+BD | 1. PRIDE; 2. True High; 3. Gravity; 4. BLAZING; 5. Hutarizaryuseigun; 6. Moon Landing; 7. march; 8. Steps; 9. Lamb.; 10. Ookami shoujo; 11. grilletto; 12. ambiguous; 13. LiNKAGE | 11 | — |
| 2nd | 2016 | Violet Cry: Released: December 14, 2016; Label: SME Records (SECL-2087, SECL-2089, SECL-2091); Format: CD, CD+DVD, CD+BD | 1. EXXXTASY; 2. REAL; 3. yakusoku -Promise code-; 4. Burning Soul; 5. LIFE; 6. Inori no Uta; 7. Cry; 8. Gokuraku Shoudo; 9. NEON NIGHT; 10. BAD BOY - GARNiDELiA vs HEAVYGRINDER; 11. My little happiness; 12. Kawaranaimono; 13. MIRAI | 21 | 17 |
| 3rd | 2018 | G.R.N.D.: Released: March 28, 2018; Label: SACRA MUSIC (VVCL-1197, VVCL-1199, VVCL-1201); Format: CD, CD+DVD, CD+BD | 1. G.R.N.D.; 2. SPEED STAR - Album Ver.; 3. Jesus; 4. Hysteric Bullet; 5. Poppin'Trip - GARNiDELiA vs HEAVYGRINDER; 6. Aikotoba; 7. Tougenrenka; 8. Kurehaitosiuta; 9. Love Swing; 10. After glow; 11.Error: 12. Desir; 13. Saigo no koi | 12 | 12 |
| 4th | 2020 | Kishikaisei: Released: November 25, 2020; Label: UNIVERSAL MUSIC JAPAN (UICZ-4478, UICZ-9176, UICZ-9166); Format: CD, CD+DVD, CD+BD | 1. Kishikaisei; 2. IDENtity; 3. Light your heart up; 4. Beyond the sky; 5. Kaibutsuno Yume; 6. Secret Party; 7. Yoiyamikocho; 8. Never Ever; 9. star trail; 10. Takaramono; 11. LoveLifeLogic | 24 | 26 |
| 5th | 2021 | Duality Code: Released: November 17, 2021; Label: Pony Canyon Inc. (PCCA-06088, SCCA-00125, PCCA-06087); Format: CD, CD+Live BD, CD+BD | 1. Live On!; 2. my code; 3. Uncertainty; 4. Seeker; 5. Aquarium; 6. Pierrot; 7. Milk Caramel; 8. Otome no Kokoroe; 9. Hajimete no Christmas; 10. Haru ga Kita yo; 11. stellacage; 12. Reason | 24 | |
| 6th | 2024 | Ten: Released: January 17, 2024; Label: Pony Canyon Inc. (PCCA-06254, SCCA-00151, PCCA-06253); Format: CD, CD+Live BD, CD+BD | 1. -Ten-; 2. Akatsuki Zakura; 3. Soten; 4. Oka Ramman; 5. Gen Ai Yugi; 6. Cat Planet; 7. Queen(s) Game; 8. Fiction; 9. FRONTiER; 10. Suzuran; 11. Ichirentakusho; 12. Only; 13. Future Wing | 24 | — |

==== Best-of albums ====
| Album details | Year | Peak Oricon chart positions | Peak Billboard chart positions |
|---|---|---|---|
| BiRTHiA (Indies best): Released: August 26, 2015; Label: SME Records (SECL-1752~3, SECL-1754); Format: CD, CD+DVD | 2015 | 27 | 22 |
| Kyouki Ranbu (響喜乱舞, Dancing Wildly with Joy): Released: September 26, 2018; Label: SACRA MUSIC (VVCL-1296~7, VVCL-1298); Format: CD, CD+Photobook | 2018 | 14 | 17 |
| GARNiDELiA BEST: Released: December 4, 2019; Label: SACRA MUSIC (VVCL 1568–9, VVCL 1570–1, VVCL 1572); Format: CD, CD+BD, CD+Photobook | 2019 | 25 | 27 |
| GARNiDELiA Cover Collection: Released: March 22, 2023; Label: Pony Canyon Inc. (PCCA-06191); Format: CD | 2023 | — | 43 |
| Grnd the Best Progress: Released: February 26, 2025; Label: Pony Canyon Inc. (BRCA-00154, BRCA-00155, PCCA-06362, PCCA-06363); Format: 2CD+Blu-ray, 2CD, CD | 2025 | 43 | TBA |
"—" denotes releases that did not chart.

==== Mini albums ====
| Year | Album details |
|---|---|
| 2010 | ONE: Released: December 31, 2010; Format: Digital download |
| 2012 | PLUSLIGHTS -21248931-: Released: August 11, 2012; Format: Digital download |

=== Singles ===
| Title | Year | Peak Oricon chart positions | Peak Billboard chart positions | Album |
|---|---|---|---|---|
| Prayer: Released: May 1, 2011 | 2011 | — | — | Non-album single |
| ambiguous (Kill la Kill opening theme): Released: March 05, 2014 | 2014 | 15 | 19 | Linkage Ring |
| grilletto (The Irregular at Magic High School opening theme): Released: July 30, 2014 | 2014 | 17 | 17 | Linkage Ring |
| BLAZING (Gundam Reconguista in G opening theme): Released: October 29, 2014 | 2014 | 14 | 11 | Linkage Ring |
| MIRAI (Gunslinger Stratos ending theme): Released: May 13, 2015 | 2015 | 29 | 60 | Violet Cry |
| Yakusoku -Promise Code- (約束 -Promise code-, Promise -Promise Code-) (Qualidea Code ending theme): Released: August 17, 2016 | 2016 | 20 | 40 | Violet Cry |
| Speed Star (The Irregular at Magic High School: The Movie – The Girl Who Summons the Stars ending theme): Released: June 14, 2017 | 2017 | 11 | 21 | G.R.N.D. |
| Désir (Fate/Apocrypha ending theme): Released: August 23, 2017 | 2017 | 14 | 19 | G.R.N.D. |
| Aikotoba (アイコトバ, Password) (Anime-Gataris opening theme): Released: November 1, 2017 | 2017 | 21 | 61 | G.R.N.D. |
| Error (Beatless opening theme): Released: January 31, 2018 | 2018 | 22 | 40 | G.R.N.D. |
| Rebel Flag (Magical Girl Spec-Ops Asuka ending theme): Released: March 13, 2019 | 2019 | 21 | — | GARNiDELiA BEST. |
"—" denotes releases that did not chart.

==== Collaboration singles ====
| Year | Song | Peak Oricon chart positions | Peak Billboard chart positions | Album | Notes |
|---|---|---|---|---|---|
| 2016 | Clever (with ClariS) (Qualidea Code ending theme): Released: September 14, 2016 | 21 | 33 | Fairy Castle | The song is added on ClariS fourth studio album |

==== Digital singles ====
| Year | Song | Album |
|---|---|---|
| 2010 | Hands: Released September 13, 2010 | BiRTHiA |
| 2013 | Break down: Released December 2, 2013 | BiRTHiA |
| 2014 | True High: Released: January 15, 2014 | Linkage Ring |
| 2013 | Lamb: Released: October 2013 | Linkage Ring |
| 2015 | PiNK CAT: Released: April, 2015 | Linkage Ring |
| 2016 | Burning Soul: Released: April 13, 2016 | Violet Cry |
| 2016 | Gokuraku Jodo (極楽浄土, Paradise): Released: July 27, 2016 | Violet Cry |
| 2017 | Tougen Renka (桃源恋歌, Tougen Renka): Released: May 15, 2017 | G.R.N.D. |
| 2018 | Kureha Itoshiuta (紅葉愛唄, Kureha Itoshiuta): Released: February 5, 2018 | G.R.N.D. |
| 2018 | avra K'Davarah (アブラカダブラ): Released: July 23, 2018 | Kyokiranbu |
| 2018 | Kyouki Ranbu (響喜乱舞): Released: September 23, 2018 | Kyokiranbu |
| 2020 | Star Trail: Released: June 29, 2020 | Kishikaisei |
| 2020 | Secret Party: Released: September 23, 2020 | Kishikaisei |
| 2020 | Kishikaisei (起死回生): Released: October 30, 2020 | Kishikaisei |
| 2021 | Haru ga Kitayo (春がきたよ) (Dōse Mō Nigerarenai (Drama) opening theme): Released: September 17, 2021 | Duality Code |
| 2021 | Otome no Kokoroe (オトメの心得) (Taisho Otome Otogibanashi opening theme): Released: October 9, 2021 | Duality Code |
| 2022 | Gen Ai Yugi (幻愛遊戯) (My Master Has No Tail opening theme): Released: September 30, 2022 | Ten |
| 2022 | Oka Ramman (謳歌爛漫): Released: October 18, 2022 | Ten |
| 2022 | Souten (蒼天) (Soukai Tenki theme song): Released: December 8, 2022 | Ten |
| 2023 | Only (Sacrificial Princess and the King of Beasts ending theme): Released: April 20, 2023 | Ten |
| 2023 | Mitsuyoshihiki / My Code (光之指引/my code) (Alchemy Stars theme song): Released: July 28, 2023 | Duality Code |
| 2023 | Future Wing (Genshin Impact 3rd Anniversary theme song): Released: October 2, 2023 | Ten |
| 2023 | Akatsuki Zakura (Onmyoji mobile game theme song): Released: October 18, 2023 | Ten |
| 2024 | Gokuraku Jodo [Progress] (極楽浄土 [Progress], Paradise [Progress]): Released: October 30, 2024 | Grnd The Best Progress |
| 2024 | Tougen Renka [Progress] (桃源恋歌 [Progress]): Released: November 27, 2024 | Grnd The Best Progress |
| 2024 | Kyouki Ranbu [Progress] (響喜乱舞 [Progress]): Released: December 25, 2024 | Grnd The Best Progress |
| 2025 | Zainin (罪人) (Übel Blatt opening theme): Released: January 11, 2025 | Grnd The Best Progress |

==== GARNiDELiA Cover Collection ====
| Year | Song | Artist(s) |
|---|---|---|
| 2020 | Gurenge: Released August 8, 2020 | LiSA |
| 2020 | Pretender: Released August 8, 2020 | Official Hige Dandism |
| 2020 | Hakujitsu: Released August 22, 2020 | King Gnu |
| 2022 | CITRUS: Released March 4, 2022 | Da-iCE |
| 2022 | Haru-yo, Koi: Released April 1, 2022 | Yumi Matsutoya |
| 2022 | Dried Flower: Released May 6, 2022 | Yuuri |
| 2022 | No Regret: Released June 2, 2022 | wacci |
| 2022 | Kaikai Kitan: Released July 1, 2022 | Eve |
| 2022 | Friends: Released August 5, 2022 | REBECCA |
| 2023 | DEPARTURES: Released February 24, 2023 | globe |
| 2023 | BREAK OUT!: Released March 20, 2023 | Aikawa Nanase |
| 2023 | Kazari Nainoyo Namida Wa: Released March 22, 2023 | Akina Nakamori |
