= Qualidea Code =

Light novel series

クオリディア・コード (Kuoridia Kōdo)
- Genre: Action, supernatural
- Light novel

Kuzu to Kinka no Qualidea
- Written by: Sō Sagara; Wataru Watari
- Illustrated by: Saboten
- Published by: Shueisha
- Imprint: Dash X Bunko
- Published: January 23, 2015
- Light novel

Itsuka Sekai o Sukū Tame ni: Qualidea Code
- Written by: Kōshi Tachibana
- Illustrated by: Kiyotaka Haimura
- Published by: Fujimi Shobo
- Imprint: Fujimi Fantashia Bunko
- Original run: July 18, 2015 – January 20, 2016
- Volumes: 2
- Light novel

Sonna Sekai wa Kowashiteshimae: Qualidea Code
- Written by: Sō Sagara
- Illustrated by: Kantoku
- Published by: Media Factory
- Imprint: MF Bunko J
- Original run: October 23, 2015 – June 24, 2016
- Volumes: 2
- Anime television series
- Directed by: Kenichi Kawamura
- Produced by: Yoshito Danno; Masazuki Katō; Takahashi Yuba; Masao Satō
- Written by: Kōshi Tachibana; Sō Sagara; Wataru Watari
- Music by: Taku Iwasaki
- Studio: A-1 Pictures
- Original network: Tokyo MX, GYT, GTV, BS11, tvk, CTC, ABC, AT-X
- Original run: July 10, 2016 – September 25, 2016
- Episodes: 12
- Light novel

Dōdemo Ii Sekai Nante: Qualidea Code
- Written by: Wataru Watari
- Illustrated by: Saitom
- Published by: Shogakukan
- Imprint: Gagaga Bunko
- Published: July 20, 2016
- icon

Qualidea Code (クオリディア・コード, Kuoridia Kōdo) is a Japanese multimedia project co-published by Shueisha's Dash X Bunko imprint, Fujimi Shobo's Fujimi Fantasia Bunko imprint, Media Factory's MF Bunko J imprint, Shogakukan's Gagaga Bunko imprint, and Shueisha's Jump Square magazine. The original concept was developed by Marvelous and a three-person unit of writers known as Speakeasy made up of Kōshi Tachibana, Sō Sagara and Wataru Watari. It launched in 2015 with several light novels, and a manga began serialization in Jump Square in 2016. An anime television series, produced by A-1 Pictures and directed by Kenichi Kawamura, aired between July and September 2016.

== Plot ==
The story takes place in a world where humankind is at war against an enemy called the "Unknown". Children who were evacuated to a cold sleep facility during the invasion by the Unknown several decades ago wake up from their slumber and learn that their bodies developed supernatural abilities called "World". In order to protect Japan from the Unknown emerging from the Tokyo Bay gate, the boys and girls wage battles for the defense of the cities in the Kantō region (Tokyo, Yokohama (Kanagawa), and Chiba).

== Characters ==
=== Main ===
Ichiya Suzaku (朱雀 壱弥, Suzaku Ichiya)
Voiced by: Soma Saito
Ichiya is the protagonist for Sonna Sekai wa Kowashiteshimae. A head student representative from Tokyo. He is a person with high confidence and thinks low of others, but probably due to him having terrible conversation skills. He shows respect to adults as older people have helped him in his childhood. It is hinted that he has romantic feelings toward his childhood friend, Canaria.
Canaria Utara (宇多良 カナリア, Utara Kanaria)
Voiced by: Yui Ishikawa
Canaria is the student representative from Tokyo and its sub-head. Canaria is Ichiya's childhood best friend who is actually a year older than him, but because she was late a year during the cold sleep, her age is now same as Ichiya. She affectionately calls Ichiya "Icchan". She is the only one whose staff can't fly, which means she has to be carried by other students whenever they engage in battle. She has romantic feelings toward Ichiya and it is hinted that their feelings are mutual.
Asuha Chigusa (千種 明日葉, Chigusa Asuha)
Voiced by: Chika Anzai
Asuha is the student representative and head of Chiba, and also Kasumi's younger sister.
Kasumi Chigusa (千種 霞, Chigusa Kasumi)
Voiced by: Yuma Uchida
Kasumi is the protagonist for Dōdemo Ii Sekai Nante. Student representative and sub-head of Chiba, he is Asuha's older brother whom she calls "Onii". He always has quarrels with Ichiya, although according to his sister this is because "he's only able to talk to people by replying in mean words", which is also why he can't stand Canaria. He usually holds the sniper position.
Maihime Tenkawa (天河 舞姫, Tenkawa Maihime)
Voiced by: Aoi Yūki
Maihime is the protagonist for Itsuka Sekai o Sukū Tame ni. Student representative and head of Kanagawa with a carefree and a bit childish personality, but is a good leader. She has godlike powers, but sometimes has no control over them.
Hotaru Rindō (凛堂 ほたる, Rindō Hotaru)
Voiced by: Ayaka Fukuhara
Hotaru is the student representative and sub-head of Kanagawa. She dotes and spoils her friend since childhood Maihime, whom she calls "Hime", too much to the point that she can't bear the moment she isn't with Maihime.

=== Others ===
Aoi Yaegaki (八重垣 青生, Yaegaki Aoi)
Voiced by: Sora Amamiya
Aoi is a student from Kanagawa who is part of the student administration. Her World is the ability to spread anything to a wide area.
Kyūtoku Asanagi (朝凪 求得, Asanagi Kyūtoku)
Voiced by: Hiroaki Hirata
Airi Yunami (夕浪 愛離, Yunami Airi)
Voiced by: Mamiko Noto
Zakuro Otonashi (音無 柘榴, Otonashi Zakuro)
Voiced by: Shiori Izawa
Ginko Sajihara (佐治原 銀呼, Sajihara Ginko)
Voiced by: Natsumi Fujiwara
Mahiru Ookuni (大國 真昼, Ookuni Mahiru)
Voiced by: Sayaka Ohara

== Media ==
=== Print ===
There are four Qualidea Code light novel series written by different authors. The first series is Kuzu to Kinka no Qualidea (クズと金貨のクオリディア), written by Sō Sagara and Wataru Watari, and illustrated by Saboten. Shueisha published the first volume on January 23, 2015. The second series is Itsuka Sekai o Sukū Tame ni: Qualidea Code (いつか世界を救うために -クオリディア・コード-), written by Kōshi Tachibana and illustrated by Kiyotaka Haimura. Fujimi Shobo has published two volumes between July 18, 2015, and January 20, 2016. The third series is Sonna Sekai wa Kowashiteshimae: Qualidea Code (そんな世界は壊してしまえ ‐クオリディア・コード‐), written by Sō Sagara and illustrated by Kantoku. Media Factory has published two volumes between October 23, 2015, and June 24, 2016. The fourth series is Dōdemo Ii Sekai Nante: Qualidea Code (どうでもいい 世界なんて ‐クオリディア・コード‐), written by Watari and illustrated by Saitom. Shogakukan published the first volume on July 20, 2016. A light novel adaptation of the anime series was published on August 25, 2016. A manga adaptation illustrated by Risō Maeda began serialization in Shueisha's Jump Square magazine in December 2016.

No.	Title	Japanese release date	Japanese ISBN
1	Kuzu to Kinka no Qualidea (クズと金貨のクオリディア)	January 23, 2015	978-4-08-631024-6
1–2	Itsuka Sekai o Sukū Tame ni: Qualidea Code (いつか世界を救うために -クオリディア・コード-)	July 18, 2015 (vol. 1); January 20, 2016 (vol. 2)	978-4-04-070611-5 (vol. 1); 978-4-04-070612-2 (vol. 2)
1–2	Sonna Sekai wa Kowashiteshimae: Qualidea Code (そんな世界は壊してしまえ ‐クオリディア・コード‐)	October 23, 2015 (vol. 1); June 24, 2016 (vol. 2)	978-4-04-067782-8 (vol. 1); 978-4-04-068318-8 (vol. 2)
1	Dōdemo Ii Sekai Nante: Qualidea Code (どうでもいい 世界なんて ‐クオリディア・コード‐)	July 20, 2016	978-4-09-451621-0

=== Anime ===
A 12-episode anime television series, produced by A-1 Pictures and directed by Kenichi Kawamura, aired between July 10 and September 25, 2016. (Note: Tokyo MX listed the series air dates on Saturday at 24:00, which is effectively Sunday at midnight JST.) The series was also streamed by Crunchyroll. The screenplay is written by a three-person unit of writers known as Speakeasy composed of Kōshi Tachibana, Sō Sagara and Wataru Watari. Hisayuki Tabata based the character design used in the anime on Matsuryu's original design. The music is composed by Taku Iwasaki. The first opening theme for episodes 2 to 8 is "Brave Freak Out" and the second opening theme for episodes 9 to 12 is "AxxxiS", both sung by LiSA. The first ending theme is "Gravity" by ClariS, the second ending theme is "Yakusoku -Promise Code-" (約束 -Promise code-, Promise -Promise Code-) by Garnidelia, and the third ending theme is "Clever" by ClariS and Garnidelia. The series was released on six BD and DVD compilation volumes between September 21, 2016, and February 22, 2017.

No.	Title (Note: All English titles are taken from Crunchyroll.)	Original release date
1	"Surviving World Gloria" "Zanzon Sekai no Guroria" (残存世界のグロリア)	July 10, 2016
2	"Deep Blue Caricature" "Konpeki no Karikachua" (紺碧のカリカチュア)	July 17, 2016
3	"Silent Aria" "Shinkan no Aria" (森閑のアリア)	July 24, 2016
4	"Canary in the Coal Mine" "Tankō no Kanaria" (炭鉱のカナリア)	July 31, 2016
5	"The Little Princess's Regalia" "Shōkōjo no Regaria" (小公女のレガリア)	August 7, 2016
6	"Memoria Salvation" "Guze no Memoria" (救世のメモリア)	August 14, 2016
7	"Rescue Paranoia" "Kyūsai no Paranoia" (救済のパラノイア)	August 21, 2016
8	"Inverse Qualia" "Hanten no Kuoria" (反転のクオリア)	August 28, 2016
9	"Jailbreak Idea" "Hangoku no Idea" (反獄のイデア)	September 4, 2016
10	"Compound Note Folklore" "Fukuin no Fōkuroa" (福音のフォークロア)	September 11, 2016
11	"Dipole Familia" "Sōkyoku Famiria" (双極ファミリア)	September 18, 2016
12	"Qualidea of the Radiant World" "Sanzen sekai no kuoridia" (燦然世界のクオリディア)	September 25, 2016

== Reception ==
Anime News Network (ANN) had four editors review the first episode of the anime: Paul Jensen and Nick Creamer gave similar praise and criticism to the battle sequences and cast of generic archetypes, with the former noting how the episode has a sense of humor about its given genre and the latter commending the writers for not rushing things to explain the series' universe through lengthy exposition or interpersonal character melodrama; Theron Martin praised the character interactions, setting and action scenes for having decent value to them but wanted to know more about the cast besides Ichiya and the direction being taken for the overall plot moving forward. The fourth reviewer, Rebecca Silverman, was critical of the story execution throughout the episode and the main cast having little in the way of engaging character traits or motivation for the viewers to care about them. Fellow ANN editor James Beckett reviewed the complete anime series in 2017. Despite giving praise to Mahime and Hotaru's arc in the middle third being fairly interesting and the workmanlike character designs, he criticized the series for its poorly planned execution of the plot towards the final third, underwritten characters lacking in engaging arcs and the technical aspects being only adequate at best, saying "[I]t isn't a terrible show, but it's about as unremarkable as an anime can be."
