= Mai Mizuhashi =

Japanese singer, member of GARNiDELiA

Mizuhashi Mai
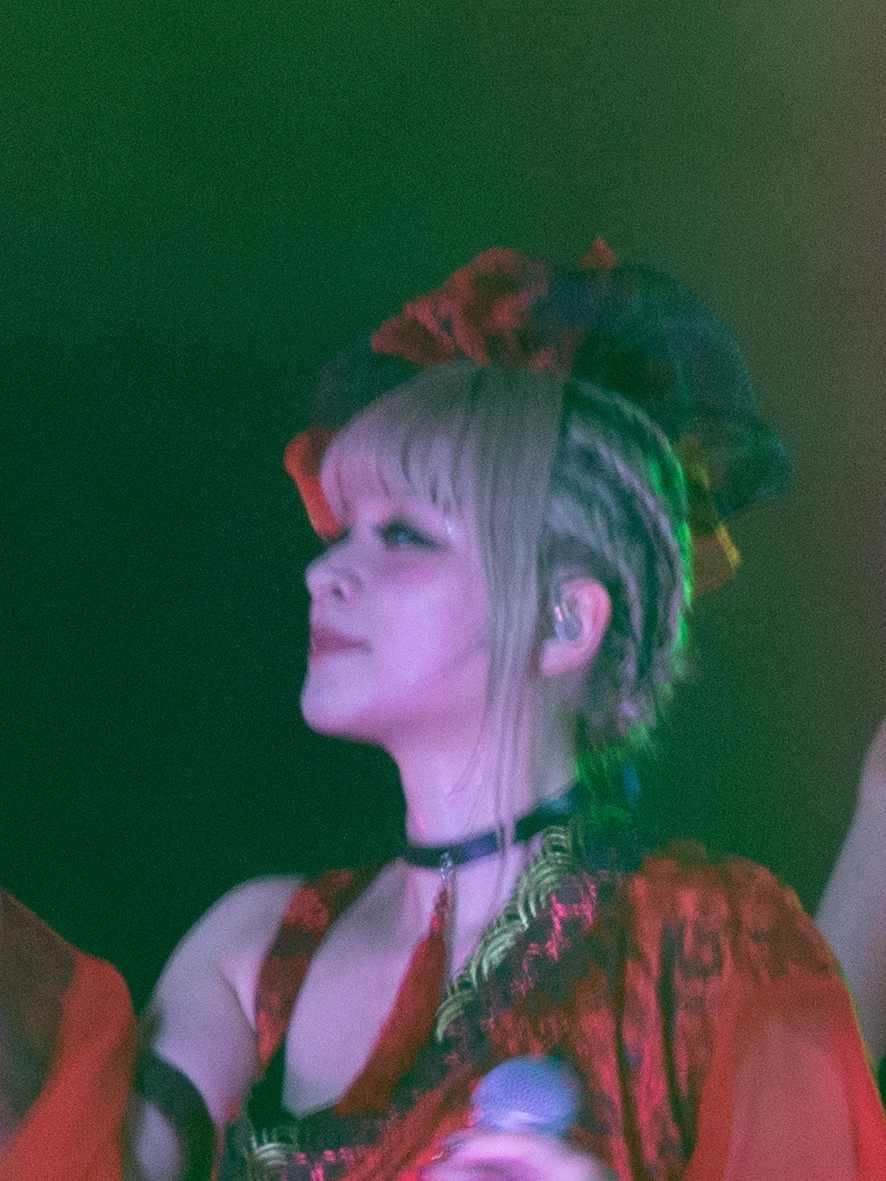
- Mizuhashi Mai performing at the Sakura Matsuri 2018 in Singapore

Background information
- Born: 水橋 舞 January 31, 1992 (age 34)
- Origin: Ibaraki Prefecture, Japan
- Genres: J-pop, Anison
- Occupations: Singer, songwriter, dancer, costume designer, model
- Years active: 2006–present
- Labels: Media Factory (2006–2011); Pony Canyon Inc. (2021–present)
- Website: www.garnidelia.com

Mai Mizuhashi (水橋 舞, Mizuhashi Mai; born January 31, 1992), better known by her stage name MARiA (メイリア 美依礼芽, Meiria), is a Japanese pop singer, songwriter, dancer, model and costume designer from Ibaraki Prefecture, Japan. Originally a member of a music group, Mizuhashi found fame posting videos on the Japanese website Niconico, and later gained viral popularity in Mainland China in 2018 after posting a dance video of her 2016 single "Gokuraku Jodo" on Bilibili. She is currently part of the pop rock duo Garnidelia.

== Biography ==
Mizuhashi began her career as a member of the music group Harajuku BJ Girls, later known as the Chix Chicks. While a member of the group, Mizuhashi performed a number of opening and ending themes for different anime series, such as "Brand New Morning", which was used as the opening theme to the 2006 anime television series Kamisama Kazoku, "Yumemiru Otome" (夢みる乙女; Dream Maiden), which was used as the ending theme to the 2007 anime television series Dōjin Work, and "Kaze no Message" (風のメッセージ; Message of the Wind), which was used as the second ending theme to the 2007 anime television series Pokémon: Diamond and Pearl.

Following Chix Chicks's disbandment in 2010, Mizuhashi pursued a solo career by posting videos on the Japanese website Niconico, where she caught the attention of music producer Yoshinori Abe, also known as Toku, also known as old man 4. Toku produced Mizuhashi's single "Color" which was used as the opening theme to the 2010 anime television series Freezing. The two would later form the music unit Garnidelia, which made its major debut in 2013 with the single "Ambiguous", used as the second opening theme to the anime television series Kill la Kill. Both attained popularity, particularly in China, with the success of their 2016 single Gokuraku Jodo.

=== Politics ===
In 2023, Mizuhashi participated in the fourth season of Sisters Who Make Waves. Against a backdrop of nationalism sentiments that were easily kindled in China when comes to diplomatic dealings between Japan and China, Mizuhashi was well-received by the Chinese public throughout the season. On July 23, 2023, at the season finale, she was ranked third among the 21 participants. In November 2025, amidst a diplomatic row between Japan and China, Mizuhashi posted "China is my second home, and my Chinese friends are my cherished family—I will always support One China".

== Discography ==
=== As MARiA ===
==== Studio-Albums ====
	Year	Album details	Track listing	Peak Oricon chart positions	Peak Billboard chart positions
1st	2021	Utamonogatari: Released: May 26, 2021; Label: Pony Canyon Inc. (PCCA-06037); Format: CD, CD+BD	1. Concourse; 2. Renaikanjo; 3. Garasu no Kane; 4. Orokamonogatari; 5. Matilda; 6. Kiss o Shitemiyoka; 7. Ah Kiyomomata; 8. Brand New Me; 9. Hikari; 10. Harugare	23	—
2nd	2022	Moments: Released: June 22, 2022; Label: Pony Canyon Inc. (PCCA-06135, PCCA-06134); Format: CD, CD+BD	1. Think Over; 2. Star Rock; 3. Long Distance; 4. Cafe Latte no Uta feat. Iuz; 5. Kimi to Itai; 6. Heartbreaker; 7. Galactic Wind; 8. Asterisk; 9. Pray; 10. Labyrinth	38	—
"—" denotes releases that did not chart.

==== Singles ====
	Release date	Title	Peak Oricon position	Album
1st	February 23, 2011	COLOR	35	BiRTHiA

==== Digital Singles ====
	Release date	Title	Album
1st	April 28, 2021	Concourse	Utamonogatari
2nd	October 13, 2021	Galactic Wind	Moments
3rd	June 9, 2022	Labyrinth	Moments
4th	June 15, 2022	Cafe Latte no Uta feat. Iuz	Moments
5th	October 16, 2022	Trust On Me -Theme of E.T.E- (with Tetsuya Komuro)	Non-album single

==== Indie-Albums ====
	Year	Album details	Track listing	Peak Oricon chart positions	Peak Billboard chart positions
1st	2012	aMazing MusiQue PaRK: Released: July 25, 2012	1. Another; 2. Girls; 3. We've gotta have a party!; 4. Daiippo (第一歩, First Step); 5. Aitaisei monorōgu (相対性モノローグ, Relativity Monologue); 6. Kimagure kettoshī (きまぐれケットシー, Whimsical Ket Sea); 7. Not Gonna Dump Me; 8. mere; 9. Thanks For…; 10. aMazing MusiQue PaRK	243	—
2nd	2013	MaBLE SYNDROMe: Released: August 13, 2013	1. WAVE; 2. Buriki No Dance (ブリキノダンス); 3. Just Be Friends; 4. Yobanashi Deceive (夜咄ディセイブ); 5. Noushou Sakuretsu Girl (脳漿炸裂ガール); 6. glow; 7. zephyr; 8. GALLOWS BELL; 9. Black★Rock Shooter (ブラック★ロックシューター); 10. 炉心融解 -melt down- (Junk Arrange feat.MARIA)	–	—
"—" denotes releases that did not chart.

==== Other appearances ====
List of guest appearances that feature MARiA
Title	Year	Album	Peak
Daze	2014	Daze / Days by Jin	3
Children Record	2015	Mekakucity M's 1 ~Mekakucity Actors Vocals and Sound Collection~ by Jin, LiSA	—N/a
Yobanashi Deceive	2015	Mekakucity M's 1 ~Mekakucity Actors Vocals and Sound Collection~ by Jin, LiSA	—N/a
Pray (Song. MARiA, CV: Miku Itō)	2021	Moments by MARiA	38
"—" denotes releases that did not chart.

=== As Mai Mizuhashi ===
==== Singles ====
	Release date	Title	Peak Oricon position
1st	January 25, 2006	Yumemiru Shanson Ningyō (夢見るシャンソン人形, Dreaming Chanson Doll)	–
2nd	September 3, 2006	Brand New Morning / Toshokande Wa Oshiete Kurenai Tenshi No (図書館では教えてくれない天使の秘密, The Secret of an Angel That The Library Does Not Tell)	–
3rd	April 25, 2007	Smile (スマイル)	–
4th	July 25, 2007	Yumemiru Otome (夢みる乙女, Dream Maiden)	157
5th	June 9, 2008	Kaze no Message (風のメッセージ, Message of the Wind)	48
"—" denotes releases that did not chart.
