= Bang Zoom! =

American audio recording studio

Bang Zoom! Studios
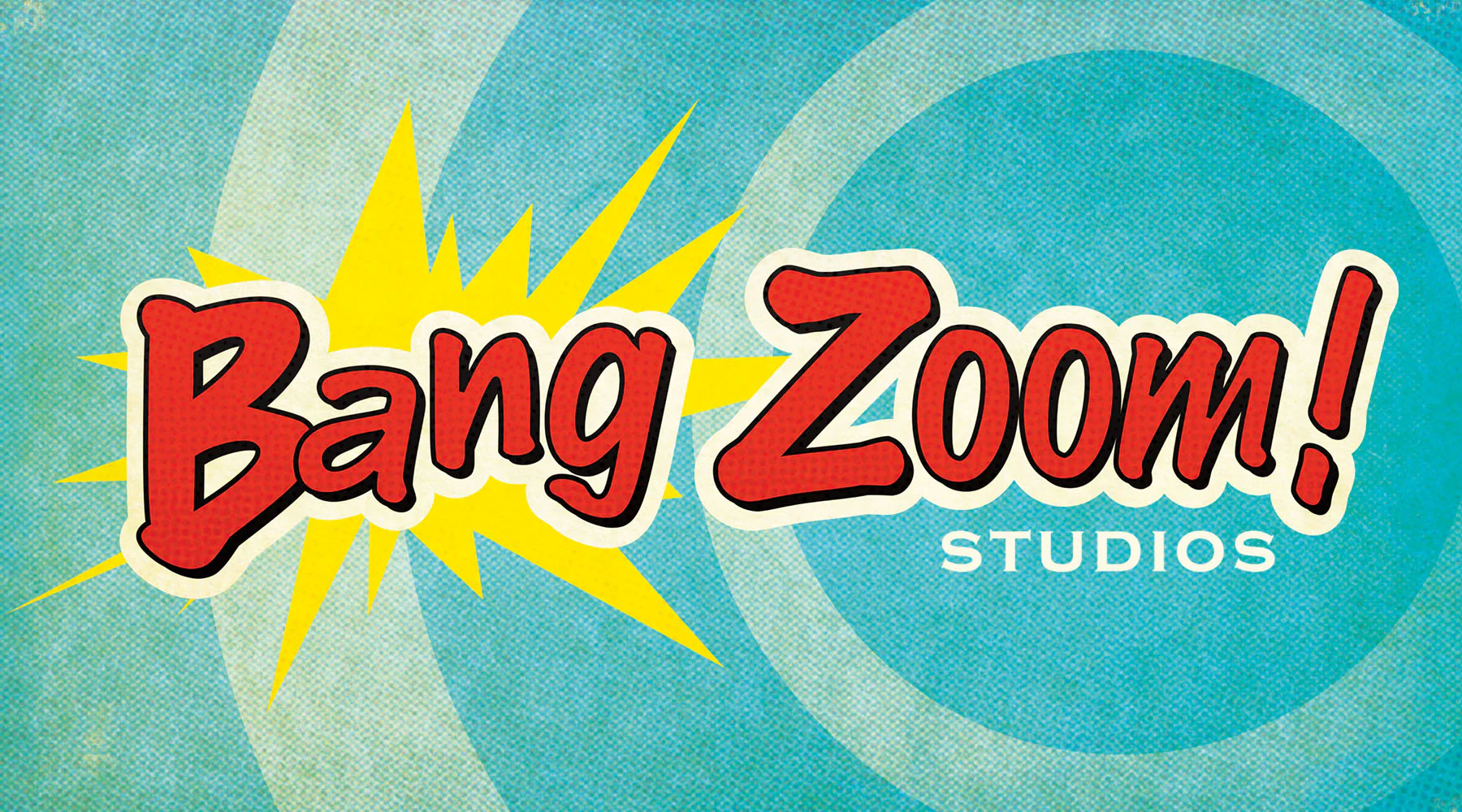
- Trade name: Bang Zoom! Studios
- Type: Private
- Industry: Voice recording, TV production, Distribution, Licensing, Dubbing
- Founded: 1993; 33 years ago
- Founder: Eric P. Sherman
- Headquarters: Burbank, California, U.S.
- Key people: Eric P. Sherman (President and CEO); Kaeko Sakamoto (Co-Founder); Mami Okada (Co-President/Casting Director); Jonathan Sherman (VP, Business Development); Mio Moroe (VP, Operations & Production)
- Website: www.bangzoomstudios.com

Bang Zoom! Studios is an American audio post-production studio with its headquarters in Burbank, California, in Greater Los Angeles. Founded in 1993, it has worked on anime, video games, television series, feature films, and original animation projects.

Their work for Lost in Oz won Bang Zoom! two Daytime Emmy Awards for Outstanding Sound Mixing and Outstanding Sound Editing.

== Adventures in Voice Acting ==
Bang Zoom! Entertainment released a series of interviews with "close to 100 [voice] actors, producers, and casting directors" on DVD, titled Adventures in Voice Acting: Anime, Games and Animation. Many of the interviews took place on set and in their respective studios.

== Production list ==
=== Anime ===
- 86 (Crunchyroll)
- A Lull in the Sea (NIS America)
- A.I.C.O. -Incarnation- (Netflix; 2nd release)
- Accel World (Viz Media)
- Ai Yori Aoshi (Geneon)
- Aika R-16: Virgin Mission (Bandai Entertainment)
- Akane-banashi (TV Asahi)
- Aldnoah.Zero (Aniplex of America)
- Anohana (Aniplex of America)
- Apocalypse Zero (Media Blasters)
- Arc the Lad (ADV Films)
- Argento Soma (Bandai Entertainment)
- Ascendance of a Bookworm (Crunchyroll)
- The Asterisk War (Aniplex of America)
- B – The Beginning (Netflix)
- Babel II - Beyond Infinity (Media Blasters)
- Berserk (Crunchyroll)
- Beyblade Burst Turbo (Hasbro/ADK Emotions NY)
- Beyblade Burst Rise (Hasbro/ADK Emotions NY)
- Beyblade Burst Surge (Hasbro/ADK Emotions NY)
- Beyblade Burst QuadDrive (Hasbro)
- Beyblade Burst QuadStrike (Hasbro)
- Beyblade X (Hasbro)
- Blade of the Immortal (Media Blasters)
- Blood Lad (Viz Media)
- Blue Exorcist (Aniplex of America)
- Bludgeoning Angel Dokuro-chan (Media Blasters)
- Burn-Up Scramble (Geneon)
- Carole & Tuesday (Netflix; released on home video by Sentai Filmworks)
- The Case Files of Lord El-Melloi II (Aniplex of America)
- Cells at Work! (Aniplex of America)
- Cells at Work! Code Black (Aniplex of America)
- Charlotte (Aniplex of America)
- Chobits (Geneon)
- Coppelion (Viz Media)
- Cosmo Warrior Zero (Media Blasters)
- Cyborg 009: Call of Justice (Netflix)
- D4DJ First Mix (Bushiroad)
- Dandadan (MBS Animation)
- Delicious in Dungeon (Netflix)
- Demon Slayer: Kimetsu no Yaiba (Aniplex of America)
- Detective Conan: The Culprit Hanzawa (Netflix)
- Detective Conan: Zero's Tea Time (Netflix)
- Don't Toy with Me, Miss Nagatoro (Crunchyroll)
- Doraemon (Fujiko Productions)
- Dragon Ball Super (Toei Animation Inc.)
- Dragon's Dogma (Netflix)
- Durarara!! (Aniplex of America)
- Edens Zero (season 1 only, Netflix)
- Engage Kiss (Aniplex of America)
- Eureka Seven (season 1 only, Bandai Entertainment)
- Erased (Aniplex of America)
- éX-Driver (OAV's: Media Blasters, Danger Zone & Movie: Geneon)
- Fafner in the Azure (season 1 only, Geneon)
- The Familiar of Zero (season 1 only, Geneon)
- Fate/Apocrypha (Netflix)
- Fate/Extra Last Encore (Netflix)
- Fate/Grand Order - Absolute Demonic Front: Babylonia (Aniplex of America)
- Fate/stay night (Geneon; Sentai Filmworks for Unlimited Blade Works movie)
- Fate/stay night: Unlimited Blade Works (Aniplex of America)
- Fate/Zero (Aniplex of America)
- Figure 17 (Media Blasters)
- FLAG (Bandai Entertainment)
- Fly Me to the Moon (Crunchyroll)
- Gad Guard (Geneon)
- Gankutsuou: The Count of Monte Cristo (Geneon)
- Gargantia on the Verdurous Planet (Viz Media)
- Gestalt (Media Blasters)
- Ghost in the Shell: SAC 2045 (Netflix)
- Ghost Slayers Ayashi (Bandai Entertainment)
- God Eater (Aniplex of America)
- Granblue Fantasy The Animation (season 1 only, Aniplex of America)
- Grenadier (Media Blasters)
- Ground Defense Force! Mao-chan (Geneon)
- Grow Up Show (Aniplex of America)
- Gun Frontier (Media Blasters)
- Gundam Build Divers (Sunrise)
- Gundam Build Divers Re:Rise (Sunrise)
- Gungrave (Geneon)
- Gurren Lagann (Bandai Entertainment; Aniplex of America for the movies)
- Hanaukyo Maid Team: La Verite (Geneon)
- Haré+Guu (AN Entertainment)
- Heat Guy J (Geneon)
- Here Is Greenwood (Media Blasters; 2004 dub)
- Hero Mask (Netflix)
- Heroes: Legend of the Battle Disks (MarVista Entertainment)
- Hunter × Hunter (2011) (Viz Media)
- I'll/CKBC (Media Blasters)
- Idol Project (Media Blasters)
- IGPX (Bandai Entertainment/Cartoon Network)
- In/Spectre (Crunchyroll)
- Ingress (Netflix)
- The Irregular at Magic High School (Aniplex of America)
- JoJo's Bizarre Adventure (Warner Bros. Entertainment)
- JoJo's Bizarre Adventure: Stardust Crusaders (Viz Media)
- JoJo's Bizarre Adventure: Diamond Is Unbreakable (Viz Media)
- JoJo's Bizarre Adventure: Golden Wind (Viz Media)
- JoJo's Bizarre Adventure: Stone Ocean (Netflix)
- Jungle de Ikou! (Media Blasters)
- K-On! (Bandai Entertainment for season 1; Sentai Filmworks for season 2 and the movie)
- Kakegurui (Netflix)
- Kannazuki no Miko (Geneon)
- Karas (Manga Entertainment)
- Katsugeki/Touken Ranbu (Aniplex of America)
- Kill Blue (Remow)
- Kill la Kill (Aniplex of America)
- Kimi ni Todoke (Netflix)
- KonoSuba (Crunchyroll)
- Kowloon Generic Romance (Bandai Namco Filmworks)
- Kurogane Communication (Media Blasters)
- Kuroko's Basketball (Netflix)
- Lagrange: The Flower of Rin-ne (Viz Media)
- Last Exile (season 1 only, Geneon)
- Love Hina (OAV's only, Bandai Entertainment)
- Love Live! School Idol Project (NIS America)
- Lucky ☆ Star (Bandai Entertainment)
- Lunar Legend Tsukihime (Geneon)
- Lupin the 3rd Part 6 (TMS Entertainment/Sentai Filmworks)
- Lycoris Recoil (Aniplex of America)
- Magi: The Labyrinth of Magic (Aniplex of America)
- Magi: Adventure of Sinbad (Netflix)
- Magia Record (Aniplex of America)
- Magic Knight Rayearth (Media Blasters)
- Magical Girl Lyrical Nanoha/Magical Girl Lyrical Nanoha A's (Geneon)
- Mahoromatic (Geneon; Sentai Filmworks for I'm Home)
- Mashle (Aniplex of America)
- Megalobox (season 1 only, Viz Media)
- March Comes In like a Lion (Aniplex of America)
- Mars Daybreak (Bandai Entertainment)
- The Melancholy of Haruhi Suzumiya (Bandai Entertainment)
- Mezzo Forte (Media Blasters)
- Mirage of Blaze (Media Blasters)
- Mission: Yozakura Family (Hulu)
- The Misfit of Demon King Academy (Aniplex of America)
- Mob Psycho 100 (seasons 1-2 only, Crunchyroll)
- Mobile Suit Gundam: Iron-Blooded Orphans (Sunrise)
- Moribito: Guardian of the Spirit (Media Blasters)
- My Love Story with Yamada-kun at Lv999 (Aniplex of America)
- New Getter Robo (Geneon)
- Nier: Automata Ver1.1a (Aniplex of America)
- Nightwalker (Central Park Media)
- Ninja Cadets (Media Blasters)
- Nura: Rise of the Yokai Clan (Viz Media)
- Occultic;Nine (Aniplex of America)
- Odd Taxi (Crunchyroll)
- Omishi Magical Theater: Risky Safety (AN Entertainment)
- One-Punch Man (Viz Media)
- Onmyōji (Netflix)
- Orient (Crunchyroll)
- Otogi Zoshi (Media Blasters)
- Overman King Gainer (Bandai Entertainment)
- Paradise Kiss (Geneon)
- Persona 4: The Animation (Sentai Filmworks)
- Le Portrait de Petit Cossette (Geneon)
- Phantom the Animation (Media Blasters)
- Planetes (Bandai Entertainment)
- Please Teacher! (Bandai Entertainment)
- Please Twins! (Bandai Entertainment)
- Pretty Boy Detective Club (Aniplex of America)
- The Promised Neverland (Aniplex of America)
- Puella Magi Madoka Magica (Aniplex of America)
- Puppet Princess (Media Blasters)
- Rascal Does Not Dream (Aniplex of America)
- Record of Grancrest War (Aniplex of America)
- Resident Evil: Infinite Darkness (Netflix)
- Re:Zero − Starting Life in Another World (Crunchyroll)
- The Rising of the Shield Hero (Crunchyroll)
- Rokka: Braves of the Six Flowers (Pony Canyon USA)
- Rozen Maiden (seasons 1-2 only, Geneon)
- Rurouni Kenshin (1996) (Media Blasters)
- Rurouni Kenshin (2023) (Aniplex of America)
- s-CRY-ed (Bandai Entertainment)
- Saiyuki Reload + Saiyuki Reload Gunlock (Geneon)
- Sakamoto Days (Netflix)
- Samurai Champloo (Geneon)
- Samurai Girl: Real Bout High School (Tokyopop)
- Samurai: Hunt for the Sword (Media Blasters)
- Scrapped Princess (Bandai Entertainment)
- Scott Pilgrim Takes Off (Netflix)
- The Seven Deadly Sins (Netflix)
- The Seven Deadly Sins: Four Knights of the Apocalypse (Netflix)
- Sirius the Jaeger (Netflix)
- Space Pirate Captain Herlock: The Endless Odyssey (Geneon)
- Squid Girl (season 1 only, Media Blasters)
- Stellvia (Geneon)
- Strait Jacket (Manga Entertainment)
- Sushi Ninja (Daisuki)
- Sword Art Online (Aniplex of America)
- Sword Art Online Alternative Gun Gale Online (Aniplex of America)
- Sword Gai (Netflix)
- Tenjho Tenge (Geneon)
- The Testament of Sister New Devil (Crunchyroll)
- Thus Spoke Rohan Kishibe (Netflix; released on home video by Viz Media)
- Tokko (Manga Entertainment)
- Tokyo 24th Ward (Aniplex of America)
- Toradora! (NIS America)
- Tougen Anki (Remow)
- Tweeny Witches (Media Blasters)
- The Grimm Variations (Wit Studio/Netflix)
- The Twelve Kingdoms (Media Blasters)
- Undead Unluck (TMS Entertainment/Viz Media)
- Uzumaki (Warner Bros. Entertainment)
- Vampire Knight (Viz Media)
- Vandread (Geneon)
- Vivy: Fluorite Eye's Song (Aniplex of America)
- Welcome to Demon School! Iruma-kun (Crunchyroll)
- When They Cry (season 1 only, Geneon)
- Wild Arms: Twilight Venom (ADV Films)
- Witch Hunter Robin (Bandai Entertainment)
- Witch Watch (MBS Animation)
- X (Geneon)
- Yaiba (Viz Media)
- Yashahime: Princess Half-Demon (Viz Media)
- Your Lie in April (Aniplex of America)
- Ys (Media Blasters)
- Yu-Gi-Oh!: ZeXal (only half series, unreleased)
- Yuki Yuna Is a Hero (season 1 only, Pony Canyon USA)
- Zom 100: Bucket List of the Dead (Viz Media)

=== Animation ===
- Arthur (seasons 16-25 only)
- Batwheels
- Bottersnikes and Gumbles
- Dota: Dragon's Blood
- Gisele Bündchen and the Green Team
- Guardians of the Galaxy
- Kindi Kids
- Kung Fu Pork Choppers (CraneKahn → Kidtagious Entertainment)
- Lego Friends
- Llama Llama
- Lost in Oz
- Martha and Friends
- Marvel Rising
- Rainbow Butterfly Unicorn Kitty
- Rick and Morty
- Secret Millionaires Club
- Spidey and His Amazing Friends
- Solar Opposites
- Tennis, the Good Boy
- ThunderCats Roar
- Transformers: Combiner Wars
- Transformers: Titans Return
- Transformers: Power of the Primes
- Trese
- YooHoo to the Rescue
- Young Justice: Outsiders
- Young Justice: Phantoms
- Zuzubaland

=== Films ===
==== Anime ====
- 5 Centimeters Per Second (Bandai Entertainment/CoMix Wave Films; 2011 dub)
- Arc the Lad (ADV Films)
- Bubble (Netflix/Wit Studio)
- Cardcaptor Sakura: The Movie 2 - The Sealed Card (Geneon)
- Demon Slayer: Kimetsu no Yaiba – The Movie: Mugen Train (Aniplex of America)
- Demon Slayer: Kimetsu no Yaiba – To the Swordsmith Village (Aniplex of America)
- Demon Slayer: Kimetsu no Yaiba – To the Hashira Training (Aniplex of America)
- The Disappearance of Haruhi Suzumiya (Bandai Entertainment)
- Fate/Grand Order: Final Singularity-Grand Temple of Time: Solomon (Aniplex of America)
- Fate/stay night: Heaven's Feel I. presage flower (Aniplex of America)
- Fate/stay night: Heaven's Feel II. lost butterfly (Aniplex of America)
- Fate/stay night: Heaven's Feel III. spring song (Aniplex of America)
- Fate/stay night: Unlimited Blade Works (2010 film) (Sentai Filmworks)
- Gamba: Gamba to Nakama-tachi (Air Bound) (Lionsgate)
- Giovanni's Island (Production I.G)
- Gundress (Media Blasters)
- Hunter × Hunter: Phantom Rouge (Viz Media)
- Hunter × Hunter: The Last Mission (Viz Media)
- Kingsglaive: Final Fantasy XV (Square Enix/Sony Pictures)
- Kite Liberator (Media Blasters)
- Kuroko's Basketball The Movie: Last Game (Production I.G/Netflix)
- The Laws of the Universe: Part 0 (Eleven Arts)
- Love Live! The School Idol Movie (NIS America)
- Lupin III: Jigen's Gravestone (TMS Entertainment/Discotek Media)
- Mobile Suit Gundam F91 (Bandai Entertainment)
- Ninokuni (OLM, Inc./Warner Bros. Japan/Netflix)
- Oblivion Island: Haruka and the Magic Mirror (Production I.G)
- Rascal Does Not Dream of a Dreaming Girl (Aniplex of America)
- Rascal Does Not Dream of a Sister Venturing Out (Aniplex of America)
- Rascal Does Not Dream of a Knapsack Kid (Aniplex of America)
- Redline (Manga Entertainment)
- Resident Evil: Damnation (Capcom/Sony Pictures)
- Resident Evil: Vendetta (Marza/Sony Pictures)
- Sakura Wars: The Movie (Geneon)
- Stand by Me Doraemon (Fujiko Productions/Viz Media)
- Stand by Me Doraemon 2 (Toho/Netflix)
- Suzume (Sony Pictures)
- Sword Art Online The Movie: Ordinal Scale (Aniplex of America)
- Sword Art Online Progressive: Aria of a Starless Night (Aniplex of America)
- Sword Art Online Progressive: Scherzo of Deep Night (Aniplex of America)
- Puella Magi Madoka Magica: The Movie (Aniplex of America)
- Tekken: Blood Vengeance (Bandai Entertainment)
- Treasure Island (TMS Entertainment)

==== Animation ====
- Beyond Beyond
- Dive Olly Dive and the Pirate Treasure
- Hoodwinked Too! Hood vs. Evil
- Marvel Rising: Secret Warriors
- Lalaloopsy Girls: Welcome to L.A.L.A. Prep School
- Postman Pat: The Movie
- Stan Lee's Mighty 7
- Twinkle Toes: Lights Up New York
- The Adventures of Panda Warrior
- Arctic Adventure: On Frozen Pond

=== Video games ===
- .hack//G.U. Vol.2//Reminisce (Bandai/Bandai Namco Games)
- .hack//G.U. Vol.3//Redemption (Bandai/Bandai Namco Games)
- Ace Combat 7: Skies Unknown (Bandai Namco Games)
- Ace Combat Infinity (Bandai Namco Games)
- Age of Elements (Atari)
- AI: The Somnium Files (Spike Chunsoft)
- AI: The Somnium Files – Nirvana Initiative (Spike Chunsoft)
- Anonymous;Code (Spike Chunsoft)
- Ar tonelico Qoga: Knell of Ar Ciel (NIS America)
- Atelier Ayesha: The Alchemist of Dusk (Tecmo Koei)
- Atelier Escha & Logy: Alchemists of the Dusk Sky (Tecmo Koei)
- Atelier Firis: The Alchemist and the Mysterious Journey (Tecmo Koei)
- Atelier Shallie: Alchemists of the Dusk Sea (Tecmo Koei)
- Atelier Sophie: The Alchemist of the Mysterious Book (Tecmo Koei)
- Ben 10 Alien Force: The Rise of Hex (Konami Digital Entertainment)
- Blazing Souls Accelate (Idea Factory)
- Crimson Dragon (Microsoft Studios)
- D4: Dark Dreams Don't Die (Microsoft Studios)
- Danganronpa: Trigger Happy Havoc (NIS America)
- Danganronpa 2: Goodbye Despair (NIS America)
- Danganronpa 2x2 (Spike Chunsoft)
- Danganronpa Another Episode: Ultra Despair Girls (NIS America)
- Demon Slayer: Kimetsu no Yaiba – The Hinokami Chronicles (Sega)
- Detective Pikachu (Nintendo/The Pokémon Company)
- Detective Pikachu Returns (Nintendo/The Pokémon Company)
- Digimon All-Star Rumble (Bandai Namco Games)
- Disgaea 5: Alliance of Vengeance (NIS America)
- Disgaea 7: Vows of the Virtueless (NIS America)
- Earth Defense Force 2025 (D3 Publisher)
- Earthworm Jim (Sega)
- Eureka Seven vol.1: New Wave (Bandai/Bandai Namco Games)
- Eureka Seven vol. 2: The New Vision (Bandai/Bandai Namco Games)
- Fairy Fencer F (NIS America)
- Fat Princess Adventures
- Friday the 13th: The Game (Gun Media)
- Gods Eater Burst (D3 Publisher)
- Growlanser Generations (Working Designs)
- Hyperdimension Neptunia series (Idea Factory)
- IGPX (Bandai/Bandai Namco Games)
- Inazuma Eleven (Level-5)
- Kill la Kill: If (Arc System Works)
- Killer Instinct (Microsoft Studios)
- King's Quest (Sierra Entertainment)
- League of Legends (Riot Games)
- LittleBigPlanet Karting (Sony Computer Entertainment)
- Magna Carta 2 (Bandai Namco Games)
- Majin and the Forsaken Kingdom (Bandai Namco Games)
- Mugen Souls Z (NIS America)
- New Pokémon Snap (Nintendo/The Pokémon Company)
- Oreca Battle (Konami)
- Pac-Man and the Ghostly Adventures (Bandai Namco Games)
- Pokémon Masters EX (DeNA)
- Power Rangers Super Megaforce (Bandai Namco Games)
- Re:Zero − Starting Life in Another World: The Prophecy of the Throne (Spike Chunsoft)
- Rocket Knight (localization only) (Konami)
- Rune Factory Frontier (XSEED Games/Marvelous USA)
- Rune Factory 4 (XSEED Games/Marvelous USA)
- Sakura Wars: So Long, My Love (NIS America)
- Samurai Champloo: Sidetracked (Bandai/Bandai Namco Games)
- Section 8 (SouthPeak Games)
- Sly Cooper: Thieves in Time (Sony Computer Entertainment)
- StarCraft II: Wings of Liberty (Blizzard Entertainment)
- Stargate SG-1: Unleashed (MGM Interactive)
- Summon Night 6: Lost Borders (Bandai Namco Games)
- The Amazing Spider-Man 2 (Activision)
- The Texas Chain Saw Massacre (Gun Interactive)
- The Unfinished Swan (Sony Computer Entertainment)
- The Witch and the Hundred Knight (NIS America)
- Time and Eternity (NIS America)
- The Legend of Heroes: Trails in the Sky (XSEED Games)
- Trinity Universe (NIS America)
- World of Warcraft: Legion (Blizzard Entertainment)
- X-Men (Konami)

=== Live-action dubbing ===
- Alive (Media Blasters)
- Apokalips X (Action Slate Releasing)
- Attack the Gas Station (Media Blasters)
- Bio Zombie (Media Blasters)
- Blowback: Love & Death (Central Park Media)
- Chingu 2 (CJ Entertainment)
- Danger Dolls (Action Slate Releasing)
- Death Kappa (Media Blasters)
- Dead Sushi (Action Slate Releasing)
- Death Trance (Media Blasters)
- Fists of Legend (CJ Entertainment)
- Flu (CJ Entertainment)
- Friend 2: The Legacy (CJ Entertainment)
- JU-ON: Origins (Netflix)
- The Ladies' Phone Club (Central Park Media)
- Little Sister (Miramax)
- Love Alarm (Netflix)
- Masquerade (CJ Entertainment)
- The Mysterians (Media Blasters)
- The Neighbor No. 13 (Media Blasters)
- Nowhere Man (Netflix)
- One Missed Call (Media Blasters)
- Operation Chromite (CJ Entertainment)
- Reborn from Hell series (Media Blasters)
- Sky High (Media Blasters)
- The Son (Netflix)
- Sumo Vixens (Central Park Media)
- Terminatrix (Central Park Media)
- Tokyo Decameron (Central Park Media)
- Tokyo Mafia series (Central Park Media)
- Tokyo Zombie (Manga Entertainment)
- The Age of Shadows (CJ Entertainment)
- The Tower (CJ Entertainment)
- The Tree of Blood (Netflix)
- Versus (Media Blasters)
- Weather Woman (Central Park Media)
- Yohan: The Child Wanderer (Penelope Films)
- Zeiram 2 (Media Blasters)
- Zero Woman (Media Blasters)
- Zero Woman: Assassin Lovers (Central Park Media)

=== Post-Production Sound Services ===
- Black Lightning (TV Series)
- Gleason
- Legends of Tomorrow
- NCIS: New Orleans
- Scorpion (TV Series) (Seasons 1-2)
- Supergirl (TV Series)
- The Flash (2014 TV Series)

== Recent years ==
On April 26, 2010, Bang Zoom! Entertainment CEO Eric P. Sherman sent an open letter to anime fans via blog GoAnimeTV. In the letter, he stated that the company will most likely stop producing English dubs of anime titles in 2011 if the industry does not start showing improvement. He cited the fansubbing and unlicensed copying of anime content as the primary reason for Geneon Entertainment USA, Urban Vision, Central Park Media, Tokyopop, and ADV Films closing their doors, as well as the January 2009 layoffs at Bandai Entertainment. Sherman also emphasized in the article that "anime is going to die" if fans do not start buying more content from the studios that license shows for distribution.
