= Kill Blue =

Japanese manga series

- First tankōbon volume cover, featuring Juzo Ogami

キルアオ (Kiru Ao)
- Genre: Action; Comedy
- Manga
- Written by: Tadatoshi Fujimaki
- Published by: Shueisha
- English publisher: NA: Viz Media
- Imprint: Jump Comics
- Magazine: Weekly Shōnen Jump
- Original run: April 17, 2023 – September 1, 2025
- Volumes: 13
- Anime television series
- Directed by: Hiro Kaburagi (animation supervisor); Yasunori Ide (animation director)
- Written by: Hiro Kaburagi
- Music by: Ryo Konishi
- Studio: Cue
- Licensed by: Remow
- Original network: TXN (TV Tokyo)
- Original run: April 11, 2026 – present
- Episodes: 12
- icon

Kill Blue (Japanese: キルアオ, Hepburn: Kiru Ao) is a Japanese manga series written and illustrated by Tadatoshi Fujimaki. It was serialized in Shueisha's Weekly Shōnen Jump magazine from April 2023 to September 2025, with its chapters collected in thirteen tankōbon volumes. An anime television series adaptation produced by Cue premiered aired from April to June 2026. A second season has been announced.

== Plot ==
Juzo Ogami is a 39-year-old who works for the Z.O.O. assassin syndicate as their prized hitman. During a job taking out criminals working with the genetic manipulation company Mitsuoka Pharmaceuticals, Ogami is stung by a wasp that modifies his DNA, regressing his age to that of when he was 13. Unable to resume work as a hitman due to his stature, the head of Z.O.O. gives Ogami another assignment while they work on an antidote: attend a middle school the head's daughter is applying to and judge if it is safe. Ogami, due to having no formal education, turns out to love middle school, and must balance his time as a student and an assassin. He must also deal with Noren Mitsuoka, the heiress of Mitsuoka Pharmaceuticals, who may be the key to figuring out how to age Ogami back to normal.

== Characters ==
Juzo Ogami (大狼 十三, Ōgami Jūzō)
Voiced by: Shunsuke Takeuchi (adult), Yūko Sanpei (young) (Japanese); Ray Chase (adult), Caitlyn Elizabeth (young) (English)
A 39-year-old assassin who is aged back to 13 years old after being stung by a mysterious wasp during a mission. Initially not liking the idea of going back to middle school, he soon comes to enjoy it. His skill with a handgun has earned him the nickname "Demon's Left Hand".
Kotatsu Nekota (猫田 コタツ, Nekota Kotatsu)
Voiced by: Shūichirō Umeda (Japanese); Khoi Dao (English)
Ogami's partner. Although not nearly as experienced as Ogami, he is skilled with technology, and has more skill in cooking and house care. He created the pair of glasses that Ogami wears that acts as a camera and radio for him.
Eri Wanibuchi (鰐淵 瑛里, Wanibuchi Eri)
Voiced by: Yumi Uchiyama (Japanese); Dawn M. Bennett (English)
Ogami's ex-wife who is the head of Z.O.O.'s science department.
Noren Mitsuoka (蜜岡 ノレン, Mitsuoka Noren)
Voiced by: Fūka Izumi (Japanese); Kayli Mills (English)
A middle school student and the daughter of Mitsuoka Pharmaceuticals founder. She is constantly hit on by other students, causing her to initially hate men, before befriending Ogami. She helps out her uncle at his ramen shop, and wishes to take it over when he retires.
Chisato Shiraishi (白石 千里, Shiraishi Chisato)
Voiced by: Atsumi Tanezaki (Japanese); Kira Buckland (English)
A third-year middle school student who is the head of the Home Economics Club. She is affectionately referred to as "Capo" (アネゴ, Anego).
Shin Kohazame (古波鮫 シン, Kohazame Shin)
Voiced by: Daisuke Sakuma (Japanese); Brian Timothy Anderson (English)
An assassin associated with Yugang, a Chinese organization, who is Ogami and Noren's classmate. Due to his tendency of being nervous, he often uses a pacifier to calm himself down.
Tenma Tendo (天童 天馬, Tendo Tenma)
Voiced by: Takeo Ōtsuka (Japanese); Clifford Chapin (English)
A second-year middle school student who is a three-way athlete known as "The Triple Threat". Due to his versatility and abilities, he is a member of "Unicorn", an elite group of students.
Kazuma Rindou (竜胆 カズマ, Rindō Kazuma)
Voiced by: Shōya Chiba (Japanese); Brandon McInnis (English)
A Black-Rank assassin associated with JARDIN. He is skilled in hypnotism.
Eiji Rindou (竜胆 エイジ, Rindō Eiji)
Voiced by: Yoshiki Nakajima (Japanese); Grant George (English)
A Black-Rank assassin associated with JARDIN who is Kazuma's younger brother. He has tremendous physical strength and is a skilled golfer.
Mai Otohime (乙姫 舞, Otohime Mai)
Voiced by: Ikumi Hasegawa (Japanese); Riley Fussenegger (English)
A first-year student who is a member of Unicorn due to her specializing in marine sports. Known as "The Mermaid Queen", she has a split personality that switches when she sleeps. One personality is meek and gentle, while the other is energetic and prideful. She has a crush of Ogami, unaware that he is really a middle-aged man.

== Media ==
=== Manga ===
Written and illustrated by Tadatoshi Fujimaki, Kill Blue was serialized in Shueisha's Weekly Shōnen Jump magazine from April 17, 2023, to September 1, 2025. The series' individual chapters have been collected into thirteen tankōbon volumes, released from September 4, 2023, to December 4, 2025.

Viz Media and Manga Plus simultaneously published the series in English with its Japanese release. Viz Media began releasing the volumes digitally in Summer 2024.

==== Volumes ====
No.	Original release date	Original ISBN	English release date	English ISBN
1	September 4, 2023	978-4-08-883686-7	July 23, 2024 (digital); June 3, 2025 (print)	978-1-9747-4419-0 (digital); 978-1-9747-5613-1 (print)
1. "Let's Go to School" (学校へ行こう, Gakkō e Ikō); 2. "The Wisdom of Others" (爪の垢でも煎じて飲め, Tsume no Aka demo Senjite Nome); 3. "Noren Mitsuoka" (蜜岡ノレン, Mitsuoka Noren); 4. "You Can't Play Around Like This!" (こんなふうに遊んじゃダメだよ, Konna Fū ni Asonja Dame da yo); 5. "Wipe Your Own Butt" (自分のケツは自分で拭け, Jibun no Ketsu wa Jibun de Fuke); 6. "Morally Unacceptable" (道徳(モラル)的に無理, Moraru-teki ni Muri); 7. "Middle-Aged Obstinacy" (オジサンは意地っぱり, Ojisan wa Ijippari)
2	November 2, 2023	978-4-08-883737-6	October 22, 2024 (digital); August 5, 2025 (print)	978-1-9747-5068-9
8. "I Ain't Giving You Noren" (ノレンはやれん, Noren wa Yaren); 9. "Pacifier Battle" (おしゃぶり決闘(バトル), Oshaburi Batoru); 10. "Midterms and Mama" (中間考査(テスト)とママ, Chūkan Tesuto to Mama); 11. "And We Came Upon a Unicorn" (行った先には幻獣組(ユニコーン), Itta Saki ni wa Yunikōn); 12. "Sparks on the Soccer Field" (バチバチフットサル, Bachi Bachi Futtosaru); 13. "The Thrill of Futsal" (ワクワクフットサル, Waku Waku Futtosaru); 14. "Is It So Hard to Say Thank You?" (ちゃんとありがとう言わんかい, Chanto Arigatō Iwankai); 15. "Conclusions and Propositions" (決着&告白, Ketchaku ando Kokuhaku); 16. "Up Against the Wall" (詰んだ, Tsunda)
3	January 4, 2024	978-4-08-883797-0	October 14, 2025 (print)	978-1-9747-5911-8
17. "Doki Doki Double Date" (ドキドキダブルデート, Doki Doki Daburu Dēto); 18. "Doki Doki Tag Match" (ドキドキタッグマッチ, Doki Doki Taggu Matchi); 19. "Secret's Out" (バレた, Bareta); 20. "Vs. The Brothers Rindou" (VS竜胆兄弟, Bāsasu Rindō Kyōdai); 21. "True Experts Wing It" (凄腕は考えない, Sugoude wa Kangaenai); 22. "Drowsy Noren" (寝ぼけノレン, Neboke Noren); 23. "No Beating an Unbeatable Game" (無理ゲー事後処理やっぱ無理, Murigē Jigo Shori Yappa Muri); 24. "Stark Raving Noren" (暴走ノレン, Bōsō Noren); 25. "Death or Kiss"
4	April 4, 2024	978-4-08-883881-6	December 9, 2025	978-1-9747-5912-5
26. "First Hitman Summit" (第一回殺し屋会議(サミット), Dai-ichi-kai Koroshiya Samitto); 27. "Don't Pat My Head" (なでるな頭を, Naderuna Atama o); 28. "Life Paths" (進路, Shinro); 29. "Warrin' Noren" (コキノレン, Koki Noren); 30. "We're Gonna Do It!" (...行っちゃう?, ...Itchau?); 31. "Home Ec Club Rides the Waves" (波乗り家庭科部, Naminori Kateikabu); 32. "Noren's Revelation" (悟りノレン, Satori Noren); 33. "Home Ec Club Doesn't Ride the Waves" (波乗れない家庭科部, Naminorenai Kateikabu); 34. "Playing at Night When We Can't Surf" (夜はサーフィンできないから遊ぶんだ, Yoru wa Sāfin Dekinai kara Asobunda)
5	June 4, 2024	978-4-08-884109-0	February 3, 2026	978-1-9747-6202-6
35. "The Beach Trip's End" (海合宿完了, Umi Gasshuku Kanryō); 36. "Determined Noren" (決意ノレン, Ketsui Noren); 37. "Mitsuoka Challenge Surfing Battle" (ミツオカ決闘サーフィン対決, Mitsuoka Kettō Sāfin Taiketsu); 38. "Ladies' Match" (女の戦い, Onna no Tatakai); 39. "Fight and Make Up, as Friends Do" (戦って仲直りしたら友達でしょ, Tatakatte Nakanaori Shitara Tomodachi Desho); 40. "The Disciplinarian and the Killer" (風紀委員と殺し屋, Fūkiin to Koroshiya); 41. "Stuffies and Evil" (ぬいぐるみと悪, Nuigurumi to Aku); 42. "Sentimental Ogami" (センチメンタル大狼, Senchimentaru Ōgami); 43. "Even If This Is the End..." (これで終わりだとしても, Korede Owarida to Shitemo)
6	August 2, 2024	978-4-08-884129-8	April 7, 2026	978-1-97-476203-3
44. "A Ride on the Hit Man Express" (乗り込め春電バス, Norikome Haruden Basu); 45. "Yoshitsune and Johnny" (ヨシツネとジョニー, Yoshitsune to Jonī); 46. "Keep Your Hands Off the Home Ec Club" (家庭科部には手を出すな, Kateikabu ni wa Te o Dasuna); 47. "Keep Your Hands Off the Home Ec Club, Part 2" (家庭科部には手を出すな②, Kateikabu ni wa Te o Dasuna 2); 48. "Vs. JARDIN, Round 2"; 49. "The Legend vs. the Best" (伝説(レジェンド)VS最強(ベスト), Rejendo Bāsasu Besuto); 50. "The Legend vs. the Best, Part 2" (伝説(レジェンド)VS最強(ベスト)②, Rejendo Bāsasu Besuto 2); 51. "Conclusions" (決着, Ketchaku); 52. "Out of the Frying Pan" (一難去って, Ichinan Satte)
7	November 1, 2024	978-4-08-884252-3	June 9, 2026	978-1-9747-6362-7
53. "Vacation Home" (別荘へ行こう, Bessō e Ikō); 54. "The Mitsuoka Vacation Home Hexagon Manor Murder Case" (蜜岡別荘六角館殺人事件, Mitsuoka Bessō Rokkakukan Satsujin Jiken); 55. "The Night Pool & the Sealed Door" (ナイトプールと開かずの扉, Naitopūru Akazu no Tobira); 56. "The Mitsuoka Dungeon" (ミツオカダンジョン, Mitsuoka Danjon); 57. "The Mitsuoka Dungeon, Part 2" (ミツオカダンジョン②, Mitsuoka Danjon 2); 58. "The Mitsuoka Dungeon, Part 3" (ミツオカダンジョン③, Mitsuoka Danjon 3); 59. "The Mitsuoka Dungeon, Part 4" (ミツオカダンジョン④, Mitsuoka Danjon 4); 60. "The Mitsuoka Dungeon, Part 5" (ミツオカダンジョン⑤, Mitsuoka Danjon 5); 61. "On the Outs" (犬も食わない, Inu mo Kuwanai)
8	January 4, 2025	978-4-08-884441-1	August 11, 2026	978-1-9747-6519-5
62. "Love Love Album" (ラブラブアルバム, Rabu Rabu Arubamu); 63. "The End of Summer Vacation"; 64. "Cherry Blossom Garden" (桜の庭, Sakura no Niwa); 65. "A Meeting with Principal Oka" (桜花×大狼 対談, Ōka Ōgami Taidan); 66. "Here Come the New Challengers"; 67. "Reasons of Their Own" (それぞれの決意, Sorezore no Ketsui); 68. "Cavalry Battle"; 69. "Opening Moves" (開戦, Kaisen); 70. "Shin Kohazame vs. Jinta Domeki" (古波鮫シンVS百目鬼甚太, Kohazame Bāsasu Dōmeki Jinta)
9	April 4, 2025	978-4-08-884442-8	October 6, 2026	978-1-9747-6539-3
71. "Juzo Ogami vs. Hijiri Yatsurugi" (大狼十三VS八剣聖, Ōgami Jūzō Bāsasu Hijiri Yatsurugi); 72. "Nice One, Ogami!" (ナイスだね!大狼くん, Naisu da ne! Ōgami-kun); 73. "I Hate You Out of Love" (嫌いだけど好きだから, Kirai Dakedo Suki Dakara); 74. "Settled" (決着, Ketchaku); 75. "Natsukiya and Noren" (夏木屋とノレンNatsukiya to Noren); 76. "FuwaCure Fiction" (ふわきゅあふぃくしょん, Fuwakyua Fikushon); 77. "Make Me a Themed Cafe, Maggots!" (文化祭だコンカフェやんぞこのやろう, Bunkasai da Konkafe Yanzo Kono Yarō); 78. "We're Not Selling Our Souls Here" (別に魂なんて売ってないにゃん, Betsu ni Tamashii nante Uttenai Nyan); 79. "Full-Throttle Home Ec Club" (全開家庭科部, Senkai Kanteikabu)
10	June 4, 2025	978-4-08-884562-3	December 1, 2026	978-1-9747-6575-1
80. "Come One, Come All to the Bonus Scramble!" (あつまれ!ボーナス争奪戦!!, Atsumare! Bōnasu Sōdatsudan!!); 81. "I Will Eat This Tsukemen" (つけ麺を食うのだ, Tsukemen o Kū no Da); 82. "Culture Festival Epilogue" (文化祭エピローグ, Bunkasai Epirōgu); 83. "Kakeru Inukai" (犬飼カケル, Inukai Kakeru); 84. "Spicy Ginger Ale" (辛口ジンジャエール, Karakuchi Jinja Ēru); 85. "Siscon vs. Tunacorn" (シスコーン対ツナコーン, Shisukōn Tai Tsunakōn); 86. "Ogami on Offense" (大狼急襲, Ōgami Kyūshū); 87. "Decisive Battle" (決戦, Kessen); 88. "The End of the Legendary Hit Man" (伝説の殺し屋の最期, Densetsu no Koroshiya Saigo)
11	September 4, 2025	978-4-08-884654-5	—	—
89. "Hate" (大っ嫌い, Daikkirai); 90. "Meeting Her Father" (挨拶に行こう, Aisatsu ni Ikō); 91. "Engagement Conditions" (婚約の条件, Kon'yaku no Jōken); 92. "No Misunderstanding" (勘違いじゃなかった, Kanchigai ja Nakatta); 93. "Noren at the Brink" (テンパりノレン, Tenpari Noren); 94. "Middle School Student Council" (六花学園中学校生徒会, Rikka Gakuen Chūgakkō Seitokai); 95. "Out of Your League" (100年早い, Hyaku-nen Hayai); 96. "Chisato Shiraishi vs. Juzo Ogami" (白石千里VS大狼十三, Shiraishi Chisato Bāsasu Ōgami Jūzō); 97. "Only a Trainee" (見習いだけど, Minarai Dakedo)
12	November 4, 2025	978-4-08-884741-2	—	—
98. "Right Every Time, Some of the Time" (当たるも八卦当たらぬも八卦, Ataru mo Hakke Ataranu mo Hakke); 99. "Real Mature, Dude" (大人気なくない, Otonagenakunai); 100. "You've Got Pluck, Home Ec Club" (いい度胸だぜ家庭科部, Ii Dokyō da ze Kateikabu); 101. "Sir, Yes Sir!"; 102. "Let the Battle Begin!" (戦闘開始(ゲームスタート)!!, Gēmu Sutāto); 103. "Over My Dead Body" (俺の屍を超えてゆけ, Ore no Shikabane o Koete Yuke); 104. "Caught Off Guard" (一泡吹かせてやる, Hitoawafu Kaseteyaru); 105. "Subaru Ichijo" (一条昴, Ichijō Subaru); 106. "The Win Is Yours" (君達の勝ちだ, Kimitachi no Kachi da)
13	December 4, 2025	978-4-08-884809-9	—	—
107. "Naked Camaraderie" (裸の付き合い, Hadaka no Tsukiai); 108. "Thank You" (ありがとう, Arigatō); 109. "Farewell" (さよなら, Sayonara); 110. "Counterattack" (逆襲, Gyakushū); 111. "Mitsuoka Dungeon Battle (ミツオカダンジョンバトル, Mitsuoka Danjon Batoru); 112. "Don't Sweat the Details" (細けぇことは気にすんな, Komakee Koto wa Kinisunna); 113. "Noren Hosho" (宝生ノレン, Hōshō Noren); 114. "Final Secret" (最後の秘密, Saigo no Himitsu); 115. "So Long, Juzo" (さよなら十三, Sayonara Jūzō)

=== Anime ===
An anime television series adaptation was announced on September 1, 2025, the same day as the final chapter of the manga. It was produced by Cue and directed by Yasunori Ide, with supervision and series composition handled by Hiro Kaburagi, characters designed by Miho Daidōji, and music composed by Ryo Konishi. The series aired from April 11 to June 27, 2026, on TV Tokyo and its affiliates. The opening theme song is "ATTITUDE" performed by Aespa, while the ending theme song is "KILL SHOT" performed by Riize. Remow licensed the series for simultaneous streaming worldwide on several platforms. An English dub by Bang Zoom! Entertainment premiered on the same day.

Following the airing of the final episode of the first season, a second season was announced.

==== Episodes ====
No.	Title	Directed by (Note: Production staff information is taken from the ending credits of each episode.)	Written by	Original release date
1	"Let's Go to School"; Transliteration: "Gakkō e Ikō" (Japanese: 学校へ行こう)	Mikiya Muta & Jirou Yoshida	Hiro Kaburagi	April 11, 2026
Juzo Ogami, an 39-year-old assassin for the Z.O.O. syndicate, eliminates thugs from Mitsuoka Pharmaceuticals and discovers a wasp nest. One wasp stings him unconscious and he awakens at Z.O.O. headquarters in the lab of his ex-wife Eri Wanibuchi, who reveals the wasp was genetically engineered by Mitsuoka and its venom has somehow regressed him back to 13 years old. As he desires to continue working, his boss sends him undercover to Rikka Private Middle School to determine if it is safe to send his daughter there. As he never attended school himself, Ogami is supported through spy glasses by his trainee Kotatsu Nekota. Due to his awkwardness around children, his classmates label him a loser. Kotatsu moves into Ogami's apartment and automatically becomes his parental figure. Ogami is amazed to discover he loves school, except for the children. A pervert in a panda mask exposes himself to the students, but Ogami neutralizes him with a groin kick. The next day, two girls invite Ogami to the class group chat, implying they saw what he did and are grateful. Eri informs Ogami that Noren Mitsuoka, daughter of Mitsuoka's president, is in his class.
2	"Noren Mitsuoka"; Transliteration: "Mitsuoka Noren" (Japanese: 蜜岡ノレン)	Yoshiaki Kyougoku	Hiro Kaburagi	April 18, 2026
Ogami tries to talk to Noren, but she treats him with disgust. He learns from the two girls, Takada and Baba, that Noren hates men. Ogami stops for dinner and accidentally discovers Noren works at a ramen shop. Ogami is confused why an heiress would need to work. Noren demands he keep her secret and reveals the shop is her uncle's. She also admits as an heiress, men looked at her as a potential rich wife. Like her uncle, her dream is to open a ramen shop so her life is not spent surrounded by wealthy snobs. Ogami assures that it is alright to have dreams, even if her parents disapprove. Noren is suddenly kidnapped in front of him. The kidnapper demands Noren tell him about the drug her father is developing. Ogami arrives, covers Noren's eyes so she cannot see it is him, then incapacitates several thugs with rubber bullets. Afterward, he takes an unconscious Noren to her home. Noren wakes the next day certain from his voice that it was Ogami who rescued her. Ogami denies it but asks permission to continue visiting the shop for her uncle's excellent ramen.
3	"Wipe Your Own Butt"; Transliteration: "Jibun no Ketsu wa Jibun de Fuke" (Japanese: 自分のケツは自分で拭け)	Takashi Kumazen	Hiro Kaburagi	April 25, 2026
Ogami finds he is hopeless at algebra but receives help from classmate Ryo Shiraishi, who wants to be a doctor. A bully mocks them both but Ryo stands up for Ogami. The bully later tries to attack them, but Ogami throws him into a river. Clubs begin recruiting new members and Ogami mocks the Home Economics Club as being for girls. Ryo's sister, Chisato, points out that learning to look after yourself is a basic life skill, and can be used to care for others. Ogami attends a cookery session and gives the food he made to Eri. He is surprised their daughter Kozue enjoyed it enough to talk to him for the first time in weeks, so he joins the club, unaware Noren is also joining. Eri reveals Ogami could get his adult body back by marrying Noren, since her father just announced whoever marries Noren will inherit Mitsuoka Pharmaceuticals. Ogami refuses due to the age gap. Meanwhile, Noren is furious as even more men begin approaching her, so she appreciates Ogami's lack of interest in her. When numerous boys attempt to join the club to get close to her, Noren impulsively claims Ogami is already her boyfriend.
4	"The Pacifier Duel"; Transliteration: "Oshaburi Kettō" (Japanese: おしゃぶり決闘)	Atsuji Tanizawa	Hiro Kaburagi	May 2, 2026
Noren apologizes to Ogami for causing him trouble. Along with normal bullies, Takada and Baba warn Ogami about an elite group of students called the Unicorns. Kotatsu also warns him that criminal organizations that want the de-aging wasp might send their own teenage assassins to try marry Noren. Ogami decides to keep dating Noren anyway, since he feels sorry for her. An assassin named Shin Kohazame soon starts attending their school. Ogami is confused when Noren's father sends him a fountain pen as a gift. Shin finds himself actually attracted to Noren. He then uses a pacifier to calm himself down before he confesses to her. However, Noren is so repulsed that she punches him. Becoming even more attracted to her, Shin challenges Ogami to a duel for the fountain pen, the Mitsuokas' symbol of engagement. As Noren's fiancé, Ogami must accept all challenges. For the duel, Shin announces that if he manages to place a pacifier in Ogami's mouth within one hour, he wins. Ogami considers quitting, but realizes disappointing Noren would be like disappointing his own daughter. After an hour, Ogami narrowly wins. Refusing to quit, Shin joins the Home Economics Club.
5	"There's a Unicorn Up Ahead"; Transliteration: "Itta Saki ni wa Yunikōn" (Japanese: 行った先には幻獣組(ユニコーン))	Yoshiaki Kyougoku	Hiro Kaburagi	May 9, 2026
Noren is pleased as the arrival of the exams means everyone is too busy to confess to her. As Ogami is studying too much, Kotatsu kicks him out to have dinner at Mama's. Noren spots Ogami on the street and follows him to Mama's, a bar in the love hotel district owned by crossdresser Kyosuke, also known as Mama, one of the few Ogami trusts with his identity. Eri also visits and is surprised about how much happier Ogami looks. Noren sees him with Eri and suspects he is cheating with older women. The Home Economics Club is later tasked with making rice balls for the baseball team, though everyone warns Noren that one of the players, Tenma Tendo, is a Unicorn. Tenma challenges Ogami to futsal, not because he wants to marry Noren, but because Ogami is just a home ec nobody whose fame as Noren's fiancé is overshadowing his own fame as a future three-way athlete. Angry at Tenma's insult, Ogami accepts the duel. As Tenma also insulted Noren, Shin and Kito insist on being on Ogami's team. Tenma reveals to his teammate he wants to duel Ogami because he senses Ogami is powerful.
6	"How About a 'Thank You'?"; Transliteration: "Chanto Arigatō Iwankai" (Japanese: ちゃんとありがとう言わんかい)	Masahiko Suzuki	Hiro Kaburagi	May 16, 2026
Within seconds of starting the game, Tenma almost scores and Shin loses his pacifier, becoming useless with stage fright. Tenma's frustration increases the longer he cannot score against Ogami. He suddenly reveals he has been holding back to make the match more challenging, so he goes all in and scores. Ogami finds his childhood competitiveness reawakening, overpowering Tenma's kick and scoring a goal as well. Tenma suddenly admits defeat, revealing Ogami injured his leg, and if he continues the injury might worsen and affect his future career. Tenma is amazed Chisato bandages his ankle, so he genuinely apologizes for insulting the Home Economics Club. The next day, every other sports club tries to recruit Ogami. Tenma soon confesses his feelings to a shocked Chisato. As a result, a furious Ryo decides to kill Tenma. Tenma later warns Ogami that despite his efforts to hide, he is standing out like crazy, and whatever his secret is will be exposed eventually. An eavesdropping Noren worries about what said secret might be. As a favor, Tenma spreads a rumor he was injured before the match, which causes the other clubs to stop trying to recruit Ogami.
7	"Doki-Doki Double Date"; Transliteration: "Doki Doki Daburu Dēto" (Japanese: ドキドキダブルデート)	Yūki Tobita	Hiro Kaburagi	May 23, 2026
Chisato asks Ogami and Noren on a double date with her and Tenma. At the theatre, Ogami randomly becomes an adult again but escapes without Noren noticing. He is grateful to be normal again, but feels guilty abandoning Noren. Noren is kidnapped and Kotatsu notices Ogami struggling to make decisions and is openly panicking. Meanwhile, Chisato convinces Tenma to help Ogami rescue Noren. Ogami soon becomes young again just as Tenma arrives. However, the two teenage kidnappers, Kazuma and Eiji Rindou, are from JARDIN, a bigger organization with more dangerous assassins. Kazuma, a hypnotist, plans to hypnotize Noren to fall in love with Eiji. He also offers to hypnotize Chisato to love Tenma if Tenma leaves. As an athlete, Tenma considers this cheating, and refuses. Eiji attacks with explosive golf balls, forcing Tenma to hide. Kotatsu sends Ogami a drone filled with guns, which Kazuma shoots down. Ogami makes a noise for Eiji to shoot at, the explosion pushing a gun into Ogami's hand. Ogami admits he sees Noren like a daughter, so Kazuma seducing her through hypnotism has made him furious.
8	"Versus the Rindou Brothers"; Transliteration: "Bāsasu Rindō Kyōdai" (Japanese: VS竜胆兄弟)	Yukio Takatsu	Hiro Kaburagi	May 30, 2026
Kazuma is stunned Ogami perfectly blocked his shots by shooting his bullets in midair. As such accuracy is rare, Kazuma suspects Ogami is actually the legendary assassin of the same name. However, the latter denies this by claiming he is Ogami's illegitimate son. Kazuma soon admits Eiji used to be normal until a certain incident mentally handicapped him. He plans for Noren to marry Eiji in order to gain access to a cure for Eiji. Kazuma suddenly reveals his hypnosis tool, a lighter. Meanwhile, Tenma challenges Eiji to an athletic duel. Ogami manages to hide, but Chisato appears and suddenly produces the lighter, hypnotizing Ogami to be unable to attack Kazuma or Eiji. Ogami realizes it is Kazuma in disguise, and he is now unable to shoot Kazuma, but he can aim at other things. Feigning surrender, Ogami reveals he intentionally fired three shots into the air, which are now falling back to earth. One bullet strikes a bomb he planted, hurling Kazuma into Ogami's outstretched fist. Defeated, Kazuma reveals Noren is already hypnotized to fall in love with the first person she sees when she awakens, which causes a panicked Ogami to rush towards her location.
9	"The Impossible Aftermath of an Impossible Game"; Transliteration: "Murigē Jigo Shori Yappa Muri" (Japanese: 無理ゲー事後処理やっぱ無理)	Takashi Kumazen	Hiro Kaburagi	June 6, 2026
Eiji and Tenma are impressed by each other's abilities. Eiji admits he does not want to kill Tenma, but as his disability makes thinking difficult, all he can do is follow Eiji's instructions. Ogami arrives and thoughtlessly claims he "dealt with Kazuma", which causes an enraged Eiji to begin hitting golf balls randomly. Tenma sends Ogami to distract Eiji before he hits the latter with his Super Gyro Shot, knocking him unconscious. Ogami forgets to cover Noren's eyes, so she falls in love with him when she wakes up. Feeling creeped out, Ogami knocks her unconscious again. Ogami then decides to let Kazuma and Eiji live. Tenma demands to know what is really going on, so Kazuma attempts to hypnotize him to forget. However, Tenma is somehow immune to hypnosis. As such, Ogami reveals the truth. Surprisingly, Tenma suggests Ogami should stay in school so he can graduate and get a normal job. The police arrive so everyone escapes without Kazuma removing Noren's hypnosis, though he promises to do so the next time they meet. At school, Ogami finds his greatest threat is now Noren.
10	"Death or Kiss" (Note: Stylized in all caps.)	Yasuyuki Fuse	Hiro Kaburagi	June 13, 2026
Ogami avoids Noren by any means necessary. Meanwhile, Ryo is furious Ogami supported Tenma's double date with Chisato. Elsewhere at Z.O.O., Kotatsu reports to Eri, who is fascinated Ogami briefly returned to his adult body and asks Kotatsu to list everything Ogami ate beforehand. With Noren chasing him nonstop, Ogami decides to reject her. When she threatens to commit suicide, he is forced to save her. He starts to wonder if hypnosis is to blame, or if some of it is Noren's real personality. Kazuma calls and explains this is what Noren would really act like if she was deeply in love. Ogami demands he fix it, so Kazuma agrees to meet in Yokohama. Noren goes along, believing it is a date, and drags Ogami to the Cup Ramen Museum. Ogami is forced to eat the ramen she makes for him. Noren demands a Ferris wheel ride where she tries to initiate a kiss. A panicked Ogami uses a silenced pistol to shoot the door open, terrifying Noren due to how high up they are. Kazuma soon arrives and undoes Noren's hypnosis. Afterward, Ogami is elated Noren is acting like herself again.
11	"The First Hitman Summit"; Transliteration: "Dai-ichi-kai Koroshiya Samitto" (Japanese: 第一回殺し屋会議(サミット))	Shin Min Seop & Yu Se Hyeong	Hiro Kaburagi	June 20, 2026
With Kazuma and Eiji transferring to the school, Ogami organizes a hitman summit. Shin refuses to cooperate as he has a grudge against Kazuma. Afterward, Shin decides to resume stealing Noren from Ogami. Meanwhile, Tamada, a diminutive member of the Home Economics Club, is tired of everyone always giving her head pats. She asks Ogami to introduce her to Tenma. When Tenma declines her request to help her, Ogami takes her to Mama's. There, Kyosuke and Tamada have a heartfelt conversation about their respective appearances. Drunk customers soon terrify Tamada, so Kyosuke beats them up. Tamada feels better, but Chisato punishes Ogami for taking Tamada to an adult bar. Chisato later announces a ramen contest. Noren insists if she wins against Shin, he must leave her alone. Walking home, Ogami saves a girl from being hit by a truck. She turns out to be one of Tamada's friends, and she volunteers to judge the contest. Having gone overboard trying to outdo each other, Shin and Noren's dishes are both disqualified. The girl admits the "other her" wants to talk to Ogami. She thus puts herself to sleep and undergoes a complete physical transformation before awakening her alternate personality.
12	"Life Paths"; Transliteration: "Shinro" (Japanese: 進路)	Naoki Hishikawa	Hiro Kaburagi	June 27, 2026
The transformed girl is revealed as Mai Otohime, the Unicorn known as the Mermaid Queen, possessing superhuman oceanic skills, especially in marine sports. Mai demands a Mitsuoka duel to strip Ogami of his position as Noren's boyfriend, as both of her personalities fell in love with him after he saved her. When Ogami rejects Mai, a furious Noren steps in to duel Mai instead. As such, Mai challenges them to a surfing contest. Since neither Noren nor Ogami have ever surfed, the Home Economics Club organizes a three-day beach training trip. Meanwhile, the parent-teacher conference approaches. Kotatsu resolves the issue by arriving in drag to play Ogami's mother. The meeting succeeds, though Ogami still plans to punish Kotatsu later. Noren also brings her apparently normal mother to school, leaving Ogami to reflect on his own uncertain future if he ever reverts back to adulthood. He finds comfort when Chisato admits she lacks a plan too, wanting to experience high school first. Ogami realizes that if he remains a child and must grow up all over again, it gives him a rare chance at a future where he is not forced to be an assassin.

== Reception ==
The series was ranked seventh in the Nationwide Bookstore Employees' Recommended Comics of 2024 list. The series ranked tenth in the print category at the tenth Next Manga Awards in 2024.

Kaylie Fielden of Screen Rant felt the plot was unique among other hitman manga and praised the beginning chapters. Robbie Pleasant of Multiversity Comics praised the artwork and characters. Regarding the story, Pleasant felt that it had some worrying elements concerning a possible romance between Ogami and Noren but nonetheless handled them well. Kara Dennison of Otaku USA described the series as "Case Closed with added violence".
