= Fate/Grand Order: Final Singularity-Grand Temple of Time: Solomon =

- Directed by: Toshifumi Akai
- Written by: Kinoko Nasu
- Based on: Fate/Grand Order by: Kinoko Nasu; Type-Moon
- Produced by: Shizuka Kurosaki
- Starring: Nobunaga Shimazaki; Rie Takahashi; Kenichi Suzumura; Maaya Sakamoto; Ayako Kawasumi; Tomokazu Sugita
- Music by: Keita Haga; Ryo Kawasaki
- Production company: CloverWorks
- Distributed by: Aniplex of America
- Release date: July 30, 2021
- Running time: 94 minutes
- Country: Japan
- Language: Japanese

Fate/Grand Order: Final Singularity-Grand Temple of Time: Solomon (Japanese: フェイト/グランドオーダー -終局特異点 冠位時間神殿ソロモン-, Hepburn: Feito/Gurando Ōdā Shuukyoku Tokuiten - Kani Jikan Shinden Solomon) is a 2021 Japanese animated fantasy film based on the video game Fate/Grand Order. Part of Type-Moon's Fate franchise, it was produced by CloverWorks and was released on July 30, 2021.

== Plot ==
As Ritsuka and Mash Rayshift to the final Singularity, they both see a vision of someone speaking of how they cannot bear the endless suffering of humanity, which they are subjected to due to their clairvoyance exposing them to all the horrors of the past and future. They decide that the only way to rectify the repulsive state of the world is to destroy humanity, and that to achieve this, everything must be redone and perfected from the beginning, from true nothingness. Their plan is to recreate the planet from its very origin, which requires the massive amount energy generated by incinerating all life across 3000 years.

Waking up from the vision, Ritsuka and Mash find they have arrived at Time Temple. Leonardo da Vinci reports a Beast is detected throughout the entire space. Lev Lainur Flauros appears before them, commending their efforts but still determined to stop them. Flauros then transforms into his Demon God and along with the other seventy one Demon Gods, attacks Chaldea. When it appears Chaldea will be destroyed, Jeanne D' Arc suddenly arrives, using Ritsuka as a beacon to summon an entire army of Heroic Spirits to aid him. The Heroic Spirits successfully open a path for Ritsuka and Mash, and as they head towards the Throne, Romani reasons that Solomon cannot be a fake, as the Time Temple was created from Solomon's Magic Circuits, and instead deduces something inside Solomon's body is controlling his corpse. After resurrecting his corpse, "Solomon" implanted the Demon Gods in preparation for the Incineration of Humanity. Afterwards, he created the Time Temple, which exists outside time and space, and waited there until the year 2016.

Ritsuka and Mash confront "Solomon" at the Throne, and he reveals he is actually the Demon God Goetia, formerly the original Solomon's familiar before possessing his corpse and evolving into Beast I. Angry that humans are afflicted by the inevitability of death, Goetia plans to use the incineration of humanity to create a new world where death doesn't exist. He asks Mash to join him due to her shortened lifespan, but she refuses, so he decides to destroy them with this third Noble Phantasm, Ars Almadel Salomis. Mash attempts to block the attack with Lord Camelot but ends up being incinerated, leaving behind only her shield. Romani then arrives, revealing himself to be the real Solomon, having been summoned by Marisbury Animusphere to fight in the Fifth Holy Grail War before wishing himself to become human. He also reveals he kept his tenth ring which grants him the power to cast Ars Nova, which will return all his gifts to God. This causes all of his achievements to disappear, greatly weakening Goetia.

With Solomon's sacrifice, the Time Temple begins to collapse, and the Demon Gods are thrown into disarray: they either self-destruct, are destroyed by the Heroic Spirits, change side, or flee. Goetia's body begins to crumble away due to Ars Nova destroying the Demon Gods' union. Even when only three Demon Gods remain, he refuses to admit defeat and continues trying to kill Ritsuka. Ritsuka retaliates by protecting himself with Mash's shield and seemingly destroys Goetia with a punch empowered by a Command Spell. As the Temple of Time begins to collapse, he attempts to reach the Rayshift point but is stopped by the remnants of Goetia. Now understanding human mentality with his newly gained mortality, Goetia tries to kill Ritsuka to protect his pride. After Ritsuka defeats him, Goetia disappears content. Ritsuka continues on his way, but the path beneath him collapses before they reach the Rayshift point. However, a revived Mash arrives and saves Ritsuka, and the two return to Chaldea to celebrate their victory.

During the credits, it is revealed that Fou revived Mash, which allowed her to rescue Ritsuka.

== Voice cast ==
Character	Japanese
Ritsuka Fujimaru	Nobunaga Shimazaki
Mash Kyrielight	Rie Takahashi
Fou	Ayako Kawasumi
Romani Archaman	Kenichi Suzumura
Leonardo Da Vinci	Maaya Sakamoto
Goetia	Tomokazu Sugita
Jeanne D'Arc	Maaya Sakamoto
Nero Claudeus	Sakura Tange
Mordred	Miyuki Sawashiro
Enkidu	Yū Kobayashi

== Production and release ==
The film was revealed as the eighth and final chapter of Fate/Grand Order: Observer on Timeless Temple, covering the events of the Solomon Singularity. CloverWorks, who produced the Fate/Grand Order - Absolute Demonic Front: Babylonia television series, returned to animate the film, so as the main staff from series, with Kinoko Nasu credited for the original script. The film premiered in Japan on July 30, 2021. Crunchyroll streamed the film on February 18, 2022.
