= Fate/Grand Order =

2015 Japanese mobile video game

- Developers: Delightworks (2015–2021); Lasengle (2021–present); Sega AM2 (Arcade)
- Publishers: Android, iOS: JP: Aniplex; NA: Aniplex of America; Arcade: JP: Sega
- Directors: Yosuke Shiokawa (Part 1–1.5); Yoshiki Kanou (Part 2–)
- Producers: Atsuhiro Iwakami; Akihito Shouji (2015–2016); Yosuke Shiokawa
- Artists: Takashi Takeuchi; Mika Pikazo; Et al.
- Writers: Kinoko Nasu; Yuichiro Higashide; Hikaru Sakurai; Et al.
- Composers: Keita Haga; James Harris
- Series: Fate
- Engine: Unity
- Platforms: Android, iOS, iPadOS
- Release: Android: JP: 30 July 2015; NA: 25 June 2017; iOS: JP: 12 August 2015; NA: 25 June 2017
- Genre: Role-playing
- Mode: Single-player
- Arcade system: Sega ALLS UX (FGO Arcade)

Fate/Grand Order (Japanese: フェイト・グランドオーダー, Hepburn: Feito/Gurando Ōdā) is a free-to-play Japanese gacha mobile game, developed by Lasengle (formerly Delightworks) using Unity, and published by Aniplex, a subsidiary of Sony Music Entertainment Japan. The game is based on Type-Moon's Fate/stay night franchise, and was released in Japan on 29 July 2015 for Android, and on 12 August 2015, for iOS. English-language versions followed on 25 June 2017 in the United States and Canada, and a Korean version was released on 21 November 2017. An arcade version titled Fate/Grand Order Arcade was released by Sega in Japan on 26 July 2018.

The game is centered around turn-based combat where the player, who takes on the role of a "Master", summons and commands powerful familiars known as "Servants" to battle enemies. The story narrative is presented in a visual novel format, and each Servant has their own scenario which the player can explore. Servants are obtained through the gacha mechanic. As of July 2021, the game grossed $5.4 billion worldwide, making it the seventh highest-grossing mobile game of all time. Total revenues reached $7 billion by September 2023.

== Gameplay ==
A combat sequence in Fate: Grand Order: Here, Kid Gil (Archer), Ryougi Shiki (Assassin) and Gilgamesh (Archer) face off against Hand of Dawn enemies

Fate/Grand Order is a turn-based role-playing game with some visual novel elements. The player takes the role of a "Master" and commands a group of individuals called "Servants", who are typically historical, literary, and mythological figures from various cultures. The player commands a party composed of up to 6 Servants in each battle, 3 active members, and 3 reserve members. In each turn, the player is given a set of 5 Command Cards and may use up to 3 of them in a turn to attack. Each Servant has 5 cards the player may use; the cards for all the Servants on the field are shuffled and dealt to the player each turn. The cards have three types: Buster (a heavy attack), Arts (a medium attack that charges a gauge for the Servant's "Noble Phantasm"), and Quick (a light attack that generates Critical Stars that increase the probability of critical hits next turn). If three similar cards are used in one turn, they create a "Chain" which gives a bonus based on the cards' properties. If three cards all corresponding to the same servant are selected, then a "Brave Chain" will ensue, resulting in an extra, more powerful, attack being added to the end. Each Servant also has skills that can be used before drawing Command Cards; each skill gives effects in the battle, as well as a special command card called "Noble Phantasm" that appears when the gauge is full. The "Master" also has a separate set of skills and special abilities called "Command Spells." Command Spells have a variety of effects and recharge based on real-world time.

Servants are obtained via a gacha mechanic. Saint Quartz, an in-game currency earned both by playing the game and via real money in-app purchases, is used to summon new Servants and acquire "Craft Essences" which give additional effects when equipped to a servant. This summoning is random, with some servants available commonly, and others rarely. Another currency is "Friend Points", which are more easily acquired, but only can acquire common Servants with them. If multiple copies of the same Servant are acquired, that servant's "Noble Phantasm" can be increased.

The differences between mobile and Arcade versions are commonly the characters' appearances: The mobile version uses 2D sprites, while the Arcade version uses 3D models.

== Plot ==
The game is divided into three canon chapters, all unlocked after clearing the previous scenario.

=== Chapter 1: Observer at the Timeless Temple ===
In 2015, the Chaldea Security Organization draws on experts of both the magical and mundane fields to observe the future of mankind for possible extinction events. Humanity's survival seems assured for the next century—until the verdict suddenly changes, and now eradication of the species awaits at the end of 2016. The cause is unknown, but appears to be linked with the Japanese town of Fuyuki and the events of 2004 during the Fifth Holy Grail War. In response, Chaldea harnesses an experimental means of time travel, the Rayshift technology. With it, Ritsuka Fujimaru (a young man or woman, depending on the player's choice of gender) who was newly recruited to the organization, and a mysterious girl named Mash Kyrielight, can travel back to 2004 and discover how to save humanity. A grand order to fight fate has been declared—an order to change the past and restore the future. Following the events in Fuyuki, Ritsuka Fujimaru and Mash Kyrielight must restore the Foundation of Humanity by retrieving powerful Holy Grails. The Grails, which are capable of granting any wish, are also able to sustain abnormalities called Singularities that threaten humanity's existence. The protagonists utilize Rayshift technology to travel back in time to said periods, ranging from Orleans to Okeanos and even the ancient civilization of Babylonia. Along the way, Ritsuka encounters the main antagonist and mastermind behind the plan to eradicate humanity: the Mage-King Solomon. He proclaims that Chaldea's attempt to save humanity will not matter if they fail to obtain every single Holy Grail, before leaving. After obtaining all 7 Holy Grails, Fujimaru and their Servant advance into Ars Paulina, the throne where Solomon once sat.

In the final battle against Solomon and his legion of 72 Demon Gods, both Ritsuka and Mash are unable to defeat any of the Demon Pillars as they regenerate immediately. When all hope seems lost, the Servants that assisted Ritsuka on their quest through every Singularity appear, allowing Chaldea to break through and defeat Solomon, who is revealed to be the Demon God Goetia, a Beast that possessed Solomon's corpse and wishes to eradicate humanity in order to travel back to the dawn of humankind. Goetia used his Noble Phantasm to cancel the Servants' summoning, leaving only Ritsuka and Mash to fight. However, Mash utilizes her Noble Phantasm to deflect Goetia's Noble Phantasm to protect Ritsuka in exchange for her life. Just as hope was lost, Romani appeared and revealed that he himself is actually the real Solomon, the Grand Caster who wished to be human after the fifth Holy Grail War. Romani uses his Noble Phantasm to weaken Goetia and allow Ritsuka to summon the Servants again at the cost of his existence, entrusting everything to Ritsuka. With Goetia's defeat, the final Singularity is restored to order, and Mash is revived via the power of Beast IV, who is revealed to be Fou, a dog-like creature that has journeyed alongside Fujimaru and their party through the entirety of the game. Upon completion of the Singularities, Ritsuka Fujimaru is awarded the rank of Cause, by the Mages Association.

=== Chapter 1.5: Epic of Remnant ===
In the aftermath of the Singularity crisis, Chaldea is under heavy suspicion from various organizations including the U.N. and the Mages Association due to their role in Rayshifting in various eras. Upon the suspicion, the group detected a new Singularity separate from the ones came before it. Dubbed as Sub-Singularities, Ritsuka is again tasked with handling Singularity Subspecies and solving even deeper mysteries over their existence.

=== Chapter 2: Cosmos in the Lostbelt ===
Following the completion of the Sub-Singularities, Chaldea finds itself under new management under Goredolf Musik. It turns out that Goredolf was just a scapegoat in a hostile takeover by a mysterious organization, conspiring with an unknown entity known as the Alien God to destroy Chaldea and the current human history, reverting the planet back to the Age of Gods. Now on the run, Ritsuka, Mash and the surviving members of Chaldea survived aboard the autonomous vessel Shadow Border. In order to save humanity, the group now travels to different timelines called "Lostbelts"; alternate versions of history that differ drastically from the main human history and were "pruned away" from the primary timeline after having been deemed a dead end. The seven Lostbelts are each represented by a Crypter, former human Masters and their Servants, each of whom are in competition against one another as well as the Chaldean survivors for the ultimate fate of human history. Now calling themselves Novum Chaldea, the new organization faces several harsh battles between them and both the Crypters and its Lostbelt Kings, resolving and pruning each Lostbelts while they witness the descending of the Alien God itself: U-Olga Marie, who bears strong resemblance to the deceased Chaldea Director, Olga Marie. During their battles through the Lostbelts, they also encounter a man identical to Romani who introduced himself the Chaldean.

After pruning the Seventh Lostbelt, Novum Chaldea learned that U-Olga Marie is not the true Alien God itself and was actually a Disciple to the true mastermind. Novum Chaldea attempt to return to Chaldea's headquarters, where the mastermind resides, only to be blocked by a barrier. They are informed that due to using Extra Class Servants, they have been rejected by the Human Order. The organization must endure an Ordeal Call to prove that their Extra Classes are connected to humanity. After resolving the Ordeal Call, Novum Chaldea finally delved inside Antarctica with the help from the Chaldean, whose true identity is Goetia using Romani's form as an atonement for his previous deeds. Acknowledging Novum Chaldea, he once again takes the identity of Grand Caster King Solomon and forms a temporary contract with Ritsuka to assist them for the final battle.

They finally reached the true endpoint as they learned that all this time, the true culprit is none other than the Chaldeas itself as it manifested into the Seventh Beast of Humanity and the entirety of their world is a Lostbelt, created the moment Marisbury won the Fifth Holy Grail War in Fuyuki. Destroying Chaldeas would mean erasing the whole event, resulting in everyone forgetting the whole thing once they return to the Proper Human History. Accepting the consequence, Novum Chaldea, assisted by all the friends they made throughout the Lostbelts, proceed to destroy Chaldeas, restoring the Proper Human History. In the new timeline, Mash lives a normal life as a college student, not remembering her adventure with Chaldea, but is reunited with Ritsuka at Tokyo Station during her trip to Japan.

=== After-Time ===
In the last second before new year 2020, Ritsuka and Mash inexplicably find themselves back at Chaldea with vague memories of the new timeline created after they pruned Lostbelt Zero, but they retain memories when they went on adventures with Chaldea. Additionally, the rest of Chaldea crew and Olga Marie are present (except for post-Novum Chaldea members such as Goredolf, Sion, Captain Nemo, and Chaldeas), the latter returns to her position as Chaldea director. Grand Assassin Azrael reveals that the world they're in is a world stuck between Lostbelt Zero and the new timeline, caused by a Beast. Azrael gives Chaldea one year to solve the whole situation with a threat that should they fail, he'll deem them responsible and kill them.

The Norns, the Norse Sisters of Fate who are squabbling over whether the past, present, or future is most important have manifested as Demi-Beasts and took advantage of Chaldea being trapped in time to use as pawns to settle their argument. They are taking turns attacking Chaldea, and the one who defeats it will win the argument and become the true Beast. Chaldea defeats Urd, the Norn of the Past, who agrees to help find and defeat the other two.

When Olga Marie is temporarily incapacitated by being turned into a child, Azrael brings a version of Goredolf from the future to help. When the problem is solved, Azrael returns Goredolf home, but Goredolf secretly reveals that the future world is in ruins.

== Development and release ==
The game was first drafted by Kinoko Nasu under the working title "Fate Online Project Reboot", which was meant to be a massively multiplayer online game using designs, drafts and concepts later collected in the Fate/complete material IV Extra material book. But the planned game was cancelled and shelved during planning stages. It later became a novel, Fate/Apocrypha, which integrated some concepts of the planned game. Later on in 2014, Aniplex proposed Nasu to revisit the cancelled game project, announcing a collaboration with the game studio Delightworks to rework the concept into a mobile RPG game.

The game was published by Aniplex and was released in Japan on 29 July 2015, on Android devices, with a subsequent release on 12 August for iOS devices. Maaya Sakamoto performed four theme songs for the game: "Shikisai" (色彩; "Color"), "Gyakko" (逆光, Gyakkō; "Backlight"), "Yakudo" (躍動; "Impetus") and "Tokei" (時計; "Timepiece"). Aside from its gameplay and own storyline, the game also features events for players to obtain new items and servants, such as summoning campaigns for limited Servants/Craft Essences, specific Servant-based events, real-world annual events, and collaborations with other Type-Moon works such as The Garden of Sinners and Fate/Zero.

On 1 January 2017, a sub-sequel to the main storyline was announced with the same title containing a subtitle named "Epic of Remnant". On 16 April 2017, Aniplex of America announced Fate/Grand Order would be released in the United States with a Summer 2017 release window. Director and Creative Producer Yosuke Shiokawa explained that while the game was intended to be released only in Japan, the team took notice of the large number of overseas players accessing the game and made a decision to make it accessible to other regions as well. Since the game's release to North American servers, it has followed behind Japanese servers by almost exactly 2 years, the same gap between launches in the two regions.

On 26 December 2017, the official website and the Twitter page of the game teased the game's sequel by changing it into a "hijacked account and site". The sequel's subtitle, "Cosmos in the Lostbelt", was announced on 1 January 2018. The sequel was officially released as an expansion to the main game on the Japanese server starting in Spring 2018. On 20 April 2018, it was announced that the North American server was made officially accessible in Australia, Philippines, Singapore, Thailand, and Vietnam.

On 15 December 2021, Delightworks announced that it would spin off its entire game division, including the Grand Order development team, to a new company. It was established under the name Lasengle on 28 December 2021. As part of the deal, its shares were then acquired by Aniplex on 1 February 2022.

On 24 February 2022, Aniplex ended services in Vietnam due to Vietnamese regulations rules. On 2 August 2022, the North American server was made officially accessible to United Kingdom, Germany, France, Italy, Spain, The Netherlands, Finland, Sweden, Poland, Switzerland, Austria, Ireland, Belgium, Norway, Denmark, Portugal, Mexico, Brazil, Chile, and New Zealand.

== Reception ==
=== Popularity ===
As of October 2018, the game is available in five languages across ten countries, having received a total of 32 million downloads worldwide, including over 4 million downloads for the English version, and 7 million in September 2019, surpassing Fortnite and PlayerUnknown's Battlegrounds.

The game is very popular in Japan, its first market, and reports indicate that the level is comparable to the success of Pokémon Go. In Japan, the game had crossed 13 million downloads by May 2018, and 14 million downloads as of August 2018. FGO is also gaining traction in other parts of the world such as in the U.S. and Canada where it already surpassed 1 million downloads after its June 2017 Android release there.

In China, the iOS version went online on 29 September 2016 and Android on 13 October 2016.

In 2019, the game was regarded the most popular game on Twitter.

=== Revenue ===
Fate/Grand Order grossed over $646 million during 2015 to 2016. In 2017, the game grossed ¥89.6 billion ($566 million) in Japan between January and 3 October, and ¥13.2 billion ($83 million) in China. Worldwide, the game grossed $982 million in 2017, making it the year's sixth highest-grossing mobile game. In 2018, it grossed at least ¥134.8 billion ($851 million), including ¥120.4 billion in Japan (where it was the year's second highest-grossing mobile game) along with ¥14.4 billion overseas during the first half of the year. It was the year's top mobile game in terms of worldwide consumer spending. In China, its income accounted for the majority of its Chinese operator Bilibili's annual income in 2017.

In 2018, Fate/Grand Order drew widespread media attention due to reports of a 31-year old Japanese man identified only as Daigo, claiming to have spent $70,000 to purchase the game's currency, called Saint Quartz, which is used to summon Servants. Daigo kept on spending cash in-game in his desire to get high-level characters and ended up spending more to strengthen them once they were acquired. In an interview, the gamer said, "Some people spend $18 on a movie and feel moved. I've spent $70,000 on FGO. But it moves me." This incident highlighted the popularity of FGO. According to The Wall Street Journal, the game was partly responsible for Sony's soaring operating profit. As of March 2018, the app contributed an average of $2.5 million every day.

Fate/Grand Order grossed $982 million in 2017, making it the year's sixth highest-grossing mobile game. In 2018, Fate/Grand Order grossed $1.2 billion, making it the year's seventh highest-grossing free-to-play game. In 2019, the game grossed $1.2 billion. By 13 March 2019, the game had grossed more than $3 billion worldwide. Total revenue crossed $4 billion by the end of 2019. It was the world's top-grossing mobile game during the 2020 New Year period, ahead of fellow JRPG title Monster Strike. As of July 2021, the game grossed $5.4 billion worldwide, making it the seventh highest-grossing mobile game of all time. As of September 2023, total revenues reached $7 billion.

=== Criticisms and controversy ===
The game illustrations have been described by some as overly sexualized. In late 2010s some illustrations from the game have been subject to censorship in China to remove cleavage. In September 2021, Chinese service provider bilibili removed all art and most data for many Chinese-themed characters within the game that were deemed historically incorrect.

Fate/Grand Order has been criticized for having a stingy drop rate on its rare servants, with it being extremely expensive to reliably acquire them.

== Other media ==
- Fate/Grand Order
- Fate/Grand Order: First Order key visual, featuring Ritsuka Fujimaru (left) and Mash Kyrielight (right)
- Created by: Type-Moon
- Manga

Learn with Manga! Fate Grand/Order
- Written by: Riyo
- Published by: Kadokawa Shoten
- English publisher: NA: Aniplex of America
- Original run: 13 August 2015 – 19 November 2015
- Volumes: 3
- Anime television film

First Order
- Directed by: Hitoshi Nanba
- Produced by: Shizuka Kurosaki
- Written by: Ayumi Sekine
- Music by: Ryo Kawasaki
- Studio: Lay-duce
- Licensed by: AUS: Madman Entertainment; NA: Aniplex of America; UK: MVM Entertainment
- Original network: Tokyo MX, GTV, GYT, BS11
- English network: SEA: Aniplus Asia
- Released: 31 December 2016
- Runtime: 74 minutes
- Anime television film

Seven Most Powerful Great Figures Chapter
- Directed by: Takahiro Miura
- Produced by: Toshiyuki Kanezawa
- Written by: Eiichirō Mashin
- Music by: Go Shiina
- Studio: Ufotable
- Original network: Tokyo MX, GTV, GYT, BS11
- Released: 31 December 2017
- Runtime: 14 minutes
- Manga

-mortalis:stella-
- Written by: Shiramine
- Published by: Ichijinsha
- English publisher: NA: Kodansha USA
- Magazine: Monthly Comic Zero Sum
- Original run: July 2017 – present
- Volumes: 3
- Manga

-turas réalta-
- Written by: Takashi Kawabuchi
- Published by: Kodansha
- Magazine: Bessatsu Shōnen Magazine
- Original run: 9 August 2017 – present
- Volumes: 13
- Anime television film

Moonlight/Lostroom
- Directed by: Hitoshi Nanba; Takurō Tsukada
- Written by: Kinoko Nasu
- Music by: Ryo Kawasaki
- Studio: Lay-duce
- Licensed by: NA: Aniplex of America
- Original network: Tokyo MX, GTV, GYT, BS11
- English network: SEA: Aniplus Asia
- Released: 31 December 2017
- Runtime: 33 minutes
- Anime television film

Learn with Manga! Fate Grand/Order
- Directed by: Shun Enokido; Takahito Sakazume
- Produced by: Souta Furuhashi
- Written by: Riyo
- Music by: Kegani; Hideyuki Fukasawa
- Studio: A-1 Pictures
- Licensed by: NA: Aniplex of America
- Original network: Tokyo MX, GTV, GYT, BS11
- English network: SEA: Aniplus Asia
- Released: 31 December 2018
- Runtime: 15 minutes
- Anime television series
- Fate/Grand Order – Absolute Demonic Front: Babylonia (2019–2020)
- Manga

You've Lost Ritsuka Fujimaru
- Written by: Tsuchida
- Published by: Kadokawa Shoten
- Magazine: Type-Moon Comic Ace
- Original run: June 2020 – present
- Volumes: 2
- Anime film series

Divine Realm of the Round Table: Camelot
- Directed by: Kei Suezawa (part 1); Kazuto Arai (part 2)
- Produced by: Shizuka Kurosaki; Genki Itou
- Written by: Ukyō Kodachi (parts 1–2); Kazuto Arai (part 2)
- Music by: Keita Haga; Hideyuki Fukasawa
- Studio: Signal.MD (part 1); Production I.G (part 2)
- Licensed by: AUS: Madman Entertainment; NA: Aniplex of America
- Released: 5 December 2020 (part 1); 15 May 2021 (part 2)
- Films: 2
- Original video animation

Fate/Grand Carnival
- Directed by: Seiji Kishi
- Produced by: Yūji Higa
- Written by: Makoto Uezu
- Music by: Keita Haga; Yasuharu Takanashi
- Studio: Lerche
- Licensed by: NA: Aniplex of America
- Released: 2 June 2021 – 13 October 2021
- Episodes: 2
- Anime film
- Fate/Grand Order: Final Singularity-Grand Temple of Time: Solomon (2021)
- Original net animation

You've Lost Ritsuka Fujimaru
- Directed by: Tsuchida
- Produced by: Yuki Kataoka; Makoto Takashina
- Written by: Tsuchida
- Music by: Kegani; Iruma Rioka; Pan
- Studio: DLE
- Licensed by: NA: Aniplex of America
- Released: 4 February 2023 – present
- Episodes: 83

=== Anime ===
An animated television film special titled Fate/Grand Order: First Order (Japanese: フェイト/グランドオーダー -First Order-, Hepburn: Feito/Gurando Ōdā -First Order-) aired on 31 December 2016. It was an adaptation of the game's prologue. The film, produced by the studio Lay-duce, was directed by Hitoshi Nanba, and stars the voice actors Nobunaga Shimazaki, Rie Takahashi, and Ayako Kawasumi, in the roles of the main characters who were projected into the past to try to prevent the approaching extinction of humanity. Aniplex of America has licensed the special in North America. MVM Films released the film in the UK. It was followed by an animation short titled Fate/Grand Order: Moonlight/Lostroom (Japanese: フェイト/グランドオーダー -Moonlight/Lostroom-, Hepburn: Feito/Gurando Ōdā -Moonlight/Lostroom-) on 31 December 2017. It was directed by Hitoshi Nanba and Takurō Tsukada, with scripts by Kinoko Nasu, and music by Ryo Kawasaki. Aniplex of America licensed the second special in North American territories.

A special animation short produced by Ufotable titled Fate/Grand Order x Himuro's World: Seven Most Powerful Great Figures Chapter (Japanese: フェイト/グランドオーダー × 氷室の天地 ～7人の最強偉人篇～, Hepburn: Feito/Gurando Ōdā x Himuro no Tenchi: 7-nin no Saikyō Ijin-hen) was announced at the "Fate/Grand Order Guest Talk Stage in Akihabara Festival 2017" and aired on 31 December 2017. The animation is based on a 4-panel comedy manga Fate/School Life by Eiichirō Mashin who also provided the scripts, directed by Takahiro Miura, produced by Toshiyuki Kanezawa, with character design by Masato Nagamori, and music by Go Shiina.

An anime adaptation of the seventh chapter of the game was animated by CloverWorks and aired from October 2019 to March 2020. During the Fate Project New Year's Eve TV Special 2020, it was announced that there would be a new two-part OVA series titled Fate/Grand Carnival (Japanese: フェイト/グランドカーニル, Hepburn: Feito/Gurando Kānibaru), produced by Lerche, with a section of the first part shown during the TV special. The main staff from Carnival Phantasm returned to produce the series. The first part of the OVA premiered on 2 June 2021, while the second part of the OVA, after being delayed twice, premiered on 13 October 2021. Aniplex of America licensed the OVA series, opening an English version of the site in August 2021. A Blu-Ray release will be done on October 11 with English dub and Japanese voice tracks.

An anime adaptation of the Fate/Grand Order: You've Lost Ritsuka Fujimaru comedy manga was announced during the annual Fate Project New Year's Eve TV Special on 31 December 2022. The series is directed by Tsuchida and animated by DLE. It premiered on 4 February 2023.

=== Films ===
A two-part anime film adaptation, titled Fate/Grand Order - Divine Realm of the Round Table: Camelot (Japanese: フェイト/グランドオーダー -神聖円卓領域 キャメロット-, Hepburn: Feito/Gurando Ōdā Shinsei Entaku Ryōiki Kyamerotto) was produced by Production I.G and Signal.MD, adapting the 6th chapter of the game. Ukyō Kodachi wrote the first films' scripts, and Keita Haga and Hideyuki Fukasawa composed the films' scores. Kei Suezawa directed the first film at Signal.MD while Kazuto Arai directed the second film at Production I.G. Both films feature animation character designs by Mieko Hosoi, Kazuchika Kise and Nakaya Onsen, who adapted Takashi Takeuchi's original designs. The first of two films, subtitled Wandering; Airgetlám, was slated to premiere on 15 August 2020, but was delayed to 5 December 2020 due to the COVID-19 pandemic. Maaya Sakamoto performed the song "Dokuhaku" (独白; "Monologue") as the first film's theme. After the premiere of the first film, it was announced that the second film, subtitled Paladin: Agateram, was set to premiere on 8 May 2021, but was delayed to 15 May 2021 due to emergency COVID-19 procedures. A theatrical film adaptation of the final chapter of the first part of the game by CloverWorks, Fate/Grand Order: Final Singularity-Grand Temple of Time: Solomon, was released in theaters on 30 July 2021. The main staff from the Babylonia anime adaptation returned to helm the film, with Kinoko Nasu credited for the original script.

=== Manga ===
Three manga adaptations were released. The first manga series, -mortalis:stella- was written by Shiramine, serialized in Ichijinsha's Monthly Comic Zero Sum magazine. Two tankobon volumes have been released so far. Kodansha USA licensed the manga in English. The second manga series, -turas réalta- is written by Takashi Kawabuchi and serialized through Kodansha's Bessatsu Shōnen Magazine since 9 August 2017. Kodansha published the first tankōbon volume on 9 January 2018. As of 9 December 2020, nine volumes have been released.

A 4-panel comedy manga titled Learning with Manga! Fate/Grand Order (マンガで分かる! Fate/Grand Order, Manga de Wakaru! Feito/Gurando Ōdā) was written and illustrated by Riyo and released online on 13 April 2015. The manga covers the basics of the game in a more comedic tone than the main series. It was followed by two sequels: More Learning with Manga! Fate Grand/Order (もっとマンガで分かる！ Fate/Grand Order, Motto Manga de Wakaru! Feito/Gurando Ōdā) on 17 December 2015 and Even More Learning with Manga! Fate Grand/Order (ますますマンガで分かる！ Fate/Grand Order, Masumasu Manga de Wakaru! Feito/Gurando Ōdā) on 3 August 2017. Kadokawa Shoten released a compilation of the chapters of the first two series on one tankobon volume on 2 August 2017. Aniplex of America officially translated all of the first manga's chapters into English.

Another comedy manga titled Fate/Grand Order: You've Lost Ritsuka Fujimaru (Fate/Grand Order 藤丸立香はわからない, Feito/Gurando Ōdā: Fujimaru Ritsuka wa Wakaranai; "Fate/Grand Order: Fujimaru Ritsuka Doesn't Get It") was written and illustrated by Tsuchida and serialized in Type-Moon Comic Ace since June 2020. Two tankobon volumes were released by Kadokawa Shoten so far.

=== Video game adaptations ===
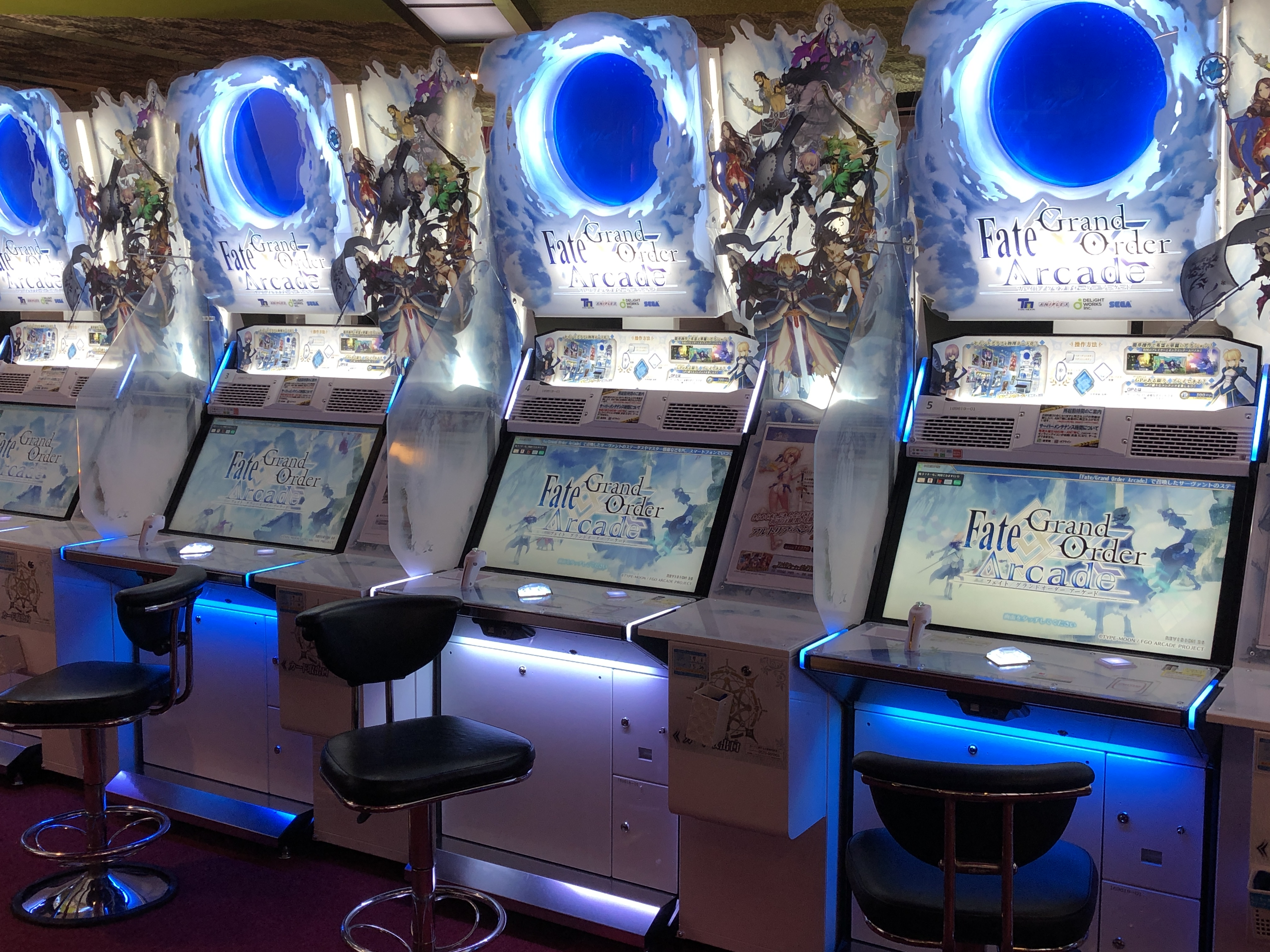
Fate/Grand Order Arcade cabinets

An arcade version of the game titled Fate/Grand Order Arcade (Japanese: フェイト/グランドオーダー アーケード, Hepburn: Feito/Gurando Ōdā ākēdo) was released by Sega, on 26 July 2018. Within the first month of the arcade version's release on 26 July 2018, Sega sold 10 million cards for the arcade game, grossing ¥1 billion ($6 million) in card sales revenue by August 2018. As of September 2018, the arcade version has more than 300,000 players in Japan. Combined, the mobile and arcade versions of the game have grossed a total revenue of approximately $3.4 billion between August 2015 and December 2018. On January 29, 2026, it was announced that service for the game will end by March 2026.

A virtual reality game titled Fate/Grand Order VR feat. Mash Kyrielight was released for PlayStation VR, and allowed the player to interact with Mash. A mobile rhythm game, titled Fate/Grand Order: Waltz in the Moonlight/Lostroom was released by Aniplex on 13 August 2020 as a limited download game for the franchise's 5th anniversary and was available for Japanese players only. The game gained controversy when third-party app store Qooapp was forced to remove the game alongside other versions of Fate/Grand Order by Aniplex's request, due to the illegal download count of the limited app. After the removal, Aniplex made the game available once again for a 24-hour period on 25 August 2020.

=== Stage plays ===
A stage play titled Fate/Grand Order The Stage: Domain of the Holy Round Table Camelot Replica; Agateram was also released. It is based on the Camelot singularity, and played from 14 to 17 July 2017 at the Zepp Blue Theater in Roppongi, Tokyo. A second stage play, Fate/Grand Order The Stage: Order VII: The Absolute Frontline in the War Against the Demonic Beasts: Babylonia, based on the Babylonia singularity, played from 11 to 14 January 2019 at Sankei Hall Breeze in Osaka, then from 19 to 27 January 2019 at Nippon Seinenkan Hall in Tokyo.
