= Robot × LaserBeam =

Japanese manga series

- First tankōbon volume cover, featuring Robato Hatohara
- Genre: Sports
- Manga
- Written by: Tadatoshi Fujimaki
- Published by: Shueisha
- English publisher: NA: Viz Media
- Imprint: Jump Comics
- Magazine: Weekly Shōnen Jump
- English magazine: NA: Weekly Shonen Jump
- Original run: March 18, 2017 – June 25, 2018
- Volumes: 7
- icon

Robot × LaserBeam (stylized as ROBOT×LASERBEAM) is a Japanese sports manga series written and illustrated by Tadatoshi Fujimaki. It tells the story of an eccentric high school student nicknamed "Robot" who encounters golf for the first time. It was serialized in Shueisha's Weekly Shōnen Jump from March 2017 to June 2018, with its chapters collected in seven tankōbon volumes. In North America, it has been licensed by Viz Media, which published it on their digital Weekly Shonen Jump magazine and published the seven volumes digitally in September 2020.

== Characters ==
Robota Hatohara (鳩原 呂羽人, Hatohara Robato)
A talented golfer with no interest in the game until "winning" a game against Youzan. His shots are considered by friends and opponents to be like Lasers. He is brutally honest and often has a blank expression on his face. His orange hair comes from his mom, who is Scottish.
Youzan Miura (三浦 鷹山, Miura Yōzan)
Robota's Rival. A former Kendo player. He loves golf, and is always looking for a challenge. When he swings his clubs, they are considered to be similar to Iai slashes.

== Publication ==
Robot × LaserBeam is written and illustrated by Tadatoshi Fujimaki. The series ran in Shueisha's Weekly Shōnen Jump from March 18, 2017, to June 25, 2018. Shueisha collected its chapters into seven tankōbon volumes, released from July 4, 2017, to September 4, 2018.

In North America, Viz Media published the series on their digital Weekly Shonen Jump magazine. Viz Media announced the English digital release of the manga in November 2019. The seven volumes were published on September 22, 2020.

=== Volumes ===
No.	Original release date	Original ISBN	English release date	English ISBN
1	July 4, 2017	978-4-08-881185-7	September 22, 2020 (digital)	978-1-9747-1364-6
01. "I'm Not Going to Play Golf"; 02. "Morning Robo"; 03. "Golf Course Debut"; 04. "Yozan × Robo"; 05. "Uncomfortable"; 06. "Conclusion"; 07. "Joining the Club"
2	October 4, 2017	978-4-08-881217-5	September 22, 2020 (digital)	978-1-9747-1743-9
08. "Robot × Rion"; 09. "Snake"; 10. "Learning"; 11. "The Secret of the Laser Beam"; 12. "Motivation"; 13. "Contact"; 14. "Declare War"; 15. "Declaration of War"; 16. "Robo Offense"
3	December 4, 2017	978-4-08-881282-3	September 22, 2020 (digital)	978-1-9747-2271-6
17. "Powerful Rival"; 18. "Group 2 and Group 5"; 19. "Emergency"; 20. "The Second Half Begins"; 21. "Strategy"; 22. "Counterattack"; 23. "Groups 1-4 Hole Out"; 24. "Resolution"; 25. "Post-Golf Bath"
4	March 2, 2018	978-4-08-881359-2	September 22, 2020 (digital)	978-1-9747-2272-3
26. "Robo and Fried Dough"; 27. "The World of Pros"; 28. "Reunion"; 29. "Yozan's Strength"; 30. "Resolution"; 31. "Debut Match"; 32. "Daizon Open Preliminary Round, Part 1"; 33. "Daizon Open Preliminary Round, Part 2"; 34. "Daizon Open Preliminary Round, Part 3"
5	May 2, 2018	978-4-08-881409-4	September 22, 2020 (digital)	978-1-9747-2273-0
35. "Last Day of the Daizon Open, Part 1"; 36. "Last Day of the Daizon Open, Part 2"; 37. "Last Day of the Daizon Open, Part 3"; 38. "Last Day of the Daizon Open, Part 4"; 39. "Last Day of the Daizon Open, Part 5"; 40. "Last Day of the Daizon Open, Part 6"; 41. "Last Day of the Daizon Open, Part 7"; 42. "Last Day of the Daizon Open, Part 8"; 43. "Last Day of the Daizon Open, Part 9 (End of the Match)"
6	July 4, 2018	978-4-08-881514-5	September 22, 2020 (digital)	978-1-9747-2274-7
44. "Time for the Post-Golf Game Bath"; 45. "Ginro × Robo"; 46. "Robo Fever"; 47. "Here Comes the Star Performer"; 48. "Rival × Rival"; 49. "The Curtain Rises"; 50. "The Wolf's Sense of Smell"; 51. "Don Traps"; 52. "Robo Breaks Down"
7	September 4, 2018	978-4-08-881568-8	September 22, 2020 (digital)	978-1-9747-2275-4
53. "Breaking the Don's Traps"; 54. "One-in-a-Million Chance"; 55. "On the Brink"; 56. "Robo 200%"; 57. "Catching Up"; 58. "The Game is Up"; 59. "The Destination of the Approach"; 60. "Final Hole"; 61. "Last Shot"; 62. "Promised Land"

== Reception ==
The manga had 460,000 copies in circulation by December 2017. By May 2018, the manga had 700,000 copies in circulation.
