= Kuroko's Basketball The Movie: Last Game =

- Japanese movie poster

Japanese name
- Kanji: 劇場版 黒子のバスケ LAST GAME
Transcriptions
- Revised Hepburn: Gekijō-ban Kuroko no Basuke: Rasuto Gēmu
- Directed by: Shunsuke Tada
- Written by: Noboru Takagi; Tadatoshi Fujimaki
- Based on: Kuroko’s Basketball by Tadatoshi Fujimaki
- Starring: Kenshō Ono; Yūki Ono; Chiwa Saito; Daisuke Ono; Hikaru Midorikawa; Hiroshi Kamiya; Junichi Suwabe; Kenichi Suzumura; Ryohei Kimura; Tetsu Inada; Fumiko Orikasa; Shinichiro Miki; Kōsuke Toriumi; Yoshimasa Hosoya; Tatsuhisa Suzuki
- Cinematography: Eiji Arai
- Edited by: Junichi Uematsu
- Music by: Yoshihiro Ike
- Production company: Production I.G
- Distributed by: Shochiku
- Release date: March 18, 2017
- Running time: 90 minutes
- Country: Japan
- Language: Japanese
- Box office: ¥1 billion

Kuroko's Basketball The Movie: Last Game (Japanese: 劇場版 黒子のバスケ LAST GAME, Hepburn: Gekijō-ban Kuroko no Basuke Rasuto Gēmu) is a 2017 Japanese animated sports film produced by Production I.G and distributed by Shochiku. This is the first film in the Kuroko's Basketball franchise, created by Tadatoshi Fujimaki. It was released in Japanese cinemas on March 18, 2017. ODEX later screened the film in Singapore and Malaysia on May 4, 2017, Philippines on May 17, 2017, Indonesia on May 17, 2017, and Vietnam on July 18, 2017. The film began streaming on Netflix on November 14, 2021, with an English dub.

== Synopsis ==
The U.S. street basketball team named Jabberwock (ジャバウォック, Jabau~okku) came to Japan and played a friendly match with the Japanese team Strky (スターキー, Sutākī), but after the Japanese team suffered a crushing defeat, Jabberwock team members began to mock the Japanese basketball. Their comments infuriated Riko's father, so he assembled a team of five Generation of Miracles members plus Tetsuya Kuroko and Taiga Kagami, called Vorpal Swords (ヴォルパル・ソード, Voruparu Sōdo), to perform a revenge match against Jabberwock.

== Voice cast ==
=== Vorpal Swords ===
Character	Voice actor	
Character	Japanese	English
Tetsuya Kuroko (黒子 テツヤ, Kuroko Tetsuya)	Kenshō Ono	Khoi Dao
Taiga Kagami (火神 大我, Kagami Taiga)	Yūki Ono	Zeno Robinson
Shintarō Midorima (緑間 真太郎, Midorima Shintarō)	Daisuke Ono	Daman Mills
Seijūrō Akashi (赤司 征十郎, Akashi Seijūrō)	Hiroshi Kamiya	Aleks Le
Daiki Aomine (青峰 大輝, Aomine Daiki)	Junichi Suwabe	Ben Diskin
Atsushi Murasakibara (紫原 敦, Murasakibara Atsushi)	Kenichi Suzumura	Robbie Daymond
Ryōta Kise (黄瀬 涼太, Kise Ryōta)	Ryohei Kimura	Erik Scott Kimerer
Riko Aida (相田 リコ, Aida Riko)	Chiwa Saito	Abby Trott
Satsuki Momoi (桃井 さつき, Momoi Satsuki)	Fumiko Orikasa	Xanthe Huynh
Kagetora Aida (相田 景虎, Aida Kagetora)	Shinichiro Miki	Keith Silverstein
Kousuke Wakamatsu (若松 孝輔, Wakamatsu Kousuke)	Kōsuke Toriumi	Jonah Scott
Junpei Hyūga (日向 順平, Hyūga Junpei)	Yoshimasa Hosoya	Alan Lee
Kazunari Takao (高尾 和成, Takao Kazunari)	Tatsuhisa Suzuki	Sean Chiplock

=== Jabberwock ===
Nash Gold Jr. (ナッシュ・ゴールド・Jr., Nasshu Gōrudo Jr.)
Voiced by: Hikaru Midorikawa (Japanese); David Matranga (English)
Captain of the American basketball team Jabberwock, Gold has a two-faced personality. Outside the court, he was calm, polite, and even charming. However, as a player in court Gold is cruel and rude. Nash also seems to have a darker personality when he becomes serious, which can be seen when he revealed his "Belial Eye" to Akashi. Gold becomes even more arrogant, saying that even God cannot defeat it.
Jason Silver (ジェイソン・シルバー, Jeison Shirubā)
Voiced by: Tetsu Inada (Japanese); Kane Jungbluth-Murry (English)
One of the members of the American basketball team Jabberwock. Arrogant and ignorant, Silver calls himself the "Almighty Me". He is also sociable, only to have a lot of interest in women. Silver will not care about the people around him, unless it is Gold Jr. will be the one who did it. He also tends to mock those whom he considers weak.

== Production ==
The ending theme song of this film is "Glorious Days" sung by Granrodeo.

== Reception ==
=== Box office ===
Kuroko's Basketball The Movie: Last Game opened in Japan on March 18 on 91 screens. The company sold 124,000 tickets on the weekend for ¥190 million (about US$1.7 million). The film was ranked sixth in attendance on average per screen in its opening weekend, having been defeated by Pretty Cure Dream Stars! by Izumi Todo – which debuted the same week – and beat Sword Art Online The Movie: Ordinal Scale by Reki Kawahara as well as Your Name by Makoto Shinkai. As of May 15, 2017, the film has grossed a total of over ¥1 billion from 752,856 admissions.

=== Controversy ===
On May 17, 2017, GSC Movies posted that the parts of the film were supposedly recorded during the Malaysian screening time, and posted online. GSC Movies later wrote the apology statement that it was "greatly threatening" to ODEX, GSC Movies and Japanese film copyright holders.
