= Learning with Manga! Fate/Grand Order =

Japanese web manga series

Learning with Manga! Fate/Grand Order (Note: Known in Japan as Manga de Wakaru! Fate/Grand Order (マンガで分かる！Fate/Grand Order)) (Note: Also sometimes known as Learn with Manga! Fate/Grand Order or Understanding with Manga! Fate/Grand Order in English.) is a Japanese web manga series by artist Riyo. It is an official parody of the mobile game Fate/Grand Order, and also initially served as an explanation guide for new players before developing its own storyline. The manga received two sequel series, More Learning with Manga! Fate/Grand Order and Even More Learning with Manga! Fate/Grand Order.

== Premise ==
The official English logo for Learning with Manga! depicting the characters Saber (left) and Gudako (right). Note the chibi style of the characters.

Fate/Grand Order is mobile role-playing video game for iOS and Android that was released in 2015 in Japan and 2017 in the United States. In the game, the player takes on the role of a "Master" who summons "servants" to fight against enemies. These "servants", also known in-game as "heroic spirits", are characters based on figures from real-life history, mythology, and literature, as well as other original characters from the Fate franchise. Servants are summoned through a gacha system, in which players pay for a chance to summon characters with in-game currency that can earned by progressing through the game or by purchasing it with real money.

Learning with Manga! was originally created to serve as a way of explaining various gameplay concepts of Fate/Grand Order to new players in a humorous way with chibi interpretations of the characters. The plot of Learning with Manga! initially closely followed the plot of the main Fate/Grand Order game, but eventually developed its own plotline and characters. Several original characters from the Learning with Manga! Fate/Grand Order manga have been added to the main Fate/Grand Order game during special crossover events. These include characters based on Paul Bunyan and Mary Anning.

Learning with Manga! parodies the story, characters, and players of Fate/Grand Order. The main character of the series, Gudako, (Note: Japanese: ぐだ子, lit. 'boring girl') is a caricature of Fate/Grand Order's female protagonist Ritsuka Fujimaru. In Learning with Manga!, she is depicted as a deranged gacha-addict who berates and sexually harasses her servants. This characterization, which parodies the most extreme negative stereotypes of gacha gamers and Fate/Grand Order players, has been positively received by fans.

== In print ==
In Japan, Learning with Manga! has received four print collections published by Kadokawa. The first print collection was released in August 2017.

マンガで分かる！Fate/Grand Order Volumes
No.	Release Date	ISBN	Ref.
1	August 2, 2017	ISBN 9784041061015	
2	May 25, 2019	ISBN 9784041082263	
3	April 26, 2022	ISBN 9784041115688	
4	August 10, 2023	ISBN 9784041140055	

== In other media ==
Good Smile Company released several lines of Nendoroid style figures of Learning with Manga!'s chibi-style Fate/Grand Order characters. On December 31, 2018, a 15-minute original net animation based on Learning with Manga! aired during the Fate Project New Year's Eve TV Special in Japan. The animated short was also uploaded to the official Japanese Fate/Grand Order YouTube channel. A version of animation with English subtitles was uploaded to the official Aniplex USA YouTube channel in 2020.

In 2022, as part of the Fifth Anniversary celebration for the game Fate/Grand Order, Aniplex and Lasengle opened a Learning with Manga! themed metaverse space.
