= Kuroko's Basketball =

Japanese manga series

- Cover of the first tankōbon volume, featuring Tetsuya Kuroko (front), Riko Aida (bottom), Taiga Kagami (center), Junpei Hyuga (right), Shun Izuki (left of Hyuga), and Shinji Koganei (left of Izuki)

黒子のバスケ (Kuroko no Basuke)
- Genre: Comedy; Sports
- Manga
- Written by: Tadatoshi Fujimaki
- Published by: Shueisha
- English publisher: NA: Viz Media
- Imprint: Jump Comics
- Magazine: Weekly Shōnen Jump
- Original run: December 8, 2008 – September 1, 2014
- Volumes: 30
- Light novel
- Written by: Sawako Hirabayashi
- Illustrated by: Tadatoshi Fujimaki
- Published by: Shueisha
- Original run: March 4, 2011 – September 4, 2015
- Volumes: 6
- Anime television series
- Directed by: Shunsuke Tada
- Written by: Noburo Takagi
- Music by: Ryosuke Nakanishi (S1); R・O・N (S1); Alpha Eastman (S1); Yoshihiro Ike (S2–3)
- Studio: Production I.G
- Licensed by: Netflix (Note: Bang Zoom! English dub rights.); NA: Crunchyroll (Note: Formerly known as Funimation.); SEA: Medialink
- Original network: MBS, Tokyo MX, BS11
- English network: PH: ABS-CBN, Yey!; SEA: Animax Asia
- Original run: April 7, 2012 – June 30, 2015
- Episodes: 75 + 3 OVA
- Manga

Kuroko's Basketball: Extra Game
- Written by: Tadatoshi Fujimaki
- Published by: Shueisha
- Magazine: Jump Next!
- Original run: December 29, 2014 – March 3, 2016
- Volumes: 2
- Anime film series

Kuroko's Basketball: Winter Cup Compilation
- Directed by: Shunsuke Tada
- Written by: Noburo Takagi
- Music by: Yoshihiro Ike
- Studio: Production I.G
- Licensed by: NA: Crunchyroll; SEA: Medialink
- Released: September 3, 2016 (I); October 8, 2016 (II); December 3, 2016 (III)
- Runtime: 90 minutes (I); 88 minutes (II); 90 minutes (III)
- Anime film

Kuroko's Basketball The Movie: Last Game
- Directed by: Shunsuke Tada
- Written by: Noburo Takagi; Tadatoshi Fujimaki
- Music by: Yoshihiro Ike
- Studio: Production I.G
- Licensed by: Netflix; NA: Crunchyroll; SEA: Medialink
- Released: March 18, 2017
- Runtime: 90 minutes
- icon

Kuroko's Basketball (Japanese: 黒子のバスケ, Hepburn: Kuroko no Basuke) is a Japanese sports manga series written and illustrated by Tadatoshi Fujimaki. It was serialized in Shueisha's shōnen manga magazine Weekly Shōnen Jump from December 2008 to September 2014, with its chapters collected in 30 tankōbon volumes. It tells the story of a high school basketball team trying to make it to the national tournament.

An anime television series adaptation by Production I.G aired for three seasons from April 2012 to June 2015. A sequel manga, Kuroko's Basketball: Extra Game, was serialized in Jump Next! from December 2014 to March 2016. An anime film adaptation of the Kuroko's Basketball: Extra Game manga premiered in March 2017. A stage play adaptation opened in April 2016 followed by more stage adaptations.

The manga has been licensed for English-language release by Viz Media in North America. By November 2020, Kuroko's Basketball had over 31 million copies in circulation, making it one of the best-selling manga series.

== Plot ==
The Teiko Middle School basketball team achieves dominance in Japanese middle school basketball, securing three consecutive national championships. Its star players, collectively known as the "Generation of Miracles", gain nationwide recognition for their talent. Upon graduating, the five players—Ryota Kise, Shintaro Midorima, Daiki Aomine, Atsushi Murasakibara, and Seijuro Akashi—enroll at separate high schools with elite basketball programs. Rumors persist of a sixth member, a phantom player whose existence remains unconfirmed. This player, Tetsuya Kuroko, later joins Seirin High, a newly established school with an emerging team. Alongside Taiga Kagami, a player raised primarily in the United States, Kuroko seeks to elevate Seirin to national prominence by challenging his former teammates.

Seirin's first major test comes against Ryota Kise in a practice match. Kise's ability to replicate and enhance Kagami's techniques initially overwhelms Seirin, but Kuroko's unique skills help bridge the gap, securing a narrow victory. The team then faces Shutoku High in the Interhigh preliminaries, where Shintaro Midorima's superior shooting and Takao Kazunari's Hawk Eyes neutralize Kuroko's misdirection. Despite the challenge, Seirin prevails, only to suffer a crushing defeat against Touhou Academy, led by Daiki Aomine. Losses to Senshinkan and Meisei follow, eliminating Seirin from the tournament. However, the arrival of Teppei Kiyoshi, Seirin's founding member and considered as part of the "Uncrowned Kings" (players that would have been considered prodigies, had the "Generation of Miracles" never existed), revitalizes the team. Intensive summer training prepares them for the Winter Cup, including an unexpected rematch with Touhou during their preparations.

In the Winter Cup preliminaries, Seirin and Shutoku battle to a draw, forcing Seirin to defeat Kirisaki Daichi High to advance. Kirisaki's captain, Makoto Hanamiya, a member of the Uncrowned Kings, employs ruthless tactics, but Seirin overcomes these underhanded methods to secure their Winter Cup berth. The tournament begins with a rematch against Touhou Academy. Kagami, now more determined than ever, pushes himself to surpass Aomine. Through Kuroko's newly developed Vanishing Drive and Kagami's refined teamwork, Seirin achieves a historic victory, marking Aomine's first-ever loss. The defeat rekindles Aomine's passion for the sport, dispelling his disillusionment with basketball.

Next, Seirin confronts Yōsen High, anchored by Atsushi Murasakibara's towering defense. Murasakibara's physical dominance initially stifles Seirin's offense, but Kagami unlocks the Zone, matching his opponent's power and leading Seirin to victory. Though defeated, Murasakibara gains a newfound respect for the game, inspired by Kagami's relentless drive.

The final challenge arrives against Rakuzan High, led by Seijuro Akashi, the Generation of Miracles' formidable leader. Akashi's Emperor Eye allows him to anticipate and control every play, overwhelming both Kagami and Kuroko. However, Kagami enters the "true Zone" with Kuroko as his gatekeeper, while Kuroko perfects his Phantom Shot. Together, they dismantle Rakuzan's dominance, securing victory in the Winter Cup and cementing Seirin as Japan's top high school team.

Following the tournament, the Generation of Miracles begin to reconcile their fractured relationships, rediscovering the joy of basketball beyond mere individual supremacy. Kuroko fulfills his ambition not by standing in the spotlight, but by ensuring his teammates shine brightest together.

== Media ==
=== Manga ===
Written and illustrated by Tadatoshi Fujimaki, Kuroko's Basketball was serialized in the shōnen manga anthology Weekly Shōnen Jump from December 8, 2008, to September 1, 2014. The 275 individual chapters were collected and published into 30 tankōbon volumes by its publisher Shueisha, the first on April 3, 2009, and the last on December 4, 2014. A crossover chapter between the series and Kawada's Hinomaru Sumo, with a script written by Ichirō Takahashi, was published in the magazine on November 9, 2015. Kawada was formerly an assistant to Fujimaki on Kuroko's Basketball.

Fujimaki began a sequel titled Kuroko's Basketball: Extra Game (黒子のバスケ EXTRA GAME) in Jump Next! on December 29, 2014. On December 27, 2015, Tadashi announced that he will end Kuroko's Basketball: Extra Game manga in the next issue in early March 2016. At their New York Comic Con panel, North American publisher Viz Media announced their license to the manga. They began releasing the series in 2-in-1 editions in 2016.

=== Anime ===
An anime adaptation based on the manga was produced by Production I.G. The series premiered on April 7, 2012, and ended on September 22, 2012. On April 5, 2012, Crunchyroll announced that they would simulcast the anime as part of their spring lineup of anime titles. As of September 22, 2012, the anime ended with a total of 25 episodes. The second season premiered on October 6, 2013 and ended on March 29, 2014, also with 25 episodes. The DVD and Blu-ray version of the second season was released on June 20, 2014, along with an episode which was designed around a specific chapter in the manga by Tadatoshi Fujimaki by working on chapter 124, and a bonus CD with an audio drama starring Satsuki Momoi. The third season premiered on January 10, 2015, and ended on June 30, 2015, with a total of 25 episodes. Three compilation films that compiled the anime series' Winter Cup arc opened in Japan in 2016. The first compilation film opened on September 3, 2016, titled Winter Cup Compilation ~Shadow and Light~, the second compilation film opened on October 8, 2016, titled Winter Cup Compilation ~Beyond the Tears~, and the third compilation film opened on December 3, 2016, titled Winter Cup Compilation ~Crossing the Door~.

An animated film adaptation was announced at the KuroBas Cup 2015 event on September 20, 2015. The film, titled Kuroko's Basketball The Movie: Last Game, adapts the Kuroko's Basketball: Extra Game manga. It was released in Japanese theaters on March 18, 2017. The staff and cast from the previous seasons returned to reprise their roles in the film.

On October 19, 2020, the SAG-AFTRA listed and approved an English dub for the series under the "Netflix Dubbing Agreement". The first season's English dub debuted on Netflix on January 15, 2021, with its second season on May 15, its third season on September 18, and the Last Game film's English dub on November 15.

=== Light novels ===
Six series of light novels have been written by Sawako Hirabayashi called Kuroko's Basketball: Replace and illustrated by Fujimaki. Each light novel focuses on the members of the Generation of Miracles. The first light novel Replace was released on March 4, 2011. A manga adaptation of the novel series illustrated by Ichirō Takahashi began on Shōnen Jump+ in January 2015.

=== Audio CDs ===
The music for the Kuroko's Basketball anime series were directed by four different composers. Ryosuke Nakanishi, R・O・N, and Alpha Eastman (21–25) were in charge of the first season while Yoshihiro Ike was in charge of the second and third seasons.

=== Video games ===
Three video games based on Kuroko's Basketball have been released. The first game Kuroko's Basketball: Kiseki no Game (黒子のバスケ キセキの試合, Kuroko no Basuke Kiseki no Gēmu; Kuroko's Basketball: Miracle Game) was released on August 9, 2012, for PlayStation Portable. A second game Kuroko's Basketball: Shōri e no Kiseki (黒子のバスケ -勝利へのキセキ-; Kuroko's Basketball: The Path to Victory) was released on February 20, 2014, for the Nintendo 3DS. Shōri e no Kiseki sold 45,681 copies in its first four days on sale. A third game Kuroko's Basketball: Mirai e no Kizuna (黒子のバスケ 未来へのキズナ; Kuroko's Basketball: Bonds for the Future) was released on March 26, 2015, for the Nintendo 3DS. Kuroko also appears as a support character in the Jump crossover fighting game J-Stars Victory VS. A mobile game by Fivecross, Kuroko no Basuke Street Rivals (黒子のバスケ Street Rivals), was released on November 16, 2023.

=== Stage plays ===
A series of 2.5D musical stage plays began in 2016. Kensho Ono reprised his role as Kuroko from the anime series. Additions to the main cast included Yuuya Asato as Taiga and Shota Onume as Aomine. The plays were directed by Norihito Nakayashiki, who also directed Hyper Projection Engeki Haikyu!!.

Year	Dates & Locations	Title
2016	April 8 – April 22 (Tokyo)	Kuroko no Basuke: The Encounter
2017	June 22 – July 9 (Tokyo); July 13 – July 17 (Osaka)	Kuroko no Basuke: Over-Drive
2018	April 6 – April 22 (Tokyo); May 1 – May 6 (Osaka); May 11 – May 13 (Tokyo)	Kuroko no Basuke: Ignite-Zone
2019	April 30 – May 1 (Osaka); May 4 – May 5 (Aichi); May 7 – May 13 (Tokyo); May 18 – May 19 (Fukuoka)	Kuroko no Basuke: Ultimate Blaze

== Reception ==
The Kuroko's Basketball manga series sold nine million units in Japan by September 2012. In May 2013, the manga has over one million copies of volume 1 in print. By 2013, the manga had over 23 million copies in circulation, a number that grew to 27 million by April 2014. By November 2020, the series has over 31 million copies in circulation. Individual volumes frequently appeared on Oricon's weekly lists of the best-selling manga in Japan, and many of them were some of the best-selling manga in the year 2012. Kuroko's Basketball was the third best-selling manga series of 2013, with 8,761,081 copies sold in a year. In 2014, the 24th volume of the manga had received an initial print run of one million copies; and the 30th volume in 2015 had an initial print run of 700,000 copies printed. The Kuroko's Basketball light novel series also sold well in Japan in 2014. The first light novel Replace was the ninth best-selling light novel series, while it was the sixth best-selling light novel volume with 215,859 copies sold. DVD sales of the anime series have also been featured on Oricon's weekly Japanese anime DVD rankings various times.

Kuroko's Basketball is often compared to Weekly Shōnen Jump's earlier basketball-themed manga Slam Dunk. However, Azusa Takahashi of Real Sound pointed out whereas Slam Dunk was very realistic, the newer series is more focused on entertainment and is strongly based in fiction with each character having a "special move." The anime series was awarded the 2013 Tokyo Anime Award in the Television Category.

=== Controversies ===
After the anime began airing in 2012, the series became popular with dōjinshi circles, particularly for yaoi dōjinshi, though there is no yaoi in the series itself. Several events at which dōjinshi of the series were to be sold, as well as several other locations linked to the series and the author Tadatoshi Fujimaki, including a television station airing the anime, a convenience store chain selling items of the series, and Fujimaki's alma mater Sophia University, received threatening letters containing a powder or liquid substance. It is still unknown if it is one individual behind all the threatening letters, nor is the reason for the threats known. Multiple doujinshi events, including Comiket, banned content related to the series, barring creators from selling Kuroko's Basketball-themed doujinshi at their events. The suspect, who was later revealed to be a 36-year-old man named Hirofumi Watanabe, was eventually caught and was arrested on December 15, 2013. Due to the loss of Kuroko's Basketball dōjinshi because of the threats, there was a special event that specifically focused on dōjinshi related to the series affectionately named Kuroket, organized by the Comic Market Preparatory Committee, held during the Comiket Special 6 – Otaku Summit 2015 on March 29, 2015. The event hosted approx. 2400 dōjinshi circles.
