= Tadatoshi Fujimaki =

Japanese manga artist (born 1982)

- Born: June 9, 1982 (age 43); Tokyo, Japan
- Occupation: Manga artist
- Known for: Kuroko's Basketball, Robot × LaserBeam, Kill Blue

Tadatoshi Fujimaki (藤巻 忠俊, Fujimaki Tadatoshi; born June 9, 1982) is a Japanese manga artist, best known as the creator of sports manga Kuroko's Basketball and Robot × LaserBeam, as well as Kill Blue, all of which have been serialized in Weekly Shōnen Jump.

== Biography ==
Fujimaki attended Tokyo Metropolitan Toyama High School and enrolled in Sophia University.

In 2011, on Nikkei Entertainment's list of most successful manga artist's he ranked 25th.

On October 16, 2013, threatening letters were sent to Fujimaki and high schools and colleges affiliated with him. The letters carried the message "If you do not stop the parody manga, you will get hydrogen sulfide", accompanying unknown powder substances. After the arrival of many other threat letters, Fujimaki eventually stated that he will continue the manga "no matter what". On December 16, 2013, the suspect was finally arrested. Not an acquaintance of Fujimaki, he told the police that he was "jealous of [author's] success."

== Works ==
Title	Japanese title/Romaji	Date	Volumes	Magazine
Kuroko's Basketball	黒子のバスケ; Kuroko no Basuke	December 8, 2008 – September 1, 2014	30	Weekly Shōnen Jump
Kuroko's Basketball: Extra Game	黒子のバスケ EXTRA GAME; Kuroko no Basuke Extra Game	December 29, 2014 – March 3, 2016	2	Jump Next!
Robot × LaserBeam	ROBOT×LASERBEAM	March 18, 2017 – June 25, 2018	7	Weekly Shōnen Jump
Kill Blue	キルアオ; Kiru Ao	April 17, 2023 – September 1, 2025	13	Weekly Shōnen Jump
