= Age of Elements =

- Developer(s): Steamroll
- Publisher(s): Atari
- Platform(s): PlayStation Portable
- Release: Cancelled
- Genre(s): Fighting
- Mode(s): Single-player, multiplayer

Age of Elements was a fighting video game developed by the newly created studio Steamroll and intended to be published by Atari for Sony's PlayStation Portable. It was cancelled in 2007.

== Gameplay ==
IGN described the game's premise as a fighting game that was a mix between Tekken and Powerstone. The game was to feature one on one battles with a shifting camera-view; when the two combatants were a large distance from one another, the camera would go into a third person, behind the back view, where the player could aim to shoot at the character, while when characters were in close proximity, the view shifted to a side by side view of both character commonly found in fighting video games. The game was planned to have multiple modes: a training mode for learning the game, a versus mode for basic fights, and a "story mode" to play through as well. Local multiplayer was planned, though online multiplayer was not.

== Development ==
The game was first announced in June 2006. It was debuted by publisher Atari at E3 2006, who described its production at the time as about 40% complete. The game was announced to be developed by a newly created development team named "Steamroll". The game was made playable at the event. The game was planned to have a "Winter 2006" release, (late 2006 to early 2007) on the PlayStation Portable handheld video game console, but the release was later cancelled in 2007.

== Reception ==
It was nominated for "Best Fighting Game" for IGN's "PSP Best of E3 2006", but lost to Tekken: Dark Resurrection. IGN described the game's premise as "promising and unique", but conceded that it was too early to make a call with the game less than half complete at the time of their preview. The game engine was specifically singled out as impressive, with IGN stating "Steamroll is already well ahead of the game with its graphics engine. The game was something of a stunner on PSP, running at an impressive framerate and full of special effects and special animations. Detail was good enough that we initially mistook the game for a straight-on 2D-done-with-polygons fighter..., Environments were expansive, filled with details such as running waterfalls and towering waterfalls in a fantasy outdoor environment as well as lit signs and identifiable store fronts in a battle set in a rustic town...with the size of its arenas, the abundant detail on character faces and outfits, and the special effects afforded by the smooth graphics engine, its looks are in line with a number of console 3D grapplers, here exclusively on PSP.
