= Fate/Grand Order – Absolute Demonic Front: Babylonia =

Japanese anime television series

- Official promotional poster

フェイト/グランドオーダー -絶対魔獣戦線バビロニア- (Feito/Gurando Ōdā – Zettai Majuu Sensen Babironia)
- Genre: Adventure, fantasy
- Created by: Kinoko Nasu; Type-Moon
- Anime television series
- Directed by: Toshifumi Akai
- Produced by: Shizuka Kurosaki
- Written by: Fūta Takei; Chiaki Nagai; Ukyō Kodachi; Yūichirō Higashide; Hikaru Sakurai
- Music by: Keita Haga; Ryo Kawasaki
- Studio: CloverWorks
- Licensed by: NA: Aniplex of America
- Original network: Tokyo MX, BS11, GTV, GYT, MBS
- Original run: October 5, 2019 – March 21, 2020
- Episodes: 21 + 1 special
- icon

Fate/Grand Order - Absolute Demonic Front: Babylonia (Japanese: Fate/Grand Order -絶対魔獣戦線バビロニア-, Hepburn: Feito/Gurando Ōdā - Zettai Majuu Sensen Babironia) is a Japanese fantasy anime television series produced by CloverWorks. Part of Type-Moon's Fate franchise, it is an adaptation of the "Babylonia" chapter from the role-playing mobile game Fate/Grand Order. The series aired in Japan on October 5, 2019, to March 21, 2020.

== Plot ==
A.D. 2016, the foundations of humanity have been incinerated by the Mage King Solomon. Chaldea, a secret mages organization with the mission to preserve humanity's future, foresaw mankind's extinction in 2015. Thus commenced the operation to repair the Singularities in history caused by Holy Grails dispersed across time and space—Operation Grand Order. Using the Rayshift time travel technology, Chaldea's last master Ritsuka Fujimaru and his demi-servant Mash Kyrielight have traveled to and resolved six Singularities. Now, they depart for their most dangerous destination yet: a civilization in the Age of Gods, B.C. 2655 Mesopotamia. Ritsuka and Mash soon discover that Demonic Beasts roam the land with the three Goddess alliance, attacking people and towns. Amidst chaos and terror lies humanity's last defense—Uruk, a fortress city that acts as the frontline for the battle against the beasts. The battlefront is commanded by none other than King Gilgamesh, the King of Heroes, who took on the role of a mage and summoned heroic spirits to protect his city.

== Production ==
Fate/Grand Order - Absolute Demonic Front: Babylonia was first announced on July 29, 2018, by Aniplex as an adaptation of the "Order VII: The Absolute Frontline in the War Against the Demonic Beasts: Babylonia" quest from Fate/Grand Order. Aniplex had previously launched a survey in January, asking fans what their favorite quest was, and what kind of future development they'd like to see for the franchise; the "Babylonia" quest and "TV anime" ranked first respectively. The anime is produced by CloverWorks. Toshifumi Akai is directing the series, while Miyuki Kuroki serves as assistant director, Takashi Takeuchi serves as lead character designer, Tomoaki Takase handles character designs, and Keita Haga and Ryo Kawasaki compose the series' music.

=== Writing ===
In an interview for Newtype magazine, CloverWorks producer Yūichi Fukushima stated that while the anime adaptation does not cover the beginning of the video game, it will be accessible even to those who do not play the game. Shizuka Kurosaki said also that "Think of each adaptation as a different take on Chaldea and the Singularity. You don't need to watch the TV series before the films."

== Media ==
=== Anime ===
The anime aired from October 5, 2019, to March 21, 2020, on Tokyo MX, BS11, GTV, GYT, and MBS for 21 episodes. A special episode titled Episode 0: Initium Iter, which takes place before the events of the anime, was revealed on the "Fate/Grand Order Fes. 2019 ~Chaldea Park~" event on August 3, 2019, and was later streamed in Japan through the Fate/Grand Order smartphone game from August 4 to August 11, 2019. Aniplex of America licensed the series in North America, and is streaming the series on FunimationNow streaming service, with AnimeLab streaming the series in Australia and New Zealand. Funimation will also have a 30-day exclusivity on the simulcast, with a one-year exclusivity to the English dub. Aniplex of America also hosted the premiere of the first two episodes at the Aratani Theatre in Los Angeles on September 29, 2019. Unison Square Garden performed the series' opening theme song "Phantom Joke". Eir Aoi performed the series' first ending theme song "Hoshi ga furu Yume" (星が降るユメ; "Dreams in the Falling Stars") while milet performed the series' second ending theme song "Prover" and the third ending song "Tell me".
