= Sugō =

Sugō, Sugo or Sugou (written: 菅生) is a Japanese surname. Notable people with the surname include:

- Taisho Sugo (菅生 大将, born 1993), better known as Masaki Suda, Japanese actor and singer
- Takayuki Sugō (菅生 隆之, born 1952), Japanese voice actor

== Fictional characters ==
- Nobuyuki Sugō (須郷 伸之), a character in the light novel series Sword Art Online
