= List of Sword Art Online manga volumes =

Sword Art Online
- Created by: Reki Kawahara; Tamako Nakamura; Jūsei Minami; Hazuki Tsubasa; Neko Nekobyō; Kiseki Himura; Kōtarō Yamada; Shii Kiya; Hazuki Tsubasa; Kōtarō Yamada
- Owners: Dengeki Bunko and Dengeki G's Magazine/Comic (via ASCII Media Works); Yen Press (English)
- Years: 2012–present

Print publications
- Novels: Ongoing series: Re:Aincrad (2022–present) Unital Ring (2023–present) Gourmet Seekers (2024–present): Ended series: 4-koma (2012–2016) Fairy Dance (2012–2014) 4-koma Official Anthology (2012–2013) Comic Anthology (2013–2014) Progressive (2014–2022) Phantom Bullet (2014–2022) Girls' Ops (2014–2021) Mother's Rosario (2014–2016) Gun Gale Online (2016–2021) Kirito's Thousand and One Night Story (2017–2021) Project Alicization (2017–2021) Hollow Realization (2017–2019) Ordinal Scale (2017–2020) Kiss & Fly (2020–2023) Alicization Lycoris (2020–2021): One-off volumes: Aincrad (2012) Calibur (2015) Dengeki Comic Anthology (2017) Official Comic Anthology (2018) Memory Defrag Comic Anthology (2019) Unanswered//butterfly (2026)

There are twelve manga adaptations of Sword Art Online, all written by Reki Kawahara and published by ASCII Media Works. Sword Art Online: Aincrad (ソードアート・オンライン アインクラッド), illustrated by Tamako Nakamura, was serialized in Dengeki Bunko Magazine between the September 2010 and May 2012 issues. Two tankōbon volumes of Aincrad were released on September 27, 2012. A comedy four-panel manga, titled Sword Art Online. (そーどあーと☆おんらいん。) and illustrated by Jūsei Minami, began serialization in the September 2010 issue of Dengeki Bunko Magazine. The first volume of Sword Art Online. was released on September 27, 2012. A third manga, titled Sword Art Online: Fairy Dance (ソードアート・オンライン フェアリィ・ダンス) and illustrated by Hazuki Tsubasa, began serialization in the May 2012 issue of Dengeki Bunko Magazine. The first volume of Fairy Dance was released on October 27, 2012; the third volume was released on June 27, 2014. The Aincrad and Fairy Dance manga have been acquired for release in North America by Yen Press. The first volume of Aincrad was published on March 25, 2014.

A spin-off manga starring Lisbeth, Silica, Leafa, and Lux, titled Sword Art Online: Girls' Ops (ソードアート・オンライン ガールズ・オプス) and illustrated by Neko Nekobyō, began serialization in the July 2013 issue of Dengeki Bunko Magazine. Girls' Ops was licensed by Yen Press in November 2014, the first volume of which was released on May 19, 2015. A manga adaptation of Sword Art Online: Progressive, illustrated by Kiseki Himura, began serialization in the August 2013 issue of Dengeki G's Magazine. The manga ended serialization in the magazine's May 2014 issue and was transferred to Dengeki G's Comic starting with the June 2014 issue. The original series ended with the seventh volume, and a new one started, subtitled Progressive: Barcarolle of Froth. The Progressive manga adaption has been licensed by Yen Press, with the first two volumes released in January and April 2015, respectively.

A sixth manga, titled Sword Art Online: Phantom Bullet and illustrated by Kōtarō Yamada, had its first chapter serialized in the May 2014 issue of Dengeki Bunko Magazine, with following chapters being digitally serialized on Kadokawa's Comic Walker website. A seventh manga, titled Sword Art Online: Calibur and illustrated by Shii Kiya, was serialized in Dengeki G's Comic between the September 2014 and July 2015 issues. A single compilation volume was released on August 10, 2015. An eighth manga, titled Sword Art Online: Mother's Rosario and also by Hazuki Tsubasa, is based on the seventh volume of the novel series and began serialization in the July 2014 issue of Dengeki Bunko Magazine. A ninth manga, adapting Sword Art Online Alternative: Gun Gale Online, began serialization in the November 2015 issue of Dengeki Maoh.

A tenth manga, titled Sword Art Online: Project Alicization and illustrated by Kōtarō Yamada, based on the Alicization arc of the light novel series, began serialization in the September 2016 issue of Dengeki Bunko Magazine.

== Volumes ==
=== Sword Art Online: Aincrad ===
No.	Title	Original release date	English release date
1	Sword Art Online: Aincrad 1	September 27, 2012; 978-4-04-886906-5	March 25, 2014; 978-0-316-37123-0
2	Sword Art Online: Aincrad 2	September 27, 2012; 978-4-04-886907-2	March 25, 2014; 978-0-316-37123-0

=== Sword Art Online (4-koma) ===
No.	Title	Japanese release date	Japanese ISBN
1	Sword Art Online (4-koma) 1 Sōdoāto☆Onrain。 (1) (そーどあーと☆おんらいん。（１）)	September 27, 2012	978-4-04-886905-8
2	Sword Art Online (4-koma) 2 Sōdoāto☆Onrain。 (2) (そーどあーと☆おんらいん。（２）)	August 27, 2014	978-4-04-866925-2
3	Sword Art Online (4-koma) 3 Sōdoāto☆Onrain。 (3) (そーどあーと☆おんらいん。（３）)	September 27, 2016	978-4-04-892397-2

=== Sword Art Online: Fairy Dance ===
No.	Title	Original release date	English release date
1	Sword Art Online: Fairy Dance 1	October 27, 2012; 978-4-04-886976-8	June 24, 2014; 978-0-316-40738-0
2	Sword Art Online: Fairy Dance 2	August 27, 2013; 978-4-04-891911-1	November 18, 2014; 978-0-316-33655-0
3	Sword Art Online: Fairy Dance 3	June 27, 2014; 978-4-04-866685-5	March 24, 2015; 978-0-316-38373-8

=== 4-koma Official Anthology Sword Art Online ===
No.	Title	Japanese release date	Japanese ISBN
1	4-koma Official Anthology Sword Art Online	October 27, 2012	978-4-04-891108-5
2	4-koma Official Anthology Sword Art Online 2	February 27, 2013	978-4-04-891445-1
3	4-koma Official Anthology Sword Art Online 3	August 27, 2013	978-4-04-891834-3

=== Sword Art Online: Comic Anthology ===
No.	Title	Japanese release date	Japanese ISBN
1	Sword Art Online: Comic Anthology 1	May 27, 2013	978-4-04-891574-8
2	Sword Art Online: Comic Anthology 2	March 27, 2014	978-4-04-866489-9

=== Sword Art Online: Progressive ===
No.	Title	Original release date	English release date
1	Sword Art Online: Progressive 1	February 27, 2014; 978-4-04-866011-2	January 20, 2015; 978-0-316-25937-8
2	Sword Art Online: Progressive 2	July 10, 2014; 978-4-04-866705-0	April 21, 2015; 978-0-316-38377-6
3	Sword Art Online: Progressive 3	December 10, 2014; 978-4-04-869085-0	September 22, 2015; 978-0-316-34875-1
4	Sword Art Online: Progressive 4	August 10, 2015; 978-4-04-865304-6	March 22, 2016; 978-0-316-31465-7
5	Sword Art Online: Progressive 5	July 9, 2016; 978-4-04-892222-7	March 21, 2017; 978-0-316-46926-5
6	Sword Art Online: Progressive 6	June 9, 2017; 978-4-04-892922-6	January 30, 2018; 978-0-316-48012-3
7	Sword Art Online: Progressive 7	May 10, 2018; 978-4-04-893852-5	December 11, 2018; 978-1-9753-2919-8
8	Sword Art Online: Progressive: Barcarolle of Froth 1	December 10, 2018; 978-4-04-912230-5	November 3, 2020; 978-1-9753-1753-9
9	Sword Art Online: Progressive: Barcarolle of Froth 2	January 10, 2020; 978-4-04-912988-5	February 2, 2021; 978-1-9753-1755-3
10	Sword Art Online: Progressive: Scherzo of Deep Night 1	October 26, 2020; 978-4-04-913501-5	June 20, 2023; 978-1-9753-6109-9
11	Sword Art Online: Progressive: Scherzo of Deep Night 2	June 25, 2021; 978-4-04-913842-9	September 19, 2023; 978-1-9753-6111-2
12	Sword Art Online: Progressive: Scherzo of Deep Night 3	January 27, 2022; 978-4-04-914240-2	January 23, 2024; 978-1-9753-6113-6
13	Sword Art Online: Progressive: Canon of the Golden Rule 1	November 27, 2021; 978-4-04-914018-7	March 19, 2024; 978-1-9753-9100-3
14	Sword Art Online: Progressive: Canon of the Golden Rule 2	August 26, 2022; 978-4-04-914549-6	July 30, 2024; 978-1-9753-9102-7

=== Sword Art Online: Girls' Ops ===
No.	Title	Original release date	English release date
1	Sword Art Online: Girls' Ops 1	July 10, 2014; 978-4-04-866686-2	May 19, 2015; 978-0-316-34205-6
2	Sword Art Online: Girls' Ops 2	April 10, 2015; 978-4-04-865089-2	January 26, 2016; 978-0-316-26899-8
3	Sword Art Online: Girls' Ops 3	May 10, 2016; 978-4-04-892104-6	November 29, 2016; 978-0-316-55267-7
4	Sword Art Online: Girls' Ops 4	February 10, 2017; 978-4-04-892688-1	October 31, 2017; 978-0-316-44197-1
5	Sword Art Online: Girls' Ops 5	February 10, 2018; 978-4-04-893650-7	March 19, 2019; 978-1-9753-0375-4
6	Sword Art Online: Girls' Ops 6	February 9, 2019; 978-4-04-912387-6	September 24, 2019; 978-1-9753-3220-4
7	Sword Art Online: Girls' Ops 7	August 26, 2020; 978-4-04-913365-3	June 8, 2021; 978-1-9753-2585-5
8	Sword Art Online: Girls' Ops 8	May 27, 2021; 978-4-04-913818-4	September 6, 2022; 978-1-9753-4284-5

=== Sword Art Online: Phantom Bullet ===
No.	Title	Original release date	English release date
1	Sword Art Online: Phantom Bullet 1	September 10, 2014; 978-4-04-866926-9	January 26, 2016; 978-0-316-26888-2
2	Sword Art Online: Phantom Bullet 2	September 10, 2015; 978-4-04-865315-2	April 26, 2016; 978-0-316-31495-4
3	Sword Art Online: Phantom Bullet 3	September 10, 2016; 978-4-04-892435-1	September 19, 2017; 978-0-316-43974-9
4	Sword Art Online: Phantom Bullet 4	February 26, 2022; 978-4-04-914247-1	January 17, 2023; 978-1-9753-6175-4

=== Sword Art Online: Mother's Rosario ===
No.	Title	Original release date	English release date
1	Sword Art Online: Mother's Rosario 1	December 10, 2014; 978-4-04-869156-7	March 22, 2016; 978-0-316-27033-5
2	Sword Art Online: Mother's Rosario 2	August 10, 2015; 978-4-04-865316-9	June 28, 2016; 978-0-316-27235-3
3	Sword Art Online: Mother's Rosario 3	June 10, 2016; 978-4-04-892109-1	September 19, 2017; 978-0-316-43975-6

=== Sword Art Online: Calibur ===
No.	Title	Original release date	English release date
1	Sword Art Online: Calibur	August 10, 2015; 978-4-04-865303-9	December 12, 2017; 978-0-316-44256-5

=== Sword Art Online Alternative Gun Gale Online ===
No.	Title	Original release date	English release date
1	Sword Art Online Alternative Gun Gale Online 1	October 8, 2016; 978-4-04-892373-6	November 14, 2017; 978-0-316-44241-1
2	Sword Art Online Alternative Gun Gale Online 2	November 10, 2017; 978-4-04-893446-6	July 24, 2018; 978-1-9753-2650-0
3	Sword Art Online Alternative Gun Gale Online 3	November 10, 2018; 978-4-04-912180-3	June 18, 2019; 978-1-9753-5765-8
4	Sword Art Online Alternative Gun Gale Online 4	March 27, 2021; 978-4-04-913771-2	January 25, 2022; 978-1-9753-1406-4

=== Sword Art Online: Kirito's Thousand and One Night Story ===
No.	Title	Japanese release date	Japanese ISBN
1	Sword Art Online: Kirito's Aincrad Night; Kirito no Sen'yaichiyamonogatari (キリトの千夜一夜物語(アインクラッドナイト))	March 10, 2017	978-4-04-892723-9
2	Sword Art Online: Kirito's Gun Gale Wars; Kirito no Sen'yaichiya Sōdō (キリトの千夜一夜騒動(ガンゲイルウォーズ))	February 9, 2019	978-4-04-912348-7

=== Sword Art Online: Hollow Realization ===
No.	Title	Original release date	English release date
1	Sword Art Online: Hollow Realization 1	March 27, 2017; 978-4-04-892772-7	November 13, 2018; 978-1-9753-5474-9
2	Sword Art Online: Hollow Realization 2	September 27, 2017; 978-4-04-893361-2	February 19, 2019; 978-1-9753-2788-0
3	Sword Art Online: Hollow Realization 3	March 27, 2018; 978-4-04-893717-7	May 21, 2019; 978-1-9753-2791-0
4	Sword Art Online: Hollow Realization 4	September 27, 2018; 978-4-04-893821-1	August 20, 2019; 978-1-9753-0554-3
5	Sword Art Online: Hollow Realization 5	March 27, 2019; 978-4-04-912308-1	December 24, 2019; 978-1-9753-0613-7
6	Sword Art Online: Hollow Realization 6	October 25, 2019; 978-4-04-912658-7	August 18, 2020; 978-1-9753-1558-0

=== Sword Art Online: Ordinal Scale ===
No.	Title	Original release date	English release date
1	Sword Art Online: Ordinal Scale 1	April 27, 2017; 978-4-04-892650-8	February 18, 2025; 979-8-8554-1176-8
2	Sword Art Online: Ordinal Scale 2	January 27, 2018; 978-4-04-893371-1	May 27, 2025; 979-8-8554-1178-2
3	Sword Art Online: Ordinal Scale 3	October 26, 2018; 978-4-04-893822-8	November 25, 2025; 979-8-8554-1180-5
4	Sword Art Online: Ordinal Scale 4	June 26, 2019; 978-4-04-912449-1	May 26, 2026; 979-8-8554-1182-9
5	Sword Art Online: Ordinal Scale 5	May 27, 2020; 978-4-04-913049-2	November 24, 2026; 979-8-8554-1184-3

=== Sword Art Online: Dengeki Comic Anthology ===
No.	Title	Japanese release date	Japanese ISBN
1	Sword Art Online: Dengeki Comic Anthology 1	June 9, 2017	978-4-04-892926-4
2	Sword Art Online: Dengeki Comic Anthology 2	October 7, 2017	978-4-04-893382-7

=== Sword Art Online: Project Alicization ===
No.	Title	Original release date	English release date
1	Sword Art Online: Project Alicization 1	October 7, 2017; 978-4-04-893481-7	December 8, 2020; 978-1-9753-1817-8
2	Sword Art Online: Project Alicization 2	October 10, 2018; 978-4-04-912095-0	March 2, 2021; 978-1-9753-1819-2
3	Sword Art Online: Project Alicization 3	August 10, 2019; 978-4-04-912788-1	June 29, 2021; 978-1-9753-1821-5
4	Sword Art Online: Project Alicization 4	August 26, 2020; 978-4-04-913388-2	March 22, 2022; 978-1-9753-4178-7
5	Sword Art Online: Project Alicization 5	August 27, 2021; 978-4-04-913914-3	July 5, 2022; 978-1-9753-4532-7

=== Sword Art Online: Official Comic Anthology ===
No.	Title	Japanese release date	Japanese ISBN
1	Sword Art Online: Official Comic Anthology 1	March 10, 2018	978-4-04-893773-3
2	Sword Art Online: Official Comic Anthology 2	August 9, 2018	978-4-04-893985-0

=== Sword Art Online: Memory Defrag Comic Anthology ===
No.	Title	Japanese release date	Japanese ISBN
1	Sword Art Online: Memory Defrag Comic Anthology	April 26, 2019	978-4-04-912365-4

=== Sword Art Online: Kiss & Fly ===
No.	Title	Original release date	English release date
1	Sword Art Online: Kiss & Fly 1	March 10, 2020; 978-4-04-913106-2	June 18, 2024; 978-1-9753-6574-5
2	Sword Art Online: Kiss & Fly 2	November 10, 2022; 978-4-04-914717-9	October 15, 2024; 978-1-9753-7515-7
3	Sword Art Online: Kiss & Fly 3	July 10, 2023; 978-4-04-915178-7	January 21, 2025; 978-1-9753-9472-1

=== Sword Art Online: Alicization Lycoris ===
No.	Title	Japanese release date	Japanese ISBN
1	Sword Art Online: Alicization Lycoris 1	May 27, 2020	978-4-04-913178-9
2	Sword Art Online: Alicization Lycoris 2	December 26, 2020	978-4-04-913557-2
3	Sword Art Online: Alicization Lycoris 3	July 27, 2021	978-4-04-913887-0

=== Sword Art Online: Re:Aincrad ===
No.	Title	Original release date	English release date
1	Sword Art Online: Re:Aincrad 1	April 27, 2022; 978-4-04-914388-1	May 21, 2024; 978-1-9753-9704-3
2	Sword Art Online: Re:Aincrad 2	March 10, 2023; 978-4-04-914913-5	December 10, 2024; 979-8-8554-0393-0
3	Sword Art Online: Re:Aincrad 3	January 9, 2024; 978-4-04-915455-9	April 22, 2025; 979-8-8554-1470-7
4	Sword Art Online: Re:Aincrad 4	November 9, 2024; 978-4-04-916087-1	January 20, 2026; 979-8-8554-2317-4
5	Sword Art Online: Re:Aincrad 5	July 10, 2025; 978-4-04-916482-4	April 27, 2027; 979-8-8554-3839-0
6	Sword Art Online: Re:Aincrad 6	April 10, 2026; 978-4-04-952194-8	—
7	Sword Art Online: Re:Aincrad 7	December 10, 2026; 978-4-04-952610-3	—

=== Sword Art Online: Unital Ring ===
No.	Title	Original release date	English release date
1	Sword Art Online: Unital Ring 1	November 25, 2023; 978-4-04-114248-6	July 8, 2025; 979-8-8554-0964-2
2	Sword Art Online: Unital Ring 2	May 24, 2024; 978-4-04-114891-4	January 27, 2026; 979-8-8554-1673-2
3	Sword Art Online: Unital Ring 3	April 25, 2025; 978-4-04-115958-3	August 25, 2026; 979-8-8554-3370-8
4	Sword Art Online: Unital Ring 4	January 23, 2026; 978-4-04-117027-4	—

=== Sword Art Online Alternative Gourmet Seekers ===
No.	Title	Japanese release date	Japanese ISBN
1	Sword Art Online Alternative Gourmet Seekers 1	March 10, 2025	978-4-04-916325-4
2	Sword Art Online Alternative Gourmet Seekers 2	September 27, 2025	978-4-04-916427-5

=== Unanswered//butterfly: Sword Art Online ===
No.	Title	Japanese release date	Japanese ISBN
1	Unanswered//butterfly: Sword Art Online	November 27, 2026	978-4-04-090054-4

== Reception ==
=== Sword Art Online: Girls' Ops ===
In his review of the first manga volume, Theron Martin of Anime News Network described the spin-off as a "generally satisfying expansion" that competently develops significant side characters and delves deeply into their psychological wounds. He noted that the battle scenes could be difficult to follow and the character designs lacked sharpness, concluding that while the volume is "unexceptional," it provides great value and remains a must-have for fans of the featured trio. Richard Eisenbeis of Kotaku was mixed-to-positive on the series; while praising the first volume's deep exploration of a survivor's severe PTSD, he found the second one to be "a bit of a letdown" due to its heavy focus on fanservice and comedy. He commended the character of Lux for providing real emotional weight and an incredibly satisfying resolution to the initial story arc. However, he also noted that the subsequent shift toward a light-hearted beach competition felt shallow, even though it still managed to develop the core relationships in meaningful ways.

Nic Willcox called the spin-off manga "fun" and "fascinating," noting that the protagonists "defy stereotypes" as passionate, skilled female gamers who care equally about beating monsters and "being emotionally supportive to their new friend." She stated that while the first volume features "pretty, detailed, and highly expressive" character art, it grounds its epic battles in a lot of "emotion and conversation" regarding the trauma of the past game, concluding that readers who enjoy "fantasy stories with heart" will devour this volume, including newcomers that will have "no trouble understanding this story." However, she gave the second and third volumes a mixed-to-positive review, observing that the sudden transition from a "wacky escapade" driven by a "gleefully over-the-top" swimsuit contest to a narrative full of "emotional scenes and flashbacks" creates a tonal shift "enough to give you whiplash." While praising the expressive, delicate artwork and the distinct "agency" given to the heroines, she emphasizes that the storyline between volumes one and three is heavily "interconnected" compared to the second book's fan-service-heavy detour, ultimately noting that any reader "uncomfortable with all the fanservice can skip volume two without missing any plot developments." Kim Morrissy called the spin-off "underrated" and "very compelling", noting that while the central trio is ironically "outshone even in their own spinoff" by an original character, the narrative expertly focuses on "making amends" and "character interactions." She states that the "seamless and natural" friendships and the creative exploration of the virtual setting sold them on the game mechanics better than the original series' main arcs, concluding that it serves as an excellent exploration of "what Sword Art Online is like without Kirito’s presence".
