= Sword Art Online =

Japanese light novel series and its adaptations

- First light novel volume cover, featuring Kirito (left) and Asuna (right)

ソードアート・オンライン (Sōdo Āto Onrain)
- Genre: Adventure; Science fiction
- Novel series
- Written by: Reki Kawahara (as Fumio Kunori)
- Published by: Self-published
- Original run: 2002 – 2008
- Light novel
- Written by: Reki Kawahara
- Illustrated by: abec
- Published by: ASCII Media Works
- English publisher: NA: Yen Press
- Imprint: Dengeki Bunko
- Original run: April 10, 2009 – present
- Volumes: 29
Further information
Light novel
Sword Art Online: Progressive
Written by	Reki Kawahara
Illustrated by	abec
Published by	ASCII Media Works
English publisher	NA: Yen Press
Imprint	Dengeki Bunko
Original run	October 10, 2012 – present
Volumes	10
Light novel
Sword Art Online Alternative: Clover's Regret
Written by	Soichiro Watase
Illustrated by	Ginta
Published by	ASCII Media Works
English publisher	NA: Yen Press
Imprint	Dengeki Bunko
Original run	November 10, 2016 – August 10, 2018
Volumes	3
Anime television series
Sword Art Online (2012–2020)
Other
Sword Art Online Alternative: Gun Gale Online (spin-off); Sword Art Online the Movie: Ordinal Scale (film); Sword Art Online Progressive: Aria of a Starless Night (film); Sword Art Online Progressive: Scherzo of Deep Night (film); Sword Art Online manga volumes; Sword Art Online video games
- icon

Sword Art Online (Japanese: ソードアート・オンライン, Hepburn: Sōdo Āto Onrain) is a Japanese light novel series written by Reki Kawahara and illustrated by abec. Originally released as a web novel on Kawahara's website from 2002 to 2008, the light novels began publication under ASCII Media Works' Dengeki Bunko imprint in April 2009, following them approving his request to publish it. The series takes place in the 2020s and focuses on protagonists Kazuto "Kirito" Kirigaya and Asuna Yuuki as they play through various VRMMORPG worlds, and later their involvement in the matters of a simulated civilization.

Multiple spin-offs have been released, including Sword Art Online Alternative: Gun Gale Online, Sword Art Online: Progressive, and Sword Art Online: Girls' Ops. Several adaptations into other media have been produced, including more than ten manga and an anime television series, which aired for three seasons from July 2012 to September 2020; a television film was released in December 2013. Anime film adaptations have been released in February 2017, October 2021, and October 2022. Several video game adaptations and board games have also been released.

Sword Art Online's themes include the dangers associated with virtual reality and allowing an external device to control a person's brain. The early volumes, as well as the anime, have received praise for the premise, world building, and the bond between Kirito and Asuna, while the pacing, writing, and treatment of female characters have been criticized; Kawahara has expressed regrets about the latter and critics felt that his writing improved in later volumes. The series has frequently ranked in Kono Light Novel ga Sugoi! and has 30 million copies in circulation, making it one of the best-selling light novels. It has also helped popularize web novels, VRMMORPG, and isekai fiction.

== Synopsis ==
=== Setting ===
The light novel series spans several virtual reality worlds, beginning with the game, Sword Art Online (SAO), which is set in a world known as Aincrad. Each world is built on a game engine called the Cardinal system, which was initially developed specifically for SAO by Akihiko Kayaba, but was later duplicated for Alfheim Online (ALO), and a consolidated package is later given to Kirito in the form of the World Seed, who had it leaked online with the successful intention of reviving the virtual reality industry. A third world known as Gun Gale Online (GGO) appears in the third arc and is stylized as a first-person shooter game instead of a role-playing game, and is the main setting of Alternative Gun Gale Online. It was created using the World Seed by an American company. A fourth world appears in the fourth arc known as the Underworld (UW). The world itself was created using the World Seed as a base, but it is as realistic as the real world due to using many powerful government resources to keep it running. A fifth main world called Unital Ring (UR) was formed under mysterious circumstances from the merging of all of the Seed MMO worlds, and is the main setting of the Unital Ring arc along with the Underworld.

=== Plot ===
In 2022, a virtual reality massively multiplayer online role-playing game (VRMMORPG) called Sword Art Online (SAO) was released. With the NerveGear, a helmet that stimulates the user's five senses via their brain, players can experience and control their in-game characters with their minds. Both the game and the NerveGear were created by Akihiko Kayaba. On November 6, 10,000 players log into SAO's mainframe cyberspace for the first time, only to discover that they are unable to log out. Kayaba appears and tells the players that they must beat all 100 floors of Aincrad, a steel castle which is the setting of SAO, if they wish to be free. He also states that those who suffer in-game deaths or forcibly remove the NerveGear out-of-game will suffer real-life deaths.

A player named Kazuto "Kirito" Kirigaya is one of 1,000 testers in the game's previous closed beta. With the advantage of previous VR gaming experience and a drive to protect other beta testers from discrimination, he isolates himself from the greater groups and plays the game alone, bearing the mantle of "beater", a portmanteau of "beta tester" and "cheater". As the players progress through the game Kirito eventually befriends a young woman named Asuna Yuuki, forming a relationship with and later marrying her in-game. After the duo discover the identity of Kayaba's secret ID, who was playing as "Heathcliff", the leader of the guild Asuna joined in, they confront and destroy him, freeing themselves and the other players from the game.

In the real world, Kazuto discovers that 300 SAO players, including Asuna, remain trapped in their NerveGear. As he goes to the hospital to see Asuna, he meets Asuna's father Shouzou Yuuki who is asked by an associate of his, Nobuyuki Sugou, to make a decision, which Sugou later reveals to be his marriage with Asuna, angering Kazuto. Several months later, he is informed by Agil, another SAO survivor, that a figure similar to Asuna was spotted on "The World Tree" in another VRMMORPG cyberspace called Alfheim Online (ALO). Assisted in-game by his cousin and adoptive sister Suguha "Leafa" Kirigaya and Yui, a navigation pixie (originally an AI from SAO), he quickly learns that the trapped players in ALO are part of a plan conceived by Sugou to perform illegal experiments on their minds. The goal is to create the perfect mind-control for financial gain and to subjugate Asuna, whom he intends to marry in the real world, to assume control of her family's corporation. Kirito eventually stops the experiment and rescues the remaining 300 SAO players, foiling Sugou's plans. Before leaving ALO to see Asuna, Kayaba, who has uploaded his mind to the Internet using an experimental, destructively high-powered version of NerveGear at the cost of his life, entrusts Kirito with The Seed—a package program designed to create virtual worlds. Kazuto eventually reunites with Asuna in the real world after thwarting an attack from Sugou and The Seed is released onto the Internet, reviving Aincrad as other VRMMORPGs begin to thrive.

One year after the events of SAO, at the prompting of a government official investigating strange occurrences in VR, Kazuto takes on a job to investigate a series of murders involving another VRMMORPG called Gun Gale Online (GGO), the AmuSphere (the successor of the NerveGear), and a player called Death Gun. Aided by a female player named Shino "Sinon" Asada, he participates in a gunfight tournament called the Bullet of Bullets (BoB) and discovers the truth behind the murders, which originated with a player who participated in a player-killing guild in SAO. Through his and Sinon's efforts, two suspects are captured, though the third suspect, Johnny Black, escapes.

Kazuto is later recruited to test an experimental FullDive machine, Soul Translator (STL), which has an interface far more realistic and complex than the previous machine he had played, to help RATH, a research and development organization under the Ministry of Defense (MOD), develop an artificial intelligence named A.L.I.C.E. He tests the STL by entering the Underworld (UW), a virtual reality cyberspace created with The Seed package. In the UW, the flow of time proceeds a thousand times faster than in the real world, and Kirito's memories of what happens inside are restricted. However, when Johnny Black ambushes and mortally wounds Kazuto with suxamethonium chloride, RATH recovers Kazuto and places him back into the STL to preserve his mind while attempts are made to save him. During his time in Underworld, Kirito befriends Eugeo, a carver in a small village of Rulid, and helps him on a journey to save Alice Zuberg, his friend who was taken by a group of highly skilled warriors known as the Integrity Knights for accidentally breaking a rule of the Axiom Church, the leaders of the Human Empire. He and Eugeo soon find themselves uncovering the secrets of the Axiom Church, led by a woman only known as "The Administrator", and the true purpose of Underworld itself, while unbeknownst to them, a war against the opposing Dark Territory is brewing on the horizon. They meet Alice, now an Integrity Knight, and though she does not remember them, Kirito helps her remember her true identity: a form of true artificial intelligence known as A.L.I.C.E. In the battle against the Administrator, Kirito manages to slay her, though Eugeo dies in the process, to Kirito's dismay.

Meanwhile, in the real world, conflict escalates as American forces raid RATH's facility in the Ocean Turtle in an effort to take A.L.I.C.E. for purposes unknown. Two of the attackers—Gabriel "Vecta" Miller and Vassago "Prince of Hell" Cassals—take control of two Dark Territory characters as they unite the Dark Territory's inhabitants to aid them. With help from all his friends, Kirito manages to stop the attackers as well as foreign players lured by Vassago, and safely extract A.L.I.C.E. from UW, who gains a physical body—with Gabriel and Vassago being killed both virtually and physically in the process. However, Kirito does not log out in time before the flow of time is restored and spends 200 years in UW (about 2 weeks in the real world) with Asuna, who stayed behind for Kirito. After awakening they have their memories of 200 years in underworld removed under Kirito's request, though RATH employee Takeru Higa secretly keeps a backup consciousness of his 200-year self, who have unknown plans for the Underworld.

One month later, Kirito, Asuna, and the others have their accounts forcibly migrated to Unital Ring, a new VRMMORPG which incorporates locations from all the other environments they previously visited, and investigate the cause while meeting some familiar faces.

== Production ==
Reki Kawahara wrote the first volume in 2001 as a competition entry for the 2002 ASCII Media Works Dengeki Game Novel Prize (電撃ゲーム小説大賞, Dengeki Game Shōsetsu Taishō; now Dengeki Novel Prize), but refrained from submitting it as he had exceeded the page limit; he instead published it as a web novel under the pseudonym Fumio Kunori. Over time, he added three further main arcs and several short stories which, like the first arc "Aincrad", were later adapted into the light novels. Kawahara originally released the novel on his website from 2002 to 2008. In 2008, he participated in the competition again by writing Accel World, this time winning the Grand Prize. Aside from Accel World, he was requested to get his earlier work, Sword Art Online, published by ASCII Media Works. He agreed and withdrew his web novel versions.

For the protagonist Kirito, Kawahara was asked if Kirito's personality and character were based on his own; he answered that he usually does not put aspects of himself into his characters, and jokingly remarked: "but if I had to say there was a point of similarity between Kirito and myself, it is the fact that neither of us are good at forming parties. We [both] tend to play solo in these games a lot." He also noted that the female characters in the story were not based on anyone he knew in the real world, stating: "I don't usually make a character, setting, or anything before I start writing. As I write the story, the girls become what they are now. So, somehow, I don't know exactly, but somehow, my subliminal idea or some hidden emotion creates the characters to be strong and capable." He added that he wrote the series to demonstrate that he views online gaming not as a social ill or escape from real life, but rather decided to show games in a more positive light in his light novels. Kawahara also noted that the character of Asuna might have been created a little too perfectly.

== Publication ==
After Kawahara's request for Sword Art Online to be published was approved, he started working with illustrator abec on the light novel series. The first volume was published in print on April 10, 2009, and 29 volumes have been published as of April 10, 2026. The first eight volumes of the light novel series told the story arcs for Sword Art Online, Alfheim Online, and Gun Gale Online. The Alicization story arc was covered by volumes 9 through 18, while volumes 19 and 20 told a side story called Moon Cradle. Kawahara plans on writing "one more big arc" called Unital Ring that will go back to the real world, and it is the first arc not based on the original web novel. The Unital Ring story arc began in volume 21, which was released in Japan on December 7, 2018.

Kawahara also writes the Sword Art Online: Progressive series, which covers Kirito's adventures on the first few floors of Aincrad. The first volume of Progressive was released on October 10, 2012, and ten volumes have been released as of November 10, 2026. The first volume of a light novel series based on Sword Art Online titled Sword Art Online Alternative: Gun Gale Online, written by Keiichi Sigsawa with illustrations by Kouhaku Kuroboshi, was published by ASCII Media Works on December 10, 2014. An original 100-page prequel novel to Sword Art Online the Movie: Ordinal Scale written by Kawahara, titled Hopeful Chant, was released to people who watched the film in Japan during March 4–10, 2017. Another spin-off novel, titled Sword Art Online Alternative Clover's Regret, written by Soichiro Watase, and illustrated by Ginta, was published in three volumes from November 10, 2016, to August 10, 2018.

At their Japan Expo USA panel, Yen Press announced the rights to publish the light novels; the first volume was released on April 22, 2014. Yen Press later announced their license of the Sword Art Online: Progressive series, which was released in 2015. Yen Press also published Sword Art Online Alternative Clover's Regret in English.

There are a number of doujinshi (fan works) written by Kawahara under the pseudonym Fumio Kunori, titled Sword Art Online Material Edition (ソードアート・オンライン・マテリアル・エディション). An 80-page assemblage of some of the Material Edition volumes was published on February 13, 2011; another, Material Edition: Remix, was published on September 6, 2019. The latest release is Material Edition volume 29 on May 12, 2019. The author has also created some other doujinshi, including Lisbeth Edition, Silica Edition and Pina Edition under cooperation with Kurusu Tatsuya from ponz.info. It has been reported that these doujinshi gained traction from the involvement of the original author in its creation process, as well as from supplying more details on characters from the original work.

== Media ==
=== Manga ===
In total, there are more than ten manga adaptations of the series, all written by Reki Kawahara and published by ASCII Media Works. Sword Art Online: Aincrad (ソードアート・オンライン アインクラッド), illustrated by Tamako Nakamura, was serialized in Dengeki Bunko Magazine between the September 2010 and May 2012 issues. Two tankōbon volumes of Aincrad were released on September 27, 2012. A comedy four-panel manga, titled Sword Art Online (そーどあーと☆おんらいん。) and illustrated by Jūsei Minami, began serialization in the September 2010 issue of Dengeki Bunko Magazine. The first volume of Sword Art Online was released on September 27, 2012. A third manga, titled Sword Art Online: Fairy Dance (ソードアート・オンライン フェアリィ・ダンス) and illustrated by Hazuki Tsubasa, began serialization in the May 2012 issue of Dengeki Bunko Magazine. The first volume of Fairy Dance was released on October 27, 2012; the third volume was released on June 27, 2014. The Aincrad and Fairy Dance manga have been acquired for release in North America by Yen Press. The first volume of Aincrad was published on March 25, 2014.

A spin-off manga starring Lisbeth, Silica, Leafa, and Lux, titled Sword Art Online: Girls Ops (ソードアート・オンライン ガールズ・オプス) and illustrated by Neko Nekobyō, began serialization in the July 2013 issue of Dengeki Bunko Magazine. Following the discontinuation of Dengeki Bunko Magazine in April 2020, the manga was moved to the DenPlay Comic website. Girls Ops was licensed by Yen Press in November 2014, the first volume of which was released on May 19, 2015. A manga adaptation of Sword Art Online: Progressive, illustrated by Kiseki Himura, began serialization in the August 2013 issue of Dengeki G's Magazine. The manga ended serialization in the magazine's May 2014 issue and was transferred to Dengeki G's Comic starting with the June 2014 issue. The Progressive manga adaptation has been licensed by Yen Press, with the first two volumes released in January and April 2015, respectively.

A sixth manga, titled Sword Art Online: Phantom Bullet and illustrated by Kōtarō Yamada, had its first chapter serialized in the May 2014 issue of Dengeki Bunko Magazine, with following chapters being digitally serialized on Kadokawa's ComicWalker website; it ran from 2014 to 2021. A seventh manga, titled Sword Art Online: Calibur and illustrated by Shii Kiya, was serialized in Dengeki G's Comic between the September 2014 and July 2015 issues. A single compilation volume was released on August 10, 2015. An eighth manga, titled Sword Art Online: Mother's Rosario and also by Tsubasa, is based on the seventh volume of the novel series and began serialization in the July 2014 issue of Dengeki Bunko Magazine. A ninth manga, an adaptation of Sword Art Online Alternative: Gun Gale Online, began serialization in the November 2015 issue of Dengeki Maoh.

A tenth manga, titled Sword Art Online: Project Alicization and illustrated by Kōtarō Yamada, based on the Alicization arc of the light novel series, began serialization in the September 2016 issue of Dengeki Bunko Magazine. It moved to Web DenPlay Comic due to the discontinuation of Dengeki Bunko Magazine, before ending in 2021. An eleventh manga, titled Sword Art Online Unital Ring and illustrated by Masato Kanetsuki, began serialization in Monthly Shōnen Ace on April 26, 2023.

=== Anime series ===
An anime adaptation of Sword Art Online was announced at Dengeki Bunko Autumn Festival 2011, along with Reki Kawahara's other light novel series, Accel World. The anime is produced by Aniplex and Genco, animated by A-1 Pictures and directed by Tomohiko Itō with music by Yuki Kajiura. The anime aired on Tokyo MX, tvk, TVS, TV Aichi, RKB, HBC, and MBS between July 7 and December 22, 2012, and on AT-X, Chiba TV, and BS11 at later dates. A year-end special, titled Sword Art Online: Extra Edition, aired on December 31, 2013. The special recapped the previously aired anime series and included some new footage. At the end of the special, the anime television series was confirmed for a second season, titled Sword Art Online II, which premiered on July 5, 2014. The third season of Sword Art Online, titled Sword Art Online: Alicization, and a spin-off anime, titled Sword Art Online Alternative: Gun Gale Online, were announced in 2017. Sword Art Online Alternative: Gun Gale Online, animated by 3Hz, premiered in April 2018. Sword Art Online: Alicization aired from October 6, 2018, to March 30, 2019. The season ended at episode 24 on March 30, 2019, and continued on October 12, 2019, with a second part titled War of Underworld. The second half of the War of Underworld series was originally scheduled to premiere in April 2020, but due to the effects of the COVID-19 pandemic in Japan, it was rescheduled to air from July 11 to September 19, 2020.

=== Films ===
An animated film titled Sword Art Online the Movie: Ordinal Scale, featuring an original story by Kawahara set after the events of Sword Art Online II, premiered in Japan and Southeast Asia on February 18, 2017, and was released in the United States on March 9, 2017.

After the finale of Sword Art Online: Alicization – War of Underworld, an anime adaptation of Sword Art Online: Progressive was announced. It was later revealed to be a new film titled Sword Art Online Progressive: Aria of a Starless Night, which premiered on October 30, 2021. Inori Minase is joining the cast as the new character Mito. Ayako Kōno is directing the film, with Kento Toya designing the characters, Yuki Kajiura returning to compose the music, and A-1 Pictures returning for production.

After the premiere of Sword Art Online Progressive: Aria of a Starless Night, a sequel film, titled Sword Art Online Progressive: Scherzo of Deep Night, was announced. The film was scheduled for September 10, 2022, but was later delayed due to production issues caused by the COVID-19 pandemic. It premiered on October 22, 2022.

In March, 2026, a 110-minute anime film, titled Unanswered//butterfly: Sword Art Online, was announced as a promotional tie-in to Game Studio's video game, Echoes of Aincrad, wih direction by Tadahiro "Tady" Yoshihira, screenplay by Yoshihara and Keisuke Makino, animation production by Polygon Pictures, and soundtrack by Kegani (毛蟹), Pan, and Iruma Rioka of Live Lab (LIVE LAB.株式会社). Its theme song, "Reach for the Rainbow", is performed by Iori (voiced by Reia Kato) and Lara (voiced by Rina), with lyrics, composition, and arrangement by a2c and TERRA of MintJam. The film's story follows two new players, Emirun and Rex, as they reunite inside SAO after its launch, learn how to survive in the death game, encounter Kirito, and train under Asuna after their party is wiped out. Tomoyo Kurosawa and Koki Uchiyama provide the voices for Emirun and Rex, respectively, while Yoshitsugu Matsuoka and Haruka Tomatsu reprise their voice roles as Kirito and Asuna, respectively. The film premiered during a promotional event in Japan on May 9 and was released on July 10, in select editions of the game. One critic, writing for Anime News Network, gave the film a mixed review, praising its "fantastic hook," the compelling mystery surrounding Kirito, 3DCG animation, "absolutely awesome" fight scenes, and the "stand-out character" of Rex, while heavily criticizing the co-lead character Emirun as "exhausting at best, annoying at worst" due to severe personality and visual design clashes that ultimately "undercut the story."

During the commemorative event "Sword Art Online: Full Dive", a new film project was announced. The project is described as an original work with stories not based on the light novels. The film was later revealed to be Sword Art Online the Movie: Integral Domain, an original theatrical film and a follow-up to the Alicization: War of Underworld arc. It was announced by Aniplex and is scheduled to premiere in 2028.

=== Video games ===
Sword Art Online video games have been published by various companies across multiple console generations and mobile devices. The games span multiple genres and form a distinct, alternative timeline from the novels. In particular, they often have original characters and incorporate events from the novels in different ways. The first Sword Art Online video game for consoles was Sword Art Online: Infinity Moment, which was released in Japan on March 14, 2013, for the PlayStation Portable. The first game released outside of Japan was Sword Art Online: Hollow Fragment, which was released in the West in 2014, for the PlayStation Vita. By March 2026, the Sword Art Online console games have cumulatively sold over 10 million units worldwide.

=== Board games ===
A cooperative card game based on Sword Art Online, titled Sword Art Online: Aincrad Strategy Guide, was released in Japan in June 2013. Sword Art Online: Sword of Fellows, a board game based on the light novel, was released in Japan on June 29, 2017. The game was designed by Seiji Kanai and follows Kirito and Asuna as they try to escape Aincrad. A board game adaptation of the video game Sword Art Online: Code Register, titled Sword Art Online: Scout Battle, was designed by Kanai and released in Japan on October 7, 2017. A karuta Sword Art Online game was released by Bushiroad on October 30, 2021. Several Sword Art Online-themed expansions have been released for the card game Weiß Schwarz since 2013.

=== Live-action series ===
On August 2, 2016, Skydance Television announced that they had acquired the global rights to produce a live-action television adaptation of the series. Laeta Kalogridis has been attached to write a script for the pilot, and will also serve as executive producer for the series alongside Skydance CEO David Ellison, Dana Goldberg, and Marcy Ross. Skydance has stated their intent to "fast-track" the launch of the series, along with plans to follow the TV series with the release of a Sword Art Online virtual reality experience. In February 2018, it was reported that the live-action series had been sold to Netflix.

== Themes ==
One of the most prominent themes in Sword Art Online is the boundary between cyberspace and the body, as well as showing virtual reality and video games as both a refuge and a trap. In particular, it spotlights the dangers associated with allowing an external device to control a person's brain while giving players no control over their body while playing. Its storylines also feature corporate conspiracies and government research projects seeking to exploit these advancements in technology. The Alicization story arc also discusses the Turing test and the moral standing of simulated individuals.

The characters in Sword Art Online are more archetypal in nature, which is unusual for Japanese works. For example, Kirito is a young adult obsessed with gaming culture at the detriment to his social skills, which is a common stereotype of otaku. This allows otaku readers to feel more connected to Kirito. Sword Art Online's characters have been described as an example of database consumption, with each character being adaptable across different media. This also allows the series to continue to expand despite minimal new content, as previous assets from other media can be efficiently reworked.

The female characters in Sword Art Online are threatened with, or subjected to, rape, disfigurement, or other tortures by the villains. In particular, critics felt that Asuna was reduced to a damsel in distress during the first story arc, which was strongly criticized. In a 2013 interview, Kawahara said that he regretted his treatment of Asuna and that he wrote the "Mother's Rosario" story as recompense. In 2018, Kawahara apologized to Kaori Ishihara and Reina Kondō, who voiced characters in the anime adaptation that were sexually assaulted. In a 2019 interview, Kawahara stated that female characters are not trophies and expressed a desire to give the female characters in Sword Art Online more agency and prominence in the story.

== Reception ==
=== Popularity ===
According to Oricon, Sword Art Online was the top selling light novel series of 2012, with eight volumes figuring among the top selling light novels. It was also the second best selling light novel series in the first half of 2016 in Japan, selling 489,374 copies. Sword Art Online: Progressive sold 321,535 copies in the same time period. By 2017, the series has an estimated 20 million copies in print worldwide. By 2021, the series had 26 million copies in print. By 2024, the series had 30 million copies in circulation.

It was ranked first in the 2012 and 2013 Kono Light Novel ga Sugoi! rankings, as well as top five placement in 2011, 2014, 2015, 2016, 2017, 2018 and top 10 in 2019. In the 2020 edition of Kono Light Novel ga Sugoi!, Sword Art Online was voted by the public in an online poll and by a jury (critics, influencers, and other people related to the light novel industry) as the best light novel series of the 2010s, being the first in the ranking with 1,728.95 points. In the same book, the series was inducted into the hall of fame, thus barring from ranking in future years.

=== Critical response ===
The premise and world building received positive reviews, with critics describing it as understandable to a wide range of readers. Andy Hanley of UK Anime Network described the world building as "exquisite" and felt that Kawahara's setting of Aincrad was well thought out. However, the writing has received criticism, with the pacing and repeated use of deus ex machina resolutions being a common complaint. Matthew Warner of The Fandom Post felt that the story was "elevating far too fast" and needed more time to develop.

The focus on the emotional impact on the characters has been well received. However, the character development has received some criticism, with Martin stating that the attempt to make Kirito more emotional "commonly fall flat" and Warner feeling that Kirito's development feels "artificial". The romantic bond between Kirito and Asuna has received praise. Hanley wrote that their relationship "fits with that world reasonably well" and Sean Gaffney liked that Asuna was open and comfortable with her feelings. Critics also felt that their romance was rushed, with Martin stating that the novel does a "thin job of developing the romance". Other criticism was directed at Kawahara's handling of the female characters. Warner described the main villain, Akihiko Kayaba as "oddly detached" and felt that their motives "never quite seem to come together".

While the early volumes received criticism, the later light novel arcs, such as Alicization, received praise, with Piotr Konieczny of The Encyclopedia of Science Fiction feeling that Kawahara's writing had improved. Martin praised many of the volumes of the Alicization arc, stating that the author's writing had improved greatly over time.

=== Removals ===
On June 12, 2015, the now-inactive Chinese Ministry of Culture listed Sword Art Online II among 38 anime and manga titles banned in China. In July 2020, Sword Art Online became one of seven manga titles to be removed from Books Kinokuniya in Australia following a written complaint by politician Connie Bonaros that they violate Australia's child pornography laws. Following the complaint, the books were required to be classified by the Australian Classification Board and could not be sold until then.

== Cultural impact ==
It was a time when fanfiction was more prevalent than original novels. So when Reki Kawahara won the Dengeki Novel Prize with Accel World, which also led to his self-published original web novel [Sword Art Online] getting published, he proved that there was a pathway beyond novel contests and commercial publishing. As much as I thought that it was due to his own skill, it also made me think that if I did my best, my words could reach others too.

— Kuji Furumiya, author of Unnamed Memory

The success of Sword Art Online led to an increase in popularity for web novels in Japan among both writers and readers, which has led to the growth of novel posting websites like Shōsetsuka ni Narō. The increasing popularity of web novels caused by Sword Art Online helped popularize numerous other titles, including Maoyu and Log Horizon by Mamare Touno, The Irregular at Magic High School by Tsutomu Satō, and Mushoku Tensei by Rifujin na Magonote.

Alongside Ready Player One, Sword Art Online has been identified as one of the most influential fictional depictions of VRMMORPGs during the 2010s virtual reality revival and has been described as one of the defining franchises associated with fictional VRMMORPG settings. Sword Art Online is also credited with coining the terms "VRMMORPG" and "full dive" to describe a fully immersive VR experience. Oculus VR founder Palmer Luckey is a fan of Sword Art Online and has cited it as an important inspiration for his work. In particular, he has expressed a desire to develop a NerveGear-like device.

Sword Art Online has helped popularize the isekai genre and its story contains several tropes found in the genre. Some consider it to be a "modern pioneer" of the genre, though Kawahara disagrees. Sword Art Online also helped to popularize the term isekai outside of Japan.
