= List of Sword Art Online characters =

The following is a list of characters from the light novel, anime and manga series Sword Art Online. Most of the characters are introduced as gamers who play and consequently become trapped in a virtual reality massively multiplayer online role-playing game (VRMMORPG) Sword Art Online. The series chronicles their interactions in multiple online worlds: Sword Art Online (SAO), Alfheim Online (ALO), Gun Gale Online (GGO), and Underworld (UW).

Sword Art Online has an extensive cast of fictional characters. The series focuses Kazuto Kirigaya as he attempts to clear and explore the virtual world of Aincrad in the VR game, Sword Art Online. He is accompanied by Asuna Yuuki, and they work together and support each other as the series progresses.

== Main characters ==
=== Kirito ===
Kirito (キリト) / Kazuto Kirigaya (桐ヶ谷 和人, Kirigaya Kazuto) / Kazuto Narusaka (鳴坂 和人, Narusaka Kazuto) (birth name)

Voiced by: Yoshitsugu Matsuoka (Japanese); Bryce Papenbrook (English)

As the main protagonist of Sword Art Online, Kirito was chosen to be one of the one thousand beta testers for the closed beta of Sword Art Online, the first ever Virtual Reality Massively Multiplayer Online Role-Playing Game (VRMMORPG) for the NerveGear, and later joined the official version of the game where he became one of the 10,000 players trapped in SAO. At some point in the game, he became known as the Black Swordsman (黒の剣士, Kuro no Kenshi) due to his tendency to wear black clothing.

=== Asuna ===
Asuna (アスナ) / Asuna Yuuki (結城 明日奈, Yūki Asuna)

Voiced by: Haruka Tomatsu (Japanese); Cherami Leigh (English)

The main heroine of Sword Art Online and main protagonist of Mother's Rosario and the Progressive series (which tells the entire Aincrad arc through her perspective), Asuna – who is 17 (born: 30 September 2007) – is a friend and later to be girlfriend and the in-game wife of Kirito in Sword Art Online and ALfheim Online. In SAO, her skills with the rapier had her earn the nickname The Flash (閃光, Senkō). In ALO, she had earned the nickname Berserk Healer (バーサクヒーラー, Bāsaku Hīrā) due to her tendency to charge into battle with a rapier despite being a healer.

== Major characters ==
=== Yui ===
Yui (ユイ)
Voiced by: Kanae Itō (Japanese); Stephanie Sheh (English)

Originally a side-story character in SAO, Yui later becomes an accompanying/support character in ALO. At first thought to be a lost child in SAO, she is an artificial intelligence. Her full designation is «Mental Health – Counselling Program», MHCP version 1, codename, «Yui». Yui is shown to have a human form and a Navigation Pixie form where she is always barefoot in both forms. She was designed to monitor the emotions of players and appear at their sides to hear and help them out. However, since the moment everyone was imprisoned in Sword Art Online, she was forbidden to come in contact with the players and complete her prime directive. Unable to do anything but suffer as she monitored the emotions of the trapped players, she came upon Kirito and Asuna whose emotions stood out as a beacon of joy and peace in a sea of fear and despair. She sought them out, appearing to them as an amnesiac child whom they adopted. In the end she was nearly deleted by Cardinal, the management system of SAO, but is saved by Kirito by converting and storing her data into his own NerveGear. Yui later shows up in ALO as a Private Navigation Pixie and helps Kirito along with Leafa to find Asuna. She refers to Kirito as "Daddy" and Asuna as "Mommy" and gets very annoyed if any other girls try to flirt with Kirito, she also asserts Kirito not to keep any secrets from Asuna. Kirito uses his skills and resources in the real world to construct a device for Yui to view the real world even while she is in virtual reality and gives her the ability to communicate with them.

=== Leafa ===
Leafa (リーファ, Rīfa) / Suguha Kirigaya (桐ヶ谷 直葉, Kirigaya Suguha)
Voiced by: Ayana Taketatsu (Japanese); Cassandra Lee Morris (English)

Suguha, also known as Sugu; she is in actuality Kazuto's cousin, as her mother had been raising her sister's child from a young age after his parents died from an accident, though neither Suguha nor Kazuto knew about this until later. She is a diligent worker and has been practicing kendo for eight years, partially to escape the loneliness and isolation in her life. After Kazuto Kirigaya (the name of Kirito in real life) gets trapped in Sword Art Online, she begins playing Alfheim Online as a Sylph in an attempt to try to understand him better, and it is at this time that she finds out they are cousins rather than siblings; with her mother revealing to her that he is not her biological brother, but is actually her cousin and was adopted into their family when he was young. This causes Sugu to develop feelings for him that she doesn't really understand; however, because he is trapped inside SAO, she never acts on them. That being said, when Kazuto awakens after his two-year ordeal, those feelings come back, but she realizes that he is already in love with someone else, namely Asuna.

Coincidentally, she meets Kazuto's avatar, Kirito, in Alfheim Online after he saves her from an attack by player killers. Unaware of his true identity, she decides to help him on his quest to find somebody which eventually leads them to the world tree. After understanding the depth of Kazuto's love for Asuna, she resolves to give up on him and instead becomes attached to Kirito in ALO. However, when Kirito's true identity is revealed, she is heartbroken and the two of them have an awkward exchange in the real world where Sugu reveals her feelings for him. Not knowing how to respond or comfort her, Kazuto tells her he will be waiting for her in game. When they meet up they engage in a fight which culminates with both of them letting down their guard expecting the other one to kill them, however that only leads to them hugging and apologizing to each other. Leafa lets go of her feelings for Kirito and after pulling herself together she helps him rescue Asuna from the top of the world tree. She regularly plays ALO together with Kirito, Asuna, Silica, Klein and the rest of their group. Leafa, Lisbeth and Silica also feature as protagonists in the spin-off manga series Sword Art Online: Girls' Ops, where they form a team with Kirito away on a study program and Asuna tied up in family affairs.

==== Critical commentary ====
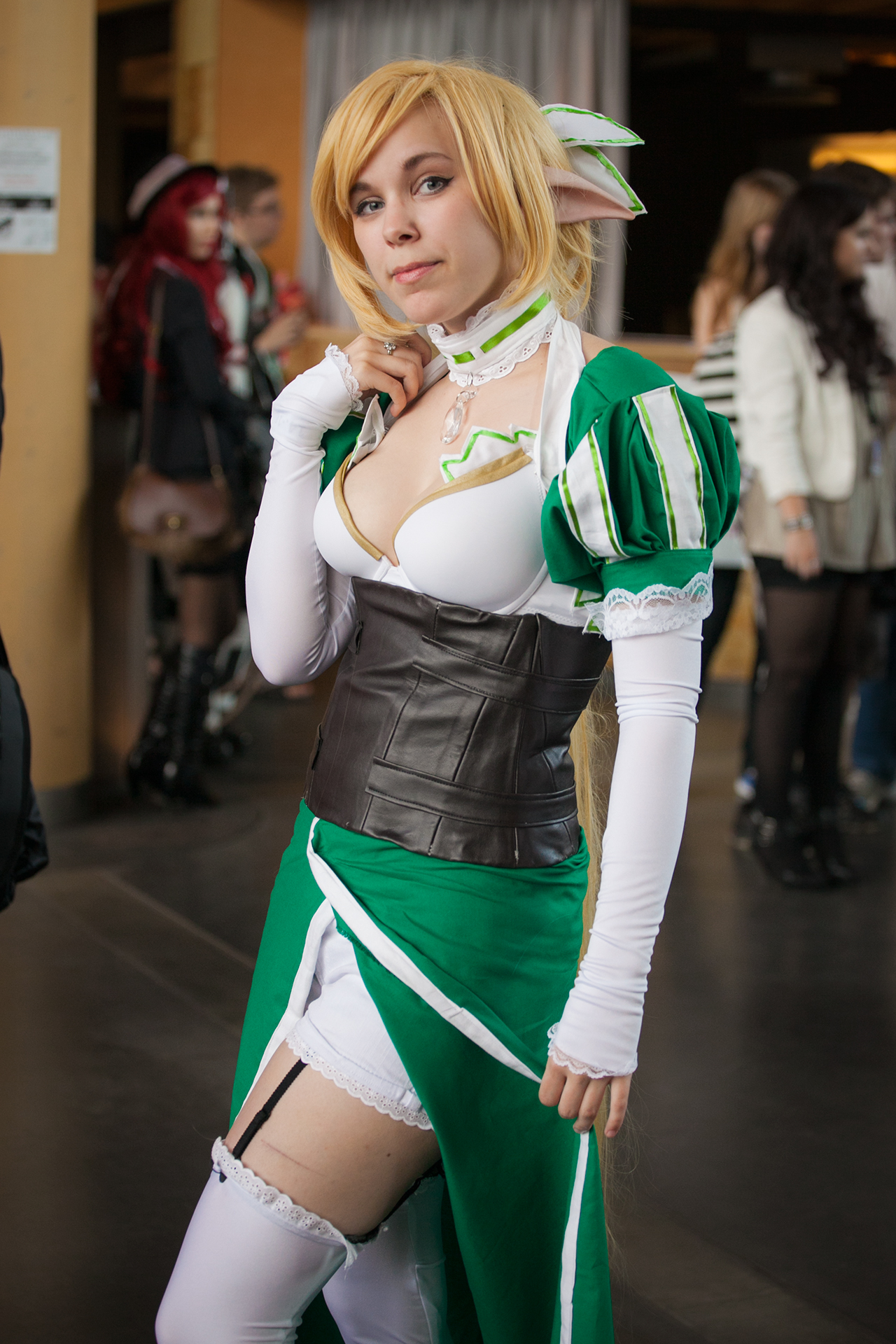
Leafa is also a frequent subject of cosplay.

Leafa has received generally positive critical reception. Karen Mead of Japanator.com critiqued Suguha's character as "a fairly nuanced, sympathetic portrayal of someone falling in love with a blood relation due to an unfortunate set of circumstances, which is entirely different from the 'I love you, Oni-chan!', fetishism that we see all too often in anime ... We get to know Suguha entirely too well for that", thus debunking criticism of "Suguha falling for Kirito [being] toxic, awful siscon crap". Noting that the focus shifts away from Asuna towards Leafa in the Fairy Dance arc, Anime News Network's Theron Martin wrote in a review that "Suguha's unrequited love seems more like a play meant to pander to 'Big Brother Complex' fans, though she does get some nice emotional development out of it and some very good scenes later on when the matter of her attempt to replace her misplaced love for Kazuto Kirigaya with Leafa's attraction to Kirito (who is also unknowingly her brother) blows up". Reviewing the spin-off manga series Sword Art Online: Girls Ops, Martin praised it for Leafa's prominence in the storyline, and "while Suguha was a veritable co-lead for one story arc, she has now been relegated to that role in the franchise, too".

Rebecca Silverman, also of Anime News Network, referred to Leafa as a "somewhat more interesting character" than Kirito, despite her crush on him being "annoying". She referred to her having "promise as a character" as one of the positive aspects of the third Fairy Dance light novel. Silverman, in a review of episode 15 – 25 in the Sword Art Online anime, went on to say that "Leafa shows more emotional strength as a heroine than Asuna ever did", and she "also stand[s] out as one of the more interesting, developed characters", due to not being overly reliant on Kirito. Silverman also found Kirito and Leafa's relationship to have developed more naturally than Kirito and Asuna's. In his Sword Art Online: Girls' Ops review, Theron Martin also wrote that "That the first such [Sword Art Online spin-off] manga would feature Silica, Lisbeth, and Leafa is ... no surprise, as fans have clamored for the former two in particular to get more attention ever since they were first introduced".

=== Sinon ===
Sinon (シノン, Shinon) / Shino Asada (朝田 詩乃, Asada Shino)
Voiced by: Miyuki Sawashiro (Japanese); Michelle Ruff (English)

Sinon is the main character of the Phantom Bullet Arc. When she was two years old, her father died in a car accident. Nine years later, while at a post office, an armed robber attempted to shoot a pregnant woman, but lost control of the gun after Shino bit his hand. Afterwards, she shot him three times, killing him. Since that event, she developed a fear of guns, entering panic attacks whenever one is visible. As a result, she is bullied at school by her peers, with a finger gun being enough to trigger her phobia. To help ease her trauma, her friend Kyōji Shinkawa convinced her to play Gun Gale Online. Known as Sinon in-game, her main weapon is the «PGM Ultima Ratio Hecate II» sniper rifle, which she earned after defeating a monster in a dungeon.

Shortly before the Bullet of Bullets (BoB) tournament, Sinon encounters Kirito, deciding to help him after believing he is female due to his avatar. After Kirito's true gender was revealed, an embarrassed Sinon attempts to leave him, but they meet again during the BoB. The two are confronted by Death Gun, who causes Sinon's PTSD to relapse when his weapon was revealed to be a Type 54 pistol, the same weapon she had used in the post office shooting. She is rescued by Kirito and the two escape, though she is afraid to attack Death Gun. With his help, Sinon overcomes her fear and the two defeat Death Gun. Afterwards, the two end the tournament as co-winners after Sinon kills them both with a «Gift Grenade». Upon exiting GGO, Shino is visited by Kyōji, who congratulates her on winning the BoB. However, angry at Kirito, he attacks her with intentions of raping and eventually killing her, revealing himself to be Death Gun's creator. Shino manages to resist his attack and escape, but is stopped by Kyōji before she could exit the house; Kirito arrives and fights Kyōji, the latter eventually being knocked out by Shino throwing her stereo at him.

After the Death Gun incident, Sinon seems to have gotten over her fear and is moving on from the incident, no longer vulnerable to her classmates' threats of using a gun on her. In Agil's café, Shino meets Asuna, Rika, and Sachie Oosawa, a woman who had survived the post office incident, who convinces her that she had saved her and her daughter's life. Sinon eventually decides to play ALfheim Online with Kirito and his friends.

=== Yuuki ===
Yuuki (ユウキ, Yūki) / Yuuki Konno (紺野 木綿季, Konno Yūki)
Voiced by: Aoi Yūki (Japanese); Erica Mendez (English)

One of the main characters from Volume 7. She was an Imp in ALO, she started dueling anyone promising an 11-hit Original Sword Skill (OSS) if she's defeated: due to her undefeated status she's given the title "Absolute Sword". Eventually Asuna fights her but loses. After the fight Yuuki asks her to help defeating the 27th Floor boss with her guild the "Sleeping Knights" in desire to etch all their names on the Monument of Swordsmen to make a memory. After certain events, which include the defeat of the boss it is revealed that Yuuki has HIV/AIDS and the guild members are patients in terminal state: to test the Medicuboid device, designed supposedly by Rinko Koujiro, in care for future patients. Yuuki forms a strong bond with Asuna, in reminder of her late elder twin sister Aiko Konno. With the time passing Yuuki's condition deteriorates and after she entrusts her OSS «Mother's Rosario» to Asuna before she dies peacefully in ALO, surrounded by over 1000 players from every tribe in the game, including her guild members, Asuna and her friends.

Sword Art Online girls (including Yuuki) feature in a merchandise lottery by Bandai, where they are depicted in french maid clothing with cooking utensils, with Anime News Network humorously noting that they have "brought in a pretty penny for the franchise's creators." She also features in promotional advertisements for a series of Umaibo puffed corn snacks by Namco. Richard Eisenbeis of Kotaku complimented Yuuki as a "powerfully human" character, writing "Like with the classic Beowulf, Yuuki finds her meaning and immortality in the written word. For her, having her name (and those of her soon-to-pass-away friends) on a virtual wall for all eternity is proof that she existed. To her, even that is enough."

Yuuki was awarded fifth in a Dengeki Bunko character poll for their light novels.

=== Eugeo ===
Eugeo (ユージオ, Yūjio)
Voiced by: Nobunaga Shimazaki (Japanese); Brandon Winckler (English)

A young lad who was also Kirito's "childhood friend" along with Alice in Underworld. He has his memories of Kirito purged, along with the rest of his fellow villagers, but recovers them later on, to a certain degree. He has a strong desire to find Alice after she was taken away by the Axiom Church, and in order to do so, Kirito teaches him his "Aincrad-style" sword skills, taking the "Blue Rose Sword" as his primary weapon. Eugeo became Kirito's best friend and most loyal companion throughout his time in Underworld. Later, he breaks the Taboo Index to save his disciples who are almost raped by nobles who had a grudge towards him and Kirito, becoming the first AI fluclight to successfully break the "Seal of the Right Eye". As a result of their "crime", Eugeo and Kirito come into conflict with the Integrity Knights of the Church as they fight to save Alice and free the Human Empire from the tyranny of Quinella. After coming to a stalemate duel with Bercouli Synthesis One, Eugeo is captured by Quinella and turned into an Integrity Knight, becoming Eugeo Synthesis Thirty-Two (ユージオ・シンセシス・サーティツー, Yūjio Shinseshisu Sātitsū). Eugeo broke free from Quinella's control, but he was bisected after dealing a critical blow to her and dies in front of a devastated Kirito. Eugeo tags alongside a young Alice to the afterlife. Amid the struggle with PoH in the Alicization – War of Underworld-arc, Eugeo's spirit helps to restore a catatonic Kirito to full health, and continues to support him in his battles against PoH and Gabriel Miller.

Eugeo was awarded sixth in a Dengeki Bunko character poll for their light novels.

=== Alice ===
Alice Zuberg (アリス・ツーベルク, Arisu Tsūberuku)
Voiced by: Ai Kayano (Japanese); Kayli Mills (English)

The mysterious girl who was Kirito's "childhood friend", along with Eugeo, in Underworld. She is captured and supposedly taken away to be executed by the Integrity Knights for breaking the law by "entering" the Dark Territory. Years later Alice contacted Kirito, in spirit form, as well as aided in Eugeo's healing, showing that she is still alive and remembered both of them. She also implored them to come and find her. It is later revealed that she had become an Integrity Knight in Volume 11 of the light novels. Her name as an Integrity Knight is Alice Synthesis Thirty (アリス・シンセシス・サーティ, Arisu Shinseshisu Sāti). Having lost her childhood memories due to the Synthesis Ritual, Alice is initially cold and hostile towards Kirito and Eugeo. After Kirito reveals the truth about her former identity and the corruption behind Administrator's rule, Alice chooses to join Kirito and Eugeo in their battle to defeat Quinella. Though they are successful in killing Quinella, Eugeo lost his life and Kirito was left comatose. Worried for Kirito's safety after having bonded with him, Alice takes him with her to Rulid Village where she is reunited with her little sister Selka.

Setting up residence in a small house on the village outskirts, Alice cares for the catatonic Kirito and grows highly protective of him. Inspired by Kirito trying to save her village's people despite his crippled state, Alice later participates in the war against the Dark Territory. She gets kidnapped by Gabriel Miller, but is rescued through the efforts of Bercouli, Sinon, Kirito and Asuna. She is then sent to the real world and taken into the protective custody of Rinko Koujiro. She is given an android body created in her likeness, and officially revealed to the world as the first Bottom-Up AI in a press conference organized by Rath.

Alice was awarded fourth in a Dengeki Bunko character poll for their light novels.

=== Mito ===
Mito (ミト) / Misumi Tozawa (兎沢 深澄, Tozawa Misumi)
Voiced by: Inori Minase, Ryūsei Nakao (Beta Avatar) (Japanese); Anairis Quiñones, Kayleigh McKee (Beta Avatar) (English)

An anime original character for the Progressive movies, Misumi is Asuna's classmate in middle school who consistently ranks number 1 in her school examinations. Although she looks like an impenetrable beauty and honors student to most students, she and Asuna regularly play video games after school on the roof after Asuna discovers that Misumi is secretly a hardcore gamer who participates in local tournaments. Misumi was a beta tester for Sword Art Online and goes by the name Mito in the game, and is the one who encourages Asuna to log in to SAO on the day of release so that they can play together. After the SAO players are trapped in the game by Kayaba, Mito and Asuna travel and train together in order to get stronger and eventually clear the first floor. However, due to an accidental encounter with a horde of pitcher plant monsters, Mito is forced to abandon Asuna in order to save herself, an act which she felt extremely guilty of. She later joins a party which takes part in the boss fight on the first floor and realizes during the fight that Asuna is also there and that she isn't dead. As Mito struggles to apologize to Asuna, Asuna reassures her that she wasn't wrong to do what she did after a pep talk by Kirito, and they join the fight with Kirito to defeat the first boss. When Asuna decides to follow Kirito up to the second floor, Mito bids her farewell and leaves with the other surviving participants of the boss battle. Her appearance in the main story becomes official after her return in the Unital Ring arc to help Asuna in the Unital Ring case while revealing she survived SAO during the events they went separate ways. Her original avatar in SAO resembles an old dwarf.

== Supporting characters ==
=== SAO players ===
==== Klein ====
Klein (クライン, Kurain) / Ryōtarō Tsuboi (壷井 遼太郎, Tsuboi Ryōtarō)
Voiced by: Hiroaki Hirata (Japanese); Kirk Thornton (English)

A friendly player that meets Kirito at the start of the game, who quickly befriends and learns the basics from Kirito where he became one of the 10,000 players who were trapped in Sword Art Online. Kirito and Klein go their separate ways shortly after when Kirito leaves for another town to power level, while Klein remains behind to help out his less experienced friends, although he is concerned for Kirito due to his solitude and recklessness. Klein uses a katana to fight and later becomes a leader of his own guild, Fuurinkazan. He regularly meets with Kirito and his friends and occasionally joins them in quests in ALO, especially after the release of the World Seed.

In an interview with Sword Art Online author Reki Kawahara, he noted that Agil and Klein are both "very popular", and he wanted to write short stories centred around their characters.

==== Agil ====
Agil (エギル, Egiru) / Andrew Gilbert Mills (アンドリュー・ギルバート・ミルズ, Andoryū Girubāto Miruzu)
Voiced by: Hiroki Yasumoto (Japanese); Patrick Seitz (English)

A bald, African Japanese axe wielder who owns a general shop in SAO, along with having a hand in Blacksmithing. Despite his intimidating appearance, he is kind-hearted and spent most of his earnings to help players in the middle floors. Kirito is a regular in his shop and they are friends. Agil runs a bar named "Dicey Café" in the real world, which was run by his wife during his two-year coma. The café later becomes Kazuto and company's meeting place in the real world.

In an interview with Sword Art Online author Reki Kawahara, he noted that Agil and Klein are both "very popular", and he wanted to write short stories centred around their characters.

==== Silica ====
Silica (シリカ, Shirika) / Keiko Ayano (綾野 珪子, Ayano Keiko)
Voiced by: Rina Hidaka (Japanese); Christine Marie Cabanos (English)

A side-story character in SAO. One of the rare beast tamers in the game. Very early in the game, she was able to tame a small dragon named Pina (ピナ), who is named after her real-life cat: this feat gave her immense fame, but she was just a mid-level player. Due to her fame, many tried to get on her good side, causing her to get a bit of an inflated head. She usually stays away from the males, who try to marry her (despite the fact that she's only 13) or make her their "mascot." After getting lost in a forest, Pina is killed trying to save Silica from a monster attack. Kirito rescued and helped Silica get the "Pneuma Flower", an item that can revive tamed beasts, as she resembled his sister. She gained feelings for him, but once she discovers his skills, she realized that they cannot be together in the game but promise to meet again. Keiko befriends Rika at SAO Survivor School. She joins Kirito and his friends in ALO right after they meet in the real world: they often go together in quests.

Sword Art Online girls (including Silica) feature in a merchandise lottery by Bandai, where they are depicted in french maid clothing with cooking utensils, with Anime News Network (ANN) humorously noting that they have "brought in a pretty penny for the franchise's creators." In an interview with Haruka Tomatsu, Asuna's voice actress, she nominated Silica as her favourite character as she is "the kind of character I would want to have as a little sister."

Silica was awarded 18th in a Dengeki Bunko character poll for their light novels.

==== Lisbeth ====
Lisbeth (リズベット, Rizubetto) / Rika Shinozaki (篠崎 里香, Shinozaki Rika)
Voiced by: Ayahi Takagaki (Japanese); Sarah Anne Williams (English)

A side-story character in SAO, who is a blacksmith with her own shop and takes great pride in her abilities. Lisbeth or "Liz" is a close friend of Asuna who recommended her to Kirito. Kirito commissioned Liz to forge a custom-made sword for him and accompanies her in a quest for the special ore required for the job. During the quest, she also develops feelings for Kirito. She is devastated when she finds out that Kirito is Asuna's crush. However, she finds some solace after Kirito thanks her for giving him a renewed determination to fight on and clear the game. She requests to be Kirito's exclusive blacksmith. Rika is almost very well teasing Asuna about her relationship with Kirito afterwards. At SAO Survivor School, she and Keiko get irritated when seeing Kazuto and Asuna together. Liz later becomes a regular player in ALO and frequently joins Kirito and his friends in quests and takes up the task of upgrading their equipment.

Sword Art Online girls (including Lisbeth) feature in a merchandise lottery by Bandai, where they are depicted in french maid clothing with cooking utensils, with Anime News Network humorously noting that they have "brought in a pretty penny for the franchise's creators." Yoshitsugu Matsuoka, the Japanese voice talent for Kirito, mentioned Lisbeth as his favourite character, since "Liz is really straight-forward and focused inside of the world of Sword Art Online, but then there was that scene when she learned that her best friend Asuna was in love with Kirito... Maybe it was [Ayahi] Takagaki's acting, but when I heard that her lines during that scene, I was like, wow."

==== Sachi ====
Sachi (サチ)
Voiced by: Saori Hayami (Japanese); Xanthe Huynh (English)

A side story character in SAO and a member of the "Moonlit Black Cats," which was the first guild Kirito joined. Kirito was especially attached to her. She, along with the other members, were in a computer club at their school in the real world. However, she was killed along with the majority of her guild members in a trapped room on the 27th Floor with high-level mobs which led to Kirito wallowing in despair and self-loathing until he read the time delayed message she left for him on Christmas Eve. Even after the message gave him the strength to live, he never joined another guild until he is forced to join the Knights of the Blood Oath.

==== Argo ====
Argo (アルゴ, Arugo) / Tomo Carina Hosaka (帆坂朋, Hosaka Karīna Tomo)
Voiced by: Shiori Izawa (Japanese); Cassandra Lee Morris (Aincrad Arc), Kimberley Anne Campbell (English)

Argo is an information broker in SAO who worked alongside Kirito. During her time in SAO, she worked as a middle man for certain trades and exchanged information with Kirito; where eventually she earned the nickname Argo The Rat (鼠のアルゴ, Nezumi no Arugo) after the whiskers she wore on her face and the sly tactics she would use to earn Col.

==== Sasha ====
Sasha (サーシャ, Sāsha)
Voiced by: Kyouko Fujii (Japanese); Erika Harlacher (English)

Sasha is a caretaker of the younger SAO players in Town of Beginnings on the 1st Floor.

==== Thinker ====
Thinker (シンカー, Shinkā)
Voiced by: Takahiro Mizushima (Japanese); Victor Sgroi (English)

Thinker is the leader of the Liberation Force Army. He later marries his second-in-command Yulier in real life.

==== Yolko ====
Yolko (ヨルコ, Yoruko)
Voiced by: Nozomi Yamamoto (Japanese); Natalie Hoover (English)

Yolko is a member of the Golden Apple guild. Her boyfriend is Caynz.

==== Caynz ====
Caynz (ヨルコ, Kainzu)
Voiced by: (Japanese); Kyle Herbert (English)

Caynz is a member of the Golden Apple guild. His girlfriend is Yolko.

==== Yulier ====
Yulier (ユリエール, Yuriēru)
Voiced by: Ryoko Shiraishi (Japanese); Amanda C. Miller (English)

Yulier is second-in-command of the Liberation Force Army. She is devoted to aiding Thinker with his duties as leader. Thinker married her in real life.

==== Kizmel ====
Kizmel (キズメル, Kizumeru)
Voiced by: Shizuka Itō

She is a Dark Elven Royal Guard, a member of the Dark Elven Pagoda Knight, and an elite quest Non-Player Character (NPC) for the Elf War campaign, who partied with Kirito and Asuna throughout the campaign.

==== Kibaou ====
Kibaou (キバオウ, Kibaou)
Voiced by: Tomokazu Seki (Japanese); Derek Stephen Prince (English)

The former leader of the "Aincrad Liberation Squad" and later a sub-leader of the "Aincrad Liberation Force," he is a solidly built man with sienna, cactus-styled hair. He is a power-hungry individual who uses his authority to extort wealth from other players through intimidation and taxes. During the early days of SAO, he blamed beta testers for player deaths, though he later participated in the 1st Floor boss raid as a group leader.

==== Diavel ====
Diavel (ディアベル, Diaberu)
Voiced by: Nobuyuki Hiyama (Japanese); Sean Chiplock (English)

An SAO beta tester and the leader of the 1st Floor boss raid who encouraged many trapped players with his speeches and tactical command. Despite his heroic facade, he secretly viewed Kirito as a rival and attempted to manipulate the raid to secure the Last Attack bonus for himself. He was ultimately killed by "Illfang the Kobold Lord" during the battle after the boss performed an unexpected attack pattern that was different from the beta version of SAO.

=== ALO players ===
==== Sakuya ====
Sakuya (サクヤ)
Voiced by: Sayuri Yahagi (Japanese); Lauren Landa (English)

She is the leader of the Sylph. During a meeting with the Cait Sith, she is attacked by Salamanders led by General Eugene. At the same moment, Kirito flies in to challenge the general to a duel. After Kirito wins the battle, she attempts to seduce him to join the Sylphs, but Leafa smothers their attempt, saying that she is accompanying him to the World Tree. At the end of the arc, Lady Sakuya leads a combined force of Cait Sith and Sylph against the World Tree's Guardians in an attempt to aid Kirito with the battle. After Kirito reached the top of the World Tree, she ordered her forces to pull back. Sakuya is later seen with Alicia and Sylph warriors and a few Cait Sith flying towards New Aincrad.

==== Alicia Rue ====
Alicia Rue (アリシャ・ルー, Arisha Rū)
Voiced by: Chiwa Saito (Japanese); Cristina Vee (English)

She is the leader of the Cait Sith. She was elected for the position of leader by popular vote. She is capable of using the high-level magic «Moonlight Mirror». She forms an alliance with the Sylphs to finish the «Conquer the World Tree Quest».

During the Cait Sith meeting with the Sylph at the Butterfly Valley, the groups were attacked by Salamanders led by General Eugene. Kirito dived in to save the day and fought off Eugene, even though Kirito had inferior equipment. After the Salamanders left the area and Kirito revealed that he was not working for anyone, Alicia tried to seduce Kirito into coming to the Cait Sith territory and working for them, but he declined her offer by saying that he had to go to the World Tree. The next day, along with Sylph reinforcements, she and her squadron of Cait Sith riders, on tamed dragons, aided Kirito's ascension of the World Tree after using the collected funds to purchase armor of at least Ancient grade for all of her warriors. After Kirito managed to get through to the top of the tree, she withdrew her forces from the area. Alicia is later seen with Sakuya and a few Cait Sith and Sylph warriors flying towards New Aincrad.

==== Recon ====
Recon (レコン, Rekon) / Shin'ichi Nagata (長田 慎一, Nagata Shin'ichi)
Voiced by: Ayumu Murase (Japanese); Marin Miller (English)

Suguha's classmate in the real world. He introduced ALO to Suguha who asked him about VRMMO. In ALO, he is a Sylph dagger wielder and dark mage. He also displays an obvious romantic interest in Suguha, although the feelings are not mutual.

==== Eugene ====
Eugene (ユージン, Yūjin)
Voiced by: Kenta Miyake (Japanese); Joshua Tomar (English)

General Eugene intended to disrupt the Cait Sith and Sylph alliance conference. Earlier, Recon manages to learn of the attack and warns Leafa. She and Kirito rush to stop the confrontation, but Eugene challenges the Spriggan to a one-on-one duel. At first, Kirito was forced to defend himself against the onslaught of the Earth-style weapon of Eugene, but Kirito takes Leafa's katana to prepare for his notable «Dual Blades». With this extra blade, Eugene could not breach Kirito's defenses and was quickly defeated. After the duel, he was revived by Sakuya and leaves the scene with his forces on good terms. Before the duel, Eugene was considered the strongest player in the game.

==== Chrysheight ====
Chrysheight (クリスハイト, Kurisuhaito) / Seijirō Kikuoka (菊岡征二郎, Kikuoka Seijirō)
Voiced by: Toshiyuki Morikawa (Japanese); Matthew Mercer (English)

Kikuoka Seijirō is a member of the Ministry of Internal Affairs. After the SAO incident, he interviewed Kazuto for information regarding the events that transpired during the game, in exchange for information on Asuna's whereabouts. After the events of the Fairy Dance arc he has another meeting with Kazuto, to recap the events of SAO again, as well as the events of ALO. He began playing ALO under the name Chrysheight and later contacts Kirito to investigate the Death Gun deaths in GGO.

After Kazuto is attacked in the real world by Johnny Black, Kikouka abducts Kazuto from the hospital and transports him to the Ocean Turtle in order to give him medical treatment for the brain damage he received. It is revealed that Kikouka is actually a Lieutenant Colonel of JSDF and also the head of Rath, a company under the Ministry of Defense, that is trying to develop AI suitable for replacing humans on a battlefield.

After the raid in Rath, Kikuoka faked his death in order to avoid being blamed by the government for the incident and come up with a plan to prevent the government from seizing Alice by getting people to continuely interact with artificial fluctlight.

==== Siune ====
Siune (シウネー, Shiunē) / An Si-eun (施恩アンシウン, An Shiun)
Voiced by: Yū Shimamura (Japanese); Erika Harlacher (English)

The second sub-leader of the Sleeping Knights, Yuuki Konno's guild, and a gentle, emotionally sensitive Undine healer who speaks both Korean and Japanese. In the real world, she wears a wig due to chemotherapy treatments for acute lymphoblastic leukemia but finds strength to continue through her bond with Yuuki. During the quest to clear the 27th Floor of New Aincrad, she provides essential support by casting high-level buffs and healing spells for her teammates. After the guild disbands, she asks Asuna not to seek them out, though she eventually reunites with her after Yuuki's death. Miraculously, Si-eun recovers from her illness and is discharged from the hospital, though she initially feels guilt for outliving her friends.

She later participates in the War of the Underworld, using her bilingual skills to try to persuade Korean players that they are being deceived. And despite being attacked by PoH, she remains a compassionate figure who honors the memory of her fallen guildmates.

==== Jun ====
Jun (ジュン, Jun)
Voiced by: Daiki Yamashita (Japanese); Max Mittelman (English)

A cheerful young Salamander swordsman and a close-range tank of the Sleeping Knights with an offensive and defensive prowess. Despite his battle with cancer, he maintains an easygoing personality and often tells jokes to keep the group's spirits high. In ALO, he appears as a short boy with orange hair in a braid, wields a massive two-handed sword, and wears copper-red plate armor. He is instrumental in the guild's success, even after being targeted by a «Peeping» spell from a rival guild during their first attempt at the 27th Floor Boss. Alongside his friends and Kirito's reinforcements, he fights his way back to the boss room to secure their victory. Following the successful raid, he enjoys social gatherings and celebrations at Asuna's house. After Yuuki passes away, Jun receives hopeful news that his medical treatment is proving effective and his health is improving.

==== Tecchi ====
Tecchi (テッチ, Tecchi)
Voiced by: Nobuyuki Kobushi (Japanese); Chris Cason (English)

A massive and dependable Gnome warrior and the Sleeping Knights' main tank, wielding a heavy mace and a tower shield. Having met his companions in Serene Garden, he joined their quest to leave a mark on the virtual world before the group disbanded. During the battle against the Four-Armed Giant, he uses his «Provoke» skill to manage monster aggression and protect the healers. And in a crucial moment of the boss fight, he acts as a stepping board for Yuuki, allowing her to jump high enough to deliver the final blow. He is a social member of the group who often discusses battle tactics with Jun over drinks at celebrations. Despite the emotional weight of his friends passing, he remains steadfast and participates in clearing the 28th and 29th Floors of New Aincrad. He also joins the group's real-world trips via communication probes to share in their final memories together.

==== Talken ====
Talken (タルケン, Taruken)
Voiced by: Atsushi Tamaru (Japanese); Zach Aguilar (English)

A slender Leprechaun youth and a medium-range damage dealer of the Sleeping Knights, using a long lance and Ancient-level copper-yellow armor. Although he is a skilled fighter, he is shy and often stutters or becomes nervous when speaking to girls like Asuna. He met the other members in Serene Garden and shared in their many adventures across multiple virtual reality titles. During the raid on the 27th Floor of New Aincrad, he is assigned to attack from the sides, coordinating his movements with Nori to distract the boss. After their names are etched on the monument, he celebrates and discusses different types of in-game wine with his guildmates. He continues to support the guild through subsequent Floor clears and joins the trip to Kyoto through a bidirectional communication probe.

==== Nori ====
Nori (ノリ, Nori)
Voiced by: Asami Tano (Japanese); Erica Lindbeck (English)

A physically imposing Spriggan and a medium-range damage dealer of the Sleeping Knights, wielding a long steel quarterstaff and powerful illusion magic. Unlike the typical members of her race, she has a large physique, thick eyebrows, and a black choker that complements her non-metallic armor. She is highly capable in navigation, using night vision spells and illusions to bypass field monsters and reach boss rooms quickly. During the guild's mission of defeating the 27th Floor Boss, she coordinates closely with Talken to provide consistent damage while the tanks hold the front line. She has a warm personality and enjoys sharing wine and stories with her friends during their downtime at Asuna's home. She also remains to be an active participant in the guild's activities through the very end, helping clear the 29th Floor of New Aincrad with a seven-member party.

She stood among the thousands of players who gathered to pay their respects during Yuuki's emotional departure from ALO.

==== Lux ====
Lux (ルクス, Rukusu) / Hiyori Kashiwazaka (柏坂 ひより, Kashiwazaka Hiyori)

Hiyori is one of the main protagonists of the spin-off manga series Sword Art Online: Girls' Ops who originally played Sword Art Online under the avatar Lux. During her time in Aincrad, she was a Green player forced into joining Laughing Coffin as a town infiltration specialist after being rescued from a dungeon trap. Traumatized by the loss of her close NPC friend Rossa (ロッサ, Rossa), who sacrificed herself to save her, Hiyori initially struggled to trust others. Upon the release of ALfheim Online, she created a randomized avatar named Kuro (クロ, Kuro) that strikingly resembled Kirito, whom she deeply admired for clearing the death game. While adventuring to obtain the Ring of Angel's Whisper (天使の指輪, Ringu Obu Enjeruzu Uisupā), she befriended Leafa, Lisbeth, and Silica and imported her original Sylph avatar. Throughout her adventures, she worked to reconcile with her past and a former friend named Gwen (グウェン, Guwen), who initially sought to blackmail her and became the leader of a guild called the "Batty Bats" after Hiyori inadvertently betrayed her during a guild conflict in Aincrad. By facing her fears and embracing her new friendships, she became a protective and caring swordswoman determined to protect those she loves. Following the resolution of these conflicts (with Gwen revealing her real name to Hiyori as Meimi Tsurusaki (鶴崎芽実, Tsurusaki Memi) after they made up in the real world), she began attending the SAO Survivor School, finally finding peace in both the virtual and real worlds.

She also appeared as a playable character in Sword Art Online: Lost Song and Accel World vs. Sword Art Online, voiced by Chinatsu Akasaki.

=== GGO players ===
==== Llenn ====
Llenn (レン, Ren) / Karen Kohiruimaki (小比類巻 香蓮, Kohiruimaki Karen)
Voiced by: Tomori Kusunoki (Japanese); Reba Buhr (English)

As the main protagonist of the spin-off series Sword Art Online Alternative: Gun Gale Online, Karen is a shy girl from Obihiro, Hokkaido who has a complex about her tall height in the real world. As a result, she begins playing Gun Gale Online thanks to the small-statured avatar it gives her. As her avatar Llenn, she wears a pink outfit, which provides camouflage in certain environments, is equipped with a pink FN P90 submachine-gun named "P-chan", and can use super-speed.

==== Pitohui ====
Pitohui (ピトフーイ, Pitofūi) / Elsa Kanzaki (神崎 エルザ, Kanzaki Eruza)
Voiced by: Yoko Hikasa, Reona (singing) (Japanese); Allegra Clark (English)

Elsa is a popular singer and songwriter. She is a former beta-tester for Sword Art Online, but did not log in when it launched due to certain circumstances, thus sparing her from the tragic fate of over 10,000 players for the next two years. Angry that she was not able to participate in the "death game", Elsa channeled all the resentment into her Gun Gale Online avatar; exhibiting lust murder that alienated her from other players. She is a sadist at heart, but more playful in real life as GGO lets her vent; having blackmailed M into working for her night and day years ago when he stalked her (though he enjoys her abuse and saved her from an actual dangerous stalker). She served as Llenn's mentor along with M; forming a friendship with her. She's a Jack-of-All-Stats player who uses many varieties of weapons, but is mostly associated with a Krebs Custom KTR-09 as her main weapon and a Springfield XD as her sidearm. She is also known to possess a red-colored Photon Sword called the Muramasa F9 as her main melee weapon.

==== M ====
M (エム, Emu) / Gōshi Asōgi (阿僧祇 豪志, Asōgi Gōshi)
Voiced by: Kazuyuki Okitsu (Japanese); Ray Chase (English)

Goshi is Elsa Kanzaki's manager and longtime best friend. Formerly an obese man who stalked Elsa during her restaurant waiting days, he came to her rescue when she was attacked by a salaryman, but eventually fell under Elsa's sexual abuse and became somewhat of a secretary to her. Goshi, however enjoyed doing so and lost weight, eventually joining Gun Gale Online alongside her as M, an avatar of a husky male dressed in a green combat battledress. His avatar name was chosen because of his masochistic nature. He is a medium-ranged sniper using the Mk 14 Enhanced Battle Rifle, and has extensive knowledge of military and special operations techniques and tactics. He also has a HK45 as a side arm.

==== Fukaziroh ====
Fukaziroh (フカ次郎, Fukajirō) / Miyu Shinohara (篠原 美優, Shinohara Miyu)
Voiced by: Chinatsu Akasaki (Japanese); Faye Mata (English)

Miyu is Karen's best friend from her hometown in Hokkaido and a huge VR game freak whom Karen receives advice on for. She normally plays Alfheim Online as a Sylph, but will occasionally convert to Gun Gale Online to participate in Squad Jam events under the name Fukaziroh, named after her deceased dog. In GGO, she uses a pair of Milkor MGL grenade launchers as her main set of weapons and a Smith & Wesson M&P as her sidearm.

==== Shirley ====
Shirley (シャーリー, Shārī) / Mai Kirishima (霧島 舞, Kirishima Mai)
Voiced by: Marika Kōno (Japanese); Jeannie Tirado (English)

Mai is a 24-year-old nature guide and hunter from Hokkaido who plays GGO under the name Shirley to refine her real-world marksmanship. Her avatar has green bob-cut hair and professional hunting attire, including a Realtree jacket and a camouflaged baseball cap worn backwards for unobstructed sniping. Despite her initial reluctance toward player versus player combat, she joined the "Northern Country Hunters Club" squadron to maintain professional ties with her colleagues. Her real-world experience as a sika deer hunter allows her to achieve effective one-shot clean kills, a skill she further improved through virtual reality training. During the 2nd Squad Jam, she planned to fail quickly to discourage her team from further combat, only for her and her team to be forced into the main tournament after easily defeating a group of photon sword-wielders.

==== Clarence ====
Clarence (クラレンス, Kurarensu) / Ai Onoda (小野田 亜衣, Onoda Ai)
Voiced by: Mikako Komatsu (Japanese); Laura Stahl (English)

Ai is a supporting character in the Gun Gale Online spin-off series who plays GGO as her masculine avatar Clarence and often collaborates with other top-tier players. During the 2nd Squad Jam, she led an eighteen-man alliance in the jungle, and during the 3rd Squad Jam, she formed a partnership with Shirley after a fierce duel. She is also a selfless teammate who once sacrificed her own position to protect Llenn from incoming gunfire during an ambush.

==== Eva ====
Eva (エヴァ) / Saki Nitobe (新渡戸 咲, Nitobe Saki)
Voiced by: Ayaka Asai (Japanese); Cindy Robinson (English)

Saki is a high school student and the captain of her school's rhythm gymnastics team who leads the squadron Team SHINC in GGO under the name Eva. Her avatar has black braids, which reflects her real-world discipline and leadership skills during Squad Jam tournaments. During the 3rd Squad Jam, she was forced to join Team Betrayers (BTRY) due to a special rule change, though she remains a respected rival to Llenn.

==== Dyne ====
Dyne (ダイン, Dain)
Voiced by: Satoshi Tsuruoka (Japanese); Dan Woren (English)

The rock-solid leader of a PvP squadron who mainly targets weaker, low-risk opponents and has a "poor personality." Despite being a cautious and sometimes overconfident strategist, he is a skillful player who reached the finals of the first 3 BoB tournaments. He wears a yellow cowboy hat and coat while using a rare SIG SG550 assault rifle for long-distance accuracy. During a disastrous ambush against a mob-hunting party, his refusal to prioritize Behemoth, a cloaked bodyguard, led to his squadron's retreat and his own suicide via plasma grenade. He was later eliminated from the 3rd tournament by Pale Rider on a metal bridge. In the real world, he continues to follow gaming news and expressed interest in testing a new grenade launcher with Fukaziroh.

=== Underworld residents ===
==== Selka Zuberg ====
Selka Zuberg (セルカ・ツーベルク, Seruka Tsūberuku)
Voiced by: Kaori Maeda (Japanese); Jackie Lastra (English)

Selka is the younger sister of Alice and an apprentice of Sister Azariya. She is capable of wielding the Sacred Arts but dislikes being compared to her sister. She does not remember Kirito, but is put in charge of him upon his "return".

==== Cardinal ====
Cardinal (カーディナル, Kādinaru)
Voiced by: Sakura Tange (Japanese); Lizzie Freeman (English)

The copy of the original Cardinal System used in SAO, created to oversee Underworld before it was assimilated by Quinella two centuries prior to Kirito's appearance in Underworld. But while Quinella had control over the system's main routine, she had no control over the sub-routine program as it attempted to force her into committing suicide. But the program took advantage to Quinella's attempt overwrite her memories on a preteen nun named Lyserith to attack the Administrator, only to be forced to confine herself in the Great Library which she sealed off from the rest of Underworld. She recruits Kirito to aid her despite initially intending to erase Underworld, only to change her mind. But she was forced to sacrifice herself to keep Quinella from killing Kirito and his friends, using the last of her power to convert Eugeo into a sword to wound Quinella.

==== Ronye Arabel ====
Ronye Arabel (ロニエ・アラベル, Ronye Araberu)
Voiced by: Reina Kondō (Japanese); Deneen Melody (English)

Kirito's valet in the Sword Mastery Academy. She ranked in the top 12 of her year, thus qualifying her to be a valet of an elite swordsman. Since she was of the lowest Noble Class, along with Tiese, she was not chosen by any of the elite swordsmen except for Kirito, who opted to take the last remaining valet. She later develops feelings for Kirito.

==== Tiese Schtrinen ====
Tiese Schtrinen (ティーゼ・シュトリーネン, Tīze Shutorīnen)
Voiced by: Kaori Ishihara (Japanese); Kimberly Woods (English)

Eugeo's valet in the Sword Mastery Academy. She ranked in the top 12 of her year, thus qualifying her to be a valet of an elite swordsman. Since she was of the lowest Noble Class, along with Ronye, she was not chosen by any of the elite swordsmen except for Eugeo, who opted to take the last remaining valet. She entered the Academy in order to raise her family's social status. She later develops feelings for Eugeo.

==== Sortiliena Serlut ====
Sortiliena Serlut (ソルティリーナ・セルルト, Sorutirīna Seruruto)
Voiced by: Megumi Han (Japanese); Jeannie Tirado (English)

Sortiliena Serlut is a supporting character in the Alicization. She was the mentor of Kirito during his first year in the North Centoria Imperial Sword Mastery Academy, and the second-seat elite swordswoman at the academy, where she was known as the Walking Tactics Manual (歩く戦術総覧, Aruku Senjutsu Sōran). She graduated as the first-ranked swordswoman from the academy after defeating the first-seat swordsman Volo Levantein during the graduation tournament and participated in the Norlangarth North Empire Swordsmanship Tournament, where she was defeated by Eldrie Woolsburg. She appears to be quite fond of Kirito, possibly having feelings for him like Ronye, but their relationship is mainly platonic.

==== Frenica Szeski ====
Frenica Szeski (フレニカ・シェスキ, Furenika Shesuki)
Voiced by: Miku Itō (Japanese); Skyler Davenport (English)

Frenica was the valet of Humbert Zizek at the Sword Mastery Academy. She has short light-brown hair and a frail appearance, and she was a humble and skilled yet timid girl who suffered prolonged harassment from Humbert. She later participated in the Human Guardian Army's decoy unit as a nun-in-training to assist with healing duties in the War of the Underworld.

==== Volo Levantein ====
Volo Levantein (ウォロ・リーバンテイン, Uoro Rībantein)
Voiced by: Taishi Murata (Japanese); Chris Niosi (English)

Volo Levantein is a supporting character in the Alicization arc. He was the head elite swordsman-in-training at the North Centoria Imperial Master Sword Academy during Eugeo and Kirito's first year at the academy. He graduated as the second-ranked swordsman from the academy after being defeated by Sortiliena Serlut during the graduation tournament and then participated in the Norlangarth North Empire Swordsmanship Tournament, where he was defeated by Eldrie Woolsburg.

==== Golgorosso Balto ====
Golgorosso Balto (ゴルゴロッソ・バルトー, Gorugorosso Barutō)
Voiced by: Ryō Sugisaki (Japanese); Mick Lauer (English)

Golgorosso Balto is a minor character in the Alicization arc. During Kirito and Eugeo's first year in the North Centoria Imperial Master Sword Academy, he was the 3rd ranked elite swordsman at the academy, in each placing tournament losing against Sortiliena Serlut. Golgorosso is Eugeo's mentor during Eugeo's first year in the academy and is known for making Eugeo take off his clothes so that he can look at Eugeo's muscle development.

==== Airy ====
Airy (エアリー, Earī)
Voiced by: Mao Ichimichi

Airy is a young girl with light brown hair and deep, indigo blue eyes. During her time in the Central Cathedral, she was the emotionless Elevating Operator (昇降係, Shōkō-gakari) for 107 years, who maintained a role of operating the elevating disk between the 50th and 80th floors of the Cathedral through a frozen lifespan granted by Quinella. She assisted Kirito and Eugeo by using her advanced Sacred Arts to propel her elevating disk, and she eventually adopted the name Airy Trume (エアリー・トルーム, Earī Torūmu) and began a new life as a mechanic.

==== Bercouli ====
Bercouli Synthesis One (ベルクーリ・シンセシス・ワン, Berukūri Shinseshisu Wan) / Bercouli Herlentz (ベルクーリ・ハーレンツ, Berukūri Hārentsu)
Voiced by: Junichi Suwabe (Japanese); Imari Williams (English)

Bercouli is the founder of Rulid Village and the very first Integrity Knight. In Rulid Village legend, he was hailed as a hero, but left the village for some time. After he returned, he slew a dragon in a cave through the End Mountains with the Blue Rose Sword. Throughout his long life as an Integrity Knight, Bercouli served as a mentor to both Fanatio and Alice, becoming a surrogate father to the latter. When Eugeo first encounters him, Bercouli had sensed some familiarity with both Eugeo and his weapon, which ultimately led to his defeat. Sometime after Quinella's demise, Bercouli took up the responsibility to rebuild order after the Axiom Church fell. When Alice was captured by Vecta/Gabriel, Bercouli fought Vecta on one-on-one battle. However, he was wounded by Vecta and died in the end but not before he killed Vecta, giving Alice a chance to escape. Soon after, his spirit moved on to the afterlife.

==== Fanatio ====
Fanatio Synthesis Two (ファナティオ・シンセシス・ツー, Fanatio Shinseshisu Tsū)
Voiced by: Hitomi Nabatame (Japanese); Laila Berzins (English)

Fanatio is the Deputy Leader of the Integrity Knights who uses a long-ranged light piercing sword. In battle, Fanatio hides her true gender away from her opponents, as she believes they will not take her seriously because she's a woman, thus her attacks are designed to drive her opponent away from her. After Kirito discovers her identity, Fanatio is led to believe that Kirito is the only one who has taken her seriously since, leading to her defeat. She later has a child with Bercouli 3 months before the war.

==== Deusolbert ====
Deusolbert Synthesis Seven (デュソルバート・シンセシス・セブン, Dyusorubāto Shinseshisu Sebun)
Voiced by: Hikaru Hanada (Japanese); Armen Taylor (English)

Deusolbert is the Integrity Knight who personally apprehended Alice for crossing the Dark Territory. Several years later, he fought and was defeated by both Kirito and Eugeo.

==== Linel and Fizel ====
Linel (リネル, Rineru) & Fizel (フィゼル, Fizeru)
Linel Voiced by: Hina Kino (Japanese); Brianna Knickerbocker (English)
Fizel Voiced by: Konomi Kohara (Japanese); Michelle Marie (English)

Linel Synthesis Twenty-Eight (リネル・シンセシス・トゥエニエイト, Rineru Shinseshisu Tuenieito) and Fizel Synthesis Twenty-Nine (フィゼル・シンセシス・トゥエニナイン, Fizeru Shinseshisu Tueninain) are the two youngest Integrity Knights who as young children were subjected to an experiment run by Quinella, which was to have 30 children kill each other. Quinella would resurrect any child who died just to continue the experiments. The side-effects as according to Linel was a massive personality shift and the discovery of cleaner kills. Being the last ones to come out of the experiment, Quinella allowed them to become Integrity Knights. The two then encountered Kirito and Eugeo, poisoned them, and brought them to Fanatio. Kirito managed to outsmart and paralyze them in return. Linel and Fizel are later shown participating in the war against the Dark Territory.

==== Eldrie Woolsburg ====
Eldrie Woolsburg (エルドリエ・ウールスブルーグ, Erudorie Ūrusuburūgu)
Voiced by: Takeaki Masuyama (Japanese); Ezra Weisz (English)

Eldrie Woolsburg is a champion of the Four Empires Unity Tournament who defeated both Sortilliena Serlut and Volo Levantein, thus earning him an invite to the Central Cathedral. Once arriving, Administrator turned him into an Integrity Knight, and became known as Eldrie Synthesis Thirty-one (エルドリエ・シンセシス・サーティワン, Erudorie Shinseshisu Sātiwan). His first mission was to stop Kirito and Eugeo after they both had escaped from their prison cells, but he was soon defeated. After Alice returned to Rulid Village, Eldrie went to the village to execute Kirito and replead her in joining the resistance against the Dark Territory. He pushed his limits to subdue the Dark Army squadrons and died in Alice's arms.

==== Renly ====
Renly Synthesis Twenty-Seven (レンリ ・シンセシス・トゥエニセブン, Renri Shinseshisu Tueni-sebun)
Voiced by: Mutsumi Tamura (Japanese); Morgan Berry (English)

Renly is one of the youngest Integrity Knights, having achieved the title at the age 15. Once a prodigious swordsman, he accidentally killed his best friend at the Unification Tournament and developed a fear of killing. This stigma would stick with him even after his memory wipe, as he would cower from battle. During the final stress test, he was put in charge of a unit, but ran off right before. However, he witnessed Kirito attempt to save Ronie and Tiese despite being unable to do so, and overcame his cowardliness by saving them and defeating a goblin chief.

==== Sheyta ====
Sheyta Synthesis Twelve (シェータ・シンセシス・トゥエルブ, Shēta Shinseshisu Tuerubu)
Voiced by: Lynn (Japanese); Justine Huxley (English)

Sheyta is a member of the Integrity Knights who doesn't speak much. The Black Lily Sword she wields was made from a fatal black lily by Administrator which can cut through anything. Sheyta was briefly placed in hibernation after accidentally killing an Integrity Knight during a duel. During the fight with the Dark Territory Army, Sheyta managed to wound a lot of pugilist guild members before retreating. She became interested in Iskahn and after the war the two get engaged becoming the bridge between the two lands.

==== Edith ====
Edith Synthesis Ten (イーディス ・シンセシス・テン, Īdisu Shinseshisu Ten)
Voiced by: Kana Hanazawa

She is the tenth member of the Integrity Knights whose also known as the "Knight of the Abyss" due to her skill of using dark element/shadow abilities. She plays a part as one of the key participants during the Underworld saga and also manages to break and face the Taboo Index alone for the sake of her little sister Mary. She is also one of the only members of the Knights who deeply care about Alice.

Originally an original character for the mobile game Sword Art Online: Unleash Blading, Edith's appearance in the main story became official in Unital Ring as one of the Integrity Knights being unfrozen alongside Fanatio 200 years after the defeat of Vecta.

==== Dakira ====
Dakira (ダキラ, Dakira) / Dakira Synthesis Twenty-two (ダキラ・シンセシス・トゥエニツー, Dakira Shinseshisu Tueni-tsū)
Voiced by: Kanako Sakuragi (Japanese); Jennie Kwan (English)

A low-ranking Integrity Knight, Dakira was a girl from a poor fishing village in the Southacroith South Empire who was conscripted after seeking penance for her forbidden love for another girl. She had straw-colored pigtails, freckled cheeks, and a steel-crossed mask, and she wielded a sharp greatsword as a member of the Four Oscillation Blades under the command of Fanatio. During the battle at the Great Eastern Gate, she sacrificed her life by using her bare hands to repel a lethal hammer strike from Sigurosig to protect Fanatio.

=== Ordinal Scale ===
==== Yuna ====
Yuna (ユナ) / Yuuna Shigemura (重村 悠那, Shigemura Yūna)
Voiced by: Sayaka Kanda/Risae Matsuda (Japanese); Ryan Bartley (English)

She was the daughter of Professor Tetsuhiro Shigemura, the childhood friend of Eiji Nochizawa (Nautilus, Eiji), and was one of the 10,000 players who were trapped in Sword Art Online, where she became known as the Song Enchanter (歌エンチャンター, Uta Enchantā) or Utachan (歌チャン or ウタちゃん) due to singing in the Teleport Gate plazas of Aincrad's main towns, as well as having the Chant Extra Skill. She was killed in battle in a field dungeon on the 40th Floor of Aincrad by a group of tormentor-class minions of the Feral Warder Chief that she had drawn to herself to protect her party from being annihilated.

==== Eiji ====
Eiji (エイジ; (OS)) / Eiji Nochizawa (後沢 鋭二, Nochizawa Eiji) / Nautilus (ノーチラス, Nōchirasu; (SAO))
Voiced by: Yoshio Inoue (Japanese); Chris Patton (English)

He is one of the main antagonists of Ordinal Scale and one of the main characters of the Ordinal Scale side stories, including Hopeful Chant and Cordial Chords. He was the childhood friend of Yuuna Shigemura and one of the 10,000 players who were trapped in Sword Art Online, where he suffered from a FullDive Non-Conformity condition that impeded his movement whenever he feared for his life. After Sword Art Online was cleared, Eiji continued his life in seclusion in his apartment, until Yuuna's father, Tetsuhiro Shigemura, recruited him to help with his plan to restore Yuuna as an Artificial Intelligence (AI) by reconstructing her personality from memories of her retrieved from Sword Art Online survivors through brains scans conducted with the Augma when their memories of Sword Art Online were stimulated via fighting SAO bosses in Ordinal Scale. He was betrayed by the professor and eventually surrendered to the police due to having injured the members of Fuurinkazan in real life in the process of gathering memories to revive Yuna. However, he was eventually released as the Fuurinkazan members did not press charges against him. Eiji later appears in Sword Art Online: Alicization – War of Underworld.

==== Tetsuhiro Shigemura ====
Tetsuhiro Shigemura (重村 徹大, Shigemura Tetsuhiro)
Voiced by: Takeshi Kaga (Japanese); Jamieson Price (English)

He is the main developer of Ordinal Scale, Yuna's father, a previous mentor to Akihiko Kayaba, and one of the main antagonists of Ordinal Scale. Tormented by his daughter's death during the SAO incident, he conspired with Eiji to restore Yuna as an AI by gathering memories of her from brain scans of the SAO survivors playing Ordinal Scale, knowing that the device running the game can kill them in the process. He was arrested but later released by Kikuoka to join the company Rath.

=== Unanswered//butterfly ===
==== Rex ====
Rex (レックス, Rekkusu) / Reiichi Kusuda (楠田 礼一, Kusuda Reiichi)
Voiced by: Koki Uchiyama

Rex is one of the main protagonists of Unanswered//butterfly. He is an analytical college student who, having rational thinking and a structured mindset, worked as a real-world tutor for Emirun and helped improve her grades. In SAO, he was secretly a beta tester who lured monsters to kill Lucy and the rest of her party while on a mapping mission with them and Emirun. He possesses a forehead scar and an eyebrow piercing, and he manipulated Emirun into believing that Kirito was the one responsible for the massacre.

==== Emirun ====
Emirun (エミルン, Emirun) / Emi Osanai (小山内 映美, Osanai Emi)
Voiced by: Tomoyo Kurosawa

Emirun is the co-protagonist of Unanswered//butterfly. She is a petite teenage girl with vibrant crimson-red twintails and an infectious optimism that drives her to channel fear into action, as well as an avid gamer who invited Rex to join her in playing SAO but was eventually forced to seek vengeance after witnessing the massacre of her scouting party. Despite the horrors of the death game, she relies on her intuition and emotion to survive while training under Asuna to improve her combat skills.

== Antagonists ==
=== Heathcliff ===
Heathcliff (ヒースクリフ, Hīsukurifu) / Akihiko Kayaba (茅場 晶彦, Kayaba Akihiko)
Voiced by: Tōru Ōkawa (Heathcliff), Kōichi Yamadera (Akihiko Kayaba) (Japanese); Kevin M. Connolly (Heathcliff), Marc Diraison (Akihiko Kayaba), David W. Collins (Akihiko Kayaba; Sword Art Online Progressive: Aria of a Starless Night) (English)

Akihiko Kayaba is the director and creator of the NerveGear and Sword Art Online, as well as the main antagonist of the Aincrad arc. He traps all the players within SAO by using the NerveGear to obstruct signals from the user's brain. Any in-game death or attempt at removal of the NerveGear would result in the real-life death of the user. Later, it is discovered that he has been posing as Heathcliff, the leader of the Knights of the Blood Oath. Although he has the admin authority to make his avatar immortal, he is shown to be a powerful player even without his in-game immortality due to his intimate understanding of the SAO game mechanics which he himself had designed. His only goal in life was to make Aincrad a reality.

When his identity is exposed by Kirito, he challenges Kirito to a one-on-one duel where all of the remaining players will be logged out if Kirito is victorious. Following his defeat, he commits suicide by running a high output scan on his brain, but downloads his own consciousness into the server and leaves behind a program that gives Kirito the World Seed, which revitalizes the VRMMORPG industry.

Richard Eisenbeis of Kotaku compared Heathcliff poorly to the series' second villain, Oberon, writing "How do you make a better villain than a man who trapped 10,000 people in a death game for no adequately explained reason? Easy. You just show how good that guy was by comparison to the new villain."

=== PoH ===
PoH (プー, Pū) / Vassago Casals (ヴァサゴ カザルス, Vasago Kazarusu)
Voiced by: Tsuyoshi Koyama, Nobuhiko Okamoto (young) (Japanese); Xander Mobus (English)

An overarching antagonist and Kirito's nemesis, Vassago is a mercenary known by his username PoH, which is short for "Prince of Hell". He is the illegitimate child of a Mexican mother and a Japanese father, developing a hatred towards people of his father's ethnicity when he was forced to donate a kidney to his father's legitimate son. This motivated Vassago to take advantage of the SAO crisis to log in and establish the "Red player" guild Laughing Coffin, selling out his followers to the other guilds so he can watch the resulting carnage. Vassago resurfaces during the Underworld arc as an employee of Glowgen Defense System and Gabriel Miller's right hand, taking on the account of a Dark Knight to oversee the Dark Territory's invasion. But Vassago, learning of Kirito's presence while losing his account, uploads his PoH account into Underworld and manipulating American, Korean and Chinese gamers into slaughtering the Underworld's residents and the Japanese players' avatars. But Vassago is defeated by Kirito, who turns the mercenary into a Gigas Cedar tree to prevent him from logging out and going after his loved ones. As a result, due to the Underworld's time accelerating, Vassago's body in the real world aged rapidly and mysteriously disappeared as Critter and the rest of their group were collecting their dead comrades before escaping.

=== Kuradeel ===
Kuradeel (クラディール, Kuradīru)
Voiced by: Kōji Yusa (Japanese); Doug Erholtz (English)

A Two-Handed Sword user who is actually an unaccounted member of "Laughing Coffin" who escaped capture and infiltrated the "Knights of the Blood Oath". He was officially assigned as Asuna's bodyguard and despite his grudge, he develops an obsession with Asuna and begins to secretly following her everywhere. When he sees that Kirito and Asuna are developing a relationship, he challenges Kirito to a duel over who can protect her. Kirito wins and Kuradeel is forced to leave. He later tries to murder Kirito and then Asuna, but is instead killed by Kirito at the last second.

==== Rosalia ====
Rosalia (ロザリア, Rozaria)
Voiced by: Megumi Toyoguchi (Japanese); Laura Post (English)

A spear user who leads an Orange guild, called "Titan's Hand," and specializes in scouting for victims while maintaining a deceptive Green cursor. She uses her beauty and charms to lure players into ambushes for loot before attempting to steal a rare «Pneuma Flower» from Silica. Her criminal activities were ultimately stopped by Kirito, who ignored her request for a partnership with him and sent her and her guild to the prison managed by the Aincrad Liberation Force.

=== Oberon ===
Oberon the Fairy King (妖精王オベイロン, Yōsei-ō Obeiron) / Nobuyuki Sugō (須郷 伸之, Sugō Nobuyuki)
Voiced by: Takehito Koyasu (Japanese); Todd Haberkorn (English)

Nobuyuki Sugō is the main antagonist of the Alfheim Online arc. He is the one responsible for keeping 300 NerveGear victims, including Asuna, prisoner even after SAO had ended. He did this by transferring them all into ALO for experiments on human subjugation via fulldive technology. He also attempts to take over RECT Progress Inc. by marrying Asuna while she is unconscious. He displays a perverse interest in consummating this marriage while Asuna is still comatose. In ALO, he takes on the identity of Oberon the Fairy King and makes Asuna his queen, Titania. When he and Kirito finally meet, he flaunts his GM status as well as the results of his research by critically damaging Kirito by increasing Kirito's pain limit and impaling him. However unlike Kayaba, he is a poor fighter and he is defeated by Kirito when the consciousness of Akihiko Kayaba reminded Kirito how he was defeated by Kirito's determination, before aiding him in overcoming Sugō's GM status by using his Kayaba ID Heathcliff and removing Oberon GM Status. Kirito then blinds and dismembers him after setting Sugō's pain limit to the maximum. All 300 victims are released from ALO, but Sugō makes another attempt to attack Kazuto while he is making his way to Asuna in the real world, now blind in one eye and insane after his defeat. However, he is once again subdued by Kazuto, who puts the unarmed combat skills he had learned in SAO to useful effect and ends up cutting his neck. Sugō later survives the cut and is then interrogated for his crimes.

The character was lauded as an "excellent villain" by Kotaku's Richard Eisenbeis, describing him as "cowardly, fancies himself a god, and is torturing people just to make money. More than that, he is also constantly threatening to rape Asuna—both in the game and in the real world. Simply put, he has the greatest hallmark of a good villain: He is a guy you love to hate." Responding to criticism of Oberon being an "over-the-top" villain that is "comically evil", Karen Mead of Japanator.com found to be partially true, writing "would the show be better overall if Sugou was a more subtle villain who didn't take every opportunity to be an absolute douche? Maybe, but keep in mind, as a show about online interactions, demonstrating The Greater Internet Dickwad Theory is definitely in SAO's purview. He may not be a great character who's going to make anyone's "Top Villains We Hate to Love and Love to Hate" list, but he's a villain that makes perfect sense within the context of SAO's world."

Theron Martin of Anime News Network found Sugō's character to an "over the top villain" and "the second arc's biggest stumbling block". However, Rebecca Silverman (also of Anime News Network) disagreed, writing "Sugou actually feels the least over-the-top as he plots how to use the VR technology for his own ends [when compared to the other characters]", and praised him as "nicely evil".

=== Death Gun ===
Sterben (ステルベン, Suteruben) / Death Gun (死銃(デス・ガン), Desu Gan)

Death Gun is the main antagonist of the GGO arc, a player killer whose victims somehow die in the real world after being shot by his signature gun, a Type 54 "Black Star" he named «Death Gun». In reality, Death Gun's actual user name is Sterben and is an alternate account created by Kyōji Shinkawa in the image of his brother's SAO avatar. He and his brother, a former member of the red SAO guild Laughing Coffin, used the Death Gun account to commit murder: Kyōji normally posing as Sterben and using a «Metamaterial Optical Camouflage Mantle» to spy on other players inputting their real life details so his brother can make his way to the house of a potential victim to inject the person with succinylcholine, a drug capable of stopping the heart, at the exact moment the victim's player is shot. During the Bullet of Bullets Tournament, the brothers switched roles while enlisting another Laughing Coffin member to assist them due to the multiple victims they selected.

Red-Eyed XaXa (赤眼のザザ, Akame no Zaza) / Shōichi Shinkawa (新川 昌一, Shinkawa Shōichi)
Voiced by: Ryōta Ōsaka (SAO), Sōichirō Hoshi (GGO) (Japanese); Benjamin Diskin (English)
One of Laughing Coffin's elite members, Red-Eyed XaXa is a sadist who believed in PoH's principles as he became the red guild's second-in-command. In real life, Shoichi's father did not have any expectations for him due to him being frail and sick. After SAO ended, having met Kirito during the Inner-Area incident to neutralize Laughing Coffin, Shoichi aided in Kyōji's Death Gun scheme before he eventually starts playing GGO under the Sterben account. Shoichi entered the Bullet of Bullets tournament to prove his "true" killing ability to the rest of the world, only to be defeated by Kirito before he and his brother are arrested after the GGO arc.
Spiegel (シュピーゲル, Shupīgeru) / Kyōji Shinkawa (新川 恭二, Shinkawa Kyōji)
Voiced by: Natsuki Hanae (Japanese); Johnny Yong Bosch (English)
Shino's friend both in the real world and GGO, in fact he was the one who introduced Shino to GGO in the first place as a form of immersion therapy for her fear of guns. Having been forced to bear the pressure of taking over his family's hospital while bullied at school, Kyōji was more fascinated with Shoichi's murderous exploits in SAO while becoming disillusioned with the real world. Kyōji finally snaps after a famous GGO player tricked him and multiple other newer players into creating weak, agility focused avatars knowing that there was going to be a patch that would give his strength focused character an edge in the upcoming Bullet of Bullets tournament. This resulted with Kyōji creating the Sterben account in XaXa's image and committing murders as Death Gun with the help of XaXa and Johnny Black. Kyōji is also revealed to be romantically obsessed with Shino, having Shoichi be Death Gun during the BoB so he can personally kill her in a murder-suicide and be "reborn" with her in a new world where their modern worries won't exist. But Kirito manages to save Shino and Kyōji is placed in police custody. His fate remains unknown, but it is most likely that he is still being charged as a minor due his age.
Johnny Black (ジョニー・ブラック, Jonī Burakku) / Atsushi Kanamoto (金本 敦, Kanamoto Atsushi)
Voiced by: Ryōta Ōsaka (Japanese); Alejandro Saab (English)
One of Laughing Coffin's elite members, Johnny Black is a cold-blooded killer who likes to play with his victims as he once suggested to XaXa and PoH to have a fight-to-the-death with their captives Schmitt, Caynz, and Yolko for fun. Sometime after SAO, Atsushi helped Shoichi and his brother in their Death Gun scheme and was the only member of their gang to escape arrest. Six months later, Atsushi returns and attempts to kill Kazuto and Asuna in the real world but failed and was subdue and arrested by the police. Atsushi came close to killing Kazuto with a succinylcholine syringe, but is himself severely wounded, as being stabbed through his leg with an umbrella by Kazuto.

=== Thrym ===
Thrym (スリュム, Suryumu)
Voiced by: Iizuka Shōzō (Japanese); John Snyder (English)

The King of the Frost Giants and final boss of the Calibur side story, Thrym is an artificial intelligence that ALO's Cardinal System created from the actual Norse myth. But in a departure from usual NPCs, Thrym is one of few whose core programming is connected to ALO's language engine to be a more realistic character. In the game storyline, Thyrm emerged from Aflheim and used the stolen Excalibur to conquer the Hill Giants' realm of Jötunheim. With Jötunheim turned to a frozen wasteland after losing the World Tree's blessing, Thrym created his fortress Thrymheim from the frozen spring of the Hill Giant leader Urðr, after its waters were lodged in the tree's receding roots. Thrym then uses his forces, and players he recruits on a false quest, to slaughter the native beasts to cripple the power of Urðr and her sisters so he can reach the surface of Alfheim and obtain the golden apple growing on top of the World Tree. But as Kirito and his party realize upon taking Urðr's quest to stop him, Thrym's actions would cause a chain of events that would result in the Ragnarok scenario and ultimately reset ALO. The group find Thrym and manage to defeat him with the help of a NPC named Freyja, who was revealed to be Thor in disguise.

=== Quinella ===
Quinella (クィネラ, Kwinera) / Administrator (アドミニストレータ, Adominisutorēta)
Voiced by: Maaya Sakamoto (Japanese); Maureen Price (English)

The true ruler of Underworld, the highest minister of the Axiom Church, and the main antagonist of the Underworld arc. 350 years before Kirito would enter the Underworld, Quinella was born. As a descendant of a wicked founder, she inherited unethical knowledge by studying the Sacred Arts intensely. Soon, she learned that by killing others, ones' stats could be heavily raised, so every night she would sneak out and kill animals, which would respawn everyday anyway. She raised her stats to a ridiculously high level and decided to take control over the Underworld. Fooling people into believing she was a goddess, she created the Axiom Church and made laws to maintain the people to a certain degree. In the process, she tried to find a way to transcend the limit of that world, the «Life» of that world. She unlocks the forbidden System Control Authority command on the brink of death and immediately uses it to recuperate herself, restoring her beauty and «Life» to her former appearance as a youth. After being critically wounded in a battle against Kirito, she attempted to preserve herself by leaving to the real world but was intervened by the gruesome senate Chudelkin, who set his body ablaze to reach her. With Quinella latched by Chudelkin, the two were soon engulfed by the flame and perished.

==== Chudelkin ====
Chudelkin (チュデルキン, Chuderukin)
Voiced by: Wataru Takagi (Japanese); Frank Torado (English)

Chudelkin was a dwarf-like creature that served as the Chief Elder (元老長, Genrōchō) of the Axiom Church in Underworld, working directly under Supreme Priest Quinella. He has a twisted and sinister infatuation with Quinella. Chudelkin burned to death alongside Quinella at the end of the battle at the top of the Central Cathedral.

=== Yanai ===
Yanai (柳井, Yanai)
Voiced by: Yusuke Numata (Japanese); Chris Cason (English)

Yanai is a Rath technicians who previously worked for Sugou in ALfheim Online via a slug-like avatar, selling out his co-worker to avoid criminal charges and becoming a spy for the Americans within the Ocean Turtle. Establishing the Seal of the Right Eye, "Code: 871" based on the kanji in his name, Yanai played a role in establishing corruption with the Human Empire's nobility and became an admirer of Quinella as he secretly aided her. Following Quinella's death while aiding Gabriel's group, Yanai holds Higa at gunpoint and reveals his act of sabotaging UW and intention of keeping Kirito from being revived. But Kikuoka and Rinko realize Yanai's betrayal, with the latter saving Higa by dropping a heavy wrench that caused Yanai to lose his balance and fall down a shaft to his death.

=== Critter ===
Critter (クリッター, Kurittā)
Voiced by: Isshin Chiba (Japanese); Jon Allen (English)

Critter is a hacker consultant who works in the Glowgen Defense Systems' cyber operations department where he works for Gabriel Miller and Vassago Cassals. He found the accounts of Emperor Vecta and the Dark Knight, which weren't password-locked for Gabriel and Vassago to use. When Gabriel and Vassago end up dying, Critter and the rest of Subtilizer's minions collect their dead comrades before leaving and setting up the Ocean Turtle to explode. However, Akihiko Kayaba defuses the explosive and Critter also finds out that his comrades never found Vassago's body.

==== Ugachi ====
Ugachi (ウガチ, Ugachi)
Voiced by: Takaguchi Kousuke (Japanese); Armen Taylor (English)

Ugachi, also called Lizard Killer Ugachi (蜥蜴殺しウガチ, Tokage-goroshi Ugachi), was a minor antagonist in the Alicization Arc. He was the leader of a small scouting party of goblins from the Dark Territory who captured Selka and was planning to sell her in the Dark Territory. He was killed by Kirito after he fatally injured Eugeo in an attempt to save Selka in the End Mountains.

==== Raios Antinous ====
Raios Antinous (ライオス・アンティノス, Raiosu Antinosu)
Voiced by: Shūhei Iwase (Japanese); Steve Cannon (English)

Raios was the eldest son of a third class noble family and a swordsman-in-training at the Norlangarth Empire's Sword Mastery Academy. He had a tall and burly body and long, wavy, blonde hair, and he wore a custom-made red uniform during his second year as the head elite swordsman-in-training. He was a prideful and cunning nobleman who used legal loopholes and his high status to cruelly manipulate or hurt others, but he eventually met his end when his Fluctlight died due to a conflict regarding the Taboo Index after a confrontation with Kirito and Eugeo.

==== Humbert Zizek ====
Humbert Zizek (ウンベール・ジーゼック, Unbēru Jīzekku)
Voiced by: Ryuichi Kijima (Japanese); Chris Hackney (English)

Humbert is a fourth class noble and the only friend and follower of Raios at the Imperial Sword Mastery Academy. He has oil-plastered gray hair and wears a pale yellow elite uniform, and was a hot-headed and sadistic individual who often participated in Raios's schemes to taunt and insult commoners like Eugeo. During one conflict, he attempted to use his noble rights, alongside Raios, to "punish" Ronye and Tiese, but he ultimately fled in a state of shock after Eugeo and Kirito intervened and defeated Raios.

=== Gabriel Miller / Subtilizer / Emperor Vecta ===
Gabriel Miller (ガブリエル・ミラー, Gaburieru Mirā) / Subtilizer (魂を盗む者(サトライザー), Satoraizā; lit. 'The one who steals souls')
Voiced by: Akira Ishida, Rie Kugimiya (child) (Japanese); Ted Stroka, Greg Chun (in "War of Underworld"), Amanda C. Miller (child) (English)

Gabriel Miller is the primary antagonist of the second half of the Alicization Arc, the chief tactical officer of «Glowgen Defense Systems» and the son of the company's founding president. He developed a morbid interest in the human soul as a child when he murdered his friend Alicia Klingerman, spurring him to utilize FullDive technology and became a legend in GGO as Subtilizer due his skills of predicting his opponents' moves and ambush them for a quick kill. Gabriel is later hired by the National Security Agency to acquire Alice's Fluctlight cube, developing an interest in her due to her resemblance to Alicia. During the raid, Gabriel uses the account of Emperor Vecta (ベクタ, Bekuta), a dark god who reigns over the Dark Territory, to rally the Dark Territory's peoples to wage war on the Human Empire. After being forced to use his Subtilizer account and continue fighting, Gabriel is killed when Kirito overloads his fluctlight. Gabriel's soul returns to the real world and discovers that his physical body is dead due to what happened in Underworld. He is then forcibly dragged to Hell by what appears to be Alicia and his other victims.

=== Dark Territory Army ===
The following are members of the Dark Territory's army that were used by Subtilizer in his "Emperor Vecta" avatar:

==== Vixur Ul Shasta ====
Vixur Ul Shasta (ビクスル・ウル・シャスター, Bikusuru Uru Shasutā)
Voiced by: Hiroki Tōchi (Japanese); Steve Blum (English)

Vixur Ul Shasta is the commander of the Order of the Dark Knights. Unlike the rest of the Dark Territory's leaders, Vixur wanted peace and was against the plans of Emperor Vecta when he arrived. When Vixur attempted to attack Vecta, he was stabbed with a poisoned needle used by Fu Za. As he died, Vixur unleashed the recollection ability of his sword, which created a tornado that ravaged the Fluctlights of anything it came in contact with.

==== Lipia Zancale ====
Lipia Zancale (リピア・ザンケール, Ripia Zankēru)
Voiced by: Sayaka Senbongi (Japanese); Abby Trott (English)

Lipia Zancale is an 11th-ranked Dark Knight in the Dark Territory and Vixur Ul Shasta's subordinate who she loved. As a supporter of his peace campaign, Lipia found Vixur threatened upon the arrival of Emperor Vecta sometime after Administrator's death. In an attempt to assassinate him, Lipia was strangled to death by Vecta.

==== Fu Zha ====
Fu Zha (フ・ザ, Fu Za)
Voiced by: Kōki Harasawa (Japanese); Jon Allen (English)

Fu Zha is the leader of the Assassins Guild who became loyal to Emperor Vecta. When Vixur Ul Shasta tried to attack Emperor Vecta, Fu Zha used a concealed Ruberyl-poisoned throwing needle to kill him. He was subsequently killed by Shasta's Incarnate attack.

==== Hagashi ====
Voiced by: Mitsuaki Kanuka (Japanese); Joe Hernandez (English)

Hagashi is the chief of the Mountain Goblins.

==== Kosogi ====
Voiced by: Shunichi Maki (Japanese); Kellen Goff (English)

Kosogi is the new chief of the Mountain Goblins after Hagashi was killed by Vixur Ul Shasta's incarnate ability in attempt to assassinate Emperor Vecta, He was killed by Renly.

==== Kiburi ====
Voiced by: Hiroki Gotō (Japanese); Kellen Goff (English)

Kiburi is the chief of the Plains Goblins.

==== Shibori ====
Voiced by: Masashi Yamane (Japanese); Joe Hernandez (English)

Shibori is the new chief of the Plains Goblins after Kiburi was killed by Vixur Ul Shasta's incarnate ability in attempt to assassinate Emperor Vecta, He was killed by Deusolbert.

==== Furgr ====
Furgr (フルグル, Furuguru)
Voiced by: Daichi Endo (Japanese); Armen Taylor (English)

Furgr is the chief of his tribe of Ogres (depicted in the Underworld as a race of towering humanoid wolves). He and his Ogre tribe took part in the Battle at the Eastern Gate in Emperor Vecta's campaign to obtain Alice. While suffering injuries from the battle with Alice, Furgr was killed by Alice.

==== Sigurosig ====
Sigurosig (シグロシグ, Shiguroshigu)
Voiced by: Takanori Hoshino (Japanese); Brook Chalmers (English)

Sigurosig is the chief of his tribe of Giants and their representative at the Ten Lords Assembly in the Dark Territory. He and his Giant tribe took part in the Battle at the Eastern Gate in Emperor Vecta's campaign to obtain Alice. He was killed by Fanatio after one of her subordinates sacrificed themselves to save her.

==== Lilpilin ====
Lilpilin (リルピリン, Rirupirin)
Voiced by: Junya Enoki (Japanese); Aleks Le (English)

Lilpilin is the chief of his tribe of Orcs (depicted in the Underworld as a race of humanoid pigs). During the fight against the Red Knights, he and his remaining Orcs side with Kirito's friends.

==== Dee Eye Ell ====
Dee Eye Ell (ディー・アイ・エル, Dī Ai Eru)
Voiced by: Yūko Kaida (Japanese); Kari Wahlgren (English)

Dee Eye Ell is the leader of the Black Mages Guild. She despises the goblins, orcs, ogres, and other demi-humans and burns with ambition, hoping to take over as the Dark Territory's ruler one day, She was killed by Leafa with help from Lilpillin.

==== Iskahn ====
Iskahn (イスカーン, Isukān)
Voiced by: Taku Yashiro (Japanese); Khoi Dao (English)

Iskahn is the Tenth Champion (第十代チャンピオン, Dai Jū-dai Chanpion) and leader of the Pugilists Guild, as well as a member of the Ten Lords Assembly that controlled the Dark Territory. Iskahn was one of the leaders of the Dark Territory who participated in the battle at the Great Eastern Gate against the Human Guardian Army, commanding the unit of Pugilists. During the battle, Iskahn and his Pugilists were ordered to pursue the decoy unit of the Human Guardian Army when they escaped southwards into the Dark Territory, where Iskahn dueled against Sheyta Synthesis Twelve and became interested in her.

==== Rengil Gira Scobo ====
Voiced by: Kiyomitsu Mizuuchi (Japanese); Kellen Goff (English)

Rengil Gira Scobo is the chief of the Commerce Guild, the Dark Territory's non-combatant group. He announced Emperor Vecta's return to Vixur Ul Shasta and the other members of the Dark Territory's Ten Lords.

== Original game characters ==
=== Infinity Moment and Hollow Fragment ===
==== Strea ====
Strea (ストレア, Sutorea)
Voiced by: Sachika Misawa

An unknown player who started tailing Kirito after the events of the 75th Floor's boss fight. Throughout the story, Strea would be seen in the Labyrinth searching for «something». Strea was later revealed to actually be a mental-health program, similar to Yui, who was somehow able to appear using an unused avatar that was still registered in Aincrad. However, the near-death experience had slowly altered her data and resulted in her fusion with the «Hollow Avatar». Yui absorbed Strea's program and assured the rest of the group that she was still alive.

==== Philia ====
Philia (フィリア, Firia) / Kotone Takemiya (琴音)
Voiced by: Yui Ishikawa

An "Orange player" and treasure hunter. Kirito met Philia immediately after being suddenly teleported to the Hollow Area region of Aincrad then fight a weakened version of the Skull Reaper. Philia's orange player status was actually a system glitch. She has grown a romantic interest in Kirito when saving her from the clutches of PoH.

=== Lost Song ===
==== Seven ====
Seven (セブン, Sebun) / Nanairo Arshavin (七色 アルシャービン, Nanairo Arushābin)
Voiced by: Hisako Kanemoto

Nanairo Arshavin, nicknamed Seven, is a Russian scientist who is playing ALO to research VR. She graduated from MIT at the age of 12 and is a pop idol, performing concerts in-game as a Pooka. Considered "the light" to Akihiko Kayaba's "darkness", she is the leader of the guild Shamrock in the game. Unlike her guild members, she is of a lower level, and lets them fight for her.

==== Rain ====
Rain (レイン, Rein) / Nijika Karatachi (枳殻 虹架, Karatachi Nijika)
Voiced by: Miyu Takagi

A Leprechaun girl who follows Kirito during the events of the game. She is Seven's older sister, and works at a maid cafe when not playing ALO. Like Kirito, she is an SAO survivor and can dual wield. After the events of the game, she meets Kirito in real life, where she reveals the rift between her and Seven; after SAO was cleared, she talked with Kikuoka Seijirō about it, and decided to join ALO.

==== Sumeragi ====
Sumeragi (スメラギ) / Yota Sumeragi (住良木 良太, Sumeragi Yōta)
Voiced by: Ryōta Takeuchi

An Undine and Shamrock leader who is in charge of protecting Seven. A strong swordsman, he defeated General Eugene in combat prior to the events of the game. Outside of ALO, he is Seven's research partner in America.

During the story, Kirito and Sumeragi encounter each other at various times, and the two challenge each other to a duel, which is interrupted. At the final dungeon, Sumeragi and Kirito resume their duel, where the former reveals his Original Sword Skill, which is inspired by the Norse god of war Týr and has the power of a two-handed sword compressed into a one-handed sword.

Sumeragi works as a quantum neurology researcher, and his affiliation with Seven prompted Kikouka to request him to perform surveillance on her while experimenting.

=== Hollow Realization ===
==== Premiere ====
Premiere (プレミア, Puremia)
Voiced by: Yuiko Tatsumi

She is a 14-year old Non-Player Character (NPC), born from the creation of Sword Art: Origin. She was a quest giving NPC. Originally, Premiere had no pre-programmed settings to determine her behavior or interactions with players. However, after meeting Kirito's group, she began to develop an inquisitive and childlike nature, often learning and utilizing words and phrases she heard from other players.

==== Tia ====
Tia (ティア)
Voiced by: Yuiko Tatsumi

Premiere's twin sister who is also an NPC, born from the creation of Sword Art: Origin. Like her sister, Tia was originally a null NPC, having no pre-programmed responses or behavior. However, after encountering and spending time around Genesis, she began adopting many traits of his attitude, including his belief in survival of the fittest and his disregard for other NPCs. She also developed an intense hatred for other people, due to their openly hostile attitude and contempt towards Genesis.

==== Genesis ====
Genesis (ジェネシス, Jeneshisu)
Voiced by: Kazuyuki Okitsu

A trance player with a wild, frenzied look when he is fixated on combat with a berserker fighting style to match. He has no regard for Non-Player Characters (NPCs), considering them unworthy of his attention. He is known as the «Black Swordsman» (黒の剣士, Kuro no Kenshi) by the players of Sword Art: Origin. It was later revealed that he is a famous hacker known as the «God of Cheats» (ゴッドオブチート, Goddo Obu Chīto; abbreviated as «GOC»).

=== Integral Factor ===
==== Protagonist (Integral Factor) ====
The Protagonist is the main character of Sword Art Online: Integral Factor. The protagonist is a former SAO beta tester and one of the players that were trapped in the game after it launched.

==== Koharu Honda ====
Koharu Honda (本多 小春, Honda Koharu)
Voiced by: Ari Ozawa

A former SAO beta tester, but she hasn't played a serious VR game before SAO. She met and learned combat from the protagonist during beta testing, and they became friends. They swore to meet again after the official game was released.

==== Sanya ====
Sanya (サーニャ, Sānya) / Alexandra Yuryevna Knyazeva (アレクサンドラ・ユーリエヴナ・クニャゼワ, Arekusandora Yūrievuna Kunyazewa)
Voiced by: Aoi Koga

Sanya is a Russian, independent solo player. She wields a one-handed sword called "Finsternis," whose life-stealing abilities and attack-chain enhancement have earned her the title “Silver Witch,” although she denies the rumors that she kills or steals for power. After coming to Japan in search of her childhood friend Nijika, she becomes trapped in SAO and remains determined to escape, support the Assault Team, protect children, and slowly accept friendship with the Protagonist, Koharu, Sasha, and others despite her guarded, impulsive, and sometimes judgmental nature.

=== Fatal Bullet ===
==== Protagonist (Fatal Bullet) ====
The Protagonist is the main character of Sword Art Online: Fatal Bullet. The Protagonist began playing Gun Gale Online (GGO) due to the request of their childhood friend Kureha.

==== Kureha ====
Kureha (クレハ) / Momiji Takamine (高峰 紅葉, Takamine Momiji)
Voiced by: Ayane Sakura

GGO's protagonist's childhood friend, who invites them to log in to Gun Gale Online. She is a veteran player, who has been playing since its early days. Kureha is bright and cheerful, with a meddlesome personality, and considers it her job to personally protect the protagonist. She plays Gun Gale Online to realise her own strength, and spares no effort to discover that strength.

==== Arfasys / Rei ====
Arfasys (アファシス, Afashisu) / Rei (零, Rei)
Voiced by: Natsumi Takamori (Female); Kazutomi Yamamoto (Male)

The ArFA-Sys is a rare Type-X AfFA-Sys that appeared as part of the new update to Gun Gale Online. The protagonist encounters it following the tutorial mission. Throughout the game, the others have nicknamed the AfFA-Sys, Rei. She is the key to the new SBC Flugel dungeon.

==== Zeliska ====
Zeliska (ツェリスカ, Tsērisuka) / Midoriko Hoshiyama (星山 翠子, Hoshiyama Midoriko)
Voiced by: Mamiko Noto

Zeliska is a skilled yet mysterious player in GGO who also owns a Type-X AfFA-sys, affectionally named Daisy. In real life, she is a programmer for the Gun Gale Online Japanese servers. While she is highly regarded for her unmatched skill, she is not on any of the Ranking Leaderboards, thus earning her the nickname The Uncrowned Queen (無冠の女王, Mukan no Joō).

==== Itsuki ====
Itsuki (イツキ, Itsuki) / Yukitsugu Sai (狭井 雪嗣, Sai Yukitsugu)
Voiced by: Tatsuhisa Suzuki

Itsuki is the leader of the most powerful Squadron in Gun Gale Online, Alphard. While he is seemingly a calm and carefree player, Itsuki is secretly on a constant search for something to excite him. This obsession leads to him becoming the main antagonist of Fatal Bullet.

=== Alicization Lycoris ===
==== Medina Orthinanos ====
Medina Orthinanos (メディナ・オルティナノス, Medina Orutinanosu)
Voiced by: Miho Okasaki

Medina is the ninth-generation head of the Orthinanos Family, a family of second-rank nobles. She became the head of the family after her father was killed in a tragic accident. Her and her family are labeled as "defects", and as such, she aims to become an Integrity Knight so that she can clear the tarnished legacy of the Orthinanos name.

=== Last Recollection ===
==== Dorothy Isaiah Elisheva ====
Dorothy (ドロシー, Doroshī) / Dorothy Isaiah Elisheva (ドロシー・イザヤ・エリシュヴァ, Doroshī Izaya Erisheba)
Voiced by: Rina Satō

Dorothy is an apprentice Dark Knight known as the Child of Sin (大罪の子ども, Taizai no Kodomo) due to her forbidden mixed heritage. She wields the scythe Azuretear and later the divine Starlight Banner, and she strives to make peace between the Dark Territory and the Human Empire alongside Kirito's group. Despite being hunted for her immense Life and facing internal conflict over her parents' legacy, she eventually breaks her Seal of the Right Eye to help defeat Subtilizer and protect the Underworld.

=== Variant Showdown ===
==== Layla ====
Layla (レイラ, Reira)
Voiced by: Sumire Uesaka

Layla is a protective sister who enters a VR game called Cross Edge to uncover the truth behind her younger brother Michael's sudden coma. Driven to save him after a corporate conspiracy by Epsilon left him comatose, she initially spied on and opposed Kirito under the guidance of PoH. She eventually learned to trust Kirito, joining his party to fight alongside them, liberate the game, and rescue her brother's consciousness.

=== Fractured Daydream ===
==== Fuuka Natsuyagi ====
Fuuka (フウカ, Fuuka) / Fuuka Natsuyagi (夏八木 風花, Natsuyagi Fuuka)
Voiced by: Reina Ueda

Fuuka is a gentle woman with a rare FullDive condition called "overfitting" that allows her to perceive raw digital data. Driven to improve virtual technology, she became a Galaxia test player but unintentionally triggered a massive crisis by compassionately restoring the corrupted character data of Vecta. After overcoming traumatic memory suppression and an identity swap with her AI companion Neige (ネージュ, Nēju), she used her unique sensory abilities to expose Vecta's weaknesses for Kirito's party, help defeat him, and restore Galaxia.

=== Echoes of Aincrad ===
==== Iori ====
Iori (イオリ, Iori) / Rio Saiki (斉木 理央, Saiki Rio)
Voiced by: Kana Ichinose (Japanese); Jessica Peterson (English)

Iori is the deuteragonist of Echoes of Aincrad who initially used a burly male avatar to navigate SAO before being restored to her true female appearance. She wields a one-handed sword and a distinctive crest-shaped red shield while wearing an ice blue dress. As a former beta tester, she guides the protagonist through Aincrad as one of the 10,000 trapped players.

==== Zash ====
Zash (ザッシュ, Zasshu)
Voiced by: Yūya Hirose (Japanese); Kieran Regan (English)

Zash is a protective young man trapped in SAO who cares for his friends while wielding a large two-handed sword. He is usually friendly toward his companions but remains a poor judge of character, often becoming paranoid and distant toward those he does not yet trust. Despite his social struggles and personal flaw of "not being a morning person", he always apologizes once others have proven their worth to him.

==== Stina ====
Stina (スティーナ, Sutīna)
Voiced by: Manaka Iwami (Japanese); Emily Foulger (English)

Stina is a quiet exchange student from Sweden and a former SAO beta tester who addresses others politely. She suffers from a deep discomfort around men due to a negative experience with a former party member during the game's beta test.

==== Musoh ====
Musoh (ムソウ, Musō)
Voiced by: Anri Katsu (Japanese); Alejandro Saab (English)

Musoh is a seasoned veteran gamer in his thirties who acts as a highly effective duelist and one of the protagonist's party's tanks (alongside Zash), though his easy-going personality often hides his true, complex intentions. He possesses keen powers of observation that allow him to analyze boss patterns from a distance before dealing massive damage in the fray. While he admits to being "poor with kids", his astute tactical habits make him a terrifyingly effective asset to the front lines.

==== Saayu ====
Saayu (サーユ, Sāyu)
Voiced by: Sayumi Suzushiro (Japanese); Rebecca Wang (English)

Saayu was a cheerful college graduate and SAO beta tester who became the heart of the protagonist's party after being the first person to join them. She wielded a two-handed sword and wore beginner armor and had her shoulder-length blonde hair and orange eyes. After witnessing her friend Clark's death and losing hope, she threw herself off a cliff in a desperate, delusional attempt to return to the real world.

==== Wyzeman ====
Wyzeman (ワイズマン, Waizuman)
Voiced by: Tasuku Hatanaka (Japanese); Kylen Deporter (English)

Wyzeman is a tall, serious lore enthusiast who acts as a "dependable voice of reason" and a fierce warrior in silver-plated steel armor. He consistently keeps his team grounded during high-stakes situations until the devastating deaths of his close friends Saayu and Clark breaks his spirit. Following this trauma, he abandons the protagonist's side and refuses Iori's and Zash's attempt to comfort him, unable to maintain his fierce determination.

== Other characters ==
=== Midori Kirigaya ===
Midori Kirigaya (桐ヶ谷 翠, Kirigaya Midori)
Voiced by: Aya Endō (Japanese); Caitlin Glass (English)

Midori is Suguha's mother as well as Kazuto's aunt and foster mother in the real world. She cares deeply for both her children. In volume 10, she is assured by the authorities of Kazuto's safety. In reality, Kazuto's comatose body was kidnapped by Kikuoka Seijirou. When Asuna and Suguha tried to tell her their suspicions, she did not believe them.

=== Shōzō Yuuki ===
Shōzō Yuuki (結城 彰三, Yūki Shōzō)
Voiced by: Kazuhiro Yamaji (Japanese); Keith Silverstein (English)

Shōzō is Asuna's father and the former CEO of RECT Progress Inc, which goes bankrupt after the company is partly held responsible for Sugō's crimes.

=== Endou ===
Endou (遠藤, Endō)
Voiced by: Yoko Hikasa (Japanese); Colleen Ann Villard (English)

Endou is a manipulative person who approached Shino and pretended to be her friend just to be able to use Shino's home for personal use and as a place to stay overnight after getting drunk. She uses Shino's phobia to make her scared of her. After the Death Gun incident, she is surprised to see Shino overcome her phobia.

=== Natsuki Aki ===
Natsuki Aki (安岐 ナツキ, Aki Natsuki)
Voiced by: Ayako Kawasumi (Japanese); Julie Ann Taylor (English)

Natsuki is the nurse who oversaw Kazuto during his rehabilitation after the SAO incident. She watched over him during his investigation over Death Gun in GGO. She was appointed to nurse him at Ocean Turtle after he was poisoned by the last member of Laughing Coffin.

=== Dr. Kurahashi ===
Kurahashi (倉橋, Kurahashi)
Voiced by: Hidenobu Kiuchi (Japanese); Robbie Daymond (English)

Kurahashi is a plump, bespectacled doctor in his early thirties who manages the long-term care department at the Yokohama Kōhoku General Hospital. He was responsible for treating Yuuki Konno's HIV and was the one who persuaded her to use the Medicuboid.

=== Kyouko Yuuki ===
Kyouko Yuuki (結城 京子, Yūki Kyōko) / Erika (エリカ)
Voiced by: Megumi Hayashibara (Japanese); Johanna Luis (English)

Kyouko is a professor who is Asuna's mother. She attempts to take Asuna under her wing to become a woman with a rich husband, denying her wishes to stay with Kazuto. Though she initially does not understand the fascination of the virtual world, Asuna has her mother visit ALO. There, Kyouko discovers that Asuna's home in ALO looks like her childhood home, a forest-house. The experience inspires Kyouko to tell her daughter to work hard to get the husband she wants.

=== Rinko Koujiro ===
Rinko Koujiro (神代凛子, Kōjiro Rinko)
Voiced by: Sanae Kobayashi (Japanese); Jennifer Losi (English)

Rinko is a professor, co-worker and also a former love-interest of Akihiko Kayaba. In the SAO arc, she initially helped in the development of SAO and when the incident occurred, she was the only person who guessed where Akihiko was. Without telling anyone and avoiding the police, she decided to confront Akihiko in his hidden mountain cottage with the intent to kill him, but she was not able to do so and instead helped maintain Akihiko's physical condition, when he dived into the game for long periods of time. After the incident, the police found the cottage where both of them stayed. While Akihiko had already died after digitizing his brain to the network permanently, Rinko was arrested by the police and awaited her trial. Apparently, she was released on bail from her trial. In the Alicization arc, she has been invited by Seijirou Kikuoka to do a top secret research on the «Soul Translator» technology, but has been reluctant to accept the offer. Until, one day, upon learning Asuna's situation, she agreed to help the girl find Kazuto, so she contacted Kikuoka about accepting the invitation. Rinko and Asuna traveled to the hidden base of Rath, the «Ocean Turtle». After the raid in Rath, Rinko replaces Kikuoka as the head of Rath after he faked his own death and introduces Alice as the first autonomous Artificial Intelligence to the public.

=== Takeru Higa ===
Takeru Higa (比嘉タケル, Higa Takeru)
Voiced by: Kenji Nojima (Japanese); Brian Beacock (English)

Takeru is the Chief Developer of the «Soul Translator», working under Seijirou Kikuoka in Rath. He helped create «Underworld» as a means to produce «Bottom-Up-Artificial Intelligence» via nurturing a mass number of Artificial Fluctlights, in order to further advance Japan's military force. Before working in Rath, Takeru went to university with Akihiko Kayaba and Rinko Koujiro. He was the last student of the Shigemura lab in the «Touto University of Electrical and Electronic Engineering» which had two prodigious figures: Akihiko Kayaba and Nobuyuki Sugou. He was inspired to join Rath due to a death of his friend who was a soldier. After the War of the Underworld, Higa secretly made a digital copy of Kazuto Kirigaya's Fluctlight without telling Kikuoka or Koujiro. He then agreed to help Kazuto's copy and Kabaya's digital consciousness to establish a way to keep Underworld safe from Japan's military.

=== Minetaka Kirigaya ===
Voiced by: Shunsuke Sakuya (Japanese); John DeMita (English)

Minetaka is Suguha's father and Kazuto's uncle and foster father in the real world. He was first seen after Kazuto logged out of the Underworld. He is strict and hopes Kazuto would focus more on school. And while he expects Kazuto to always apologize when endangering his life in VRMMO games, he is proud of Kazuto's heroism and encourages him to live with no regrets.

=== Alicia Klingerman ===
Alicia Klingerman (アリシア・クリンガーマン, Arishia Kuringāman)
Voiced by: Ai Kayano (Japanese); Kayli Mills (English)

Alicia is a shy and quiet, "innocent and delicate" girl with blue eyes and long brown hair, and the childhood friend of Gabriel Miller. She was murdered by Gabriel during the Global Financial Crisis in 2008.
