= Overgeared =

South Korean web novel series

- Author: Saenal Park
- Country: South Korea
- Language: Korean
- Genre: LitRPG, Action, Virtual Reality and Crafting
- Publisher: KakaoPage (Korean web novel); Maru Publishing (Korean); Wuxiaworld (English web novel)
- Published: November 14, 2014 – April 26, 2024 (KakaoPage); January 10, 2014 – December 1, 2023 (Maru Publishing); October 15, 2017 – June 20, 2024 (Wuxiaworld)
- Media type: Web novel
- No. of books: 57

Overgeared

템빨 RR: Temppal MR: T'emppal
- Genre: Action comedy
- Author: Monohumbug
- Illustrator: Team Argo
- English publisher: NA: Yen Press
- Webtoon service: KakaoPage (Korean); Tapas (English)
- Original run: April 1, 2020 – present
- Anime television series
- Directed by: Ayako Kōno
- Written by: Kenta Ihara
- Music by: Yoshiaki Fujisawa
- Studio: J.C.Staff
- Licensed by: Crunchyroll
- Original network: Tokyo MX, BS11, AT-X
- Original run: October 2, 2026 – present
- Episodes: 6

Overgeared (Korean: 템빨) is a South Korean web novel series written by Saenal. It was serialized on Kakao's web novel platform KakaoPage from November 2014 to April 2024. A manhwa adaptation, which was released as a webtoon, adapted by Monohumbug and illustrated by Team Argo, began serialization on KakaoPage in April 2020. A Japanese anime television series adaptation produced by J.C.Staff premiered in October 2026.

== Plot ==
Shin Young-woo works odd jobs to make money while spending several hours a day playing the virtual reality game Satisfy under the moniker "Grid". He is not very skilled at the game and levels up slower than other players. However, one day Young-woo is granted an S-rank quest, which he completes and earns a scroll that allows his character to advance to legendary class as a reward. Using this new class, Young-woo is able to reverse his fortunes.

== Characters ==
Shin Young-woo/Takumi Nagamine/Grid
Voiced by: Tatsumaru Tachibana (Japanese); Ricco Fajardo (English)
The protagonist of the series, Grid wants to do well in the game Satisfy so he can make money like other top players. He gets the chance to do so when he acquires the Legendary class "Pagma's Successor", a blacksmithing class that helps him forge valuable weapons and armor. He later obtains a title, "Apostle of Justice".
Yura
Voiced by: Asami Seto (Japanese); Morgan Lauré Garrett (English)
One of the top-ranked players in the game, despite having one of the more common classes, "Black Mage/Magician". Yura first comes across Grid during a questline involving the Cult/Church of Yatan.
Euphemina
Voiced by: Saya Fukuzumi (Japanese); Jill Harris (English)
A 19-year-old player who has the Epic class "Duplicator", Euphemina is capable of copying the skills of NPCs and other players.
Huroi
Voiced by: Shuntaro Takayama (Japanese); Yung-I Chang (English)
A player from Mongolia, Huroi has the class "Orator", which allows him to shift quests by talking to NPCs in order to gain more favorable conditions and rewards. He becomes the first player to wield a second class, "Partner of Apostle of Justice", thanks to Grid.
Jishuka
Voiced by: Riho Sugiyama (Japanese); Sonia Ellis (English)
Toban
Voiced by: Masaaki Mizunaka (Japanese); Markus Lloyd (English)
Regas
Voiced by: Ko Bonkobara (Japanese); Kieran Flitton (English)
Vantner
Voiced by: Masaya Fukunishi (Japanese); Ian Sinclair (English)
Pon
Voiced by: Kōhei Amasaki
Faker
Voiced by: Shun'ichi Toki (Japanese); Corey Wilder (English)
Irene
Voiced by: Yūki Murata (Japanese); Alexis Tipton (English)
Isabel
Voiced by: Yurika Hirayama
Kahn

== Production ==
Saenal was a fan of reading books and playing video games as a child, and so they desired to create a book with a setting similar to a video game. Saenal also stated that the basic premise was inspired by the novel Legendary Moonlight Sculptor, while the details were inspired by the video game Lineage. Saenal intentionally created the protagonist as lacking skills from the beginning so that they could show the character's growth as the story progresses. Saenal believed that this approach would allow the reader to empathize with the character.

== Media ==
=== Novel ===
Written by Saenal, the web novel was serialized on Kakao's platform KakaoPage from November 14, 2014, to April 26, 2024. Maru Publishing published the novel in print in 57 volumes. Wuxiaworld published the novel in English digitally.

=== Manhwa ===
A manhwa adaptation, which was released as a webtoon, adapted by Monohumbug and illustrated by Team Argo, began serialization on KakaoPage on April 1, 2020. It is published in English digitally by Tapas. At Sakura-Con 2023, Yen Press's Ize Press imprint announced that they would be publishing the webtoon in print.

=== Anime ===
An anime television series adaptation was announced on June 3, 2026. It is produced by Egg Firm, animated by J.C.Staff and directed by Ayako Kōno, with Kenta Ihara handling series composition, Ryousuke Tanigawa designing the characters, and Yoshiaki Fujisawa composing the music. The series premiered on October 2, 2026, on Tokyo MX other networks. The opening theme song is "SATISFY" performed by Re:name, and the ending theme song is "Ray of Emotion" performed by Tao. Crunchyroll is streaming the series.

==== Episodes ====
No.	Title	Directed by	Written by	Storyboarded by	Original release date (Note: Episodes are released on Prime Video and Crunchyroll 6 days before their televised airings.)
1	"Legendary Job Change"; Transliteration: "Rejendarī Tenshoku" (Japanese: レジェンダリー転職)	Ayako Kōno	Kenta Ihara	Ayako Kōno	October 2, 2026
Takumi Nagamine, aka Grid, is a huge fan of the VR-MMORPG game Satisfy. He wants to reach a point in the game to where he can convert in-game currency to real world money, but is currently in debt for student loans and his VR setup, having to take up manual labor jobs to pay off his debts. Between working and playing, he rarely takes time to rest. While working on a secret quest, Grid obtains a Legendary Class Book, which he plans to sell. However, he gets trapped by a large group of enemies. Hoping the new class will save him, Grid uses the Book to change his class to "Pagma's Successor", which comes with several powerful abilities. Unfortunately, the Book resets him to level 1, causing the enemies to kill him instantly. For dying and failing to complete his quest, he gets a 2 level penalty drop, putting him at -1. The next time Grid logs in, he finds himself forced to complete rescue mission against Yura, a top-ranked player. Grid dies again, and his level drops to -3. Unbeknownst to Takumi, the game's creators are closely observing Grid's actions.
2	"First Step Towards Being a Blacksmith"; Transliteration: "Tan'ya Shokunin no Daiippo" (Japanese: 鍛冶職人の第一歩)	Kōzō Kaihō	Kenta Ihara	Ayako Kōno	October 9, 2026
Despite his death, the two NPCs of Grid's rescue mission manage to escape, with one NPC giving the other a ring that Grid will recognize. Meanwhile, Grid finds himself respawned in a village surrounded by level 100 monsters. Rejected by the Tzedakah Guild for being too low level, and not having any money to travel to a safer area, Grid goes to the village blacksmith and becomes his apprentice, learning how to chop wood, mine for ore, and forge arrows, bringing him to level 3. He even manages to make and sell an epic quality arrow. Members of the Tzedakah Guild he met earlier find the epic arrow in the market, but don't know who made it, and are ambitious to find the maker. Outside of the game, Takumi is exhausted at work due to gaming. His parents, worried about his health, give him money that he would make from a day's work so he doesn't have to work tomorrow. The next time he logs in, Grid goes to Windmill Village, the lowest level village, to work as an apprentice for the local blacksmith there, Kahn, protecting him from an attack launched by The Marrow Company, an evil NPC group.
3	"Second Class"; Transliteration: "Dai 2 Shokugyō" (Japanese: 第２職業)	Shunji Yoshida	Kenta Ihara	Kōichi Takada, Ayako Kōno	October 16, 2026
Yura goes onto a Satisfy talk show to discuss classes with Roy, who has one of the three known Epic classes, Blood Warrior. Meanwhile, as Grid starts learning to forge a sword, he overhears a player, Huroi, talk with NPCs for a quest to help the Marrow company, but decides to change tactics to help the villagers instead by talking to the village's lord Earl Steim. Grid asks why Huroi switched, and Huroi explains that getting involved in NPCs' stories unlocks secret quests, and shows Grid the new quest he unlocked. Huroi gets captured, and his quest changes to stay logged in for 50 real-time hours in exchange for holding a 2nd class. Meanwhile, Grid and another player, Euphemina, are each given a quest by the Marrow company for a blacksmith duel, with the prize being Huroi's freedom.
4	"Item Crafting Face-Off"; Transliteration: "Aitemu Seisaku Taiketsu" (Japanese: アイテム製作対決)	Ryō Andō	Kenta Ihara	Ryō Andō	October 23, 2026
For the Blacksmith duel, Grid and Euphemina each must forge a dagger. Euphemina gives Grid a handicap in order to duplicate Kahn's skills. Grid creates the better dagger, but the leader of the Marrow company arrests him before he can present, letting Euphemina win by default. Euphemina breaks Grid out of prison, in exchange for him forging an Orb in the near future. Grid rescues Huroi, letting them each gain a second class: "Apostle of Justice" and "Partner of Apostle of Justice". Together, the three of them eradicate the Marrow Company. To prevent a group like the Marrow Company from existing again, Lord Earl Steim has sent an NPC to manage Windmill Village: Irene, the same NPC that survived Grid's rescue quest, and his daughter.
5	"Family's Trust"; Transliteration: "Kazoku no Shin'yō" (Japanese: 家族の信用)	Kakushi Ifuku	Kenta Ihara	Kakushi Ifuku	October 30, 2026
One month after the Blacksmith duel, Euphemina gets ambushed by the Tzedakah Guild, who are searching for the player that made the Epic Arrow, but Euphemina defeats them and escapes. Meanwhile, Grid has been blacksmithing whenever he logs in after work, and can now make significant money selling his armor and weapons, despite his bad luck causing him to mostly forge common and only few of Epic value. Takumi wants continue leveling his skills so he can make more money, but his parents don't believe he's capable of making money in the game. Despite this, Takumi decides to spend time at an internet cafe to play the game during his normal work hours, eventually selling 2 Epic swords and 1 Legendary sword to Irene, making a large amount of cash. The game’s developers pity him, as they know that the Legendary sword could have made him a lot more money in the near future. After returning home one day, Takumi learns his father is 80 million yen in debt. Takumi reveals he has made 24.8 million yen from the game, and offers it to his dad. Takumi’s dad accepts, now respecting Takumi’s gaming as his potential career.
6	"First Boss Raid"; Transliteration: "Hatsu no Bosu Reido" (Japanese: 初のボスレイド)	TBA	TBA	TBA	November 1, 2026
Despite being equipped with Grid's Legendary sword, Lord Earl Steim's army is unable to defeat the cult of Yatan, thanks to Yura. As a result, several quests are available to help defeat the cult of Yatan. Meanwhile, Grid's bond with Kahn increases, and he receives a quest from the spirit of Kahn's ancestors to learn more about Pagma. In order to prepare for the quest, Grid decides to create a stealth cloak, and goes to fight frost orcs to gain materials for it. Huroi, grateful for Grid's help with his last mission, offers his help. Together, they face off against a mob of Frost Orcs and their boss, with Huroi sacrificing himself for Grid to finish the boss.
7	"Pagma's Sword Dance"; Transliteration: "Paguma no kenbu" (パグマの剣舞)	TBA	TBA	TBA	November 8, 2026

=== Video game ===
A video game adaptation, developed by Gray Games and published by Nexon, is in development under the codename "Project T".

== Reception ==
In South Korea, the series has been viewed 1.3 billion times and generated ₩10 billion in revenue.
