= Do Re Mi Fa So La Ti Do (film) =

2008 film by Kang Geon-hyang

- Original Theatrical Poster
- Hangul: 도레미파솔라시도
- RR: Doremipasollasido
- MR: Toremip'asollasido
- Directed by: Kang Geon-hyang
- Starring: Jang Keun-suk; Cha Ye-ryun; Jeong Eui-cheol; Im Ju-hwan; Park Min-ji; Nah Eun-kyeong; Lee Mae-ri
- Production company: New Crayon Entertainment
- Distributed by: Cinema Service
- Release date: April 3, 2008
- Running time: 105 minutes
- Country: South Korea
- Language: Korean
- Box office: $1,060,319

Do Re Mi Fa So La Ti Do (Korean: 도레미파솔라시도) is a 2008 South Korean romantic drama film based on the web novel of the same title by Guiyeoni. Directed by Kang Geon-hyang (assistant director of Romance of Their Own) and produced by New Crayon Entertainment. The film received 199,151 admissions nationwide.

== Synopsis ==
Based on the internet novel of the same title and written by Guiyeoni, Do Re Mi Fa So La Ti Do is a touching love story with bittersweet elements.

Jung-won wears a funny dragon suit, while working at the amusement park, and pours soda on Eun-gyu, because of his taunts. A short while later, Jung-won finds out that Eun-gyu has moved into the house next to hers. Eun-gyu now threatens to tell Jung-won's parents that she works part-time at a local mart. To keep Eun-gyu quiet, Jung-won agrees to carry his guitar for a week.

Jung-won then starts to develop feelings for Eun-gyu, who is the lead singer of a band called Do Re Mi Fa So La Ti Do. Eun-gyu also starts to develop similar feelings for Jung-won. The two soon become a couple.

With an odd twist of fate, Jung-won went to the band's rehearsal room and meets a familiar person from her past, a boy named Hee-won. Their relationship makes everything more complicated. For 10 years, Jung-won and Hee-won were close friends. One day, Jung-won witnessed a hit-and-run and reported the license plate to the police but the driver turned out to be Hee-won's father. Because of that, Hee-won's family broke apart and they stopped talking to each other completely after Hee-won's father was arrested. Hee-won, seeking revenge at Jun-won, told his "friends" to beat her, rendering her crippled. Jung-won is now surprised to learn that her ex-close friend is now best friends with her boyfriend.

Hee-won admits that he still likes his best friend despite what she did and he wants her back. Hee-won makes her choose between him and Eun-gyu by threatening suicide. Jung-won chooses Hee-won, leaving Eun-gyu devastated. He gives her one last chance to come back to him but she breaks his heart again and chooses Hee-won.

A few months later, Jung-won and Hee-won learn that Eun-gyu was in a car accident and was diagnosed with temporary amnesia. Hee-won lets Jung-won go and she spends all her time trying to get Eun-gyu to remember. The last scene is an re-enactment of the band's last show, the one in which Eun-gyu gave her a last chance. The movie ends with him remembering everything and begging Jun-won not to leave him again. She promises she never will. As the final credits roll we see how all of their lives improved.

== Cast ==
- Cha Ye-ryun as Yoon Jung Won
- Jang Keun-suk as Shin Eun Gyu
- Jung Eui-chul as Kang Hee Won
- Lim Ju-hwan as Jae Kwang
- Han Soo-yeon as band's member
- Lee Eon-jeong as Eun Gyu's sister
- Park Min-ji as band member
- Kim Hye-ok as Jung Won's Mother
- Moon Won-joo as Deok-pal

== Music ==
Track number	Title	English title	Performed by
01	Intro		
02	(Korean: 도레미파솔라시도) Doremifasolatido (Movie Version)	Doremifasolatido (Movie Version)	Jeong Jun Il
03	(Korean: 기다리는 시간)	Time Of Waiting	Jeong Jun Il
04	(Korean: 햇살 가득히)	Full Sunlight	Jeong Jun Il
05	(Korean: 용가리) Yonggari	Heap Song	Jeong Jun Il
06	(Korean: 희원과 정원)	Desire And Attain	
07.	(Korean: 사랑해서... 미안해I) Saranghae seo ...mianhae I	Sorry...for loving you I	
08	(Korean: 희원의 갈등 그리고...)	Desire's Conflicts And...	
09	(Korean: 기다리는 시간) (Piano Version)	The Time Of Waiting (Piano Version)	
10	(Korean: 사랑해서... 미안해II) Saranghae seo ...mianhae II	Sorry...for loving you II	
11	Episode 1	Episode 1	ROTS (Hwang Ho Jin)
12	(Korean: 도레미파솔라시도) Doremifasolatido(Original Version)	Doremifasolatido (Original Version)	Song Hee Ran
