= Not-Sew-Wicked Stepmom =

South Korean web novel

- First webtoon adaptation volume cover

계모인데, 딸이 너무 귀여워 RR: gyemoinde, ttari neomu gwiyeowo MR: kyemoinde, ttari nŏmu kwiyŏwŏ
- Genre: Fantasy, isekai
- Author: Iru
- Illustrator: Mo9Rang
- Publisher: Atempo Media (South Korea); Ichijinsha (Japan)
- English publisher: NA: Yen Press
- Webtoon service: KakaoPage (South Korea); Piccoma (Japan); Tapas (English)
- Original run: April 11, 2021 – November 4, 2026
- Volumes: 11
- Anime television series

Not-Sew-Wicked Stepmom (Korean: 계모인데, 딸이 너무 귀여워, romanized: Gyemo Inde, Ttal-i Neomu Gwiyeowo, Japanese: 継母だけど娘が可愛すぎる, romanized: Mamahaha dakedo, Musume ga Kawaisugiru) is a South Korean web novel written by Iru. It was serialized via Kakao's digital comic and fiction platform KakaoPage from January to May 2019, with a side story being serialized from August to September of the same year. A manhwa adaptation, which was released as a webtoon and illustrated by Mo9Rang, was serialized online via KakaoPage from April 2021 to November 2026. An anime television series adaptation has been announced.

== Plot ==
After dying in South Korea, children's clothing designer Baekhap wakes up in the body of Abigail, the wicked queen in the fairy tale Snow White. She's confused and more than a little upset, but when she realizes that her husband has been neglecting his daughter Blanche and allowing both 18th-century cultural norms and her governess to cause her pain, she snaps into action. Blanche is the sweetest, cutest little girl Abigail has ever seen, and she desperately wants her to be happy…and as she begins helping her stepdaughter, she realizes that Blanche isn't the only member of the royal family who needs her.

== Characters ==
Abigail Freidkin
The main protagonist who originally a jealous, insecure villainess; now inhabited by the soul of kindhearted Korean designer Lilly Lee, who fiercely dotes on Blanche.
Blanche Freidkin
A timid, sweet-natured stepdaughter who gradually overcomes her fear of Abigail and comes to view her as her true mother.
Sabrian Freidkin
Abigail's husband and aloof King of Nerghen who initially distrusts Abigail's sudden personality shift before growing genuinely devoted to her and Blanche.
Veritus
An ally who becomes her confidant and helps her navigate palace life and her relationship with Sabrian.

== Media ==
=== Novel ===
Written by Iru, the web novel was serialized on Kakao's digital platform KakaoPage on January 11 to May 10, 2019; a side story was serialized on the same platform from August 11 to September 11 of the same year. Crescendo published the novel in print in five volumes, with illustrations by Dinorex.

=== Manhwa ===
A manhwa adaptation, which was released as a webtoon and illustrated by Mo9Rang, was serialized on KakaoPage from April 11, 2021 to November 4, 2026. It is published in Japan in print by Ichijinsha and in English digitally by Tapas. In February 2023, Yen Press' Ize Press imprint announced that they would be publishing the webtoon in print.

No.	Original release date	Original ISBN	English release date	English ISBN
1	March 18, 2024	978-4-08-870175-2	August 22, 2023	979-8-4009-0050-1
2	April 18, 2024	978-4-75-801883-8	November 21, 2023	979-8-4009-0078-5
3	July 20, 2024	978-4-75-801912-5	February 20, 2024	979-8-4009-0091-4
4	November 20, 2024	978-4-75-801933-0	June 18, 2024	979-8-4009-0167-6
5	March 18, 2025	978-4-75-801974-3	September 17, 2024	979-8-4009-0222-2
6	July 18, 2025	978-4-75-808741-4	June 17, 2025	979-8-4009-0328-1
7	November 20, 2025	978-4-75-808844-2	November 11, 2025	979-8-4009-0420-2
8	March 18, 2026	978-4-75-808986-9	January 20, 2026	979-8-4009-0438-7
9	July 17, 2026	978-4-82-510016-9	June 16, 2026	979-8-4009-0523-0
10	November 19, 2026	978-4-82-510208-8	October 20, 2026	979-8-4009-0591-9

=== Anime ===
On November 19, 2026, an anime television series adaptation was announced.
