= VRMMORPG =

Video game genre

VRMMORPG (short for virtual reality massively multiplayer online role-playing game; sometimes referred to just as VRMMO) is a subgenre of video games, combining aspects of massively multiplayer online role-playing games (MMORPGs) and virtual reality games to incorporate virtual reality (VR) technologies to create immersive virtual worlds.

VRMMORPGs are also a subgenre of science fiction. As depicted in fiction, advanced VRMMORPGs often allow players to experience virtual worlds through neural interfaces that simulate all the senses, unlike existing VR games that use headsets and controllers. In turn, works such as Sword Art Online have also influenced public expectations of VR technology.

== Characteristics ==
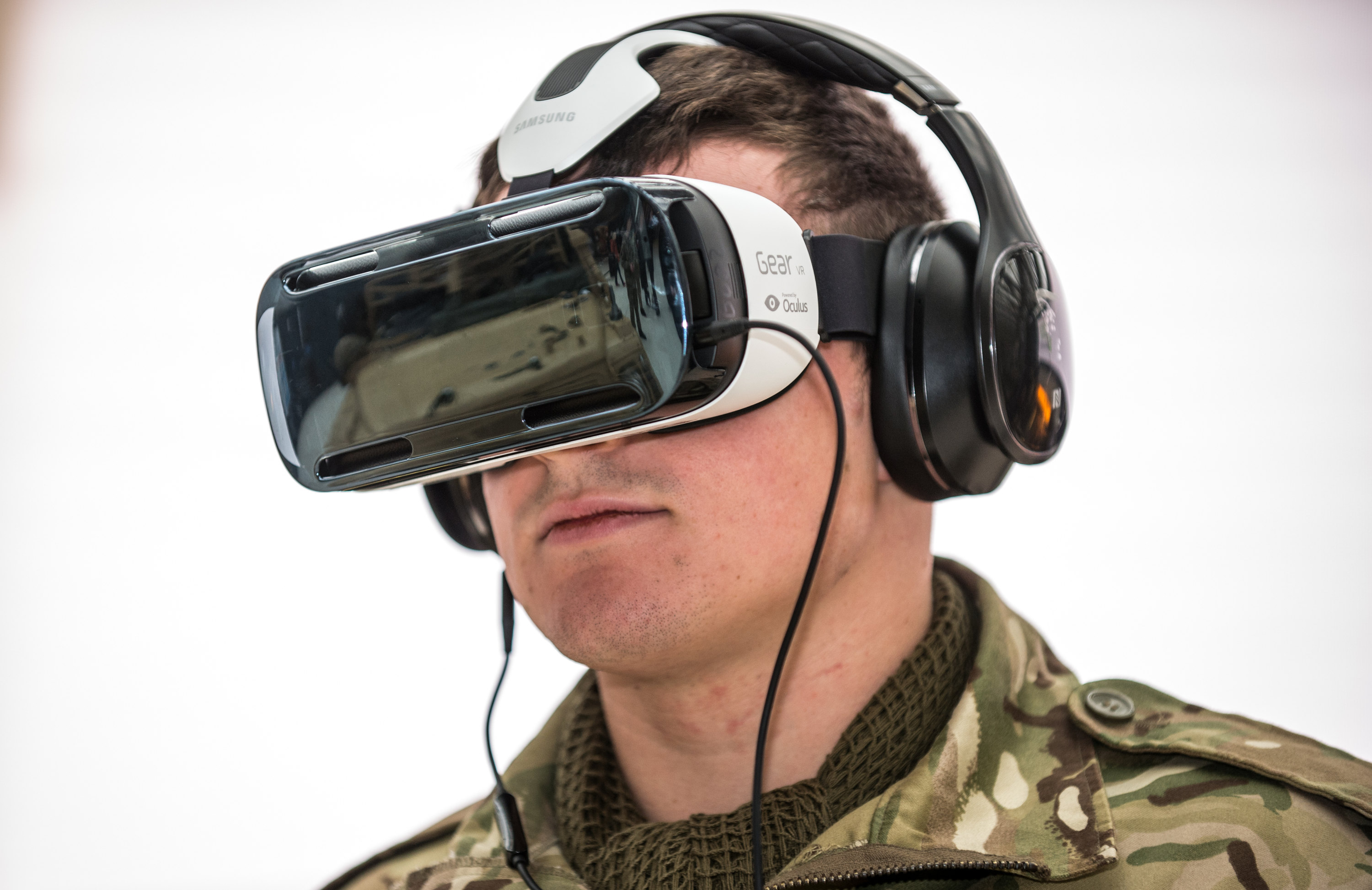
VR headsets are a popular tool for playing VRMMORPGs

VRMMORPGs place emphasis on immersion, physical interaction, and multiplayer social interaction within virtual environments. Unlike conventional MMORPGs, VRMMORPGs require specialized interface and interaction systems adapted to virtual reality technology, such as VR headsets. VRMMORPGs require more powerful hardware than conventional MMORPGs, which has limited their adoption.

Conventional user interface elements such as HUDs, mini-maps, and pop-up windows may disrupt immersion in VR environments. As a result, VRMMORPGs often employ diegetic interfaces integrated into the game world itself, such as virtual wrist-mounted displays or in-world inventory systems.

VRMMORPGs also differ from traditional MMORPGs in their use of physical interaction systems. Instead of relying primarily on button presses, players may interact with virtual objects through gestures, motion controllers, or hand tracking.

== Development challenges ==
VRMMORPGs combine two technically demanding fields: virtual reality systems and massively multiplayer online games. Challenges include maintaining immersion, preventing motion sickness, supporting large-scale multiplayer networking, and balancing accessibility with complex gameplay systems.

Network latency can disrupt immersion and social interaction by delaying the synchronization of player movements. VRMMORPGs also require high frame rates and optimization to reduce discomfort and motion sickness.

Social interaction systems in VRMMORPGs may include voice chat with positional audio, gesture-based communication, and personal-space protection systems designed to prevent harassment or discomfort between players.

Karpeeva and Khafizov identify artificial intelligence as an increasingly important component of VRMMORPG design. Proposed applications include AI-controlled non-player characters capable of natural-language interaction, adaptive difficulty systems, procedural content generation, and automated moderation systems.

== Video games ==
Early dedicated VRMMORPGs include OrbusVR and Zenith: The Last City (2022). They use consumer VR headsets rather than the neural interfaces common in fictional full-dive systems. Zenith: The Last City has also been cited as an early attempt to create a large-scale immersive multiplayer world. Other VR games, such as Half-Life: Alyx and Into the Radius, have been cited for design approaches relevant to VRMMORPG development, although they are not VRMMORPGs themselves.

== In fiction and culture ==
VRMMORPG fiction is a form of speculative fiction about virtual reality and role-playing video games that overlaps with LitRPG. Precursors can be found in cyberpunk and other fiction about virtual reality, including William Gibson's Neuromancer (1984), Neal Stephenson's Snow Crash (1992), and Tad Williams's Otherland series, beginning with City of Golden Shadow (1996). These works dealt mainly with cyberspace, virtual worlds, and metaverses rather than RPG mechanics. Earlier stories about people trapped in virtual environments include Jacek Dukaj's Irrehaare (1995) and holodeck episodes of Star Trek: The Next Generation, such as "The Big Goodbye" (1988).

Japanese light novels and anime helped establish VRMMORPG fiction in the early 2000s. An early example was the .hack franchise, which began with the anime .hack//Sign and a series of video games in 2002. Sword Art Online popularized the terms "VRMMO" and "full dive", the latter referring to complete sensory immersion in a virtual game world.

Sword Art Online began as a web novel in 2002, was published as a light novel series from 2009, and was adapted into anime in 2012. Other works featuring immersive or game-derived worlds include Log Horizon (first serialized online in 2010, published as light novels from 2011 and adapted into anime in 2013) and the novel Ready Player One (2011). Unlike Sword Art Online and Ready Player One, which portray games accessed through immersive VR hardware, Log Horizon concerns players transported into an MMORPG world.

In Sword Art Online, the players must complete a game to escape, and in-game death causes death in the physical world. In Log Horizon, players can return after in-game death, and the story instead focuses on establishing social and political institutions and relations with sentient non-player characters.

Other works using related settings and tropes include Accel World (2012), Overlord (2015–2022), Infinite Dendrogram (2020), Shangri-La Frontier (2023), and A Playthrough of a Certain Dude's VRMMO Life. The genre also developed outside Japan, including in Korean web novels such as Legendary Moonlight Sculptor (2007–2019) and Overgeared (2014–2024), and Chinese web novels such as Virtual World: Unparalleled Under the Sky (2012–current) and Reincarnation of the Strongest Sword God (2014–current). In Chinese VRMMO fiction, plots involving a protagonist returning to an earlier point in a game's history are particularly common. English-language examples include The Gam3, Viridian Gate Online, and Awaken Online, all begun in 2016. In Vasily Mahanenko's The Way of the Shaman (2012–2018), the protagonist serves a prison sentence inside a VRMMORPG.

These works shaped popular expectations surrounding virtual reality technologies and influenced discourse surrounding contemporary VR development. For example, Oculus founder Palmer Luckey cited both Sword Art Online and Ready Player One as important inspirations for his work. In particular, Sword Art Online has been described as one of the defining franchises associated with fictional VRMMORPG settings.

Many examples of VRMMORPG fiction incorporate medieval fantasy environments, magical systems, castles, and world-tree imagery derived from earlier fantasy traditions. They also overlap with Japanese isekai fiction, especially stories in which characters become trapped in game-derived worlds. Related "RPG-world isekai" stories instead depict worlds with levels, classes, and other game mechanics without establishing that those worlds originated as VR simulations. The distinction may become less apparent in stories where characters remain permanently in the game-derived world. Fictional VRMMORPG worlds frequently feature large cities, multi-level dungeons, and interconnected fantasy environments designed for exploration and progression.

A recurring plot device is that players cannot leave a game, as in .hack. In Sword Art Online, escape requires clearing the game, a version of the "Win to Exit" scenario.

=== Selected fictional works ===
Examples of works featuring fictional VRMMORPGs include:

- .hack
- A Playthrough of a Certain Dude's VRMMO Life
- Accel World
- Bishōjo ni Natta Kedo, Netoge Haijin Yattemasu.
- Bofuri
- Dimension Wave
- Full Dive
- Hikari no Umi no Apeiria
- iD_eNTITY
- In the Land of Leadale
- Infinite Dendrogram
- Legendary Moonlight Sculptor
- Log Horizon
- Overlord
- Ready Player One
- Shangri-La Frontier
- She Professed Herself Pupil of the Wise Man
- Sword Art Online
- The New Gate
- The Way of the Shaman
- Warcross

== See also ==
- Open world
- Progression fantasy
- Simulation hypothesis
- Xianxia
