= Got Dropped Into A Ghost Story, Still Gotta Work =

South Korean web novel by Baek-Deok-su on Kakaopage

- Cover As Seen On Kakaopage

괴담에 떨어져도 출근을 해야 하는구나 RR: Goedame tteoreojeodo chulgeuneul haeya haneunguna MR: Koedame ttŏrŏjŏdo ch'ulgŭnŭl haeya hanŭn'guna
- Genre: Horror, Modern Fantasy, Action, Supernatural
- Author: Baek Deok-su (백덕수)
- Illustrator: Uoongpig (Novel); Ssyung-Nyung (Manhwa)
- Publisher: KW Books
- Demographic: 15+
- Magazine: (South Korea) Kakaopage
- Webtoon service: (South Korea) Kakaopage
- Original run: October 4, 2024
- Collected volumes: 3 Parts To Date (Web Novel)

Even If I Fall Into A Ghost Story, I Still Have To Go To Work (Korean: 괴담에 떨어져도 출근을 해야 하는구나), by Baek Deok-su is a South Korean webnovel first published on October 4, 2024 on the platform Kakaopage under the publisher KW Books and is currently ongoing serialization.

== Plot ==
The story centers around Kim Soleum, an office worker with an obsession with a collaborative horror-story wiki known as the "Darkness Exploration Records." During a pop-up event for the same wiki, for which he skips work to attend and buy merch he wins the grand roulette's first prize, and gets sucked into the world of the wiki he had read over the many years of his life after an encounter with a strange employee at that event. He now only has one goal in mind, to survive and go home.

== Worldview ==
=== Darkness Exploration Records ===
<Prophecies Of The Apocalypse: Darkness Exploration Records> (KR: 종말예언 : 어둠탐사기록), very often simplified into 'Darkness Exploration Records (DER)', is a famous fictional worldview with a touch of supernatural fantasy on the internet. The worldview is similar to the real world, except that strange phenomena called Ghost Stories exist, but are not officially recognized. The government, concerned about social unrest, and companies, wanting to keep corporate secrets quiet, investigate these phenomena in secret. Even so, because anyone, including normal civilians, can enter ghost stories (on purpose or by accident), there are still dark rumors and stories of evil going around the general public. The Darkness Exploration Records is an open source wiki where anyone can participate by creating text-based stories.

=== Ghost Story ===
Ghost Stories are alternate spaces based on urban legends. By alternate space, it means that, aside from how it is visibly different from the normal world you live in, when you enter a ghost story in DER universe, all data transmission and communication with the 'real' world becomes impossible. Although horror stories and urban legends are well known among normal civilians, the existence of Ghost Stories as alternate space is not common knowledge.

=== Forces ===
There are three major forces involved with Ghost Stories, each having their own view, purpose, and classification:

Baekilmong Co.
Outwardly posing as a pharmaceutical company, they regularly send their employees into Ghost Stories to harvest a substance called Dream Essence. They refer to Ghost Stories as Darkness and officially classified them into S~F grades based on risks and difficulties. The identification code takes the pattern of Qterw-(Grade)-(Number).

Supernatural Disaster Management Bureau.
A secret government agency hidden from normal civilians under the Ministry Of Environment. They enter Ghost Stories to save trapped civilians and aim to eliminate Ghost Stories if possible. ~~However, they secretly own some Ghost Stories to 'punish bad people'.~~ They refer to Ghost Stories as Supernatural Phenomena, or Supernatural Disasters for those with casualties, and classify them according to risk. The identification code pattern is XXXXPSYA.(Year).(One Syllable)XX

Church Of The Luminous Unknown
Also known as the "Nameless Religion." They are a cult-like religious group that worship a deity by the name of "Ireum-nim" (lit. Name) and believe that, by cultivating ghost stories and the suffering they cause properly, they will gain the right to be chosen and 'saved' by Ireum-nim. Ghost Stories are called Power, given hierarchy according to degree of danger, and divided into six detailed denominations according to the branch (type) of power.

Alien Union
The Alien Union, also translated as the Coalition or Collective is a group of humanoid lizard-like aliens, they appear as humanoids with the head of a lizard with large eyes. The color of their scales can vary. When viewed by humans they appear as very conventionally attractive people. They also possess strength much greater than an average humans. Most of the aliens seem to regard themselves not as individuals but as parts of a whole and share a hive-mind.

Cheerful Research Institute
The Cheerful Research Institute (KR: 유쾌연구소; RR: Yukwae Yeonguso) also translated as the Fun or the Gaiety Research Institute is a strange group that created toy-themed Ghost Stories. The size, number of members, and purpose are all unknown.

== Characters ==
Kim Soleum
Kim Soleum (김솔음; Gim Soleum) is the main character of the novel. He entered the worldview of the Darkness Exploration Records after receiving a Real Goods Box Set from the official pop-up event. He initially worked in the Field Exploration Team of Daydream Inc..

Baek Saheon
Baek Saheon (백사헌; Baek Saheon) is a member of Field Exploration Team Group F. He joined the company in the same batch as Kim Soleum and the two were roommates in the company’s dorm. A seemingly normal person revealed to be psychotic, someone who'd assure their own survival at any cost.

Go Yeongeun
Go Yeongeun (고영은; Go Yeongeun) is a regular employee in the Field Exploration Team Group R. Among Kim Soleum's peers, she is the most trustworthy person, both in personality and intelligence. She studied medicine in college but switched majors midway.

Eun Haje
Eun Haje (은하제; Eun Haje) is a member of Field Exploration Team Group D when Kim Soleum first joined them. A cold-looking woman with short blue hair and grayish mint eyes. She has a cool and easygoing personality and takes care of her juniors in Group D.

Lee Jaheon
Lee Jaheon (이자헌; I Jaheon) is the leader of Field Exploration Team Group D known for his inhuman strength and short words. He's described as one of the most well-known employees of Daydream Inc. in Darkness Exploration Records.

Braun
Braun (브라운; Beuraun) is the host of the Tuesday Talk Show Ghost Story and a 'Good Friend' of Kim Soleum. Described to have a human-like body with a cathode ray tube television in place of his head. He has a huge body and long legs, wears a nice brown three-piece suit, black lace-up shoes.

J3
The head of Daydream Inc. Security Team 3. Before he got contaminated by wolf-like monster, he was a manager in Field Operations Team and the team leader of Group B. Described to be a tall man with a low voice, light hair and a slender build with a blank face that looks almost perpetually tired. He likes donuts and harbors some fondness or affection towards Kim Soleum, going so far as to politely threaten Kwak Jekang with a brutal death. Also referred to as Jay.

Agent Choi
Agent Choi is an agent of the Supernatural Disaster Management Agency from Hyunmu Team 1 which works in the Dispatch & Rescue section. Described to have a neat appearance, similar to that of a salaryman, though he has a conspicuous scar on his neck.

Ryu Jaekwan
An agent (also referred to as Agent Bronze) of the Supernatural Disaster Management Agency under Hyunmu Team 1 who encounters Kim Soleum several times. As a textbook civil servant, he thinks that Kim Soleum is a person with a sense of justice and kindness and thus good person, so he thinks of him highly.

For further information on notable characters, please read the novel and/or the webtoon.

== Media ==
=== Web novel ===
The Korean webnovel by Baek Deok-su was first pre-serialized on Kakaopage from October 4, 2026 with an initial release of around 60 chapters. Afterwards, the official launch date was confirmed as November 13, 2024, and the new cover was revealed. It is serialized 5 times a week, Mondays to Fridays at 6:00 PM Korean Standard Time excluding breaks. It has recorded approximately 350 million views as of July, 2026. In 2025, the webnovel ranked first in the annual rankings for all genres on Kakaopage.

The work is currently undergoing serialization on Kakaopage.

=== Webtoon ===
There is an ongoing webtoon adaptation of the work, illustrated by Ssyung-Nyung (@todac_s) under CARROTOON Studios which launched on Kakaopage on June 5, 2026. Released initially with 20 episodes, it is now serialized weekly on Fridays at 6 PM Korean Standard Time apart from breaks. It accumulated 1 million views within the first two hours of its release, a cumulative of 6.5 million views and within the day and 12.3 million views and 32,000 comments as of 16 June 2026. It also accumulated the highest transaction volume for a webtoon in a day.

The work is currently undergoing serialization on Kakaopage.
