= Binge-watching =

Practice of watching television for a long time span in one sitting or session

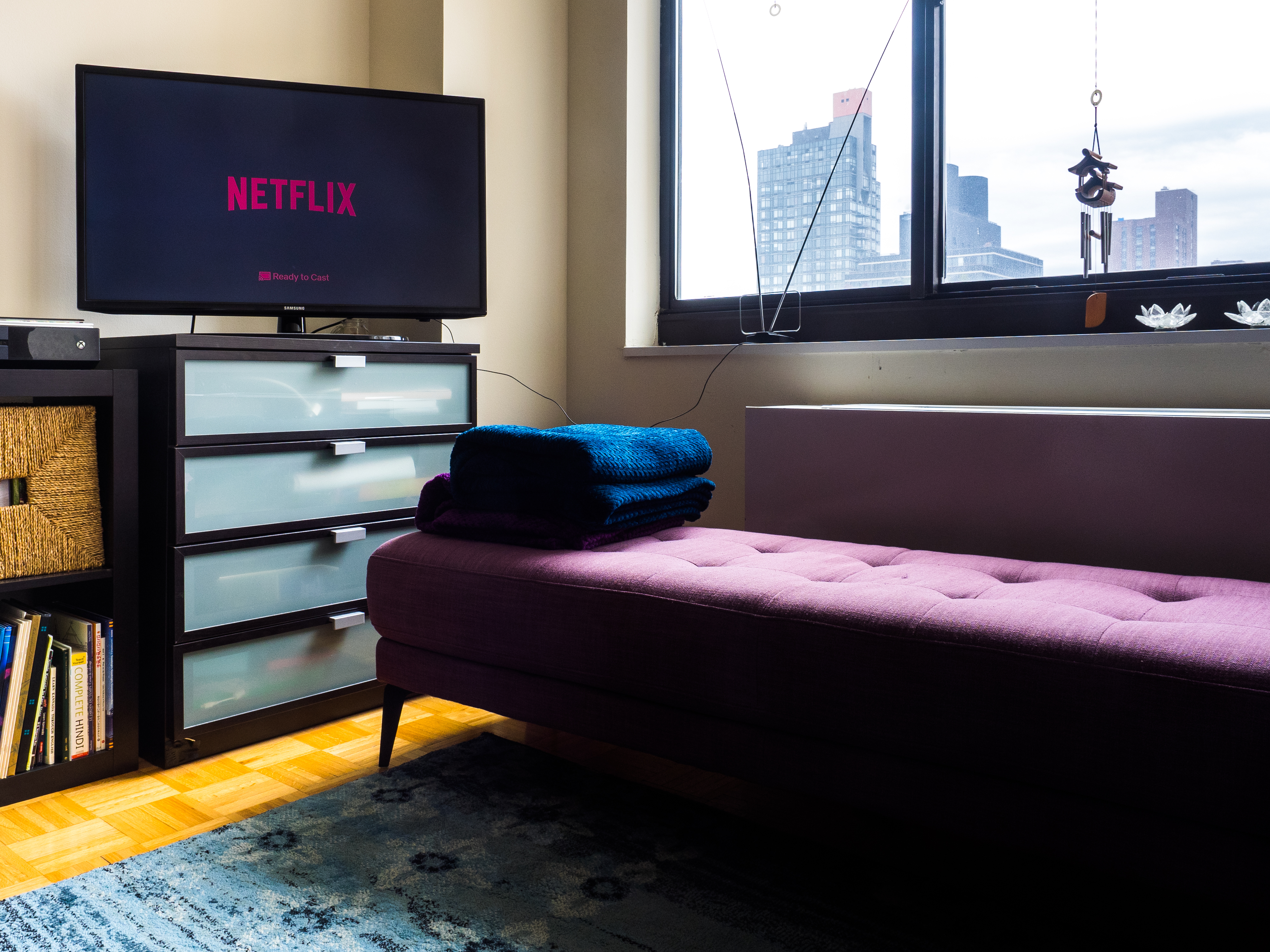
Netflix loaded on a TV in a Manhattan apartment

Binge-watching (also called binge-viewing) is the practice of watching entertainment or informational content for a prolonged time span, usually a single television show.

== Statistics ==
Binge-watching overlaps with marathon viewing which places more emphasis on stamina and less on self-indulgence. In a survey conducted by Netflix in February 2014, 73% of people define binge-watching as "watching between 2–6 episodes of the same TV show in one sitting". Some researchers have argued that binge-watching should be defined based on the context and the actual content of the TV show. Others suggested that what is normally called binge-watching in fact refers to more than one type of TV viewing experience. They proposed that the notion of binge-watching should be expanded to include both the prolonged sit (watching 3 or more episodes in a row, in one sitting) and the accelerated consumption of an entire season (or seasons) of a show, one episode at a time, over several days.

Binge-watching as an observed cultural phenomenon has become popular with the rise of video streaming services in the 2006–2007 time frame, such as Netflix, Amazon Prime Video, and Hulu through which the viewer can watch television shows and movies on-demand. For example, 61% of the Netflix survey participants said they binge-watch regularly. Recent research based on video-on-demand data from major American video streaming providers shows that over 64% of the customers binged-watched once during a year.

== History ==
The first uses of "binge" in reference to television appeared in Variety under the byline of TV industry reporter George Rosen, in 1948, according to archival research by media scholar Emil Steiner. The term "TV binge" first appeared in a American newspaper on July 27, 1952, in the Atlanta Journal-Constitution. Sports editor Ed Danforth used the term to describe a Bob Hope–Bing Crosby telethon to raise money for the U.S. Olympic team. While the term "TV marathon" was used frequently in the 1950s, "TV binge" rarely appeared in English language periodicals from 1952-1986 and was most commonly used as a side effect of technological improvements in broadcast television around multi-game sporting events such as the NCAA Division I men's basketball tournament, the Olympics, and the World Cup. An October 1970 Vogue trendspotting feature described how people were talking about "the television binge of sports with more networks finding live action healthier than canned plots."

Japanese manga magazine Weekly Shōnen Jump, founded in 1968, developed a successful formula of publishing individual manga chapters and then compiling them into separate standalone tankōbon volumes that could be "binged" all at once. This Jump formula produced major Japanese pop culture hits such as Dragon Ball (1984 debut), One Piece (1997 debut) and Naruto (1999 debut). According to Matt Alt of The New Yorker, "Jump presaged the way the world consumes streaming entertainment today."

The practice of binge-watching was previously called marathon-watching. Early examples of this practice include marathon viewing sessions of imported Japanese anime shows on VHS tapes in anime fandom communities during the late 1970s to 1980s, and Nickelodeon's Nick at Nite which broadcast multiple episodes from Donna Reed and Route 66 in July 1985.

The first printed usage of the term "binge viewing" appeared in a December 1986 Philadelphia Inquirer last-minute Christmas list by TV Critic Andy Wickstrom who suggested Scotch tape to mend worn VCR tape if "you're a confirmed weekday time-shifter, saving up the soap operas for weekend binge viewing." This first use of "binge viewing" as a gerund predated "binge-watching" uses by nearly a decade. The first known usage of binge-watching as an active verb is credited to GregSerl, an X-Files Usenet newsgroup commenter. On December 20, 1998, he posted a mock questionnaire that asked X-Files fans "Do you ever binge watch (marathon)? Despite that usage, Steiner argues that "binge viewing" is a far closer synonym to binge-watching than marathon.

The usage of the word "binge-watching" was popularized with the advent of on-demand viewing and online streaming. In 2013, the word burst into mainstream use to describe the Netflix practice of releasing seasons of its original programs simultaneously, as opposed to the industry standard model of releasing episodes on a weekly basis.

In November 2015, the Collins English Dictionary chose the word "binge-watch" as the word of the year.

At the beginning of the 2020 pandemic, there was a noticeable surge of Netflix binge watching. Lockdown made it so that those stuck at home turned towards spending their time catching up and re-watching television series.

In a comparison study, Bridget Rubenking observed that traditional appointment viewing had decreased from 2015 to 2020. Rubenking noted that all three types of viewing, binge watching, serial viewing, and appointment viewing, were at an all-time high during the start of the pandemic. These circumstances contributed to a rise in the number of individuals who adopted these habits.

== Cultural impact ==
Actor Kevin Spacey used the 2013 MacTaggart Lecture to implore television executives to give audiences "what they want when they want it. If they want to binge, then we should let them binge". He claimed that high-quality stories will retain audience's attention for hours on end, and may reduce piracy, although millions still download content illegally. Binge-watching "complex, quality TV" such as The Wire and Breaking Bad has been likened to reading more than one chapter of a novel in one sitting, and is viewed by some as a "smart, contemplative way" of watching TV. A recent study found that while binge-watching, people feel "transported" into the world of the show, which increases their viewing enjoyment, makes them binge-watch more frequently and for longer.

ITV Director of Television Peter Fincham warned that binge-watching erodes the "social value" of television as there are fewer opportunities to anticipate future episodes and discuss them with friends. Nevertheless, research has shown that heavy binge-watching does not necessarily mean less social engagement. One study found quite the opposite, reporting that heavy binge-watchers spent more time in interactions with friends and family on a daily basis than non-binge-watchers. Heavy binge-watchers are used by others as sources of opinion about what shows to watch and they often engage in conversations about TV shows both offline and online.

Research by Alessandro Gabbiadini et al. explores psychological factors contributing to binge-watching, highlighting loneliness, escapism, and identification with media characters as key motivators. The study suggests that viewers turn to extended series consumption as a means of escaping negative emotions or forging parasocial relationships with characters. These tendencies are amplified by the episodic nature of series, which facilitates prolonged engagement and emotional investment, distinguishing binge-watching from traditional film-viewing experiences.

Kristina Šekrst explores why binge-watching TV shows is psychologically easier than watching long films. Šekrst highlights that the episodic structure of television series, combined with natural breaks between episodes, provides a sense of accomplishment and refreshes viewer attention, making prolonged viewing sessions more manageable. She contrasts this with films, which often demand continuous engagement without breaks, leading to cognitive fatigue. This episodic pacing aligns with contemporary viewing habits, where streaming platforms encourage binge-watching by auto-playing the next episode, fostering a seamless, immersive experience.

Research conducted at the University of Texas at Austin found binge watching television is correlated with depression, loneliness, self-regulation deficiency, and obesity. "Even though some people argue that binge-watching is a harmless addiction, findings from our study suggest that binge-watching should no longer be viewed this way," the authors conclude. Cases of people being treated for "binge watching addiction" have already been reported.

Research published by media scholar, Dr. Anne Sweet, Ph.D., underlines that binge-watching is a form of compulsive consumption, similar to binge-eating, or binge-drinking, and that due to its addictive aspects, it could even represent a form of TV addiction. These findings were problematized by Pittman and Steiner (2019), who found that "the degree to which an individual pays attention to a show may either increase or decrease subsequent regret, depending on the motivation for binge-watching."

Research conducted by media scholar Dr. Emil Steiner, Ph.D., at Rowan University isolated five motivations for binge-watching (catching up, relaxation, sense of completion, cultural inclusion, and improved viewing experience). The author concludes that while compulsiveness is possible, most binge-viewers have an ambivalent relationship with the nascent techno-cultural behavior. Furthermore, he argues that the negotiation of control in binge-watching is changing our understanding of television culture.

Research conducted by Technicolor lab in 2016 found that a binge-watching session does increase the probability of another binge-watching session in the near future. In the meantime, the majority of people will not immediately have another binge-watching session. This indicates that binge-watching is not a consistent behavior for real-world video-on-demand consumers.

Viewing an entire season of a show within 24 hours of its release has become common. According to a 2018 survey of adult TV watchers, 29% reported having done so. Among those aged 18–29, the number increases to 51%.

Conversely, some streaming service original shows may be negatively affected if viewers do not binge watch-them. Many viewers of the Netflix original series The Sandman watched episodes more slowly, but Netflix measures viewer engagement only over the first 28 days after release. This led to uncertainty over whether the series would be renewed for a second season, though it eventually was renewed.

=== In popular culture ===
In July 2013, Entertainment Weekly's website listed the top five television series suited for the new entertainment-consumption phenomenon of binge-watching, which has emerged as viewers have chosen to watch whole seasons of TV series, or even whole series, at a sitting.

It has also been subjected to parody as the website CollegeHumor released a 2014 comedic PSA titled "The Dangers of Binge-Watching".

In March 2020, memes surrounding binge watching while stuck in lockdown circulated the internet. The collective experience of living in a pandemic led to a number of people online to indulge in sharing memes.

== Artistic and narrative developments ==
As binge-watching became widespread, some critics began highlighting narrative fatigue and a growing sense of wasted time. In response, shorter and mobile-native formats have emerged. The Duanju, which originated in China, offers tightly condensed narratives in episodes of 1 to 3 minutes, bridging serialized storytelling with fragmented attention spans.

== Attentiveness ==
A 2019 study by Dr. Matthew Pittman of the University of Tennessee and Dr. Emil Steiner of Rowan University examined how attentiveness affected viewer experience and post-binge regret. "The survey (N = 800) determined that the degree to which an individual pays attention to a show may either increase or decrease subsequent regret, depending on the motivation for binge-watching." But simply watching shows that demand more attention is not enough to moderate post-binge regret. Their subsequent research (Pittman and Steiner, 2021) found that viewers who planned their binge-watching ahead of time were more likely to choose shows that aligned with their motives for watching — relaxing comedies, riveting dramas, nostalgic favorites. Such planning improved "viewer engagement, resulting in improved emotional outcomes."

Within the television industry, speculation emerged in the early 2020s that binge watching a new series could make a series less memorable in the long term compared to shows released on a more traditional schedule; various streaming providers, led by Disney+, have had success releasing some of their original series on a weekly schedule, in contrast to the Netflix model which is most aggressive among the streaming providers in releasing episodes all at once. Showrunners have increasingly requested that their programs not be released in bulk as a creative decision.

Mareike Jenner makes note of streaming services like Netflix using algorithms to recommend relevant content to viewers. Algorithms allow streaming services to personalize the user's experience by suggesting similar series to the one they just watched.

Binge watching can be attributed to "the bored body problem," which Tina Kendall explains as the phenomenon of individuals feeling the need to feel engaged. Individuals who feel as if they have limited freedom or choice see binge watching as an activity to participate in. Kendall emphasizes that lockdown has heightened the need to get back into a rhythm as quarantine has left people feeling uncertain about how they should organize their day.

== Mood-regulation ==
Binge watching can be related to Zillmann's Mood Management Theory, which may account binge-watching as an emotional regulation process. In line with the mood management theory, media content selection could be driven by the purpose of mood regulation. Most people attempt to regulate their moods and shift it to a more positive one through television shows. Related viewing practices, while distinct from binge-watching, include Comfort television, in which viewers repeatedly engage with familiar content for relaxation or emotional regulation. However, such an effect proves to be dependent on individual self-control. Ego-depleted individuals (i.e., individuals presenting lower available cognitive resources to exert self-control) demonstrate tendencies to negatively evaluate entertainment use as a procrastination form, which may elicit feelings of guilt and negatively impact stress recovery and well-being. Therein, the results of mood-regulation through content binging is dictated through individual self-control.

== Effects on sleep ==
A 2017 study linked binge-watching to a poorer sleep quality, increased insomnia and fatigue. In fact, binge-watching could lead to an increased cognitive alertness, therefore impacting sleep. The results showed that 98 percent of binge-watchers were more likely to have poor sleep quality, were more alert before sleep and reported more fatigue. Authors also emphasize that findings have been inconsistent in sleep research regarding the negative associations between sleep and television viewing, and that it should be distinguished from binge-watching.

Consuming television content at 'binge' levels has been found to create a negative effect on sleep cycles as a whole. Binge-watching may create feelings of regret, which may extending into the early hours of the morning, impacting on sleep and the day ahead. Additionally, individuals displaying binge-watching tendencies are more likely to suffer from insomnia, poorer sleep quality and sleep deprivation.

== Personality traits ==
A study from 2019 found that there were four profiles that binge-watchers fit into. The first is avid binge-watchers, who have high motivation for watching TV, but also have a strong sense of urgency and emotional reactions. The second is recreational binge-watchers, who have the least motivation and do not spend as much time watching TV. The third profile is, unregulated binge-watchers, who have the highest motivation to watch TV, which is driven by their coping mechanisms. Studies show they also "display the highest impulsivity among the binge-watchers of all types. The last profile is, regulated binge-watchers, who also are motivated by emotional enrichment, they don't react as emotionally, and aren't impulsive people.

An other study from 2020 outlines the type of people who are most likely to partake in binge-watching. "[They] are more neurotic, less agreeable, less conscientious, and less open to new experience." They also found that people who binge-watch often are more likely feel sad, anxious, stress and have low self-esteem. The study also finds that people who binge-watch often use "avoidance and emotional coping, instead of task-oriented coping."

== Risks ==
Studies have shown that prolonged binge-watching can lead to addictive characteristics. The type of instant gratification that it produces can be similar to that of gambling or computer/social media addiction. People who binge-watch regularly usually use it as an escape from reality and to take away from loneliness or boredom. Another study found correlations between binge-watching and procrastinating. Both of these come with warning signs such as, "loss of self-control, urgency, regret, neglect of duties, negative social and health consequences, lying, or even symptoms of withdrawal such as anxiety, nervousness, rage, and concentration difficulties."

To the distributor, releasing a full season of episodes en masse to encourage binge-watching raises the risk of a phenomenon where a casual viewer will subscribe to the service, binge-watch the show they want to see, then cancel their subscription. In an effort to retain subscribers longer-term, Netflix in 2024 began splitting the seasons of its marquee original series in half, while rival streaming services had long been moving toward a model more closely resembling the traditional television model of one new episode a week.

== Effects on advertising ==
A 2016 study found that, overall, viewers who tend to binge-watch are less responsive to advertising than viewers who do not. The effectiveness of advertising declines the longer a viewing session goes on. Researchers attribute this phenomenon to the disruption caused by ads. Binge-watchers want to remain immersed in what they are watching. They do not want to be forced back into the real world.

In 2019, Hulu introduced a new ad format for binge-watchers. A brand runs ads during the first and second episodes of a binge-watching session that include jokes and references to binge-watching. Before the third episode, the brand rewards binge-watchers by running an ad that features a special promotion or announcing they will be able to watch the next episode without commercial interruptions.

Lee Rainie of the Pew Research Center stated that:

"Although watching television shows or movies on cable is becoming less and less common in our generation, several studies have come out discussing the effects that fast food advertising has especially on the younger audience. When binge watching we come across several different advertisements, and we underestimate the impact and significant effect they have on us."

A study on the "Receptivity to television fast-food restaurant marketing and obesity among U.S youth" studied the extent to which fast food advertisements have played a role in the rates of obesity in the United States, where the results found that there was a significant correlation between increased viewing time and receptivity to fast food marketing. The study states that $1.8 billion have been put towards food and beverage marketing directed specifically towards children and adolescents; demonstrating that big corporations know there are certain marketing tactics that have been known to work on younger audiences. There is, of course, a significant ethical concern when it comes to the tailoring of fast food marketing towards children and adolescents as it comprises their health, as many studies have shown. It is extremely important to recognize the receptivity that we have towards what we watch, as this allows us to be more aware of how what we are watching affects us. In learning to do this, young audiences can be more conscious of where their wants or cravings are stemming from, and how to possibly limit them if they are compromising their health and lifestyle.

== See also ==
- Snack culture
- Golden Age of Television (2000s–present)
- Hate-watching
