= Web novels in South Korea =

Type of web novels made in South Korea

Cover of The Remarried Empress, written by South Korean author Alphatart

Web novels in South Korea (Korean: 웹소설; Hanja: 웹小說; RR: Wepsoseol; "web novel; web fiction") are novels first released on the web and typically published in serialized form on online platforms. Within the e-publishing industry, web novels are a core form of content driving the e-book market. Just as webtoons (online comics) expanded in South Korea in the early 2000s, web novels have grown rapidly since the 2010s. In particular, the web novel market has attracted growing attention due to the potential for web novels to be adapted into other media, such as television dramas.

== Etymology ==
The term wepsoseol (Korean: 웹소설), or wep soseol (Korean: 웹 소설), comes from the word wep (Korean: 웹), which is the Korean reading of the English word Web, and the word soseol (Korean: 소설; Hanja: 小說; MR: sosŏl), which is the Korean reading of the Chinese word xiǎoshuō (Chinese: 小說), which in China, Korea, and Japan refers to both novels and prose fiction of any length.

== History ==
Web novels in South Korea were previously called "internet novels" (인터넷 소설; inteonet soseol) and "online novels" (온라인 소설; ollain soseol). The term "web novel" (wepsoseol) became widely used in South Korea after the launch of Naver Web Novel (네이버웹소설; Neibeowebsoseol) in 2013. The term is used in both industry and academia.

South Korean web novels began to spread in the late 1990s through now-defunct dial-up PC communication platforms including "Chollian", "Nownuri" and "HiTEL". These platforms hosted what are considered the first generation of Korean fantasy novels.

Representative works include:

- Exorcism Chronicles (퇴마록; 退魔錄; Toemarok) (1993)
- The Legend of Maian (마이언 전기; Maieon jeongi) (1995)
- The Raising Falcon (비상하는 매; Bisanghaneun mae) (1996)
- Dragon Raja (드래곤 라자; Deuraegon raja) (1997)
- Karsearin (카르세아린; Kareusearin) (1998)
- Dragon's Temple (용의 신전; Yongui sinjeon) (1998)
- Mookhyang (묵향; 墨香; Mukhyang) (1998)
- The Stone of Days (세월의 돌; Seworui dol) (1998)

After the widespread adoption of the Internet in the late 1990s, earlier online platforms disappeared, and online novels became increasingly popular. Since 2000, social and economic instability, including the 1997 Asian financial crisis and the turn of the century, contributed to the rise of amateur writers and the growing popularity of genre fiction over literary fiction.

Web novels also gained attention internationally, though terminology varies. In the United States, they are generally called web fiction while in China they are referred to as Internet literature (Chinese: 网络文学; pinyin: wǎngluò wénxué). Prominent authors from this period include Gwiyeoni, whose works, such as My Sassy Girl by Kim Ho-sik (김호식) and He Was Cool, were adapted into comics and films.

After the economic crisis, many book rental stores emerged in South Korea. Genre novels serialized on the Internet were often published in print and distributed through these rental stores. However, the market for book rental shops was short-lived due to the emergence of competing distribution channels. Web novels also began to adopt paid distribution models. In April 2007, the e-book company Booktopia (now defunct) launched a genre novel website called Waki. In 2008, BookCube launched an e-book store. Both platforms used a per-part payment model. Joara, a popular serialization platform, also introduced paid content at this time, but it was initially unsuccessful. It introduced its "Premium" section in 2011, which was not profitable until 2014.

Meanwhile, the e-book market continued to expand. In January 2013, Naver launched its Naver Web Novel platform, which had a significant influence on the market. Works previously referred to as “internet novels” or “online novels” came to be known as “web novels.” In February of the same year, Kakao Page launched and later became a leading platform in the genre web novel market.

Since October 2022, services such as YONDER have provided official English translations of Korean web novels. Prior to this, many piracy sites distributed unauthorized translations to meet demand from non-Korean speakers. However, South Korea’s Ministry of Culture has taken a hard stance against illegal distributors to uphold copyright protections.

== Features ==
=== Web based system ===
Web novels are produced, distributed, and consumed online. This has brought significant changes to the traditional publishing industry, as web-based platforms that previously had little influence have become increasingly prominent in the web novel market. In addition, production, distribution, and consumption often occur almost simultaneously. Digital payment systems have also made access easier, allowing readers to purchase episodes, typically priced at around ₩100 each.

=== Serialization ===
Serialization is a key feature of web novels, as it enables gradual commercialization and encourages ongoing reader engagement. It is important for authors to know how to structure episode to end on exciting moments and cliffhangers. Continuity between episodes is also an important factor in encouraging readers to continue to the next installment.

=== Interaction ===
Interaction with readers through comments is an important component of web novels. Authors can review comments and views counts to determine reader preferences. However, this dynamic can place pressure on writers and may affect their creative process. This represents a shift in the traditional fixed relationship between authors and readers and creates new literary possibilities .

=== Extensibility ===
Web novels have strong potential for adaption into other forms of media. Their fast-paced narratives and episodic structure make them immersive and relatively easy to adapt into visual formats such as television dramas. In China, web novels are increasingly recognized as valuable intellectual property that can be developed into various media such as webtoons, movies, and video games. Many works adapted from original web novels have achieved significant popularity.

== Platforms ==
=== Joara ===
"Serialist" (시리얼리스트; Silieolliseuteu) was launched in November 2000, and "Ujoa" (유조아; Yujoa), was launched in March 2001. The web novel Invisible Dragon (투명드래곤; Tumyeongdeuraegon) (2002) attracted significant attention. In June 2003, "Joara" (조아라) was officially established.

Joara is South Korea's largest web novel platform, with approximately 140,000 writers. It hosts an average of 2,400 serialized works per day and a total of about 420,000 works. The company operated at a loss for its first eight years but began generating profits in 2009. By 2015, it reported sales of ₩12.5 billion. As of 2016, Joara had approximately 1.1 million members and averaged 8.6 million daily users.

Because Joara’s user base has a relatively balanced gender distribution, both fantasy and romance genres are popular. The top 10 works in the “Noblesse” and “Premium” categories are dominated by these genres, while parody and BL genres are popular in the free series category.

=== Munpia ===
"Go! Murim" was launched in 2002 by writers of martial arts novels such as Geumgang, who is currently CEO Kim Hwan-cheol. The site initially focused on the martial arts genre and attracted an older audience. It later expanded to include fantasy and changed its name to "Gomofan." In 2006, the site was renamed again as Munpia (문피아) and in 2013 started a paid service.

As of 2016, Munpia had approximately 450,000 members, 500,000 daily visitors, and 31,000 active writers. The platform hosts about 60,000 titles, 700,000 serialized work, 20,000 exclusive works, and more than 2,700 new works every month.

In May 2021, Naver partnered with CJ ENM, a subsidiary of CJ Group, to acquire Munpia Inc., which had become South Korea's third largest web-novel platform.

=== Naver Web Novel (and SERIES) ===
Naver Web Novel (네이버웹소설; Neibeowebsoseol) is a web novel platform operated by Naver, South Korea’s largest search engine company. The service was launched on January 15, 2013.

According to a Naver press release from January 2016, more than five million users accessed Naver Web Novel at least once per month, indicating its widespread popularity. Among its officially serialized authors, 26 earned more than ₩100 million annually, with the highest-earning author reportedly earning ₩470 million in 2018.

Naver Web Novel differs from other platforms in its presentation format, notably by including small character illustrations at the beginning of dialogue. This feature allows readers to identify speakers visually without requiring contextual cues.

In 2018, Naver reorganized its web novel services under the Naver SERIES platform (Korean: 네이버 시리즈; RR: Neibeo Silijeu and has since focused on expanding and marketing this service. As part of this restructuring, Naver introduced a revised monetization model, including the “Free for You” system, which allows users to access certain web novels for free after a waiting period.

=== KakaoPage ===
KakaoPage is a digital content platform operated by Kakao, launched on April 9, 2013. Initially, the service did not focus primarily on web novels or webtoons. Instead, it was designed as an open marketplace where developers could freely upload and distribute various types of mobile content. However, the platform struggled to gain widespread adoption in its early stages, largely due to limited user awareness.

Beginning on April 21, 2014, KakaoPage introduced free access to its webtoon and web novel services. Building on the popularity of works such as Legendary Moonlight Sculptor (2007), the platform attracted a large user base through active marketing strategies, including promotional campaigns offering in-app items to Kakao Talk users. It has since become one of the major platforms in the South Korean digital publishing market.

KakaoPage’s webtoon and web novel offerings include serialized works managed by the platform, as well as titles provided by various publishers. Its services include the “Waiting for Free” model, which allows users to access the next episode without charge after a certain period has passed since viewing the previous episode. Unlike platforms that allow individual creators to upload content directly, such as Naver N Store (now integrated into Naver SERIES), KakaoPage does not accept uploads from independent writers and only distributes content through partner companies.

=== Ridi ===
Since 2017, Ridi Corporation has expanded its content offerings by providing web novels across its various products.

== Genres ==
The genres of web novels are diverse and rapidly evolving, but they can generally be categorized into romance, fantasy, martial arts, and modern genres. Among these, romance is the most widely produced and consumed genre.

In the case of Naver, a total of 25,542 web novels were available on N Store as of August 2015. Of these, romance accounted for the largest share with 13,164 works (64.08%). Science fiction and fantasy ranked second with 3,540 works (17.23%), followed by martial arts with 2,420 works (11.78%), mystery with 865 works (4.36%), and light novels with 238 works (1.16%).

More recently, romance fantasy has gained prominence. Introduced on Naver in April 2017, romance fantasy refers to a genre that combines elements of romance and fantasy. While traditional fantasy often centers on heroic adventure narratives, romance fantasy places greater emphasis on romantic storylines.

Game web novels have also been increasing in popularity. These works typically incorporate game elements such as quests, items, and non-player characters (NPCs) into their narratives. Game web novels often overlap with fantasy and have expanded their readership, particularly among younger audiences familiar with the game.

== Market ==
The main participants in the web novel industry are platforms, content providers (CPs), and writers. Platforms distribute web novels to readers by sourcing content from both writers and CPs. Writers are typically recruited through direct submissions or by participating in contests hosted on the platforms.

CPs acquire web novels from writers and adapt them into various formats. They generate revenue by publishing serialized web novels on platforms, as well as by producing print editions of completed works and developing related merchandise.

Romance accounts for 64% of web novels, and 95% of romance readers are women. In addition, readers in their 30s and 40s made up 64% of web novel users as of 2015.

=== Sales ===
The web novel market, valued at ₩10 billion in 2013, is estimated to have grown to ₩400 billion by 2018, representing a fortyfold increase over five years. In 2019, the market size exceeded ₩500 billion.

== Media franchise ==
Web novels have significant potential as source material for other forms of content. They are particularly valuable for testing the marketability of animations, films, and television dramas, which are relatively high-risk investments, because web novels typically require lower initial costs. As a result, the market value of web novels can increase when their potential for adaptation and cross-media use is taken into account, beyond their value as standalone works.

== See also ==
- East Asian definition of the novel
- Korean literature
  - South Korean literature
  - Korean literature in translation
- Genre fiction
  - Light novel
  - Wuxia
  - LitRPG
- Fan fiction
- Electronic literature
  - Web fiction
    - Blog fiction
    - Cell phone novel
  - Webcomic
    - Webtoon
- Culture of South Korea
- Korean Wave
- Snack culture
