= He Was Cool =

- He Was Cool poster
- Hangul: 그 놈은 멋있었다
- RR: Geu nomeun meosisseotda
- MR: Kŭ nomŭn mŏsissŏtta
- Directed by: Lee Hwan-kyung
- Screenplay by: Lee Hwan-kyung; Kim Young-seok
- Story by: Guiyeoni
- Based on: He Was Cool by Guiyeoni
- Produced by: Kwak Jung-hwan
- Starring: Song Seung-heon; Jeong Da-bin
- Cinematography: Lee Kang-min
- Edited by: Kim Sun-min
- Music by: Ahn Jeong-hun
- Distributed by: Hapdong Films
- Release date: July 23, 2004
- Running time: 113 minutes
- Country: South Korea
- Language: Korean

He Was Cool (Korean: 그 놈은 멋있었다; RR: Geu nomeun meosisseotda; lit. 'That Guy was Cool') is a 2004 South Korean film based on the same-titled 2001 web novel written by Guiyeoni. The film was released in South Korean cinemas on July 23, 2004, and was the 35th most attended film of the year with 800,000 admissions.

== Synopsis ==
The story is about a cheerful high school student named Han Ye-won (Jung Da-bin). She is a sweet, clumsy and warm girl. On the other hand, there is Ji Eun-sung (Song Seung-heon), a student from a vocational school and a well-known bully. He is hot-tempered and rude but deep inside he longs to be loved.

One day, clumsily, Ye-won leaves a message on the school website to reply to Eun-sung's impolite message. She is shocked when someone calls her cell phone and threatens her. Gradually, her best friend, Lee Kyung-won, tells her who Eun-sung is. He sends Ye-won a text message: He will wait for her in front of the main gate. She is so scared that she and Kyung-won decide to jump over the school wall. Unfortunately, the moment Ye-won jumps, Eun-sung is standing exactly at the other side of wall. She falls on him and their lips meet accidentally. Raising his voice, Eun-sung asks her to take responsibility; she is astonished. His friend explains that Eun-sung has never even held hands with a girl. Since she is the first girl who kissed him, as a consequence, she must marry him.

Events happen quickly. At the beginning, Ye-won does not have any feelings for Eun-sung. She even rejects his invitation to come to his birthday party. Unknowingly, Eun-sung has fallen in love with her; but he is not the kind of guy who knows how to express his feelings. He is jealous when Ye-won is approached by other guys but he does not know how to be with someone he loves.

Although he is rude and bad-tempered, Eun-sung always pardons Ye-won's faults and clumsiness. However, he can't bear it when he finds out that Ye-won went out with Kim Han-sung (Lee Ki-woo), an older student whom he hates. Broken-hearted, Eun-sung decides to leave Korea and follow his mother to the USA.

A year later Ye-won is seen with Han-sung, discussing whether she is scared for her college entrance exams. During the listening portion of her exams, a quote from Romeo and Juliet is mentioned, making Ye-won recall the memory of her and Eun-sung in the park where they promised that no matter what, they would reunite in front of the telephone booth at the first snowfall. Ye-won stops what she is doing and runs to the park. She waits there as the scene rolls back to the fantasy she had a year ago and she starts to cry because Eun-sung is not there. As she turns around, a rabbit is hopping towards her, the same rabbit she gave to Eun-sung as a gift. She looks up and Eun-sung is there. She yells at him, saying, "Why did you leave without saying goodbye?" And Eun-sung replies, "True love requires no words." Ye-won runs to him and they embrace.

The film ends with Eun-sung's childhood memory of some opening event of an elementary school where the only kid that would kiss Eun-sung was Ye-won. An interesting aspect to this is that earlier on in the film, Ye-won uses Eun-sung's cellphone to make a mini-video of her bedroom. There she captures footage of an old photo from when she was little, showing her and a friend. It turns out that this friend is actually the little Eun-sung, hinting at the connection between the two. When Eun-sung watches the video on his cell phone towards the end of the film, he is surprised to see himself and remembers that Ye-won was that little girl.

== Cast ==
- Song Seung-heon as Ji Eun-sung
- Jeong Da-bin as Han Ye-won
- Lee Ki-woo as Kim Han-sung
- Lee Min-hyuk as Kim Seung-pyo
- Jeong Jun-ha as homeroom teacher
- Park Yoon-bae as harassing man
- Park No-shik as rabbit seller
- Ahn Hae-soo as Lee Kyung-won
- Kim Young-hoon as Kim Hyun-sung
- Kim Bo-yeon as Ye-won's mother
- Kim Kap-soo as Ye-won's father
- Kim Ji-hye as Kim Hyo-bin
- Moon Seo-yeon as kindergarten teacher
- Jung Woo as Bba-Park Yi
- Lee Jin-sung as Han Seung-pyo

== See also ==
- List of Korean-language films
- Korean cinema
- Korean Wave
