= Jung Eui-chul =

South Korean model and actor

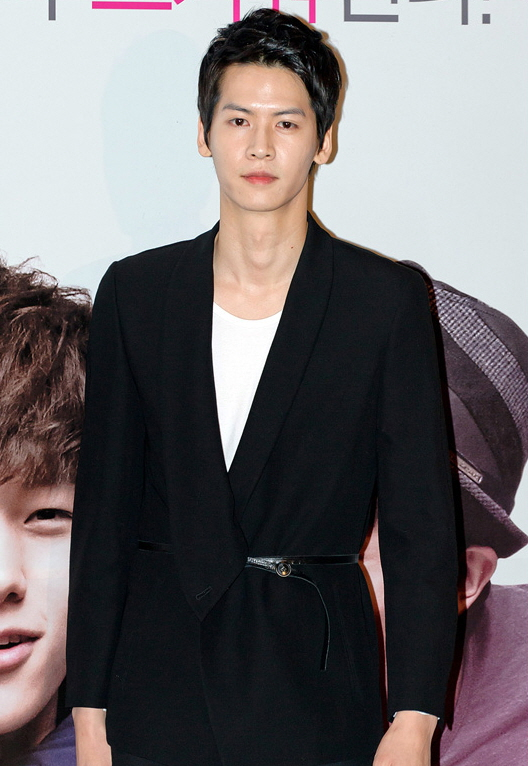
- Jung in 2012
- Born: April 19, 1985 (age 41); Seoul, South Korea
- Occupations: Actor; model
- Years active: 2005–present
- Agent(s): Clumsy Media; 2011–current
- Height: 6 ft 2 in (1.88 m)

Korean name
- Hangul: 정의철
- Hanja: 丁義澈
- RR: Jeong Uicheol
- MR: Chŏng Ŭich'ŏl

Jung Eui-chul (Korean: 정의철; born April 19, 1985) is a South Korean model and actor.

== Career ==
He made his acting debut in the drama Biscuit Teacher and Star Candy as a student and gained positive response in 2005 and later landed on many supporting roles including the award-winning films such as Five Senses of Eros and popularity based novel film Do Re Mi Fa So La Ti Do. Through his connection with actress model Kei Nangon he was signed under the same management; Clumsy Media in 2011. According to news reports they met during the final auditions for Boys Over Flowers. In the following year, he secured his Korean fan base playing as a cold attitude popular student in high school in the ratings hit drama Flower Band.

== Filmography ==
=== Dramas ===
- Vampire Prosecutor - cameo appearance (OCN, 2012)
- Flower Band (tvN, 2012)
- Boys Over Flowers (KBS2, 2009)
- Rainbow Romance (MBC, 2006)
- Hello My Teacher (SBS, 2005)

=== Film ===
- Yeosu (2011)
- Closer to Heaven (2009)
- Five Senses of Eros (2009)
- Romantic Island (2008)
- The Moonlight of Seoul (2008)
- Do Re Mi Fa So La Ti Do (2008)
