= Temptation of Wolves =

2004 film by Kim Tae-gyun

- Film poster
- Hangul: 늑대의 유혹
- Hanja: 늑대의 誘惑
- RR: Neukdaeui yuhok
- MR: Nŭktaeŭi yuhok
- Directed by: Kim Tae-kyun
- Written by: Kim Tae-kyun
- Based on: Temptation of Wolves by Guiyeoni
- Produced by: Cha Seung-jae; Noh Jong-yun; Im Choong-ryul
- Starring: Jo Han-sun; Gang Dong-won; Lee Chung-ah
- Cinematography: Jin Yong-hwan
- Edited by: Ko Im-pyo
- Music by: Lee Hoon-seok; Jung Jae-il
- Distributed by: Showbox
- Release date: July 22, 2004
- Running time: 113 minutes
- Country: South Korea
- Language: Korean

Temptation of Wolves (Korean: 늑대의 유혹; also known as Romance of Their Own or True Romance) is a 2004 South Korean romantic drama film directed by Kim Tae-kyun, and based on a web novel of the same name written by Guiyeoni. Starring Jo Han-sun, Gang Dong-won and Lee Chung-ah, the film is about an average high school girl who moves from the countryside to Seoul after her father's death only to become involved in a love triangle with the two most handsome and popular guys in town.

2,189,453 admissions made it the 9th highest grossing Korean film of 2004.

== Synopsis ==
From her appearance to her mannerisms, it is easy to tell that Jung Han-kyeong (Lee Chung-ah) is a country girl. After her father's death, she comes to Seoul to live with her mother (Kim Bo-yeon), planning to attend Kang-Shin High School. However, her life in Seoul is a series of mental and physical shocks. On the bus, a slipper is thrown randomly at her head—but her problems don't end there. The guy who threw the slipper is none other than Ban Hae-won (Jo Han-sun), the most popular guy at her school, and everywhere he steps, girls trail behind. Seeing Han-kyeong's pitiable and adorable nature, Hae-Won falls for her.

The leader of Sung-Kwon High, Kang-Shin's neighbor and rival, is named Jung Tae-sung (Gang Dong-won), and he, too, has feelings for Han-kyeong. Despite his shy, adorable face, Tae-sung has strong fists and endless obstinacy. A fight that handles both pride and love begins between the two, and neither of them is prepared to back down. But Tae-sung has a secret, one that forces him to love Han-kyeong in spite of himself, and Han-kyeong, ignorant of this, tries to do her best to be gentle with both of them. Eventually, Tae-sung leaves Han-kyeong's side, and later, Han-kyeong and Hae-won learn of his secret.

== Cast ==
- Jo Han-sun as Ban Hae-won
- Gang Dong-won as Jung Tae-sung
- Lee Chung-ah as Jung Han-kyeong
- Jung Da-hye as Da-reum
- Kwon Oh-min as Han Joo-ho
- Lee Chun-hee as Yoo-won
- Lee Ji-hee as Lee Bo-jung
- Song Chae-min as Yoo Jae-hee
- Kim Ha-eun as Lee Na-yoon
- Ahn Hyeong-jun as Kim Dae-han
- Do Yong-gu as Han-kyeong's stepfather
- Jung Hye-young as Young Han-kyeong
- Shin Tae-hoon as Young Tae-sung
- Lee Ki-hyuk as Hae-won's member
- Chun Ho-jin as Tae-sung's father
- Kim Bo-yeon as Han-kyeong's mother
- Nam Jung-hee as Han-kyeong's grandmother

== Awards and nominations ==
2004 Blue Dragon Film Awards

- Nomination – Best New Actor – Gang Dong-won
- Nomination – Best New Actor – Jo Han-sun

2004 Korean Film Awards

- Best New Actor – Gang Dong-won

2005 Grand Bell Awards

- Best New Actress – Lee Chung-ah
- Nomination – Best New Actor – Jo Han-sun
- Nomination – Best Music - Lee Hoon-seok
