= Guiyeoni =

South Korean writer

- Born: Lee Yoon-sae; 1985 (age 40–41) Jecheon, South Korea
- Notable works: Do Re Mi Fa So La Ti Do

Guiyeoni (Korean: 귀여니, born 1985) is the pen name of internet novelist Lee Yoon-sae (이윤세).

== Career ==
She first reached fame with her novel He Was Cool, which she serialized for 2 months since August 2001 in Daum's humor threads when she was a 2nd year in high school in Jecheon girl's high school. Subsequent works such as Romance of Their Own, spawned commercially successful films of the same name. Since then, one of her other books, Do Re Mi Fa So La Ti Do, has become a film starring Jang Keun-suk. A movie of To My Boyfriend is also in planning stages. Despite her commercial success, Guiyeoni has been criticized for her lack of literary perfection, overuse of emoticons, and unrealistic setting in her works. Besides the aforementioned novels, she has also written Africa, Five Stars, and written and illustrated a manhwa called Syndrome.

== Personal life ==
She married in 2018.

== Works ==
- He Was Cool (2001)
- Temptation of Wolves (also known as Romance of Their Own) (2002)
- Do Re Mi Fa So La Ti Do (2003)
- To My Boyfriend (2004) (adapted into a play (musical) in 2016)
- Outsider (2005)
- Five Stars (2006)
- Syndrome (2007)
- Finding An Angel (2008)
- Lucid Dream (2010)
- Pampinella (2011)
- Love Me (2015)
