= Zenith: The Last City =

- Official cover art
- Developer: RamenVR
- Publisher: RamenVR
- Engine: Unity
- Platforms: Windows; SteamVR; PlayStation 4 Meta Quest 2
- Release: January 27, 2022 (early access)
- Genre: Massively multiplayer online role-playing game
- Mode: Multiplayer

Zenith: The Last City is a virtual reality open world massively multiplayer online role-playing game (MMORPG) developed and published by Californian game development studio Ramen VR. The game was officially released in early access for Microsoft Windows, Oculus Quest, and PlayStation VR on January 27, 2022. Upon launch, the game had more than 4,000 players playing online. The game takes inspiration from various anime shows such as Sword Art Online and JRPG games such as Final Fantasy XIV.

== Development ==
As of March 2022 the game received a $35 million investment, allowing the company to double the staff working on the game and potentially also port the game to regular desktops and smartphones. On June 16 of 2022, the first major update called Celestial Throne was released, expanding the playable area and adding more content to the game.

== Critical reception ==
The game received generally mixed to positive feedback, with critics praising it for being an immersive and entertaining experience. It combines VR and MMORPG genres, and is one of the first VR games to do so. It has also been noted that the game has less content and world size than its non-VR competitors, leaving a lot of room and potential for future updates.
