= Korean literature in translation =

The current concept of Korean Literature (한국문학) focuses mostly on the literary work evolved within South Korea, its translation and gradual transition into 'World Literature' caused by the national globalisation drive, commonly known as 'Segyehwa' (세계화) (Medina, 2018).

== History ==
Translation of Korean Literature largely began as an economic project in the 1990s that was gradually transformed into a cultural project during the 2000s. Announced in 1994, South Korean President Kim Young-Sam’s Globalisation policy, heavily focused on the strategic transformation of Korea into a “first-rate-nation” (Kim Young Sam, 1995). Following this policy, the country invested their time and effort into the development and promotion of Korean art and culture. During 2000, South Korea had already fulfilled the checklist for industrial and national developments. The strategy to globalise the Korean culture through certain policies, corporate and government strategic and cultural production not only well established the desire to be a part of the ‘World Culture’ but also focused heavily on preserving the root essence of the national aspects of it (Corral & UNESCO, 2000). The attempt to make it more appealing to the international audience, the strategic cohabitation of the Government, cultural institutes and the literary knowledge production houses, combinedly incorporated Korean Literature into a type of cultural discourse.

As a consequence of the rising Korean wave or 'Hallyu' or 한류, by 2005, K-pop music, Korean dramas and movies along with the cuisine already become popular among the East and Southeast Asian audience (Hwang, 2013).

During the COVID 19 pandemic, the availability of Korean dramas such as Squid Game, Crash Landing on You on popular platforms such as Netflix, movies such as Bong Joon Ho's Parasite, along with the fandoms of K-pop groups such as BTS, Blackpink, and Twice further aided to the increasing popularity of Korean culture, literature and cuisine (Gibson, 2021).

== Major organizations ==
Three primary organizations that have played a significant role in the globalization of Korean literature are the Literature Translation Institute of Korea or LTI Korea, the Daesan Foundation, and the International Communication Foundations or ICF. Since their establishment, these institutions have been providing financial support to the translators, authors, publishers via grants and prizes, developing educational training courses, hosting an array of several programs to strengthen the connection between Korean Literature and World Literature (Kim, 2002). Among these three key organizations, LTI Korea gradually emerged as one of the most significant ones to cast an impact. Since its establishment in 1996, LTI, Korea or ‘한국문학번역원’ has been working with the goal of successfully promoting the Korean Literature to the global audience. Several translations and publications have been sponsored by LTI, Korea along with arranging multiple overseas exchange programs between Korea and the overseas publishers and professional translators (Walraven & Breuker, 2007).

All of the LTI sponsored programs tend to focus on specific areas related to literature. Some of the key programs and facilities supported by LTI Korea are Translation Grants Program, Publication Grants Program, Education Program, Information Service, LTI Korea Library, etc. Each quarter, LTI Korea selects and oversees the translation of several Korean literary fiction, poetry, non-fiction, YA books, graphic novels and so on. Publication grants are also provided to the foreign publishers who have already acquired copyrights to works, translated by LTI Korea. Additionally, for the purpose of more engagement, LTI Korea conducts and participates in multiple cultural events. Previously, the forum was held in the US, Spain, France, Japan, Germany, etc. Another key event conducted by LTI Korea is Seoul's International Writers’ Festival. From fantasy, empathy to strategy, the workshops have focused on many themes. Eminent writers such as Bae Suah, Pyun Hye-young, Choi-Seoung-oh, and Min Jin Lee have been a part of these workshops.

The translation academies organized by LTI Korea in foreign languages like English, German, Chinese, French, Spanish, Russian and Japanese focus on the training of translators. In addition to nurturing and upskill the current translators, LTI Korea also provides Korean Literature Translation awards to the new and existing translators.

== LTI Korea library and translated literature ==
Opened to the common mass in 2007, the LTI Korea Library became the first library in Korea to include collections of translated Korean books, periodicals on Korean Literature, Ebooks, CDs, DVDs, etc. From common foreign languages such as English, German, French, Greek, Italian, Arabic, Swedish to the Asian ones such as Japanese, Thai, Bengali, Hindi, Mongolian, Chinese and many more, the Korean Literature has already been translated into approximately 48 foreign languages.

Famous Korean books translated into foreign languages include Pachinko by Min Jin Lee, Kim Jiyoung Born 1982 by Cho Nam-Joo, Please Look After Mother by Kyung Sook Shin, The White Book by Han Kang, and The Hen Who Dreamed She Could Fly by Hwang Sun-mi.

With the newly discovered power of Korean Literature in Translation, the country is now thriving and working towards globalizing their culture, deeply rooted in the nationalist value and rich literature to claim significant positions besides the significant literary discourses from other countries.
