= Legendary Moonlight Sculptor =

South Korean web novel series

Legendary Moonlight Sculptor (Korean: 달빛조각사; RR: Dalbich Jogagsa) is a South Korean web novel by Heesung Nam. The series was published from January 2007 to July 2019, with 1450 chapters on KakaoPage. Its chapters have been collected into 57 volumes as of April 2020.

== Plot ==
Legendary Moonlight Sculptor follows the adventures of a young man named Lee Hyun, who is an impoverished student living in a near-future Korea where virtual reality massively multiplayer online role-playing games (VRMMORPGs) have become the most popular form of entertainment and commerce.

Lee Hyun, also known by his in-game name "Weed", was formerly known as the legendary God of War of the highly popular MMORPG, Continent of Magic. In an attempt to help his debt-ridden family, he auctions his character to find it sells at ₩3.1 billion. Later, an unfortunate run-in with loan sharks causes Lee Hyun to lose almost all of his money. This causes him to step into the new era of gaming led by the first-ever Virtual reality MMORPG, Royal Road, to help his ailing grandmother and save enough for his sister's future college tuition. Despite starting out with nothing, he quickly proves to be a highly skilled player, making use of his real-life experience in poverty to become an expert in frugality and resourcefulness.

As he explores the vast world of Royal Road, Weed also discovers the potential for creating art within the game world, and he quickly becomes famous for his ability to sculpt beautiful works of art. Along the way, he forms alliances and rivalries with other players, and he battles monsters and powerful enemies to achieve his goals.

As the story progresses, Weed's reputation as a master sculptor and powerful adventurer grows, and he eventually becomes embroiled in political intrigue and the machinations of powerful corporations that seek to control the game world. Despite the many challenges he faces, Weed remains determined to succeed and protect those he cares about, leading him on a thrilling journey of discovery, adventure, and self-realization.

== Characters ==
=== Famous characters ===
==== Weed (Lee Hyun) ====
A high school drop-out, Lee Hyun is talented gamer with an enormous debt, primarily inherited from his deceased parents. To raise money, he places his gaming avatar, Weed from the Continent of Magic, on auction, causing an uproar due its fame as the game's strongest avatar, and earns ₩3.09 billion (roughly $2.76 million) from it. Due to the inherited debt however, much of the money is collected by loan sharks, leaving Lee Hyun with around ₩90 million (roughly $75,000). With his ailing grandmother and younger sister in mind, he joins the recently launched VR-MMORPG, Royal Road to earn more money. Lee Hyun presently uses his old avatar name, Weed, on Royal Road.

Over the course of the story, he is given the secret class Legendary Moonlight Sculptor. His quick growth and achievements earn him a spot in the Royal Road Hall of Fame, which allows the game's top 500 players to place videos of their adventures online. Through a series of quests, he becomes the Lord of Morata, and later the King of Arpen. He is often referred to as the Greatest Ruler in the North. He is sometimes called the head priest of puljook shingyo (grass stewism) because when he enslaved hundreds of gamers to build a giant sphinx, he fed them only grass stew.

==== Seoyoon (Jeong Seoyoon) ====
Seoyoon, popularly known as the Goddess in Royal Road, is the female protagonist of the series. Described as a spectacularly beautiful woman, Seoyoon was left emotionless and mute due to childhood trauma. She started playing Royal Road as a method for trauma therapy, and plays as a silent berserker. In Volume 39, she begins dating Weed. As of Volume 42, Chapter 8, Seoyoon is at a level mark of 471.

==== Yurin (Lee Hayan) ====
Lee Hayan is Weed's younger sister, and the primary reason behind the latter's actions to make money: college tuition. She is introduced in volume one as a high school student, and later proceeds to enrol to a university as a student in liberal arts. After successful acceptance, she decides to start playing Royal Road alongside her brother. She is presently a level 80, Aqualight Painter affiliated with the Arpen Kingdom.

==== Da'in ====
Weed first encounters Dain in the City of Heaven in Lavia, inside a dungeon known as the Cave of Dead Warriors. She is an exceptionally skilled shaman due to her unique style of training, and is a founding member of the famous Hermes Guild. Through the course of their time together, Dain is encouraged by Weed's personality to undergo a high-risk medical surgery in the real world. She was also Weed's first love.

==== Hwaryeong (Jeong Hyo-Lin) ====
Jeong Hyo-Lin is a world-renowned and successful singer, who plays the game as Hwaryeong, a dancer class, to relieve the stress of being famous yet single. Like Weed, she is familiar with the importance of increasing skill proficiency over regular levelling, making her a formidable character despite the weak profession or class. It is later revealed that she has feelings for Weed, though unrequited.

==== Geomchi (Ahn Hyundo) ====
Ahn Hyundo is a former World Swords Fighting Champion, having won the competition for four consecutive years before retiring to hone his skill with the sword. He joins his disciple Weed in Royal Road after witnessing the latter's improvement with the sword in the real life by experiencing combat in the game world. Known throughout Korea as the leader of the largest and finest Dojang of South Korea, Ahn Hyundo had initially decided to venture into Royal Road by himself, only to have his inner circle follow him into the game. Based on an inference from volume 37, chapter 10, Geomchi is estimated to be above the level mark of 400. He later unlocks the secret class profession – the Martial Artist, and is affiliated with the Arpen Kingdom.

==== Bard Ray ====
Bard Ray, translated occasionally as either Bad Ray or Bradley, is a French gamer in Royal Road of the unique Black Knight class. He's known to have arisen from being somebody's minion to a knight and then an Earl by means of treachery. Using the influence and power of the Hermes Guild, he wages a ruthless conquest, which results in him becoming the Emperor of the Haven Empire. Popularly known as the God of Weapons, he's currently at a level mark of 560.

=== Famous non-player characters (NPCs) ===
==== Geihar von Arpen (The First Emperor) ====
Having conquered the whole continent, Geihar von Arpen was the first to become Emperor in the Royal Road universe. He is a historical singularity, being a master sculptor, a master sword master, and an emperor. Due to the prejudices surrounding the sculptor class as being useless, he stated the lack of worthy successors in his legacy. After his death the empire collapsed and split into multiple kingdoms.

==== Van Hawk (Death Knight) ====
Van Hawk was a Death Knight under the direct command of the Undead Lich King, Bar Khan. He was entrusted with the task of guarding the stolen relic of Freya, Helain's Grail, which was enshrined at Bar Khan's crypt in the Sky City of Lavia. Weed defeated him en route to completing his retrieval of Helain's Grail and was awarded the Crimson Necklace of Life as a result, which he could later use to summon Van Hawk. Through the course of the story, the Death Knight is freed from the influence of Bar Khan and pledges his loyalty to Weed, which meant that the latter could now summon him even without the necklace. After being freed from the Lich King's influence, Van Hawk is able to remember parts of his life prior to becoming an Undead.

==== Bahamorg (Barbarian) ====
Bahamorg is a barbarian-class sculptural lifeform created by Geihar Von Arpen, the first emperor to have conquered the whole continent in the Royal Road lore. He currently acknowledges Weed as his master after being revived by the latter through the Sculptural Life Bestowal ability. He dual-wields using an axe and a mace, and of the 47 sculptural lifeforms, ranks as the strongest. Known as the Hero of Arpen, Bahamorg is known to have an astoundingly high level mark of 588.

==== Hestiger (Sun Warrior) ====
A powerful and historical figure from the warring age and the right hand of the Pallos Empire, Hesitgar was briefly resurrected by Weed to lead the battle against the Haven Empire's six imperial army divisions. Weed used the Sculptural Resurrection technique to resurrect him for twenty-four hours. Hestiger defended the Arpen Kingdom at the Earth Palace battle, with the command for destroying both the second and sixth army divisions of Haven's imperial army. In the battle, he killed Haven's imperial commander – Drom. After the destruction of the imperial army, Weed and Hestiger hunted through the night over three continents. As the resurrection time expired, Hestiger granted Weed an S-Rank quest. A Knight-class, Desert Warrior, he is also remembered for receiving the title – Saviour of the World.

==== Roderick (Battle Mage) ====
Roderick is a famous historical figure, briefly resurrected by Weed – twenty-one hours – to aid the latter's effort to free the Central Continent from Lesser Demon Lord Montus and an army of demon soldiers. As the legendary battle-mage, Roderick is known to utilize powerful and unique spells for combat; he is also capable of casting several spells rapidly without having to worry about mana limitations. In his battles, it is also revealed that he is capable of absorbing mana from the environment.

==== Torido (True Vampire Lord) ====
Lord Torido, also translated as Tori, is the leader of the True Blood Vampire Clan, and is also one of the forty-seven rules of Todeum, a vampire kingdom with three moons. Weed encounters Tor as a part of a questline to free the Morata region and the Paladins of Freya's Church; it was mentioned that the clan possessed more than a thousand soldiers, with the lowest ranking vampire being level 270. At the time, Lord Torido was known to hold a level mark of 400. He first appeared in volume three, chapter ten. After his death at the hands of Weed, Lord Torido drops a summoning necklace similar to the one dropped by Van Hawk. He later pledges absolute loyalty to Weed in the Plains of Despair, having previously served Bar Khan. The pledge was undertaken through the Power of the Blood Oath, which granted Weed a unique item – Vampire's Blood; it held the power to permanently increase mana by 300 with the possibility of randomly increasing or decreasing other statistics. Lord Torido briefly became Seoyoon's follower in Volume 9, but was once again traded to Weed for a rabbit.

== Media ==
=== Light novels ===
Legendary Moonlight Sculptor was published as a web novel on KakaoPage and was written by Heesung Nam. The series was published from January 2007 to July 2019, with its individual chapters published in 57 volumes as of April 2020.

Volumes 1-10
	Volume	Release Date(s)	ISBN
1	Volume 1	January 15, 2007	ISBN 9788958579038
2	Volume 2	January 15, 2007	ISBN 9788958579045
3	Volume 3	February 22, 2007	ISBN 9788958579052
4	Volume 4	April 6, 2007	ISBN 9788958579069
5	Volume 5	May 26, 2007	ISBN 9788958579076
6	Volume 6	June 29, 2007	ISBN 9788925701271
7	Volume 7	August 14, 2007	ISBN 9788925702247
8	Volume 8	October 9, 2007	ISBN 9788925702254
9	Volume 9	December 7, 2007	ISBN 9788925703947
10	Volume 10	February 23, 2008	ISBN 9788925703954

Volumes 11-20
	Volume	Release Date(s)	ISBN
1	Volume 11	June 11, 2008	ISBN 9788925705675
2	Volume 12	September 11, 2008	ISBN 9788925705682
3	Volume 13	December 22, 2008	ISBN 9788925708102
4	Volume 14	January 29, 2009	ISBN 9788925708119
5	Volume 15	March 31, 2009	ISBN 9788925708126
6	Volume 16	May 30, 2009	ISBN 9788925710204
7	Volume 17	July 23, 2009	ISBN 9788925710211
8	Volume 18	September 17, 2009	ISBN 9788925710228
9	Volume 19	November 28, 2009	ISBN 9788925712864
10	Volume 20	December 28, 2009	ISBN 9788925712871

Volumes 21-30
	Volume	Release Date(s)	ISBN
1	Volume 21	March 12, 2010	ISBN 9788925712888
2	Volume 22	May 20, 2010	ISBN 9788925712895
3	Volume 23	July 14, 2010	ISBN 9788925716152
4	Volume 24	September 1, 2010	ISBN 9788925716169
5	Volume 25	October 22, 2010	ISBN 9788925716176
6	Volume 26	December 1, 2010	ISBN 9788925718149
7	Volume 27	January 25, 2011	ISBN 9788925718156
8	Volume 28	March 2, 2011	ISBN 9788925719597
9	Volume 29	April 22, 2011	ISBN 9788925719603
10	Volume 30	June 15, 2011	ISBN 9788925719610

Volumes 31-40
	Volume	Release Date(s)	ISBN
1	Volume 31	August 18, 2011	ISBN 9788925721699
2	Volume 32	October 18, 2011	ISBN 9788925721705
3	Volume 33	December 30, 2011	ISBN 9788925721712
4	Volume 34	February 29, 2012	ISBN 9788925725291
5	Volume 35	May 1, 2012	ISBN 9788925725307
6	Volume 36	June 26, 2012	ISBN 9788925727202
7	Volume 37	September 3, 2012	ISBN 9788925727219
8	Volume 38	October 31, 2012	ISBN 9788925727226
9	Volume 39	January 31, 2013	ISBN 9788925727233
10	Volume 40	June 18, 2013	ISBN 9788925727240

Volumes 41-50
	Volume	Release Date(s)	ISBN
1	Volume 41	November 15, 2013	ISBN 9788925732985
2	Volume 42	January 17, 2014	ISBN 9788925782775
3	Volume 43	April 3, 2014	ISBN 9788925766454
4	Volume 44	July 30, 2014	ISBN 9791125562863
5	Volume 45	December 31, 2014	ISBN 9791125562870
6	Volume 46	August 31, 2015	ISBN 9791125562887
7	Volume 47	April 21, 2016	ISBN 9791159609084
8	Volume 48	October 31, 2016	ISBN 9791160481921
9	Volume 49	March 14, 2017	ISBN 9791160481938
10	Volume 50	June 5, 2017	ISBN 9791160481945

Volumes 51-57
	Volume	Release Date(s)	ISBN
1	Volume 51	August 31, 2017	ISBN 9791129409782
2	Volume 52	January 11, 2018	ISBN 9791129409799
3	Volume 53	July 4, 2018	ISBN 9791129409805
4	Volume 54	September 5, 2018	ISBN 9791129409812
5	Volume 55	March 25, 2019	ISBN 9791129409829
6	Volume 56	April 26, 2019	ISBN 9791135421754
7	Volume 57	April 1, 2020	ISBN 9791135421761

==== U.S. release ====
The first official authorized English release of the series is scheduled for March 2, 2027 in ebook and audiobook formats by Media Goat and Audible.

Media Goat (Heroes Gate Corp) holds exclusive worldwide English rights, granted via written agreement dated September 16, 2025. This is the first authorized English edition per the author and original rights holder.

=== Webtoon ===
A webtoon adaptation of the novels, illustrated by Kim Tae-Hyung, has been created. The content of the webtoon does not deviate from the novels, with the first season (fifty-two chapters) covering the story until volume two, chapter seven, and the second season (fifty-three chapters) covering the story until volume five, chapter four. The third season covers the story until volume eight, chapter six.

=== Film ===
In 2022, it was reported that an animated film adaptation was in production by Studio W Baba.

== Reception ==
The series has sold more than a million books in a market with an estimated 3.5 million readers, and consistently ranks in first place in terms of eBook sales.
