= Snack culture =

Consuming media in brief periods of time

Snack culture (Korean: 스낵컬처) is the South Korean trend of consuming entertainment or other media in brief periods, typically of 15 minutes or less. It is a practice which emerged due to the popularization of smartphones and the desire of content-providers to reach an increasingly busy and mobile population. The Korean Times wrote in 2014 that "'snack culture' is becoming representative of the Korean cultural scene." It has been called "a hot topic" in the media-content industry in 2014. Due to its significance, several scholars paid attention to snack culture, and in particular in tandem with webtoons. Snack culture—the habit of consuming information and cultural resources like webtoons quickly rather than engaging at a deeper level—is becoming representative of the Korean cultural scene in the 21st century as discussed in Dal Yong Jin's book on Transmedia Storytelling.

== Definition ==
The term snack culture comes from consuming media in a short time, like a snack that can be enjoyed anytime and anywhere. Snack culture is consumed in brief periods, between 30 seconds and 15 minutes, and is characterized by a light and compact format. In contrast, binge-watching, which became a popular term at about the same time, involves consuming media for hours at a time.

== Background ==
Snack culture developed organically alongside the use of smartphones. According to statistics published in 2015 by the Ministry of Science, Information and Communication Technology and Future Planning, the number of smartphone users in South Korea exceeds 40 million. A 2015 survey by the Korea Communications Commission showed that 76.9 percent of South Koreans use smartphones, particularly when commuting.

Mobile-device users typically consume online cultural content for an average period of 10 minutes. Mainly on the move, they become accustomed to the short segments. Snack culture such as webtoons, web dramas or web fiction books have continued to increase in popularity. To meet the increasing demand by smartphone users, content that is suitable and can be quickly accessed is under constant development. Advertisers joined the trend with ads that mimic web drama and music video formats, so that users don't reject the advertisement.

== Characterization and criticisms ==
By using mobile device, snack culture has Good accessibility. There is a tendency among snack-culture consumers to search for simplified content which is easier to consume. Snack culture is mainly focused on simple interest-oriented content. The short and simple content means that users do not have to invest a great deal of time or attention. They can enjoy it for a brief time or abandon it midway through.

An increasing proportion of media content is becoming snack culture according to public consumption patterns. Some fear that it threatens the place of a deeper and more-engaging culture with a depth of thought. The nature of snack culture with its compression and simplification can undermine the essence of a greater and more-meaningful culture.

== Content providers ==
Naver produces webtoons and web dramas. Kakao connects to mobile-specific snack culture. Pikicast and moncast. are popular snack culture apps. Card news is a mobile-only news service which allows users to view only the stories they wish, edited to be interesting.
