= Kakao Page =

South Korean content platform

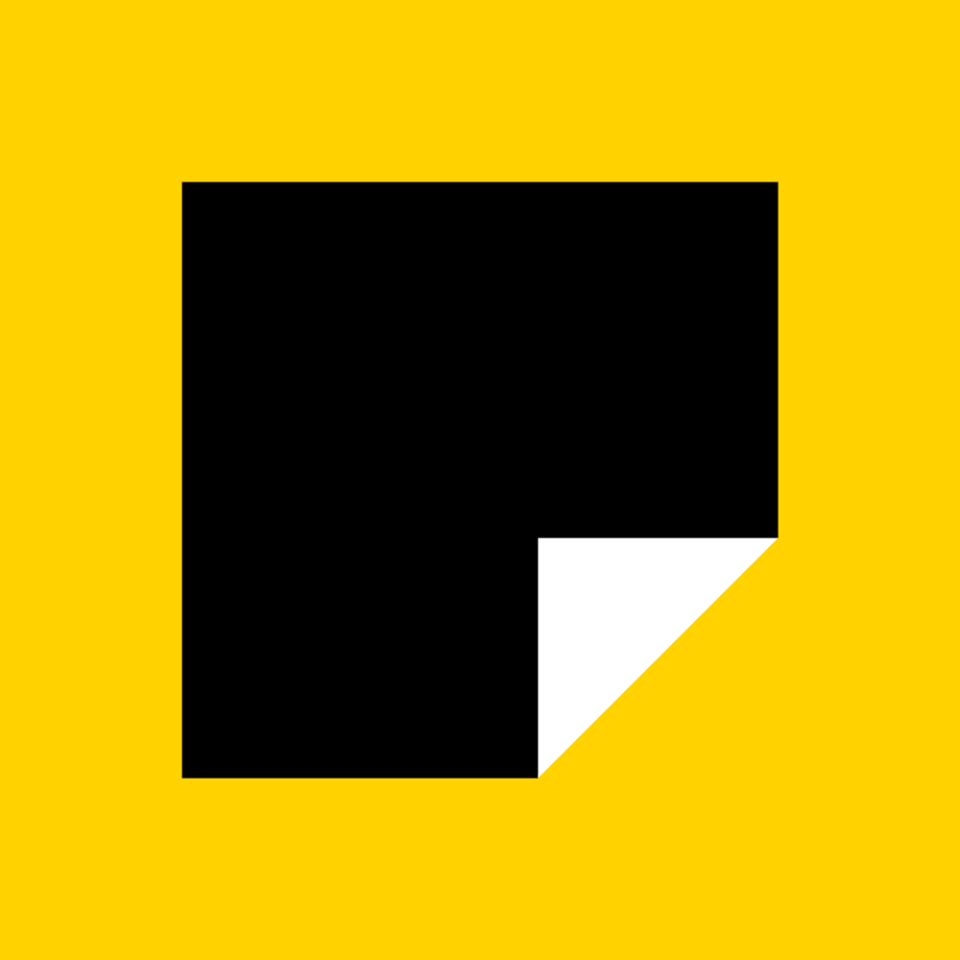
- Available in: Korean, Indonesian
- Owner: Kakao
- Website: page.kakao.com kakaocorp.com/service/KakaoPage

Kakao Page (Korean: 카카오페이지) or kakaopage is a monetized content platform optimized for mobile devices, launched by Kakao Corp. in 2013 and currently owned by its subsidiary Kakao Entertainment. The service launched on April 9, 2013, as a digital content marketplace, allowing brands and individuals to create and distribute visual, audio, and written content such as webtoons, and genre fiction. It entered the Indonesian market in 2018 and Taiwan in 2020.

Kakao Page is famous in South Korea for its "free if you wait" system that allows readers to view one episode of a webtoon or web novel for free if they wait for a certain amount of time after reading.

== History ==
The service's then-operator, Podotree Co., Ltd. (which changed its name to Kakao Page Corp. in 2018), was founded on July 20, 2010, as a subsidiary of Kakao.

Kakao Page was deemed a failure by mid-2013, but after adding Legendary Moonlight Sculptor and several other popular works, the service bounced back. By April 21, 2014, they had started their free webtoon and web fiction service. In 2014, they announced that they would add over 100 different webtoon series before the year was out.

Any individual can create content, upload it to Kakao Page, and sell it directly to other consumers on the platform. The total revenue for any sale is distributed as follows: 30% to Google Play, 20% to Kakao, and the remaining 50% to the publisher.

By September 2019, Kakao Page had recorded over 66,000 contents in total and 22 million accumulated members.

== Investments ==
Kakao Page Corp. owned 19.8 percent of Haksan Publishing, 22.2 percent of Seoul Media Comics, and 19.8 percent of Daewon C.I., all of them publishers of comics. It also owned 21.9 percent of the stock in drama production company Mega Monster, which is a subsidiary of its then-sister company Kakao M.

In 2018, the company acquired Neobazar, Indonesia's top webtoon platform company, for 13.8 billion won.

In July 2020, Kakao Page invested in the US-based web-novel platform Radish for 32.2 billion won.

In August 2020, Kakao Page acquired 49% of the multinational drama and film production company Kross Pictures for 5.8 billion won.

In March 2021, Kakao Page Corp. and Kakao M merged into a company named Kakao Entertainment, while having its own representative system under the name "Page Company" there.

== In the media ==
In 2017, actor Park Bo-gum became Kakao Page's first brand ambassador and has since appeared in print, digital, and visual media advertisements for the brand.

== Features ==
As of July 2024, there are 667 Manhwa titles being serialized and 540 titles that have been completed.

== See also ==
- Kakao Webtoon
- Piccoma
