= List of Sword Art Online video games =

Several video games based on Sword Art Online, a light novel series written by Reki Kawahara and illustrated by Abec, have been released on multiple platforms. The story follows Kazuto "Kirito" Kirigaya after he gets trapped in the eponymous VRMMORPG. Plans to adapt Sword Art Online into a video game were first announced at a stage event at the Dengeki Bunko Autumn Festival in October 2011. The console games span multiple genres and form an alternate timeline, featuring original characters and distinct ways of integrating the source material's storyline.

The first game in the series, Infinity Moment, was developed by Aquria and released exclusively in Japan for the PlayStation Portable in March 2013. The second game, Aquria's Hollow Fragment, was initially released in Japan in April 2014 for the PlayStation Vita; it later launched in North America, Europe, and Australia in August 2014. It incorporates the content of Infinity Moment with various modifications. The games were followed by Artdink's Lost Song (2015), Aquria's Hollow Realization (2016), Dimps' Fatal Bullet (2018), Aquria's Alicization Lycoris (2020) and Last Recollection (2023), Dimps' Fractured Daydream (2024), and Game Studio's Echoes of Aincrad (2026).

The console games have cumulatively sold over 10 million units worldwide by March 2026, (Note: The 10-million figure includes sales from digital and Steam versions.) while the mobile games have exceeded 25 million downloads by November 2018.

== Console games ==
| Game | Details |
|---|---|
| Sword Art Online: Infinity Moment Original release date: JP: March 14, 2013 | Release years by system: 2013 – PlayStation Portable |
| Sword Art Online: Infinity Moment Original release date: JP: March 14, 2013 | Notes: Sword Art Online: Infinity Moment (ソードアート・オンライン -インフィニティ・モーメント-, Sōdo Āto Onrain: Infiniti Mōmento) was published by Namco Bandai Games for the PlayStation Portable. The game follows an alternate storyline, in which a glitch causes Kirito and the other players to remain in Sword Art Online despite defeating Heathcliff, and players from other VMMORPGs such as Leafa and Sinon get sucked into the game themselves. |
| Sword Art Online: Hollow Fragment Original release dates: JP: April 24, 2014; TW: May 29, 2014; NA: August 19, 2014; EU: August 20, 2014; AU: August 20, 2014 | Release years by system: 2014 – PlayStation Vita; 2015 – PlayStation 4; 2018 – Windows |
| Sword Art Online: Hollow Fragment Original release dates: JP: April 24, 2014; TW: May 29, 2014; NA: August 19, 2014; EU: August 20, 2014; AU: August 20, 2014 | Notes: Sword Art Online: Hollow Fragment takes place in the same alternative storyline as Sword Art Online: Infinity Moment, and it includes all content of "Floor Clearing" from that previous game with the addition of new unexplored "Hollow Area" of Aincrad. The protagonist Kirito fights a mysterious player who becomes one of the key characters in the game. The game sold 145,029 physical retail copies within the first week of release in Japan, topping the Japanese software sales charts for that particular week. |
| Sword Art Online: Lost Song Original release dates: JP: March 26, 2015; SEA: May 12, 2015; EU: November 13, 2015; NA: November 17, 2015 | Release years by system: 2015 – PlayStation Vita, PlayStation 3, PlayStation 4; 2018 – Windows |
| Sword Art Online: Lost Song Original release dates: JP: March 26, 2015; SEA: May 12, 2015; EU: November 13, 2015; NA: November 17, 2015 | Notes: Developed by Artdink, the game is an open-world action RPG featuring an original storyline, set within Alfheim Online, where characters are able to fly. The game sold 139,298 physical retail copies on the PlayStation Vita in addition to another 55,090 units on the PlayStation 3 within its first week of release in Japan, ranking second and sixth place respectively within the Japanese software sales charts for that particular week, narrowly behind Bloodborne taking the top spot. |
| Sword Art Online: Hollow Realization Original release dates: JP: October 27, 2016; WW: November 8, 2016 | Release years by system: 2016 – PlayStation Vita, PlayStation 4; 2017 – Windows; 2019 – Nintendo Switch |
| Sword Art Online: The Beginning Unreleased – N/A | Notes: A virtual reality massive multiplayer online game, Sword Art Online: The Beginning, was in development by Kadokawa and IBM Japan, but was only a demo and will not be released as a full game. |
| Sword Art Online: Fatal Bullet Original release dates: JP: February 8, 2018; WW: February 23, 2018 | Release years by system: 2018 – PlayStation 4, Xbox One, Windows; 2019 – Nintendo Switch |
| Sword Art Online: Alicization Lycoris Original release dates: JP: July 9, 2020; WW: July 10, 2020 | Release years by system: 2020 – PlayStation 4, Xbox One, Windows; 2022 – Nintendo Switch |
| Sword Art Online: Alicization Lycoris Original release dates: JP: July 9, 2020; WW: July 10, 2020 | Notes: A video game based in the Underworld of Project Alicization, Sword Art Online: Alicization Lycoris, was announced by Bandai Namco. The game is also the first in the series to faithfully follow the canon storyline in the initial stage, adapting from Alicization Beginning, volume 9, to Alicization Uniting, volume 14. Following that, the game features a different arc focusing on Medina Orthinanos. Originally, the game was going to be released in May 2020, but it was delayed to July 10, 2020, due to the COVID-19 pandemic. |
| Sword Art Online: Last Recollection Original release dates: JP: October 5, 2023; WW: October 6, 2023 | Release years by system: 2023 – PlayStation 4, PlayStation 5, Xbox One, Xbox Series X/S, Windows |
| Sword Art Online: Last Recollection Original release dates: JP: October 5, 2023; WW: October 6, 2023 | Notes: Bandai Namco announced the video game Sword Art Online: Last Recollection in March 2023. Reona performed the game's theme song, "VITA". |
| Sword Art Online: Fractured Daydream Original release dates: JP: October 3, 2024; WW: October 4, 2024 | Release years by system: 2024 – PlayStation 5, Xbox Series X/S, Nintendo Switch, Windows |
| Sword Art Online: Fractured Daydream Original release dates: JP: October 3, 2024; WW: October 4, 2024 | Notes: In February 2024, a video game Sword Art Online: Fractured Daydream was announced. |
| Echoes of Aincrad Original release dates: JP: July 9, 2026; WW: July 10, 2026 | Release years by system: 2026 – PlayStation 5, Xbox Series X/S, Windows |

== Mobile games ==
| Game | Details |
|---|---|
| Sword Art Quest Original release date: JP: May 21, 2012 | Release years by system: 2012 – Browser |
| Sword Art Quest Original release date: JP: May 21, 2012 | Notes: The game was discontinued on February 6, 2015. |
| SAO: Log Out Original release date: JP: 2012 | Release years by system: 2012 – Android |
| SAO: Log Out Original release date: JP: 2012 | Notes: A paid Android game that users can download and play with characters from the series and obtain wallpapers from it. |
| Sword Art Online: End World Original release date: JP: February 28, 2013 | Release years by system: 2013 – Mobile |
| Sword Art Online: End World Original release date: JP: February 28, 2013 | Notes: The game achieved more than 1 million registered users upon its launch. The game's service was discontinued in September 2017. |
| Sword Art Quest II Original release date: JP: June 23, 2014 | Release years by system: 2014 – Android, iOS |
| Sword Art Quest II Original release date: JP: June 23, 2014 | Notes: It provides challenges to users to upgrade their characters to receive rewards. |
| Sword Art Online: Code Register Original release date: JP: November 28, 2014 | Release years by system: 2014 – Android, iOS |
| Sword Art Online: Code Register Original release date: JP: November 28, 2014 | Notes: More than 3,000,000 users have downloaded the game. |
| Sword Art Online: Progress Link Original release date: JP: February 9, 2015 | Release years by system: 2015 – Browser |
| Sword Art Online: Progress Link Original release date: JP: February 9, 2015 | Notes: The game was discontinued on July 29, 2016. |
| The Black Swordsman Original release date: CHN: May 26, 2016 | Release years by system: 2016 – Android, iOS |
| The Black Swordsman Original release date: CHN: May 26, 2016 | Notes: The Black Swordsman (黒衣剣士; Chinese: 黑衣剑士) is a Chinese 3D role-playing game where the player can control 3D characters and experience Sword Art Online, Alfheim Online, and Gun Gale Online. It is developed by Yun Chang Game under Bandai Namco's supervision. The game is being distributed and is operating under Bandai Namco Shanghai, Bandai Namco Entertainment and Qihoo 360 on Chinese platforms. It is officially still in an "open beta" phase. |
| Sword Art Online: Memory Defrag Original release dates: JP: August 29, 2016; WW: January 24, 2017 | Release years by system: 2016 – Android, iOS |
| Sword Art Online: Memory Defrag Original release dates: JP: August 29, 2016; WW: January 24, 2017 | Notes: Featuring content from the anime series, Ordinal Scale, and some original shorts written for event characters, players are allowed to play solo and progress through the story, or join up with others online to farm special items, equipment, and materials. Common events include ranked challenges against other players, floor clearing, character introductions and seasonal events. Players have the choice of spending real money to speed-up their progress. However, the game was discontinued on August 30, 2021. While Memory Defrag is delisted from the app stores, the game is still available to play via offline version of the app if the person downloaded the game before the termination date. |
| Sword Art Online: Integral Factor Original release dates: JP: November 30, 2017; WW: March 28, 2018 | Release years by system: 2017 – Android, iOS; 2023 – Windows |
| Sword Art Online: Integral Factor Original release dates: JP: November 30, 2017; WW: March 28, 2018 | Notes: Bandai Namco released the Sword Art Online: Integral Factor free-to-play MMORPG, created in conjunction with prolific mobile MMO developer Asobimo. It adapts the Aincrad arc starting from Floor 1 and gradually exploring every floor one-by-one. It allows playing as a player-created avatar. |
| Sword Art Online VR: Lovely Honey Days Original release date: JP: October 5, 2018 | Release years by system: 2018 – Android, iOS |
| Sword Art Online VR: Lovely Honey Days Original release date: JP: October 5, 2018 | Notes: Bandai Namco Entertainment released the Sword Art Online VR: Lovely Honey Days mobile game in Japan. The game's first episode is free-to-play, while the second episode and so on can be purchased as additional content. |
| Sword Art Online: Unleash Blading Original release date: WW: November 20, 2019 | Release years by system: 2019 – Android, iOS |
| Sword Art Online: Unleash Blading Original release date: WW: November 20, 2019 | Notes: It was originally known as Sword Art Online: Alicization Blading in Japan and Sword Art Online: Alicization Rising Steel in the West. In October 2021, the game was renamed to Sword Art Online: Unleash Blading. It was discontinued on January 16, 2023. |
| Sword Art Online: Black Swordsman Ace Original release date: CHN: June 9, 2021 (open beta) | Release years by system: 2021 – Android, iOS |
| Sword Art Online: Black Swordsman Ace Original release date: CHN: June 9, 2021 (open beta) | Notes: The game was discontinued on February 28, 2024. |
| Sword Art Online: Variant Showdown Original release date: WW: November 24, 2022 | Release years by system: 2022 – Android, iOS |
| Sword Art Online: Variant Showdown Original release date: WW: November 24, 2022 | Notes: In the future it will feature a battle royale mode, a first for an SAO game. It was re-released in December 2024 after undergoing maintenance due to major bugs. The game was discontinued on October 30, 2025. |

== Arcade games ==
| Game | Details |
|---|---|
| Sword Art Online Arcade: Deep Explorer Original release date: JP: March 19, 2019 | Release years by system: 2019 – Arcade |
| Sword Art Online Arcade: Deep Explorer Original release date: JP: March 19, 2019 | Notes: It is an exploration action RPG that supports up to three players in online co-op and it is the first arcade game in the Sword Art Online series. |

== Crossovers ==
| Game | Details |
|---|---|
| Dengeki Bunko: Fighting Climax Original release dates: JP: March 18, 2014; NA: October 6, 2015; EU: October 6, 2015 | Release years by system: 2014 – Arcade, PlayStation Vita, PlayStation 3; 2015 – PlayStation 4 |
| Dengeki Bunko: Fighting Climax Original release dates: JP: March 18, 2014; NA: October 6, 2015; EU: October 6, 2015 | Notes: Kirito, Asuna, Leafa, Yuuki and SAO Alternative: Gun Gale Online protagonist LLENN appear in Dengeki Bunko: Fighting Climax, a fighting game by Sega featuring various characters from works published under the Dengeki Bunko imprint. |
| Accel World vs. Sword Art Online Original release dates: JP: March 16, 2017; WW: July 7, 2017 | Release years by system: 2017 – PlayStation Vita, PlayStation 4, Windows |
| Accel World vs. Sword Art Online Original release dates: JP: March 16, 2017; WW: July 7, 2017 | Notes: The game is a crossover with Accel World and published by Bandai Namco Entertainment. |
