= Ayana Taketatsu =

Japanese voice actress

- 竹達 彩奈
- Born: June 23, 1989 (age 37); Saitama Prefecture, Japan
- Other name: Ayachi
- Occupations: Voice actress; singer
- Years active: 2007–present
- Agent: Ancheri
- Notable credits: Genshin Impact as Chiori; Kissxsis as Ako Suminoe; K-On! as Azusa Nakano; Oreimo as Kirino Kōsaka; Sword Art Online as Suguha Kirigaya/Leafa; Date A Live as Kotori Itsuka; Dagashi Kashi as Hotaru Shidare; Citrus as Yuzu Aihara; The Quintessential Quintuplets as Nino Nakano; Arknights as W; Peter Grill and the Philosopher's Time as Mimi Alpacas; Girlfriend, Girlfriend as Rika Hoshizaki; Bleach as Bambietta Basterbine; The Detective Is Already Dead as Nagisa Natsunagi
- Height: 151 cm (4 ft 11 in)
- Spouse: Yuki Kaji (m. 2019)
- Children: 1
- Musical career
- Genres: J-pop; Anison
- Instruments: Vocals; guitar
- Years active: 2012–present
- Label: Pony Canyon
- Website: ayanataketatsu.jp

Ayana Taketatsu (竹達 彩奈, Taketatsu Ayana; born June 23, 1989) is a Japanese voice actress and singer.

== Biography ==
She attended Nihon Narration Engi Kenkyujo, a voice actor training school before becoming affiliated there. She became affiliated with Link Plan. Due to her sharp vocal tones, she often voices tsundere characters (although she has voiced other mysterious or flirtatious characters). Taketatsu formed a singing unit Petit Milady alongside Aoi Yūki in 2013. Taketatsu left the talent agency Assemble Heart for the agency Link Plan on January 1, 2017.

Following the closure of Link Plan on 31 March 2025, Taketatsu became affiliated with Ancheri.

== Personal life ==
On her 30th birthday, she announced on Twitter that she married fellow voice actor Yuki Kaji.

On June 30, 2022, Taketatsu and Kaji announced that they were expecting their first child together. On November 3, 2022, she announced the birth of her daughter.

== Filmography ==
=== Anime series ===
Year	Title	Role	Other notes
2009	Queen's Blade	Mako	
2009	K-On!	Azusa Nakano	
2009	Sasameki Koto	Manaka Akemiya	
2009	A Certain Scientific Railgun	Bag Girl (ep 6), Girl (ep 7)	
2009	Needless	Yua	
2009	Maria Watches Over Us 4th Season	Baby	Episode 2
2009	Yumeiro Pâtissière	Vanilla	
2010	Demon King Daimao	Michie Ōtake	
2010	MM!	Mio Isurugi	
2010	Oreimo	Kirino Kōsaka	
2010	Highschool of the Dead	Alice Maresato	
2010	The World God Only Knows	Ayumi Takahara	
2010	Kissxsis	Ako Suminoe	
2010	K-On!!	Azusa Nakano	
2010	Jewelpet Twinkle	Miria Marigold Mackenzie	
2010	Star Driver	Aragon Simone	
2010	The Legend of the Legendary Heroes	Eslina Folkel	
2010	Baka and Test	Miharu Shimizu	
2010	Mayoi Neko Overrun!	Nozomi Kiriya, Shinobu (ep 7)	
2010	Yumeiro Pâtissière SP Professional	Vanilla	
2011	The World God Only Knows II	Ayumi Takahara	
2011	Guilty Crown	Tsugumi	
2011	Suzy's Zoo Daisuki! Witzy	Lulla	
2011	Tamagotchi!	Tomomi	
2011	Sket Dance	Obaa-nyan	Episode 22
2011	Double-J	Ema Houjō	
2011	Tamayura – Hitotose	Fū Sawatari	
2011	Dog Days	Eclair Martinozzi	
2011	Nekogami Yaoyorozu	Meiko	
2011	Baka to Test to Shōkanjū: Ni!	Miharu Shimizu	
2011	Ben-To	Asebi Inoue	
2011	Honto ni Atta! Reibai Sensei	Akira Yajima	Episodes 20–21
2011	YuruYuri	Majokko Mirakurun	
2011	Rio – Rainbow Gate!	Mint Clark	
2011	Phi Brain: Puzzle of God	Miharu Sakanoue	
2012	Queen's Blade Rebellion	Aldra	
2012	Gokujyo	Minami Kurihashi	
2012	Nakaimo – My Sister Is Among Them!	Rinka Kunitachi	
2012	Psycho-Pass	Shoko Sugawara/Spooky Boogie	Episodes 4–5
2012	Sword Art Online	Leafa/Suguha Kirigaya	
2012	Dog Days	Eclair Martinozzi	
2012	High School DxD	Koneko Tōjo	
2012	Aesthetica of a Rogue Hero	Minami Aihara	
2012	Hyouka	Manga Club Member Kimura	
2012	Phi-Brain – Puzzle of God: The Orpheus Order	Free Cell (young), Miharu Sakanoue	
2012	Busou Shinki	Zielbellen "Zil"	
2012	Pokémon: Black and White: Rival Destinies	Shōbu	
2012	Yurumates 3D Plus	Sae's younger sister	
2012	YuruYuri 2	Kurumi/Mirakurun	Episodes 1–6
2013	The World God Only Knows: Goddesses Arc	Ayumi Takahara, Mercurius	
2013	Wanna Be the Strongest in the World	Sakura Hagiwara	
2013	Zettai Bōei Leviathan	Jörmungandr	
2013	Sword Art Online: Extra Edition	Leafa/Suguha Kirigaya	
2013	Tamayura – More Aggressive	Fū Sawatari	
2013	Date A Live	Kotori Itsuka	
2013	A Certain Scientific Railgun S	Kana Hazamaya	
2013	High School DxD New	Koneko Tōjo	
2013	Mangirl!	Sayuri Misono	
2014	Wizard Barristers: Benmashi Cecil	Moyo Tentō	
2014	Girl Friend BETA	Ichigo Kohinata	
2014	Space Dandy	Mamitas	Episode 2
2014	Sword Art Online II	Leafa/Suguha Kirigaya	
2014	Date A Live II	Kotori Itsuka	
2014	Denkigai no Honya-san	Fu Girl	
2014	The Pilot's Love Song	Ariel Albus	
2014	Phi Brain: Kami no Puzzle	Free Cell (young)	
2014	Momo Kyun Sword	Momoko	
2014	Invaders of the Rokujyōma!?	Karama	
2015	The Idolmaster Cinderella Girls	Sachiko Koshimizu	
2015	My Wife is the Student Council President!	Ui Wakana	
2015	Onsen Yōsei Hakone-chan	Ashinoko	
2015	Kantai Collection	Yamato	
2015	World Break: Aria of Curse for a Holy Swordsman	Satsuki Ranjō	
2015	Dog Days	Eclair Martinozzi	
2015	High School DxD BorN	Koneko Tōjo	
2015	Magic Kaito 1412	Princess Anne	Episode 15
2015	Lance N' Masques	Hō Yuifon	
2015	The Asterisk War	Pham Thi Tram	
2016	Dagashi Kashi	Hotaru Shidare	
2016	Divine Gate	Hikari	
2016	The Asterisk War 2nd Season	Pham Thi Tram	
2016	CoCO & NiCO	Oppenheimer, Leon	
2016	My Wife is the Student Council President!+!	Ui Wakana	
2017	Akiba's Trip: The Animation	Denko Busujima	Episode 4
2017	Classroom of the Elite	Kei Karuizawa	
2017	My First Girlfriend Is a Gal	Yui Kashii	
2017	Tsugumomo	Kasumi Kagami	
2018	Citrus	Yuzu Aihara	
2018	Dagashi Kashi 2	Hotaru Shidare	
2018	High School DxD Hero	Koneko Tōjo	
2018	Million Arthur	Yamaneko Arthur	also 2019
2018	Sword Art Online: Alicization	Leafa/Suguha Kirigaya	
2018	Ms. Koizumi Loves Ramen Noodles	Koizumi	
2018	Pop Team Epic	Pipimi	Episode 2 Part A
2018	The Master of Ragnarok & Blesser of Einherjar	Christina	
2019	Boogiepop and Others	Minako Yurihara	
2019	Date A Live III	Kotori Itsuka	
2019	Hensuki: Are You Willing to Fall in Love with a Pervert, as Long as She's a Cutie?	Sayuki Tokihara	
2019	How Clumsy you are, Miss Ueno	Minamine	
2019	Kakegurui XX	Erimi Mushibami	
2019	Magical Girl Spec-Ops Asuka	Chisato Yonamine	
2019	The Quintessential Quintuplets	Nino Nakano	
2020	Bofuri	Frederica	
2020	Magia Record: Puella Magi Madoka Magica Side Story	Alina Gray	
2020	A Certain Scientific Railgun	Kana Hazamaya (ep21)	
2020	Noblesse	Erga Kenesis Di Raskreia	
2020	Our Last Crusade or the Rise of a New World	Risya In Empire	
2020	Peter Grill and the Philosopher's Time	Mimi Alpacas	
2020	Tsugu Tsugumomo	Kasumi Kagami	
2020	Uzaki-chan Wants to Hang Out!	Ami Asai	
2020	Yo-kai Watch Jam - Yo-kai Academy Y: Close Encounters of the N Kind	Emma Daiouji	
2021	Ancient Girl's Frame	Reiu Minamiya	
2021	Full Dive	Reona Kisaragi	
2021	Girlfriend, Girlfriend	Rika Hoshizaki	
2021	I'm Standing on a Million Lives Season 2	Yana	
2021	Megaton Musashi	Yūka Nishino	
2021	So I'm a Spider, So What?	Sophia Keren/Negishi Shouko	
2021	The Detective Is Already Dead	Nagisa Natsunagi	
2021	The Quintessential Quintuplets 2nd Season	Nino Nakano	
2021	The World Ends with You the Animation	Rhyme	
2021	World's End Harem	Karen Kamiya	
2022	Akiba Maid War	Wuv-Wuv Moonbeam Manager	
2022	Arknights: Prelude To Dawn	W	
2022	Bleach: Thousand-Year Blood War	Bambietta Basterbine	
2022	Classroom of the Elite 2nd Season	Kei Karuizawa	
2022	Date A Live IV	Kotori Itsuka	
2022	I'm the Villainess, So I'm Taming the Final Boss	Selena Gilbert	
2022	Kantai Collection: Let's Meet at Sea	Yamato	
2022	Love Flops	Amelia Irving	
2022	Miss Kuroitsu from the Monster Development Department	Immortal Camula	
2022	My Master Has No Tail	Enshi Kirino	
2022	Peter Grill and the Philosopher's Time: Super Extra	Mimi Alpacas	
2022	Pokémon Ultimate Journeys: The Series	Lisia	
2022	Uzaki-chan Wants to Hang Out! Season 2	Asai Ami	
2023	Bofuri 2nd Season	Frederica	
2023	Frieren	Aura	
2023	Girlfriend, Girlfriend 2nd Season	Rika Hoshizaki	
2023	I Got a Cheat Skill in Another World and Became Unrivaled in the Real World, Too	Kaede Kazama	
2023	Kubo Won't Let Me Be Invisible	Tamao Taira	
2023	The Legendary Hero Is Dead!	Anri Haysworth	
2023	The Masterful Cat Is Depressed Again Today	Yume	
2023	The Quintessential Quintuplets Special	Nino Nakano	Summer 2023 Shaft Animation
2023	The Tale of the Outcasts	Wisteria	
2024	Classroom of the Elite 3rd Season	Kei Karuizawa	
2024	Date a Live V	Kotori Itsuka	
2024	The Café Terrace and Its Goddesses 2nd Season	Ririka Chiyoda	
2025	Hell Teacher: Jigoku Sensei Nube	Zashiki-Warashi	
2025	I'm the Evil Lord of an Intergalactic Empire!	Nias Carlin	
2025	My Hero Academia: Vigilantes	Miu	
2025	The Unaware Atelier Master	Sina	
2026	Mistress Kanan Is Devilishly Easy	Yui Rorikawa	
2026	The 100 Girlfriends Who Really, Really, Really, Really, Really Love You	Nadeshiko Yamato	Season 3

=== Video games ===
==== 2011 ====
- The Legend of Heroes: Trails to Azure – Shirley Orlando

==== 2012 ====
- Kingdom Hearts 3D: Dream Drop Distance – Rhyme
- Persona 4 Arena – Labrys

==== 2013 ====
- Drakengard 3 – Four
- Macross 30: The Voice that Connects the Galaxy – Mei Leeron, Mia Sakaki
- Sword Art Online: Infinity Moment – Leafa
- Date a Live: Rinne Utopia – Kotori Itsuka

==== 2014 ====
- Dengeki Bunko: Fighting Climax – Leafa, Kirino Kōsaka
- Sword Art Online: Hollow Fragment – Leafa
- Date a Live: Arusu Install – Kotori Istuka

==== 2015 ====
- Deemo: The Last Recital – Little Girl / Alice
- Dengeki Bunko: Fighting Climax Ignition – Leafa, Kousaka Kirino
- Digimon Story: Cyber Sleuth – Tawa Reiko
- Megadimension Neptunia VII – B-Sha
- Sword Art Online: Lost Song – Leafa
- Date a Live: Rio Reincarnation – Kotori Itsuka

==== 2016 ====
- Accel World vs. Sword Art Online: Millennium Twilight – Leafa
- Dragon Quest Heroes II – Jessica
- World of Final Fantasy – Tama
- Sword Art Online: Hollow Realization – Leafa
- Alternative Girls – Miyaka Yuki

==== 2017 ====
- Accel World vs. Sword Art Online: Millennium Twilight – Leafa
- Project Tokyo Dolls – Aya
- The Legend of Heroes: Trails of Cold Steel III – Shirley Orlando
- Xenoblade Chronicles 2 – Zenobia

==== 2018 ====
- BlazBlue: Cross Tag Battle – Labrys
- Puella Magi Madoka Magica Side Story: Magia Record – Alina Gray
- Sdorica – Alice, Masked Girl
- Sword Art Online: Fatal Bullet – Leafa
- Master of Eternity – Jeanie
- Han-gyaku-Sei Million Arthur – Wildcat Arthur
- Million Arthur: Arcana Blood – Wildcat Arthur
- Dragalia Lost – Natalie
- Shojo Kageki Revue Starlight: Re LIVE – Misora Kano
- The Legend of Heroes: Trails of Cold Steel IV – Shirley Orlando (non-playable)

==== 2019 ====
- Arknights — W
- SoulWorker – Chii Aruel

==== 2020 ====
- Another Eden – Altena
- Bleach: Brave Souls – Bambietta Basterbine
- Date a Live: Ren Dystopia – Kotori Itsuka

==== 2021 ====
- Shin Megami Tensei V – Nuwa

==== 2022 ====
- Alchemy Stars – Nina
- Armada Girls – Ghost Ship X
- Goddess of Victory: Nikke – Privaty, Nero
- Granblue Fantasy – Cupitan
- Mobile Legends: Bang Bang - Melissa

==== 2023 ====
- Sword Art Online: Last Recollection – Leafa
- Genshin Impact – Chiori

==== 2025 ====
- Zenless Zone Zero – Dialyn

==== Unknown date ====
- Honkai Impact 3rd – Frederika Nikola Tesla
- Nora to Toki no Kōbō: Kiri no Mori no Majo – Nora Brundle
- Ore no Imōto ga Konna ni Kawaii Wake ga Nai Portable – Kirino Kōsaka
- Rune Factory 4 – Dolce
- Pokémon Black 2 and White 2 – Bel/Bianca (Black 2 White 2 Animated Trailer)
- Trinity Universe – Tsubaki
- The Idolmaster Cinderella Girls – Sachiko Koshimizu
- Call of Duty: Black Ops II – Anderson (Japanese Dub Version)
- Kantai Collection – Yamato, Akigumo, Yūgumo, Makigumo, and Naganami
- K-On! Hōkago Live!! – Azusa Nakano
- Phantasy Star Online 2 – Io
- Dragon Quest VIII and Dragon Quest: Heroes – Jessica Albert
- High School DxD New Fight – Koneko Tōjo
- The Legend of Heroes: Trails to Azure – Shirley Orlando
- Mobile Suit Gundam Side Story: Missing Link – Annerose Rosenheim
- Mobile Suit Gundam Extreme Vs Full Boost – Sthesia Awar
- Mobile Suit Gundam Extreme Vs Maxi Boost – Sthesia Awar, Sthesia Awar Acht, Sthesia Awar Primo, Sthesia Awar Nono, Sthesia Awar Sesto
- Little Noah – Noah
- Figure Fantasy – Rinn

=== OVA/OAD ===
- Kissxsis – Ako Suminoe

=== Tokusatsu ===
- Kaitou Sentai Lupinranger VS Keisatsu Sentai Patranger (2018) – Goche Ru Medou (eps. 1 – 8, 10 – 48)
- Kaitou Sentai Lupinranger VS Keisatsu Sentai Patranger en Film (2018) – Goche Ru Medou

=== Drama CD ===
- Love DNA XX – Aoi
- Ore no Imōto ga Konna ni Kawaii Wake ga Nai – Kirino Kōsaka
- Tsuki Tsuki! – Nazuna Nanjō
- Watashi ni xx Shinasai! – Mami Mizuno
- Citrus – Yuzu Aihara
- Mo Dao Zu Shi/Ma Dou So Shi – Jiang Yanli/Kou Enri

=== Anime films ===
Year	Title	Role	Other notes
2010	Light Novel no Tanoshii Kakikata	Yūna Ichigo	Live action (as actress)
2011	K-On! Movie	Azusa Nakano	
2015	Date A Live: Mayuri Judgement	Kotori Itsuka	
2015	Girls und Panzer der Film	Alice Shimada	Movie Part 4 and Movie Part 5
2017	Sword Art Online The Movie: Ordinal Scale	Leafa/Suguha Kirigaya	
2022	Deemo: Memorial Keys	Alice	
2022	The Quintessential Quintuplets Movie	Nino Nakano	
2022	Idol Bu Show	Nagaho Mori	
2024	Ganbatte Ikimasshoi	Umeko Terao	
2027	Date a Live F: Last Date	Kotori Itsuka	

=== Dubbing ===
==== Live-action ====
- Genius, 10-year-old Hans Albert Einstein (Alice Edwards)
- Jexi, Cate Finnegan (Alexandra Shipp)

==== Animation ====
- The Angry Birds Movie 2, Silver
- Wish, Bazeema

=== Others ===
- Citrus (manga) – Yuzu Aihara (promotional videos)

== Discography ==
=== Albums ===
Year	Album details	Catalog No.	Peak Oricon chart positions
2013	apple symphony: Released: April 10, 2013; Label: Pony Canyon; Format: CD	PCCG-1331 & PCCG-1332 (Limited Edition), PCCG-1333 (Regular Edition)	7
2014	Colore Serenata: Released: November 19, 2014; Label: Pony Canyon; Format: CD	PCCG-1435 & PCCG-1436 (Limited Edition), PCCG-1437 (Regular Edition)	18
2016	Lyrical Concerto: Released: November 2, 2016; Label: Pony Canyon; Format: CD	PCCG-1553 & PCCG-1554 (Limited Edition), PCCG-1555 (Regular Edition)	15
2021	Méli-mélo meli mellow: Released: September 15, 2021; Label: Pony Canyon; Format: CD	PCCG-02050 (Limited Edition), PCCG-02051 (Regular Edition)	

=== Compilation albums ===
Year	Album details	Catalog No.	Peak Oricon chart positions
2017	apple feuille: Released: November 29, 2017; Label: Pony Canyon; Format: CD	PCCG-1629 (CD + BD), PCCG-1630 (CD + DVD), PCCG-1631 (Regular Edition)	14

=== Singles ===
Year	Single details	Catalog No.	Peak Oricon chart positions	Album
2012	Sinfonia! Sinfonia!!!: Released: April 11, 2012; Label: Pony Canyon; Format: CD	LACM-1272 (Limited Edition), LACM-70136 (Regular Edition)	7	apple symphony
2012	Onpu no Kuni no Alice (♪の国のアリス): Released: September 12, 2012; Label: Pony Canyon; Format: CD	LACM-1298 (Limited Edition), LACM-70162 (Regular Edition)	10	apple symphony
2013	Jiku Tours (時空ツアーズ): Released: January 9, 2013; Label: Pony Canyon; Format: CD	LACM-1318 (Limited Edition), LACM-70171 (Regular Edition)	10	apple symphony
2013	Shumatsu Cinderella (週末シンデレラ): Released: December 4, 2013; Label: Pony Canyon; Format: CD	LACM-1376 (Limited Edition), LACM-70198 (Regular Edition)	16	Colore Serenata
2014	Wonderful World (わんだふるワールド): Released: June 4, 2014; Label: Pony Canyon; Format: CD	LACM-1404 (Limited Edition), LACM-70212 (Regular Edition)	11	Colore Serenata
2014	Kajirikake no Ringo (齧りかけの林檎): Released: October 15, 2014; Label: Pony Canyon; Format: CD	LACM-1427 (Limited Edition), LACM-70222 (Regular Edition)	15	Colore Serenata

=== Music in anime ===
As the voice actor for Azusa Nakano in K-On!, she is a member of the band Hokago Tea Time, and has participated in seven singles and one album.

- Hōkago Teatime (放課後ティータイム) ranked No. 1 on Oricon albums charts.
- "Azusa Nakano" ("中野 梓") image song CD of the eponymous character, ranked No. 3 on Oricon singles charts.
- "Go! Go! Maniac" ranked No. 1 on Oricon singles charts.
- "Listen!!" ranked No. 2 on Oricon singles charts.
- "Pure Pure Heart" (ぴゅあぴゅあはーと) ranked No. 4 on Oricon singles charts.
- "Utauyo!! Miracle" ranked No. 3 on Oricon singles charts.
- "No, Thank You!" ranked No. 2 on Oricon singles charts.
- "Gohan wa Okazu/U&I" ranked No. 3 on Oricon singles charts.

She additionally performed Hey! Calorie Queen (Hey!カロリーQueen), the ending theme for Dagashi Kashi. It was ranked No. 19 on Oricon singles charts.
