= Rina Hidaka =

Japanese voice actress (born 1994)

- 日高 里菜
- Born: June 15, 1994 (age 32); Chiba Prefecture, Japan
- Occupations: Actress; Voice actress
- Years active: 2000–present
- Agent: StarCrew
- Notable credits: Accel World as Yuniko Kōzuki / Scarlet Rain; Sword Art Online as Silica; Inu × Boku SS as Ririchiyo Shirakiin; That Time I Got Reincarnated as a Slime as Milim Nava; The Rising of the Shield Hero as Filo; Kuma Kuma Kuma Bear as Noire Foschurose; My Stepmom's Daughter Is My Ex as Yume Irido; Tropical-Rouge! Precure as Laura / Cure La Mer; The Eminence in Shadow as Claire Kagenou; Classroom of the Elite as Arisu Sakayanagi
- Spouse: Yuma Uchida (m. 2024)
- Children: 1
- Relatives: Maaya Uchida (sister-in-law); Kaito Ishikawa (brother-in-law)

Rina Hidaka (日高 里菜, Hidaka Rina) (born June 15, 1994) is a Japanese actress who specializes in voice acting. She is affiliated with StarCrew.

== Career ==
Hidaka joined the entertainment agency at the age of five. She debuted in the variety show Appare Sanma-daisensei, which was hosted by Sanma Akashiya, as one of the regular members in 2002. She debuted as a voice actress in 2008.

== Personal life ==
On January 1, 2024, she announced her marriage to fellow voice actor Yuma Uchida. On July 19, 2026, she announced through her personal social media account that she had given birth to her first child, a daughter.

== Filmography ==
=== Anime ===
2008

- Michiko & Hatchin as Michiko (young)
- Porphy no Nagai Tabi as Rebecca (young)
- xxxHolic: Kei as Kohane Tsuyuri

2009

- A Certain Magical Index as Last Order
- Kon'nichiwa Anne: Before Green Gables as Anne Shirley
- Haruka Nogizaka's Secret: Purezza as Miu Fujinomiya

2010

- A Certain Magical Index II as Last Order
- Bakuman as Mina Azuki
- Katanagatari as Konayuki Itezora
- Ladies versus Butlers! as Mimina Ōsawa
- Major (6th season) as Sunday
- Mayoi Neko Overrun! as Honoka (ep 10)
- Star Driver as Mizuno Yō
- The Legend of the Legendary Heroes as Bueka
- The World God Only Knows as Lime (ep 7)

2011

- The Mystic Archives of Dantalian as Patricia Nash (ep 6)
- Dream Eater Merry as Minato Kisaragi (ep 3)
- Children Who Chase Lost Voices as Mana
- Ro-Kyu-Bu! as Airi Kashii
- Sengoku Otome: Momoiro Paradox as Yoshino "Hideyoshi" Hide
- Tiger & Bunny as Kaede Kaburagi

2012

- Accel World as Yuniko Kozuki
- Campione! as Shizuka Kusanagi
- Inu x Boku SS as Ririchiyo Shirakiin
- Moe Can Change! as Kanna Moegi
- Nakaimo - My Sister Is Among Them! as Mei Sagara
- Sword Art Online as Silica
- YuruYuri as Hanako Ōmuro
- Waiting in the Summer as Rinon
- Sword Art Offline as Silica

2013

- Arpeggio of Blue Steel ~Ars Nova~ as I-400
- Bakuman. 3 as Mina Azuki
- Galactic Armored Fleet Majestic Prince as Anna, Mayu
- Galilei Donna as Hozuki Ferrari
- Love Lab as Nana Ichikawa
- Ro-Kyu-Bu! SS as Airi Kashii
- Sasami-san@Ganbaranai as Tamamo-no-Mae
- Servant × Service as Kanon Momoi
- The Severing Crime Edge as Emily Redhands
- Strike the Blood as Nagisa Akatsuki
- Tamako Market as Anko Kitashirakawa
- Sword Art Online: Extra Edition as Silica

2014

- Black Bullet as Enju Aihara
- Captain Earth as Akari Yomatsuri
- Girl Friend BETA as Nae Yuki
- If Her Flag Breaks as Sakura
- Sword Art Online II as Silica

2015

- Ultimate Otaku Teacher as Kanan Chinami
- To Love Ru Darkness 2nd as Nemesis
- Food Wars! Shokugeki no Soma as Urara Kawashima, Yua Sasaki
- Kantai Collection as Mutsuki, Kisaragi, Yayoi, Mochizuki, Satsuki
- Rin-ne as Hanako-san who appears in Friday the 13th
- The Rolling Girls as Yukina Kosaka
- Unlimited Fafnir as Iris Freyja
- YuruYuri San Hai! as Hanako Ōmuro
- Show by Rock!! as Rosia

2016

- And you thought there is never a girl online? as Ako Tamaki / Ako
- Gate: Jieitai Kano Chi nite, Kaku Tatakaeri as Sherry Tyueri
- Rilu Rilu Fairilu as Sumire
- Magical Girl Raising Project as Hardgore Alice / Ako Hatoda
- Food Wars! Shokugeki no Soma: The Second Plate as Urara Kawashima, Yua Sasaki
- Show by Rock!! Short!! as Rosia
- Show by Rock!! # as Rosia
- Pokémon Generations as Iris

2017

- Schoolgirl Strikers as Satoka Sumihara
- Armed Girl's Machiavellism as Warabi Hanasaka
- Senki Zesshō Symphogear AXZ as Prelati
- Dive!! as Miu Nomura
- Made in Abyss as Mio
- Angel's 3Piece! as Kurumi Nukui
- Classroom of the Elite as Arisu Sakayanagi
- Food Wars! Shokugeki no Soma: The Third Plate as Urara Kawashima, Yua Sasaki

2018

- The Ryuo's Work Is Never Done! as Ai Hinatsuru
- Märchen Mädchen as Lynne Daves
- Ms. Vampire Who Lives in My Neighborhood as Sakuya Kurai
- Food Wars! Shokugeki no Soma: The Third Plate Part 2 as Urara Kawashima
- A Certain Magical Index III as Last Order
- Boarding School Juliet as Kochō Wan
- Sword Art Online: Alicization as Silica
- Million Arthur as Bethor

2019

- That Time I Got Reincarnated as a Slime as Milim Nava
- The Rising of the Shield Hero as Filo
- Hensuki: Are You Willing to Fall in Love with a Pervert, as Long as She's a Cutie? as Yuika Koga
- A Certain Scientific Accelerator as Last Order
- Kengan Ashura as Elena Robinson
- High School Prodigies Have It Easy Even In Another World as Ringo Ōhoshi
- Val × Love as Mutsumi Saotome
- Food Wars! Shokugeki no Soma: The Fourth Plate as Urara Kawashima

2020

- A Certain Scientific Railgun T as Last Order
- Isekai Quartet 2 as Filo
- Kaguya-sama: Love Is War? as Kobachi Osaragi
- Date A Live Fragment: Date A Bullet as Panie Ibusuki
- Is It Wrong to Try to Pick Up Girls in a Dungeon? III as Wiene
- Kuma Kuma Kuma Bear as Noire Foschurose
- Princess Connect! Re:Dive as Mimi / Mimi Akane
- Warlords of Sigrdrifa as Nono Kazuura
- Wandering Witch: The Journey of Elaina as Odoko

2021

- Combatants Will Be Dispatched! as Flaming Belial
- Cute Executive Officer as Najimu Mujina
- Komi Can't Communicate as Ren Yamai
- Otherside Picnic as Kozakura
- Rumble Garanndoll as Hayate Makami
- Shaman King as Pirika Usui
- Show by Rock!! Stars!! as Rosia
- That Time I Got Reincarnated as a Slime Season 2 as Milim Nava
- Tropical-Rouge! Precure as Laura / Cure La Mer
- Vivy: Fluorite Eye's Song as Ophelia
- Vlad Love as Mai Vlad Transylvania

2022

- Aharen-san Is Indecipherable as Eru Aharen
- Boruto as Osuka Kamakura
- Classroom of the Elite 2nd Season as Arisu Sakayanagi
- Kaguya-sama: Love Is War – Ultra Romantic as Kobachi Osaragi
- Komi Can't Communicate Season 2 as Ren Yamai
- Love After World Domination as Haru Arisugawa
- Miss Shachiku and the Little Baby Ghost as Yūrei-chan
- My Stepmom's Daughter Is My Ex as Yume Irido
- Princess Connect! Re:Dive Season 2 as Mimi / Mimi Akane
- Shikimori's Not Just a Cutie as Hachimitsu
- The Eminence in Shadow as Claire Kagenou
- The Rising of the Shield Hero 2 as Filo
- Tokyo 24th Ward as Kozue Shirakaba

2023

- A Playthrough of a Certain Dude's VRMMO Life as Elizabeth
- Cute Executive Officer R as Najimu Mujina
- I Got a Cheat Skill in Another World and Became Unrivaled in the Real World, Too as Yuty
- Kuma Kuma Kuma Bear Punch! as Noire Foschurose
- Pole Princess!! as Sana Murafuji
- Ragna Crimson as Starlia Lese
- Rail Romanesque 2 as Torako
- Shangri-La Frontier as Emul
- Shy as Kufufu Kekerakera
- The Rising of the Shield Hero 3 as Filo
- The Vexations of a Shut-In Vampire Princess as Gertrude
- Tomo-chan Is a Girl! as Misuzu Gundo

2024

- Chained Soldier as Naon Yuno
- Classroom of the Elite 3rd Season as Arisu Sakayanagi
- Delico's Nursery as Uru Delico
- 'Tis Time for "Torture," Princess as Mao Mao
- Villainess Level 99 as Eleonora Hillrose

2025

- Scooped Up by an S-Rank Adventurer! as Yui
- See You Tomorrow at the Food Court as Yamada
- The Rising of the Shield Hero 4 as Filo

2026

- Even a Replica Can Fall in Love as Kozue Satou
- Ghost Concert: Missing Songs as Cleopatra
- I Want to Love You Till Your Dying Day as Mimi Kagari
- Magical Girl Lyrical Nanoha Exceeds Gun Blaze Vengeance as Setsuna Kuze
- Sirotan as Sheru
- Even Though I'm a Super Timid Noble Girl, I Accepted the Bet from My Cunning Fiancé as Caroline Ramsey
- Nia Liston: The Merciless Maiden as Reliared Silver

2027

- Arcanadea as Yukumo

TBA

- The Eccentric Doctor of the Moon Flower Kingdom as Koyō

=== Tokusatsu ===
2007

- Ultraman Mebius as Takako Hinode (Ep 39)

=== Anime films ===
2016

- Accel World: Infinite Burst as Yuniko Kozuki / Scarlet Rain
- Aikatsu Stars! The Movie as Maori
- KanColle: The Movie as Mutsuki, Kisaragi, Ryūjō

2017

- Sword Art Online The Movie: Ordinal Scale as Silica
- Trinity Seven the Movie: The Eternal Library and the Alchemist Girl as Lilim

2021

- Tropical-Rouge! Pretty Cure the Movie: The Snow Princess and the Miraculous Ring! as Laura / Cure La Mer
- Sword Art Online Progressive: Aria of a Starless Night as Silica

2022

- Kaguya-sama: Love Is War – The First Kiss That Never Ends as Kobachi Osaragi

2023

- Pretty Cure All Stars F as Laura / Cure La Mer

=== Video games ===
2012

- Borderlands 2 as Angel (Jennifer Greene)
- Little Witch Parfait: Kuroneko Mahouten Monogatari as Parfait Sucreal

2013

- Kantai Collection as Ryūjō, Mutsuki class
- Sword Art Online: Infinity Moment as Silica
- Oboro Muramasa as Okoi
- ''Smile☆Shooter as Kokoro Toumi

2014

- Dengeki Bunko: Fighting Climax as Enju Aihara, Last Order, Airi Kashii
- Sword Art Online: Hollow Fragment as Silica

2015

- Dengeki Bunko: Fighting Climax Ignition as Enju Aihara, Last Order, Airi Kashii, Ako Tamaki
- Sword Art Online: Lost Song as Silica
- Granblue Fantasy as Yaia
- Maiden Craft as Neiko Kuonji

2016

- Sword Art Online: Hollow Realization as Silica
- Megadimension Neptunia VII as K-Sha
- Girl's Frontline as Ribeyrolles, ART556

2017

- Accel World vs. Sword Art Online: Millennium Twilight as Silica, Yuniko Kozuki / Scarlet Rain
- Fire Emblem Heroes as Veronica
- Xenoblade Chronicles 2 as Ursula

2018

- Princess Connect Re:Dive as Mimi / Mimi Akane
- Master of Eternity as Puris
- League of Legends as Tristana

2019

- Azur Lane as KMS Z19 Hermann Künne, KMS Z20 Karl Glaster, KMS Z21 Wilhelm Heidkamp, USS Anchorage
- Dragalia Lost as Veronica

2021

- Granblue Fantasy as Catura
- Akashic Chronicle as Layla
- The Idolmaster: Starlit Season as Aya
- Cookie Run: Kingdom as Strawberry Crepe Cookie

2022

- Blue Archive as Hinata Wakaba
- Goddess of Victory: Nikke as Neon

2023

- Honkai: Star Rail as Clara
- Sword Art Online: Last Recollection as Silica

2026

- Arknights: Endfield as Rossina Wulfperl Luppino
- Nekopara: Sekai Connect as Mikan
