= Sachika Misawa =

Japanese voice actress

- 三澤 紗千香
- Born: January 13, 1993 (age 33); Yamanashi Prefecture, Japan
- Occupations: Voice actress; singer
- Years active: 2009–present
- Agents: Style Cube (2009–2015); Space Craft Entertainment (2015–2020); Stardust Promotion (2021–2023); Freelance (2023–present)
- Height: 161 cm (5 ft 3 in)
- Musical career
- Genres: J-pop; anison
- Instrument: Vocals
- Label: Universal Japan

Sachika Misawa (三澤 紗千香, Misawa Sachika; born January 13, 1993) is a freelance Japanese voice actress and singer from Yamanashi Prefecture. As a voice actress, she was previously affiliated with numerous agencies, with the recent being Stardust Promotion, departing from the agency in March 2023. As a singer, she is signed to Universal Music Japan. Some of her main roles include Kuroyukihime in Accel World, Sakura Bakushin O in Umamusume: Pretty Derby, Minami Azuma in Tokyo ESP, Rin in the music video for "Shelter", Yukari Kohinata in Locodol, Sakura "Cosmos" Akino in Oresuki, and Moca Aoba in BanG Dream!.

== Biography ==
Misawa began her voice acting career after winning the "Kadokawa×Up-Front Style Idol Seiyū Audition 2008" competition in February 2009. She debuted in the anime Shangri-La, voicing the character Yuri Gamagori. She graduated from high school in March 2011 and entered university in April of that same year. She finally graduated from university in March 2016. She took a part-time job as a shrine maiden at the age of 20, having been fascinated with it since her childhood. Despite already being preoccupied with voice acting and furthering her studies, she accepted it as a lifelong opportunity.

In 2012, she landed a major role as Kuroyukihime in Accel World. Her debut single, "Unite", released on August 1, 2012 by Warner Bros. Home Entertainment Japan, was used as the anime's second ending song.

She released her debut album Polaris on February 20, 2013. The album contains music used in A Certain Magical Index: The Movie – The Miracle of Endymion. Misawa's second single, "Links" (リンクス, Rinkusu), was released on August 21, 2013, and was used as second ending theme for the anime television series A Certain Scientific Railgun S, while the B-side, "Infinia" (インフィニア, Infinia), was used as an ending song in the penultimate episode. Misawa's third single, Faith, was released on 6 August 2014 and used as the ending song of Argevollen. In 2016, she released a greatest hits album titled -Infinite Selection-.

While previously she communicated mostly on her official blog, she opened a Twitter account on 13 January 2019, on her 26th birthday.

During her birthday event in early 2020, Misawa announced that she would be releasing new album in the spring of 2020 under a big label, which was later revealed to be Universal Music Japan. The single was released on April 29, 2020. She also announced her official fan club, named "Sachi Cafe", which later became defunct after she left her agency.

Misawa released her second single on September 30, 2020 titled "I'm here/With You". She wrote the lyrics and composed the music herself for "I'm here".

She released her first major original album I Am Me under Universal Music Japan on December 23, 2020. In this album, she wrote the lyrics and composed the music herself for "Aoi Namida".

On December 26, 2020, Misawa announced she was leaving Space Craft Entertainment at end of December 2020, and will work freelance after leaving the agency. She used to run a YouTube channel called "Misawa no Sacchanel" (三澤のさっちゃんねる), but the channel was shut down together with her blog "Sachika Diary" (さちかにっき) after she left the agency.

She joined Stardust Promotion on April 1, 2021. She re-opened her fan club with the new name "Seeker" on June 10, 2021 and re-opened her official blog on Line Blog on June 24, 2021.

She released a mini-album Shin-kokyu (深呼吸) consisting of five songs on December 22, 2021, roughly one year after her previous album. She wrote and composed three songs from the album: "Utau yo" (歌うよ), "Toumei Ningen" (透明人間), and "Hitomi" (瞳). In an interview with lyrics and music news site UtaTen, she mentioned that all of the songs in this album were intentionally made to be exactly three minutes in length because of the hourglass duration included in her limited edition box from Universal Music Japan.

During her birthday event in 2022, she announced her first solo tour, which was held in Osaka on March 6, 2022, and Tokyo on April 3, 2022.

In February 2022, she had her live-action television drama debut in ''Kasouken no Onna (科捜研の女)'' Season 21. She narrated the audiobook for the novel Oshi, Moyu (推し、燃ゆ) which released on February 8, 2022.

Misawa revealed in June 2022 that she would be taking a hiatus from her activities due to poor health. As a result, her scheduled concert, "Misawa Sachika 2nd Live Tour 2022", as well as her fan event, "Misawa Sachika FC Fan Meeting", have been canceled. She returned to activity in August 2022. In November 2022, due to poor physical condition, her agency announced that she would be taking break from updating Social Media for time being.

Her sample voice is used for the voice synthesis software "Seishunkei Song Voice CeVIO AI Futaba Minato" which was released on December 2, 2022

She released her best album entitled "REMEDY" to celebrate 10 years since her CD debut on December 21, 2022. This album consists of 12 songs which included 1 new song.

On March 15, 2023, Misawa announced she is leaving Stardust Promotion by March 31, 2023. With she leaving the agency, her fan club and official blog was also closed.

== Current and past activities ==
She previously had a weekly solo radio program called ''Misawa Sachika no Radio wo Kiku Janne!'' (三澤紗千香のラジオを聴くじゃんね！) which aired on 超! A&G+ on every Tuesday 2 am (Monday 26 pm as written in Japanese). However, this program was stopped after she went on hiatus in June 2022.

She also hosted the BanG Dream! weekly radio show Sunset Studio with fellow Afterglow member Hisako Kanemoto. She also had a biweekly radio program called Nashiraji (梨ラジ) together with Natsumi Takamori which promotes Yamanashi prefecture, which ran from October 10, 2019, until November 22, 2021. She co-hosted Oresuki Radio with radio personality Takeshi Washizaki. She also has a weekly radio program called "Let's Become a Novelist Navi" with Junta Terashima since April 2019 before she graduated from this radio program on September 25, 2022. This radio show introduced some works from the website Let's Become Novelist (小説家になろう) via live reading,

Aside from the radio, she also had monthly game streaming programs with Komagata Yuri which airs on Niconico called "Misawa Sachika & Komagata Yuri's Sachiyuri Game Commentary Club ~ Press Any Button! " (三澤紗千香・駒形友梨のさちゆりゲーム実況部 〜Press Any Button! ).

She used to have her personal YouTube channel in addition to her artist YouTube channel from October 14, 2021, until she left Stardust Promotion agency and the channel was closed subsequently.

She was also part of the Idol舞Show as Hanazono Yuika in No Princess Sub-Unit before she graduated from the group on 22 June 2020.

== Filmography ==
=== Anime ===
2009

- Shangri-La as Yuri Gamagori
- Yumeiro Patissiere as Cafe; Miki Mori

2010

- Kaitō Reinya as Beautiful lady (ep 11); Fan; Sparrow (ep 6)
- Yumeiro Patissiere SP as Cafe; Miki Mori

2012

- Accel World as Kuroyukihime
- Campione! as Arianna
- Nakaimo – My Sister Is Among Them! as Student (ep 2)
- Saki Achiga-hen episode of Side-A as Hiroko Funakubo (ep. 13 onwards)

2013

- Chronicles of the Going Home Club as Reina Takamodo
- Kin-iro Mosaic as Female classmate A
- A Certain Magical Index: The Movie – The Miracle of Endymion as Arisa Meigo
- Tenshi no Drop as Momoko
- Fantasista Doll as Kagami Totori

2014

- Riddle Story of Devil as Chitaru Namatame
- Aldnoah.Zero as Rayet Areash
- Witch Craft Works as Witch A
- Tokyo ESP as Minami Azuma
- Bakumatsu Rock as Ikumatsu
- Locodol as Yukari Kohinata
- 47 Prefectural Dog R as Yamanishi Dog

2015

- Aldnoah.Zero 2 as Rayet Areash
- Castle Town Dandelion as Sachiko Yonezawa

2016

- Nyanbo! as Kijitora
- Accel World: Infinite Burst as Kuroyukihime
- Shelter (music video) as Rin

2017

- Sakurada Reset as Seika Nonoo
- Tomica Hyper Rescue Drive Head Kidō Kyūkyū Keisatsu as Mikoto Ishino

2018

- BanG Dream! Girls Band Party! Pico as Moca Aoba
- Butlers: Chitose Momotose Monogatari as Tenna Kisaragi
- Magical Girl Ore as Sakuyo Mikage

2019

- BanG Dream! 2nd Season as Moca Aoba
- BanG Dream! Film Live as Moca Aoba
- Bakugan: Battle Planet as Kravitz
- Oresuki as Sakura "Cosmos" Akino

2020

- BanG Dream! 3rd Season as Moca Aoba
- BanG Dream! Girls Band Party! Pico: Ohmori as Moca Aoba
- Iwa-Kakeru! Climbing Girls as Mimu Takahashi
- Bakugan: Armored Alliance as Kravitz

2021

- BanG Dream! Episode of Roselia II: Song I am. as Moca Aoba
- BanG Dream! Film Live 2nd Stage as Moca Aoba
- BanG Dream! Girls Band Party! Pico Fever! as Moca Aoba
- Umamusume: Pretty Derby Season 2 as Sakura Bakushin O
- Wonder Egg Priority as Kaoru Kurita

2022

- The Yakuza's Guide to Babysitting as Sanae Aoi

=== Video games ===
2013

- Akiba's Trip 2 as Shizuku Tokikaze
- Mugen Souls Z as Syrma
- Sword Art Online: Infinity Moment as Strea

2014

- Dengeki Bunko Fighting Climax as Kuroyukihime
- Bullet Girls
- Sword Art Online: Hollow Fragment as Strea
- Girl Friend Beta as Shiki Nanami

2015

- Honyarara Magic as Hikari Hashimoto
- Sword Art Online: Lost Song as Strea

2016

- Granblue Fantasy as Forte
- Sword Art Online: Hollow Realization as Strea

2017

- Accel World VS Sword Art Online: Millennium Twilight as Kuroyukihime and Strea
- BanG Dream! Girls Band Party! as Moca Aoba
- Infinite Stratos: Archetype Breaker as Loranzine Lorandifilny

2018

- Sword Art Online: Fatal Bullet as Strea
- Master of Eternity as Devi
- Dragon Star Varnir as Charlotta

2019

- Fire Emblem: Three Houses as Hapi
- Engage Princess as Lemres

2020

- Dragalia Lost as Forte

2021

- Touhou Danmaku Kagura as Konpaku Youmu
- Sakura Kakumei as Tenjin Himeka
- Umamusume: Pretty Derby as Sakura Bakushin O
- Azur Lane as Marco Polo
- Guardian Tales as Aisha
- Onsen Musume as Mikasa Sengokuhara
- Fairy Sphere as Houzuki (Sister)
- Cookie Run: Kingdom as Poison Mushroom Cookie

2022

- Echoes of Mana as Mousseline
- Alice Fiction as Archimedes
- Your Majesty as Manya
- Sengoku Sairin as Matsu

2023

- Shironeko Tennis as Linesman Kasumi
- Houchi Shoujo as Hosokawa Gracia

=== Live-Action Television ===
2021

- Kasouken no Onna (科捜研の女) Season21 as Nana Honjo.

== Discography ==
=== Singles ===
Year	Title	Notes
2012	"Unite" (ユナイト)	Second ending of Accel World. It reached 19th on Weekly Oricon Ranking
2013	"Links" (リンクス)	Second ending theme of A Certain Scientific Railgun S. It reached 20th on Weekly Oricon Ranking
2014	"Faith" (フェイト)	Ending song of Argevollen. It reached 39th on Weekly Oricon Ranking
2020	"Kono Te wa" (この手は)	Released on April 29, 2020. It reached 7th on Weekly Oricon Ranking.
2020	"I'm here/With You"	Released on September 30, 2020. It reached 16th on the weekly Oricon ranking with 4,528 sales in the first week

=== Albums ===
Year	title	Notes
2016	-Infinite Selection-	It reached 26th on Weekly Oricon Ranking
2020	I Am Me	First major original album under Universal Music Japan. Released on December 23, 2020. It reached 43rd on Weekly Oricon Ranking
2022	REMEDY	The album consist of 12 songs which included 1 new song. Released on December 21, 2022.

=== Mini albums ===
Year	Title	Notes
2013	Polaris (ポラリス)	contains music used in A Certain Magical Index: The Movie – The Miracle of Endymion. It reached 16th on Weekly Oricon Ranking
2021	"Shin-kokyu" (深呼吸)	Released on December 22, 2021. It reached 19th on the daily Oricon ranking and 39th on weekly Oricon ranking
