= Luna Haruna =

Japanese singer and model (born 1991)

- 春奈 るな
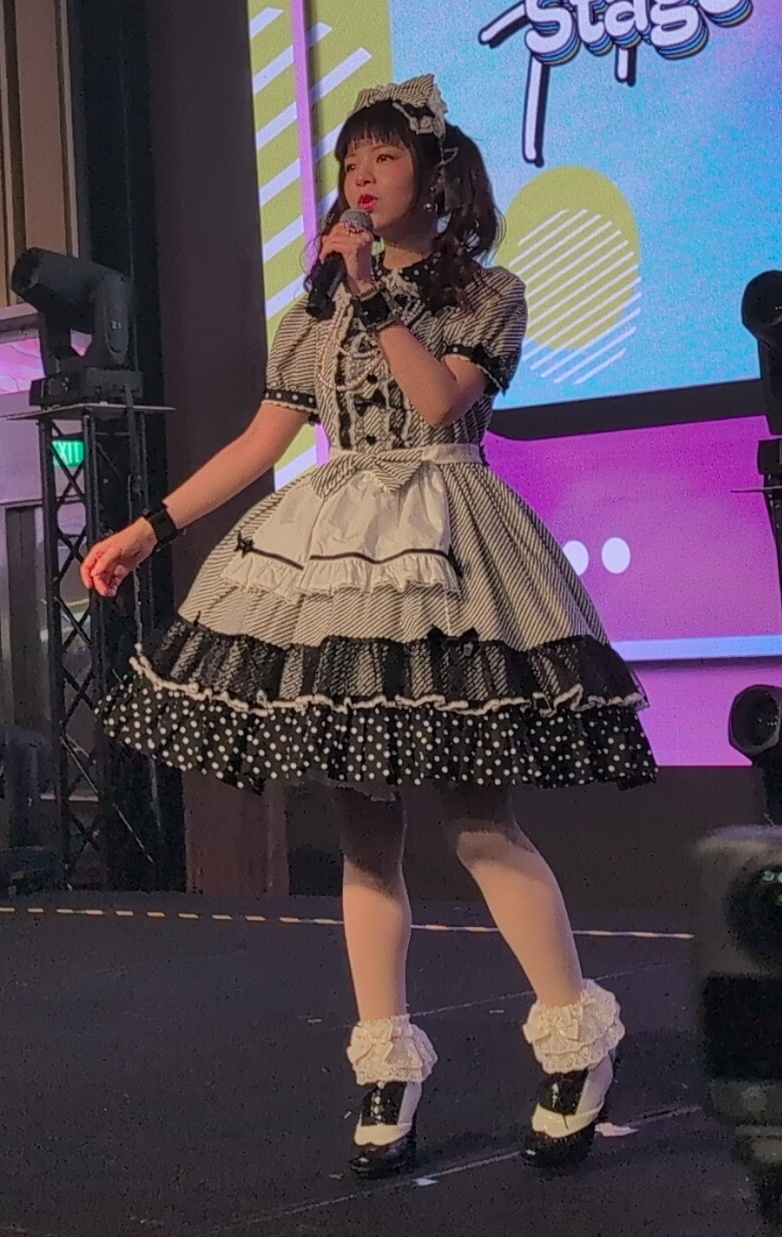
- Luna Haruna at EOY Singapore on 2 January 2026
- Born: Aya Itō; October 11, 1991 (age 34); Tokyo, Japan
- Occupations: Singer; fashion model
- Years active: 2011–present
- Musical career
- Genres: J-pop
- Instrument: Vocals
- Labels: SME Records (2011–2017); Sacra Music (2017–2021); HS Record (2024-present)
- Website: www.harunaluna.jp

Aya Itō (伊藤 彩, Itō Aya; born October 11, 1991), better known by her stage name Luna Haruna (春奈 るな, Haruna Runa) is a Japanese singer and fashion model from Tokyo.

== Biography ==
Luna Haruna was interested in anime and music from a young age. In her first year of junior high school, she became obsessed with Gothic Lolita manga characters, and started to collect Western clothes. In her third year of junior high school, she auditioned for the Internet radio program of Rental Magica, and was selected to perform the opening theme. She became popular as an imoto-kei amateur model in the fashion magazine Kera when she was in her second year of high school, and also did tie-in modelling for Marui. She gained popularity when she became a finalist at the fourth All-Japan Anime Song Grand Prix.

In an interview with Japanese entertainment website Nihongogo, Luna shares her inspiration behind her career "In terms of TV and anime, I grew up watching and singing the songs from Sailor Moon. As for music artists, I was really inspired by Chiaki Ishikawa and also ALI PROJECT. When I watched them perform, I was really amazed by the power of music and song. This really inspired me to become a musician and an artist."

== Career ==
Haruna started singing full-time in 2011, and released her debut single "Sora wa Takaku Kaze wa Utau" (空は高く風は歌う, The Sky is High and the Wind Sings) on May 2, 2012, which is used as the second ending theme to the 2011 anime series: Fate/Zero. Her second single, "Overfly", released on November 28, 2012, was used as the second ending theme to the 2012 anime series Sword Art Online. Her song "Startear" was used as the first ending theme to Sword Art Online's sequel Sword Art Online II, while "Yoru no Niji wo Koete" (夜の虹を越えて, Over the Night Rainbow) was used in the video game Sword Art Online: Lost Song. She also covered the song "Kisaragi Attention" in the 2014 anime series Mekakucity Actors. On January 28, 2015, her seventh single "Kimi-iro Signal" was used as opening theme to Saekano: How to Raise a Boring Girlfriend. Her eighth single "Ripple Effect" was used as ending theme of anime High School Fleet. Her ninth single, "Windia", that released on October 12, 2016, serves as the opening theme of the game Sword Art Online: Hollow Realization.

On Haruna's mini album SxW EP on February 22, 2017, she collaborated with Kotoko, Haruka Tomatsu, Rika Mayama, Sachika Misawa, and Akira from Disacode. The song that she made with Kotoko, "SxW -Soul World-", is used as the theme song of the game Accel World vs. Sword Art Online: Millennium Twilight.

Haruna moved to the Sacra Music record label under Sony Music Entertainment Japan in April 2017. Her tenth single "Stella Breeze" that released on May 3, 2017, is used as the opening theme to anime Saekano: How to Raise a Boring Girlfriend Flat. Her third studio album "Lunarium" was released on June 21, 2017. Her eleventh single "KIRAMEKI☆Lifeline" (KIRAMEKI☆ライフライン, Sparkling Lifeline) was released on November 8, 2017; the song was used as the ending theme of 2017 anime series Urahara, in which she also made her debut as a voice actor. A special single "Justice" was released on June 7, 2018; the song is used as the opening theme to the game Fate/Extella Link. Her twelfth single, "Momoiro Typhoon" (桃色タイフーン; lit. Peach-Colored Typhoon), was released digitally on July 29, 2018, and received a physical release on August 22, 2018; the song is used as the opening theme to anime Yuuna and the Haunted Hot Springs. She released her first "best of" album Luna Joule on November 7, 2018: it included an orchestra version of "Overfly", which was released digitally on October 7, 2018. She released a limited edition digital single titled "Lupa to Aries" (ルパとアリエス) on June 7, 2019. She released her third mini album "Glory Days" on October 23, 2019; the title track is used as the theme song to anime movie Saekano: How to Raise a Boring Girlfriend the Movie: Finale. The album also contains her previous single and her cover song from the anime series itself. Her Thirteenth single "Peace!!!" was released on March 18, 2020; the song was used as the sixth ending song of anime Puzzle & Dragon.

Haruna left Sacra Music label at the end of September 2021 after her contract expired.

On May 5, 2022, she released her first digital single "BLUE ROSE" as independent singer. The song was used as a character song for Cordie from the mobile game Memento Mori.

== Filmography ==
=== Television animation ===
- Urahara (2017) as Rito Suda

=== Live action ===
Movie

- Aru Zombie Shoujo no Sainan (2013) as Alma V

== Discography ==
=== Albums ===
Year	Album details	Peak Oricon chart positions
2013	Oversky: Released: August 21, 2013; Label: SME Records (SECL-1376, SECL-1378, SECL-1380); Format: CD, CD+DVD, CD+BD	16
2015	Candy Lips: Released: March 25, 2015; Label: SME Records (SECL-1664, SECL-1666, SECL-1668); Format: CD, CD+DVD, CD+BD	21
2017	Lunarium: Released: June 26, 2017; Label: Sacra Music (VVCL-1056~7, VVCL-1058~9, VVCL-1060); Format: CD, CD+DVD, CD+BD	27

=== Best albums ===
Year	Album details	Peak Oricon chart positions
2018	Luna Joule: Released: November 7, 2018; Label: Sacra Music (VVCL-1341~4, VVCL-1345~7, VVCL-1348); Format: CD, 2CD+BD, 2CD+BD+T-shirt+Photobook BOX ed	33

==== Digital best albums ====
Year	Album details	Peak Hot 100 chart positions
2021	HARUNA LUNA BEST 2012-2020: Released: July 21, 2021; Label: Sacra Music; Format: streaming, download	—
"—" denotes releases that did not chart.

=== Mini albums ===
Year	Album details	Peak Oricon chart positions
2015	Dreamer: Released: November 11, 2015; Label: SME Records (SECL-1806~7, SECL-1808~9, SECL-1810); Format: CD, CD+DVD, CD+BD	28
2017	SxW EP: Released: February 22, 2017; Label: SME Records (SECL-2113~4, SECL-2115); Format: CD, CD+DVD	46
2019	Glory Days: Released: October 23, 2019; Label: Sacra Music (VVCL-1278~9, VVCL-1280, VVCL-1281~2); Format: CD, CD+DVD	15

=== Singles ===
Year	Song	Peak Oricon chart positions	Album
2012	"Sora wa Takaku Kaze wa Utau"	13	Oversky
2012	"Overfly"	7	Oversky
2013	"Kimi ga Kureta Sekai"	56	Oversky
2013	"Ai wo Utae"	13	Oversky
2013	"Snowdrop"	14	Candy Lips
2014	"Startear"	13	Candy Lips
2015	"Kimi-iro Signal"	21	Candy Lips
2016	"Ripple Effect"	27	Lunarium
2016	"Windia"	24	Lunarium
2017	"Stella Breeze"	22	Lunarium
2017	"KIRAMEKI☆Lifeline"	44	Haruna Luna Best 2012-2020
2018	"Momoiro Typhoon"	34	Haruna Luna Best 2012-2020
2020	"Peace!!!"	37	Haruna Luna Best 2012-2020
"—" denotes releases that did not chart.

==== Digital singles ====
Year	Title	Album
2014	"Lunatic World"	Candy Lips
2018	"JUSTICE"	Luna Joule
2019	"Lupa and Aries"	Haruna Luna Best 2012-2020
2019	"Kaiten Mokuba"	Haruna Luna Best 2012-2020
2020	"glory days - movie ver. -"	Non-album singles
2022	"BLUE ROSE"	Non-album singles
2024	"Comet in the Mirror"	Non-album singles
2024	"Eternal Corridor"	Non-album singles
2025	"Celebrate Life"	Non-album singles
2025	"Raison d'etre"	Non-album singles
