= Million Arthur (TV series) =

Japanese anime television series

- Key visual

叛逆性ミリオンアーサー (Hangyaku-sei Mirion Āsā)
- Genre: Fantasy
- Created by: Square Enix
- Anime television series
- Directed by: Yōhei Suzuki
- Written by: Gō Tamai
- Music by: Go Shiina
- Studio: J.C.Staff
- Licensed by: Crunchyroll (Note: In North America through Crunchyroll, LLC (formerly Funimation).); SEA: Medialink
- Original network: Tokyo MX, BS11, AT-X, SUN, TVA
- Original run: October 25, 2018 – June 27, 2019
- Episodes: 23 + 1 OVA

Million Arthur (叛逆性ミリオンアーサー, Hangyaku-sei Mirion Āsā; lit. "Operation Rebellion Million Arthur") is a Japanese anime television series produced by J.C.Staff. It is based on the media franchise of the same name created by Square Enix which consisted primarily of a series of video games.

== Plot ==
The sacred sword Excalibur was created to judge a person's ability to be king of England. Those whom the sword accepts will be called "Arthur" and will obtain great power. However, there was not a single Arthur, but many. Due to this massive creation of legendary humans, the world and its history began to be distorted. Now, with the aim of restoring the history of the world to its original course, six Arthurs, a master of the sword, a fighter, a sniper, a puncher, an alchemist and a shooter, will go to England. Their mission is to defeat all those who have managed to obtain a power from the sacred sword Excalibur and who are distorting the world.

== Characters ==
Dancho Arthur (団長アーサー, Danchō Āsā)
Voiced by: Sora Amamiya (Japanese); Alexis Tipton (English)
Dancho is the cheerful, eccentric and cosplay-lover blonde female leader that wields a sword.
Tekken Arthur (鉄拳アーサー, Tekken Āsā)
Voiced by: Tetsuya Kakihara (Japanese); Ricco Fajardo (English)
Tekken is high-spirit and exercises for any battle using his gauntlets.
Yamaneko Arthur (山猫アーサー, Yamaneko Āsā)
Voiced by: Ayana Taketatsu (Japanese); Alex Moore (English)
Yamaneko is an unsociable girl and holds a rocket launcher.
Renkin Arthur (錬金アーサー, Renkin Āsā)
Voiced by: Inori Minase (Japanese); Tia Ballard (English)
Renkin is a short girl who actually is an alchemist in training and carries a huge mallet.
Kakka Arthur (閣下アーサー, Kakka Āsā)
Voiced by: Natsuki Hanae (Japanese); Dallas Reid (English)
Kakka is rather a cute boy but a magician with a spellbook.
Ruro Arthur (流浪アーサー, Rurō Āsā)
Voiced by: Yuichi Nakamura (Japanese); Ian Sinclair (English)
Ruro appears to be a thoughtful young man with twin firearms.
Nuckelavee (ナックラヴイ)
Voiced by: Himika Akaneya (Japanese); Bryn Apprill (English)
Dancho's fairy.
Titania (ティター二ア)
Voiced by: Rie Takahashi (Japanese); Jill Harris (English)
Tekken's fairy.
Coupy (クーピー)
Voiced by: Nao Tōyama (Japanese); Sarah Wiedenheft (English)
Yamaneko's fairy.
Brigitte (ブリギッテ)
Voiced by: Yu Serizawa (Japanese); Skyler McIntosh (English)
Kakka's fairy.
Bodach (ボダッハ)
Voiced by: Suzuko Mimori (Japanese); Monica Rial (English)
Renkin's fairy.
Bethor (ベトール)
Voiced by: Rina Hidaka (Japanese); Felecia Angelle (English)
Ruro's fairy.

== Production ==
An anime television series adaptation of the Han-Gyaku-Sei Million Arthur MMORPG by J.C.Staff aired from October 25 to December 27, 2018, on Tokyo MX and other channels. It was announced that the series will be split-cour, with the second season airing from April 4 to June 27, 2019. The series is directed by Yōhei Suzuki and written by Gō Tamai. Yoshinari Saito provides the character designs. The series' music is composed by Go Shiina and produced by Lantis. Genco is producing the series. The opening theme song is "Highlight" by Ayaka Ōhashi, and the ending theme song is "KI-te MI-te HIT PARADE!" by Himika Akaneya, Rie Takahashi, Nao Tōyama, Yū Serizawa, Suzuko Mimori, and Rina Hidaka under their character names. The second opening theme song is "Open the Worlds" by ORESAMA, and the second ending theme song is "Pearly×Party" by the voice actress unit Pearly Fairy. The anime is licensed in North America by Funimation (now known as Crunchyroll).

The series ran for 23 episodes. An unaired episode was included in the series' sixth Blu-ray volume, which was released on October 2, 2019.

=== Episode list ===
==== Season 1 ====
No. overall	No. in season	Title	Original release date
1	1	"Rebellion to the Past" "Kako e no hangyaku" (過去への叛逆)	October 25, 2018
2	2	"The Forbidden Sacred Sword" "Kindan no Seiken" (禁断の聖剣)	November 1, 2018
3	3	"Iron Fist of Wrath" "Ikari no Tekken" (怒りの鉄拳)	November 8, 2018
4	4	"From the Sanctuary with Love" "Seichi yori ai o komete" (聖地より愛をこめて)	November 15, 2018
5	5	"Rotten Art" "Kusatta geijutsu" (腐った芸術)	November 22, 2018
6	6	"Star Fishing Arthur" "Hoshi o tsutta Āsā" (星を釣ったアーサー)	November 29, 2018
7	7	"Rose Buds" "Bara no tsubomi" (薔薇の蕾)	December 6, 2018
8	8	"Call Them Magical Girls" "Mahō shōjo to yobarete" (魔法少女と呼ばれて)	December 13, 2018
9	9	"Amongst the Most Beautiful Light" "Ito utsukushiki hikari no naka de" (いとうつくしき光の中で)	December 20, 2018
10	10	"Despair for the Future" "Mirai e no zetsubō" (未来への絶望)	December 27, 2018

==== Season 2 ====
No. overall	No. in season	Title	Original release date
11	1	"The Legend Fairy" "Denshō no Yōsei" (伝承の妖精)	April 4, 2019
12	2	"Failure as a Leader" "Danchō shikkaku" (団長失格)	April 11, 2019
13	3	"Goodbye, Yama" "Sayonara, Yama-chan" (さよなら、山ちゃん)	April 18, 2019
14	4	"Shivering Secret Hot Springs" "Senritsu no Hitō !" (戦慄の秘湯!)	April 25, 2019
15	5	"I Love Tasty Stuff" "Oishī no ga osuki" (おいしいのがお好き)	May 2, 2019
16	6	"Utahime Is Here! Rah! Rah! Rah!" "Utahime ga yattekuru Yā ! Yā ! Yā !" (歌姫がやって来るヤァ!ヤァ!ヤァ!)	May 9, 2019
17	7	"Captain Dancho" "Kyaputen Danchō" (キャプテン団長)	May 16, 2019
18	8	"Altered History" "Rekishi no Kaizan" (歴史の改竄)	May 23, 2019
19	9	"Stolen Excalibur" "Ubawareta Ekusukaribā" (奪われたエクスカリバー)	May 30, 2019
20	10	"Watch out, Little Red Riding Hood" "Akazukin-chan Ki o tsukete" (赤ずきんちゃん気をつけて)	June 6, 2019
21	11	"The Journey to Combine" "Gattai e no Michinori" (合体への道のり)	June 13, 2019
22	12	"Demise of Legend" "Denshō no Shūen" (伝承の終焉)	June 20, 2019
23	13	"Into the Rebel Future" "Hangyaku no Mirai e" (叛逆の未来へ)	June 27, 2019
OVA–24	14	"Farewell, Beloved Dancho" "Operation Han-Gyaku-Sei Million Arthur Special" (叛逆性ミリオンアーサー TV未放送エピソード)	October 2, 2019
