= Accel World: Infinite Burst =

- Key visual

Japanese name
- Kanji: アクセル・ワールド INFINITE∞BURST
Transcriptions
- Revised Hepburn: Akuseru Warudo Infinito Bāsuto
- Directed by: Masakazu Obara
- Screenplay by: Reki Kawahara; Hiroyuki Yoshino
- Based on: Accel World by Reki Kawahara
- Starring: Sachika Misawa; Yuki Kaji; Shintarō Asanuma; Aki Toyosaki; Aya Endō; Rina Hidaka
- Production company: Sunrise
- Distributed by: Warner Bros. Pictures
- Release date: July 23, 2016
- Running time: 82 minutes
- Country: Japan
- Language: Japanese
- Box office: ¥115 million

Accel World: Infinite Burst (Japanese: アクセル・ワールド INFINITE∞BURST, Hepburn: Akuseru Warudo Infinito Bāsuto) is a 2016 Japanese animated science fantasy action film based on the Accel World light novel series written by Reki Kawahara and illustrated by HIMA. It was produced by Sunrise, directed by Masakazu Obara and co-written by Kawahara, featuring character designs by Yukiko Aikei. It premiered in Japan on July 23, 2016. The events of the film take place after the final episode of the series.

== Plot ==
The story starts off with a 40-minute recap of the anime television series, with Kuroyukihime narrating the recap. Then, it starts off showing a new character in what appears to be a gym. She had an accident that caused her to be hospitalized. The scene shifted off to a territory battle between Nega Nebulus and Great Wall, where Sky Raker and Ardor Maiden are fighting against two Burst Linkers. Meanwhile, Scarlet Rain and Blood Leopard are also battling off against multiple Linkers. The Scene shifted again to a battle between Silver Crow and Ash Roller. Black Lotus and Green Grandee appeared as each Legion's leaders. But before they could even battle, a huge storm appeared and destroyed the Battle Field and immediately disconnects all the Linkers from the Accelerated World. Back in the Real World, Shinomiya informs that the Brain Burst Application doesn't work as the Icon is greyed out, rendering every linker unable to Burst Link.

== Characters ==
=== Voice cast ===
Character	Japanese	English
Kuroyukihime	Sachika Misawa	Kira Buckland
Haruyuki Arita	Yuki Kaji	Erik Scott Kimerer
Takumu Mayuzumi	Shintarō Asanuma	Lucien Dodge
Chiyuri Kurashima	Aki Toyosaki	Stephanie Sheh
Fuko Kurosaki	Aya Endō	Dorothy Elias-Fahn
Yuniko Kozuki	Rina Hidaka	Sarah Anne Williams
Blood Leopard	Ayako Kawasumi	Erika Harlacher
Ash Roller	Kenichi Suzumura	Ben Diskin
Utai Shinomiya	Yumi Hara	Xanthe Huynh
Green Grandee	Takaya Kuroda	Jay Allen White
Yellow Radio	Akira Ishida	Vic Mignogna
Viridian Decurion	Kenji Yanagisawa	Vic Mignogna
Iron Pound	Naoya Nosaka	Austin Lee Matthews
Lignum Vitae	Asuka Ōgame	Jessica Straus
Purple Thorn	Kaori Mizuhashi	Jessica Straus
Sundan Schaefer	Miyuki Kobori	Faye Mata
Lemon Pierrette	Asuka Ōgame	Faye Mata
Risa Tsukiori	Chinatsu Akasaki	Kayli Mills
Nyx	Aoi Yūki	Cassandra Lee Morris
Metatron	Yukana	Laura Post

== Production ==
Dengeki Bunko at their Autumn Festival 2015 event on October 4, 2015, announced that the light novel series will receive a new anime adaptation featuring an original story by Kawahara, titled Accel World: Infinite Burst, with the staff and cast returning from the anime television to reprise their roles in the film. In February 2016, the Dengeki Bunko Magazine announced in their 48th volume that the film is scheduled for release in Japanese theaters on July 23, 2016. The film's theme song, titled "Plasmic Fire", was performed by KOTOKO × ALTIMA.

== Media ==
=== Novel ===
A novel titled Accel World: Jump to Infinity (アクセル・ワールド－無限への跳躍－, Accel World -Mugen e no Chōyaku), also written by Kawahara, was given to those who watch the film within the first week of its premiere in Japanese theaters.

== Reception ==
The film was ninth placed at the Japanese box office on its opening weekend.

=== Critical response ===
Writing for Biggest In Japan, Richard Eisenbeis praised the film as a "lot of mindless fun" for franchise loyalists who are up to date on the light novels, though he noted that its spoiler-heavy, unexplained narrative shifts and heavy reliance on fan service left him feeling "often lost" as a fan of the television anime series alone.

Andrew Girdwood, for Geek Native, gave it a mixed-to-positive review, describing it as a "switch your brain off and watch the pretty pictures for 90-minutes anime" that succeeded in thoroughly summarizing the franchise for newcomers through its "super-speed retelling" and delivering an easy-to-understand narrative, though he criticized it for failing to add to the mythos in any meaningful way and offering little new content.
