= Magician's Quest: Mysterious Times =

2008 video game

- Developer: Aquria
- Publisher: Konami
- Platform: Nintendo DS
- Release: JP: 2008
- Genres: Life simulation, social simulation, RPG, adventure
- Modes: Single-player, multiplayer

Magician's Quest: Mysterious Times, known in Europe as Enchanted Folk and the School of Wizardry and in Japan as Tongari Boushi to Mahou no 365 Nichi (とんがりボウシと魔法の365にち; lit. "Pointy Hats and 365 Days of Magic"), is a fantasy-adventure and life simulation game for the Nintendo DS where players are tasked with attending classes in a Magic Academy, to learn the mysteries of magic and the art of casting spells, while building relationships with other students.

Three sequels, two for Nintendo DS and one for Nintendo 3DS, Tongari Boushi to Mahou no Omise (lit. "Pointy Hats and the Shop of Magic", 2010), Tongari Boushi to Oshare na Mahoutsukai (lit. "Pointy Hats and the Stylish Wizard", 2011), and Tongari Boushi to Mahou no Machi (lit. "Pointy Hats and the Town of Magic", 2012) have thus far only been released in Japan.

== Gameplay ==
At the start of the game the player can create their own character, by selecting the gender, name and appearance. The game involves learning new magic spells from the other characters in the school. These spells are put to use in a series of 52 adventures.

There is also an option of customizing the player character and decorating their own room. Magician's Quest also features Wi-Fi cooperative play, and the player is able to use a "magical alphabet" to chat. Since the game uses the DS internal clock, at certain times random events may occur. The game is strikingly similar to Animal Crossing: Wild World, developed by Nintendo for the same platform.

There are plenty of things to accomplish in Magician's Quest. Depending on the gender of the character, the player can have multiple girlfriends/boyfriends throughout the course of the game (more than one at a time); host an exchange student by way of Wi-Fi; have their friends move into their dorm temporarily; form a band (each villager plays a different musical instrument ranging from the violin to the electric guitar); and play with their favourite villagers one-on-one. There is a great variety of villagers (the player can even have a blue cell phone in their town, and multiple undead creatures and plants like roses and hibiscus).

Using a mysterious key, the player is able to activate "Mystery Time", an event functioning as a unique time of day when the Nutcracker score plays and the world displays in unusual colors; the player can take exclusive extracurricular lessons and catch exclusive bugs and fish at this time, many of them mythical, prehistoric, or cryptozoological in nature. The following day, a strange character will appear with a quest. These quests are not difficult, and a reward is earned after each one completed. The Mystery Time villager could range from Satyr, a hippie who wants to have a "jam session" with the player, to Death, whom they must find if they can't give him candy. There are also dragons, fairies and plenty in between.

While Mystery Time is typically activated by the player, there are also scheduled Mystery Times at certain times of the year which will summon seasonal creatures and quests. These can include creatures like Krampus, Jack-o-Lantern, and Jack Frost.

== Reception ==
Reception

Aggregate score
Aggregator	Score
Metacritic	69/100

Review scores
Publication	Score
Eurogamer	6/10
Famitsu	28/40
IGN	7.5/10
NGamer	63%
Nintendo Power	7.5/10
VideoGamer.com	8/10

The game received "average" reviews according to the review aggregation website Metacritic. In Japan, Famitsu gave it all four sevens for a total of 28 out of 40.
