= Sword Art Online: Integral Factor =

2017 video game

- Developer: Asobimo
- Publisher: Bandai Namco Entertainment
- Platforms: Android, iOS, Windows
- Release: Android, iOS; December 2, 2017; Windows; Google Play Games November 14, 2022 Steam August 21, 2023
- Genre: MMORPG

Sword Art Online: Integral Factor is a Japanese massively multiplayer online open-world role-playing game developed by Asobimo and published by Bandai Namco Entertainment, released in December 2017, and based on the light novel and anime series Sword Art Online.

== Synopsis ==
Similar to the anime series, users play as the protagonist of the story in the same environment as the anime's characters, who also take part in the user's journey. The user must aim to clear all 100 floors of the Aincrad and level up their avatar to increase their strength and abilities. Users can party up with other players from all over the world to do boss raids and successfully beat bosses to reach the next floor of the Aincrad.

=== Plot ===
In the year 2022, the first full-dive VRMMO game known as Sword Art Online was released to the world, and only 10,000 players were able to get a copy for themselves. On the day of the game's release, all 10,000 users end up trapped in the game. The player character, a beta tester, gets trapped in the game as well, where they meet another beta tester named Koharu, whom they played with during the test and promised to meet in the full game. Unaware of their situation, the player helps her practice her skills in battle, before realising that the log out button is missing from the game menu.

The player and Koharu are forced to grab as many resources as possible for survival and battle their way to the 100th floor to clear the game, during which all players will be released from the game. However, dying in the game also means dying in real life. During the journey, the player meets several people who accompany them on their journey through the death game.

A short manga reveals that the player eventually finds out Koharu is extremely scared of dying, so they volunteer to train her and the two boost their stats together. Before long, the protagonist meets a player named Sachi. Koharu makes a promise to Sachi, saying that she will survive a boss raid that the group is about to take part in.

During the boss raid, the player battles alongside the party's leader, Diavel, as well as Kirito and Asuna, the main protagonists of the original anime series. Diavel attempts to take the last attack, but is unsuccessful, causing the player to shield him from the boss's deathly blows. He survives and Kirito gets the last attack bonus instead, causing other members of the raid party to accuse him of being a beater, or a beta tester and cheater rolled into one.

The rest of the story is continued in the video game, which currently covers floors 1–99. However, the events of many floors are not covered in the game, so the total number of playable floors is around 30.

== Gameplay ==
Players fight using several different types of weapons, ranging from sword, rapier, dagger, mace, bow, axe, spear. Users also have access to special powerful attacks known as Sword Skills which can be activated after their cooldown period ends. Users can equip up to four sword skills and perform this with other players in quick succession, which is known as a Switch. Users are able to equip extra statistic for them by using ability or widely known as passive skills. Skills are classified their rarity based on their number of stars, and can be obtained by buying Orders from the shop or as rewards from quests or special events. Players can also equip potions in their potion slots to heal up while in battle. Users have can equip up to 4 different potions at once.

Users exchange in-game currency known as Col for shop items. However, they can also spend Arcana Gems in the Arcana Gem Shop for special, featured or limited items and skills. Arcana Gems have more value and are harder to obtain, and are usually given out as rewards from earning achievements. Besides killing monsters or clearing floors, users can also earn Col by exchanging event items for it, but the game allows users to do this in limited amounts only, the maximum col you can have is 99,999,999 cols.
