= Aquria =

Japanese video game developer

AQURIA Co., Ltd.
- Native name: 株式会社アクリア
- Romanized name: Kabushiki gaisha Akuria
- Type: Kabushiki gaisha
- Industry: Video games
- Founded: January 8, 2002; 24 years ago
- Headquarters: Yokohama, Kanagawa Prefecture, Japan
- Products: Console games
- Number of employees: 48 (2018)
- Website: www.aquria.co.jp

AQURIA Co., Ltd. is a Japanese game developer based in Yokohama, Japan. The company is mainly engaged in software development of console games.

The company is known for developing Sword Art Online: Infinity Moment, Sword Art Online: Hollow Fragment and the sequel Sword Art Online: Hollow Realization based on the popular Japanese light novel series, Sword Art Online. They are also known for their development assistance in the mainline and portable titles of the Boku no Natsuyasumi series by Millennium Kitchen.

== Games developed by Aquria ==
=== Nintendo DS ===
Title	Original release date	Publisher(s)	JP	NA	EU	AUS
Kimi ni Todoke ~Tsutaeru Kimochi~	JP: October 15, 2009	JP: Bandai Namco Entertainment	Yes	No	No	No
Kimi ni Todoke ~Sodateru Omoi~	JP: April 7, 2011	JP: Bandai Namco Entertainment	Yes	No	No	No
Tongari Boushi to Mahou no Omise(co-developed with Konami)	JP: November 11, 2010	JP: Konami	Yes	No	No	No
Magician's Quest: Mysterious Times (Tongari Boushi to Mahou no 365 Nichi)(co-developed with Konami, Vanpool)	JP: November 13, 2008; EU: March 13, 2009; NA: May 11, 2009	WW: Konami	Yes	Yes	Yes	No
Tokimeki Memorial Girl's Side: 1st Love (co-developed with Konami)	JP: March 15, 2007	JP: Konami	Yes	No	No	No

=== Nintendo 3DS ===
Title	Original release date	Publisher(s)	JP	NA	EU	AUS
Kuroko no Basuke: Shouri e no Kiseki	JP: February 20, 2014	JP: Bandai Namco Entertainment	Yes	No	No	No
Kuroko no Basuke: Mirai e no Kizuna	JP: March 26, 2015	JP: Bandai Namco Entertainment	Yes	No	No	No
Guild02: Attack of the Friday Monsters! (co-developed with Millennium Kitchen)	JP: March 13, 2013; WW: May 16, 2013	WW: Level-5	Yes	Yes	Yes	Yes

=== Nintendo Switch ===
Title	Original release date	Publisher(s)	JP	NA	EU	AUS
Sword Art Online: Hollow Realization	JP: April 25, 2019; WW: May 24, 2019	WW: Bandai Namco Entertainment	Yes	Yes	Yes	No

=== PlayStation 2 ===
Title	Original release date	Publisher(s)	JP	NA	EU	AUS
Mahou Sensei Negima! 1-Jikanme ~Okochama Sensei wa Mahou Tsukai!	JP: January 20, 2005	JP: Konami	Yes	No	No	No
Mahou Sensei Negima! 2-Jikanme ~Tatakau Otome-tachi! Mahora Daiundokai SP!	JP: July 28, 2005	JP: Konami	Yes	No	No	No
Suzumiya Haruhi no Tomadoi(co-developed with Banpresto)	JP: January 31, 2008	JP: Banpresto	Yes	No	No	No

=== PlayStation 3 ===
Title	Original release date	Publisher(s)	JP	NA	EU	AUS
Boku no Natsuyasumi 3: Kitaguni Hen: Chiisana Boku no Dai Sougen(co-developed with Millennium Kitchen)	JP: July 5, 2007	JP: Sony Computer Entertainment	Yes	No	No	No

=== PlayStation 4 ===
Title	Original release date	Publisher(s)	JP	NA	EU	AUS
Sword Art Online Re: Hollow Fragment	NA: July 28, 2015; EU: August 4, 2015; JP: November 19, 2015	WW: Bandai Namco Entertainment	Yes	Yes	Yes	Yes
Sword Art Online: Hollow Realization	JP: October 27, 2016; WW: November 8, 2016	WW: Bandai Namco Entertainment	Yes	Yes	Yes	Yes
The Caligula Effect: Overdose	JP: May 17, 2018	JP: FuRyu	Yes	No	No	No
Record of Grancrest War	JP: June 14, 2018	JP: Bandai Namco Entertainment	Yes	No	No	No
Sword Art Online: Alicization Lycoris	WW: July 10, 2020	WW: Bandai Namco Entertainment	Yes	Yes	Yes	Yes

=== PlayStation Portable ===
Title	Original release date	Publisher(s)	JP	NA	EU	AUS
Gallery Fake	JP: September 29, 2005	JP: Bandai	Yes	No	No	No
Boku no Natsuyasumi Portable: Mushi Mushi Hakase to Teppen-yama no Himitsu!! (co-developed with Millennium Kitchen)	JP: June 29, 2006	JP: Sony Computer Entertainment	Yes	No	No	No
Metal Gear Solid: Digital Graphic Novel(Metal Gear Solid: Bande Dessinée)(co-developed with Kojima Productions)	JP: September 21, 2006; NA: June 13, 2006; EU: September 21, 2006	WW: Konami	Yes	Yes	Yes	Yes
Boku no Natsuyasumi 4: Seitouchi Shounen Tanteidan, Boku to Himitsu no Chizu (co-developed with Millennium Kitchen)	JP: July 2, 2009	JP: Sony Computer Entertainment	Yes	No	No	No
Boku no Natsuyasumi Portable 2: Nazo Nazo Shimai to Chinbotsusen no Himitsu (co-developed with Millennium Kitchen)	JP: June 24, 2010	JP: Sony Computer Entertainment	Yes	No	No	No
Tokimeki Memorial Girl's Side Premium ~3rd Story~(co-developed with Konami)	JP: March 15, 2012	JP: Konami	Yes	No	No	No
Kuroko no Basuke: Kiseke no Shiai	JP: August 9, 2012	JP: Bandai Namco Entertainment	Yes	No	No	No
Sword Art Online: Infinity Moment	JP: March 14, 2013	JP: Bandai Namco Entertainment	Yes	No	No	No

=== PlayStation Vita ===
Title	Original release date	Publisher(s)	JP	NA	EU	AUS
Sword Art Online: Hollow Fragment	JP: April 24, 2014; NA: August 19, 2014; EU: August 20, 2014	WW: Bandai Namco Entertainment	Yes	Yes	Yes	Yes
Sword Art Online: Hollow Realization	JP: October 27, 2016; WW: November 8, 2016	WW: Bandai Namco Entertainment	Yes	Yes	Yes	Yes
The Caligula Effect	JP: June 23, 2016; NA: May 2, 2017; EU: May 9, 2017	JP: FuRyu; WW: Atlus USA	Yes	Yes	Yes	Yes

=== Windows ===
Title	Original release date	Publisher(s)	JP	NA	EU	AUS
Sword Art Online: Alicization Lycoris	WW: July 10, 2020	WW: Bandai Namco Entertainment	Yes	Yes	Yes	Yes

=== Xbox One ===
Title	Original release date	Publisher(s)	JP	NA	EU	AUS
Sword Art Online: Alicization Lycoris	WW: July 10, 2020	WW: Bandai Namco Entertainment	Yes	Yes	Yes	Yes
