= Accel World =

Japanese light novel series

- First light novel volume cover, featuring Kuroyukihime

アクセル・ワールド (Akuseru Wārudo)
- Genre: Adventure; Science fantasy
- Novel series
- Written by: Reki Kawahara (as Semedain)
- Published by: Self-published
- Original run: October 2007 – December 2007
- Light novel
- Written by: Reki Kawahara
- Illustrated by: HIMA
- Published by: ASCII Media Works
- English publisher: NA: Yen Press
- Imprint: Dengeki Bunko
- Magazine: Dengeki Bunko Magazine
- Original run: February 10, 2009 – present
- Volumes: 28
- Manga
- Written by: Reki Kawahara
- Illustrated by: Hiroyuki Aigamo
- Published by: ASCII Media Works
- English publisher: NA: Yen Press
- Magazine: Dengeki Bunko Magazine
- Original run: April 10, 2010 – June 9, 2017
- Volumes: 8
- Manga

Acchel World
- Written by: Reki Kawahara
- Illustrated by: Ryuryū Akari
- Published by: ASCII Media Works
- Magazine: Dengeki Bunko Magazine
- Original run: April 10, 2010 – June 10, 2016
- Volumes: 5
- Manga

Accel World / Dural: Magisa Garden
- Written by: Ayato Sasakura
- Published by: ASCII Media Works
- Magazine: Monthly Comic Dengeki Daioh
- Original run: January 27, 2012 – June 27, 2017
- Volumes: 8
- Anime television series
- Directed by: Masakazu Obara
- Written by: Hiroyuki Yoshino
- Music by: Hiroyuki Oshima; MintJam; Onoken
- Studio: Sunrise
- Licensed by: AUS: Hanabee; NA: Viz Media; SEA: Muse Communication; UK: MVM Films
- Original network: Tokyo MX, TV Saitama, Chiba TV, tvk, TV Aichi, MBS, AT-X, HBC, RKB, BS11
- English network: NA: Neon Alley; SEA: Animax Asia
- Original run: April 7, 2012 – September 22, 2012
- Episodes: 24 (+ 2 OVA episodes)
- Film
- Accel World: Infinite Burst
- Video games
- Accel World: Ginyoku no Kakusei (2012); Accel World: Kasoku no Chōten (2013)
- icon

Accel World (Japanese: アクセル・ワールド, Hepburn: Akuseru Wārudo) is a Japanese light novel series written by Reki Kawahara and illustrated by HIMA. Kawahara originally released the first volume's story as a web novel, under the title Transcendent Accelerated Burst Linker (超絶加速バースト・リンカー, Chōzetsu Kasoku Bāsuto Rinkā), on the novel submission site Arcadia in 2007. It has been published by ASCII Media Works under its Dengeki Bunko imprint since February 2009. The series has spawned three manga series; Accel World by Hiroyuki Aigamo, published in Dengeki Bunko Magazine from April 2010 to June 2017; Acchel World by Ryuryū Akari, published in the same magazine from April 2010 to June 2016; and Accel World / Dural: Magisa Garden by Ayato Sasakura, published in Monthly Comic Dengeki Daioh from January 2012 to June 2017. The light novel series and its manga adaptation of the same name have been licensed for English release in North America by Yen Press.

A 24-episode anime adaptation produced by Sunrise aired between April and September 2012. It was licensed by Viz Media and began streaming in English on its Neon Alley service in April 2013. Two video games were released for the PlayStation Portable and PlayStation 3 in September 2012 and January 2013, each containing an original video animation (OVA) episode. An anime film titled Accel World: Infinite Burst featuring an original story by Kawahara premiered in Japan in July 2016.

== Plot ==
Haruyuki "Haru" Arita is a short, overweight boy who is frequently ridiculed by delinquents at the Umesato Junior High School. Using his Neuro Linker to escape the torment of real life, he logs onto the school's local network cyberspace where he always plays virtual squash alone, and his innate video game skills bring him to the attention of Kuroyukihime (literally meaning "Black Snow Princess"), the school's popular, highly intellectual and attractive female student council vice-president.

After helping him against the delinquents, Kuroyukihime introduces Haruyuki to Brain Burst, a secret program that is able to accelerate the human cognitive process to the point at which time appears to stop. Haruyuki soon learns that Brain Burst is more than just a program, but an augmented-reality massively-multiplayer online (ARMMO) fighting game where people fight each other in fierce duels in order to obtain burst points, which can be spent for acceleration abilities in the real world.

Kuroyukihime then enlists Haruyuki's help in reaching level 10 within Brain Burst by defeating the "Six Kings of Pure Colour" and ultimately meeting the creator of Brain Burst to learn its true purpose. With every challenge they face in the accelerated world, Haru and Kuroyukihime, under their aliases "Silver Crow" and "Black Lotus", gather trusted allies and confront treacherous enemies. Their bond grows stronger while working to attain their ultimate objective: to reach the highest in-game level and meet the game's creator, who will reveal why the game was created and the true purpose of it.

== Media ==
=== Light novels ===
Accel World began as a light novel series written by Reki Kawahara and illustrated by HIMA. Originally, Kawahara entered the first novel in the series into ASCII Media Works' 15th Dengeki Novel Prize in 2008 and the novel won the Grand Prize. The first novel was published by ASCII Media Works on February 10, 2009, under their Dengeki Bunko imprint. As of August 2025, 28 volumes have been published. At their Japan Expo USA panel, Yen Press announced the rights to publish the light novels in English. The English version is translated by Jocelyne Allen. The first volume was released on July 22, 2014.

No.	Title	Original release date	English release date
1	Kuroyukihime's Return; Kuroyukihime no Kikan (黒雪姫の帰還)	February 10, 2009; 978-4-04-867517-8	July 22, 2014; 978-0-316-37673-0
2	The Red Storm Princess; Kurenai no Bōfūki (紅の暴風姫)	June 10, 2009; 978-4-04-867843-8	November 18, 2014; 978-0-316-29636-6
3	The Twilight Marauder; Yūyami no Ryakudatsusha (夕闇の略奪者)	October 10, 2009; 978-4-04-868070-7	March 24, 2015; 978-0-316-29637-3
4	Flight Toward a Blue Sky; Aozora e no Hishō (蒼空への飛翔)	February 10, 2010; 978-4-04-868327-2	July 21, 2015; 978-0-316-29638-0
5	The Floating Starlight Bridge; Hoshikage no Ukihashi (星影の浮き橋)	June 10, 2010; 978-4-04-868593-1	November 17, 2015; 978-0-316-29639-7
6	Shrine Maiden of the Sacred Fire; Jōka no Miko (浄火の神子)	October 10, 2010; 978-4-04-868969-4	March 22, 2016; 978-0-316-29640-3
7	Armor of Catastrophe; Saika no Yoroi (災禍の鎧)	February 10, 2011; 978-4-04-870276-8	September 20, 2016; 978-0-316-35819-4
8	The Binary Stars of Destiny; Unmei no Rensei (運命の連星)	June 10, 2011; 978-4-04-870550-9	December 13, 2016; 978-0-316-31761-0
9	The Seven-Thousand-Year Prayer; Nanasennen no Inori (七千年の祈り)	October 10, 2011; 978-4-04-870954-5	March 21, 2017; 978-0-316-50270-2
10	Elements; Elements	December 10, 2011; 978-4-04-886241-7	June 20, 2017; 978-0-316-46605-9
11	The Carbide Wolf; Chōkō no Ōkami (超硬の狼)	April 10, 2012; 978-4-04-886521-0	September 19, 2017; 978-0-316-46606-6
12	The Red Crest; Aka no Monshō (赤の紋章)	August 10, 2012; 978-4-04-886795-5	December 12, 2017; 978-0-316-46607-3
13	Signal Fire at the Water's Edge; Mizugiwa no Gōka (水際の号火)	February 10, 2013; 978-4-04-891330-0	April 10, 2018; 978-1-9753-0006-7
14	Archangel of Savage Light; Gekkō no Daitenshi (激光の大天使)	June 7, 2013; 978-4-04-891608-0	June 26, 2018; 978-1-9753-2723-1
15	The End and the Beginning; Owari to Hajimari (終わりと始まり)	October 10, 2013; 978-4-04-866005-1	September 18, 2018; 978-1-9753-2725-5
16	Snow White's Slumber; Shirayukihime no Madoromi (白雪姫の微睡)	February 8, 2014; 978-4-04-866320-5	December 18, 2018; 978-1-9753-2727-9
17	Cradle of Stars; Hoshi no Yurikago (星の揺りかご)	October 10, 2014; 978-4-04-866936-8	March 19, 2019; 978-1-9753-2729-3
18	The Black Dual Swordsman; Kuro no Sōkenshi (黒の双剣士)	June 10, 2015; 978-4-04-865189-9	June 18, 2019; 978-1-9753-2731-6
19	Pull of the Dark Nebula; Ankoku Seiun no Inryoku (暗黒星雲の引力)	October 10, 2015; 978-4-04-865438-8	September 9, 2019; 978-1-9753-3218-1
20	The Rivalry of White and Black; Shiro to Kuro no Sōkoku (白と黒の相剋)	June 10, 2016; 978-4-04-892115-2	December 17, 2019; 978-1-9753-3271-6
21	The Snow Sprite; Yuki no Yōsei (雪の妖精)	December 10, 2016; 978-4-04-892390-3	April 21, 2020; 978-1-9753-3273-0
22	Sun God of Absolute Flame; Zetsuen no Taiyōshin (絶焔の太陽神)	November 10, 2017; 978-4-04-893465-7	September 22, 2020; 978-1-9753-3277-8
23	Kuroyukihime's Confession; Kuroyukihime no Kokuhaku (黒雪姫の告白)	September 7, 2018; 978-4-04-893917-1	December 15, 2020; 978-1-9753-3275-4
24	Sword Sage of the Blue Flower; Seika no Kensen (青華の剣仙)	August 10, 2019; 978-4-04-912676-1	April 27, 2021; 978-1-9753-2133-8
25	Deity of Demise; Shūen no Kyoshin (終焉の巨神)	September 10, 2020; 978-4-04-913440-7	November 9, 2021; 978-1-9753-3508-3
26	Conqueror of the Sundered Heavens; Retten no Seifukusha (裂天の征服者)	March 10, 2022; 978-4-04-914133-7	August 22, 2023; 978-1-9753-6784-8
27	The Fourth Acceleration; Daishi no Kasoku (第四の加速)	March 8, 2024; 978-4-04-915389-7	May 13, 2025; 979-8-8554-1186-7
28	Goddess of the Night; Yoru no Megami (夜の女神)	August 8, 2025; 978-4-04-916467-1	December 8, 2026 (scheduled); 979-8-8554-3825-3

=== Manga ===
==== Accel World ====
A manga adaptation by Hiroyuki Aigamo was serialized in ASCII Media Works' Dengeki Bunko Magazine between April 10, 2010, and June 9, 2017. Its chapters were collected in eight tankōbon volumes, released between July 27, 2011, and July 27, 2017.

In North America, the manga has been licensed for English release by Yen Press. The English translation is by Jocelyne Allen. The volumes were released between September 23, 2014, and December 11, 2018.

No.	Original release date	Original ISBN	English release date	English ISBN
1	July 27, 2011	978-4-04-870630-8	September 23, 2014	978-0-316-33586-7
2	July 27, 2011	978-4-04-870634-6	December 16, 2014	978-0-316-29634-2
3	August 27, 2012	978-4-04-886421-3	March 24, 2015	978-0-316-29635-9
4	February 27, 2013	978-4-04-891398-0	July 21, 2015	978-0-316-30216-6
5	February 27, 2014	978-4-04-866389-2	October 27, 2015	978-0-316-30614-0
6	February 27, 2015	978-4-04-869286-1	January 26, 2016	978-0-316-26898-1
7	July 27, 2016	978-4-04-892107-7	March 21, 2017	978-0-316-46920-3
8	July 27, 2017	978-4-04-893296-7	December 11, 2018	978-1-9753-2913-6

==== Acchel World ====
A four-panel comic strip manga by Ryuryū Akari, titled Acchel World (あくちぇる・わーるど。, Akucheru Wārudo), was serialized in Dengeki Bunko Magazine between April 10, 2010, and June 10, 2016. Five tankōbon volumes were released between July 27, 2011, and October 26, 2013.

No.	Release date	ISBN
1	July 27, 2011	978-4-04-870619-3
2	August 27, 2012	978-4-04-886808-2
3	October 26, 2013	978-4-04-866082-2
4	March 27, 2015	978-4-04-869342-4
5	July 27, 2016	978-4-04-892108-4

==== Accel World / Dural: Magisa Garden ====
A spin-off manga written and illustrated by Ayato Sasakura, titled Accel World / Dural: Magisa Garden (アクセル・ワールド/デュラル マギサ・ガーデン, Akuseru Wārudo Duraru Magisa Gāden), was serialized in ASCII Media Works's Monthly Comic Dengeki Daioh from January 27, 2012, to June 27, 2017; its chapters were collected in eight volumes. It spotlights female burst linkers who attend a private school, Kiyomi Gakuin, in Nakano, Tokyo. Some of the characters from the main story also appear.

No.	Release date	ISBN
1	August 27, 2012	978-4-04-886934-8
2	April 27, 2013	978-4-04-891617-2
3	January 27, 2014	978-4-04-866238-3
4	September 27, 2014	978-4-04-866839-2
5	May 27, 2015	978-4-04-865110-3
6	January 27, 2016	978-4-04-865650-4
7	September 27, 2016	978-4-04-892295-1
8	August 26, 2017	978-4-04-893241-7

=== Anime ===
An anime television series adaptation aired between April 7 and September 22, 2012. The opening theme until episode 13 is "Chase the world" by May'n and the ending theme is "→unfinished→" by Kotoko. From episode 14 onwards the opening theme is "Burst the Gravity" by Altima and the ending theme is "unite." by Sachika Misawa. Warner Home Video, ASCII Media Works, Namco Bandai Games, Sunrise and Genco were involved in the production of this adaptation. Viz Media announced the streaming of the anime on Hulu on April 6, 2012. An English-dubbed version premiered on Viz Media's online streaming service, Neon Alley, on April 19, 2013. An anime film titled Accel World: Infinite Burst featuring an original story by Kawahara was released on July 23, 2016. Hanabee Entertainment has licensed the series alongside Little Busters!, and previously From the New World, Campione!, and The Familiar of Zero in May 2014. Muse Communication has licensed the series in Asia-Pacific and is streaming on Muse Asia's YouTube channel.

=== Video games ===
Two video games based on the series were developed by B.B. Studio and published by Namco Bandai Games for PlayStation 3 and PlayStation Portable. The first of these, Accel World: Awakening of the Silver Wings (アクセル・ワールド ─銀翼の覚醒─, Akuseru Wārudo -Gin'yoku no Kakusei-), was released in Japan on September 13, 2012. The second one, Accel World: The Peak of Acceleration (アクセル・ワールド ─加速の頂点─, Akuseru Wārudo -Kasoku no Chōten-), was released in Japan on January 31, 2013. The limited edition versions of these games include an original video animation (OVA) of the anime series (Blu-ray for the PS3 version, DVD for the PSP version). In Z.H.P. Unlosing Ranger VS Darkdeath Evilman for PSP, Silver Crow is an unlockable costume. In Sword Art Online: Lost Song, Black Lotus is an obtainable character and is also one of the opponents you can defeat.

An action role-playing game titled Accel World vs. Sword Art Online: Millennium Twilight was announced in October 2016. The game is a crossover with Sword Art Online, developed by Bandai Namco Entertainment for PlayStation 4 and PlayStation Vita and released on July 7, 2017. The Windows PC version was released on September 12, 2017.

== Reception ==
Rebecca Silverman of Anime News Network reviewed the series and gave a story rating of A−, stating a similar basis of Sword Art Online with improved characters. Richard Eisenbeis of Kotaku praised the anime for its well-thought out story, relatable main character, and great villain protagonist, but criticizes the anime for its third arc. At the end, he says that the anime starts out strong, but ends on a weak note.

Writing in the third edition of The Anime Encyclopedia (2015), Jonathan Clements and Helen McCarthy praised Accel World for its exploration of how virtual reality can provide an escape from social exclusion and allow individuals marginalized in everyday life to achieve recognition and success. They considered Reki Kawahara's understanding of this appeal central to the series, describing it as a "clever, if rather talky" examination of the integration of technology into everyday life. They also observed that the series initially attracted relatively little attention in the West compared with Kawahara's "flashier" Sword Art Online.

The anime entry in The Encyclopedia of Science Fiction calls it a "hit or miss", noting that the show's male lead and other character are poorly developed, while the "many strong female characters" are undermined by "creepy fan service". The entry states that while the show "does have many interesting ideas [...] they are left under-developed", and "the number of loose ends is frustrating", concluding that "there are certainly good parts, but the whole is disappointing".
