= Sword Art Online: Fatal Bullet =

2018 video game

- Developer: Dimps
- Publisher: Bandai Namco Entertainment
- Directors: Shuichi Goto; Ayano Komatsu
- Producers: Masahiro Kashino; Keishu Minami
- Designers: Tomoyuki Okitsu; Yukihiro Higashi; Takaaki Tanaka
- Programmer: Yasuo Mizuma
- Artists: Atsushi Maeda; Tomohiro Takada
- Writers: Emiko Kawasaki; Yuh Ochiai; Yousuke Ehara; Motohiro Miyazaki
- Composer: Kengo Tokusashi
- Series: Sword Art Online
- Engine: Unreal Engine 4
- Platforms: PlayStation 4; Windows; Xbox One; Nintendo Switch
- Release: PlayStation 4, Windows, Xbox One: JP: February 8, 2018; WW: February 23, 2018; Nintendo Switch: JP: August 8, 2019; WW: August 9, 2019
- Genre: Action role-playing
- Modes: Single-player, multiplayer

Sword Art Online: Fatal Bullet (ソードアート・オンライン フイタル・バレット, Sōdo Āto Onrain Feitaru Baretto) is a Japanese third-person shooter action role-playing video game developed by Dimps for the PlayStation 4, Xbox One, Nintendo Switch and Microsoft Windows based on the Sword Art Online light novel series. It is the fifth game in the series and is the successor to the 2016 game Sword Art Online: Hollow Realization. The PlayStation 4 version was released in Japan on February 8, 2018, with a worldwide release on PlayStation 4, Xbox One, and Microsoft Windows on February 23. The Nintendo Switch version was released as a Complete Edition, including all DLC, on August 8 in Japan and August 9 worldwide.

Taking place in the virtual reality MMORPG (VRMMORPG) Gun Gale Online, Fatal Bullet features an alternate timeline to the light novels and anime.

== Gameplay ==
Unlike past installments, Fatal Bullet features original character creation and the usage of firearms in battle, though other weapons like Kirito's photon sword are also available. As the player progresses through the story, they can also unlock the ability to dual-wield a gun and photon sword in a similar manner to Kirito. A third-person shooter and role-playing game hybrid, players can level up and gain skills as the game progresses. While fighting, players are provided with a wire that can allow them to quickly move around; although the wire is not in the canonical Gun Gale Online, a Bullet Line system – which serves as an assist in defending the user – is included in Fatal Bullet.

The game features multiplayer, which allows players to form four-man cooperative parties or fight against one another in four-on-four player versus player (PvP) matches. In PvP deathmatches, players are split into Alpha and Bravo teams, fighting each other in addition to computer-controlled enemies.

As in previous installments, the player can engage in conversations with other characters; as Kirito, one can do so with those in the canon, while the protagonist avatar has such dialogues with characters from the game universe.

== Synopsis ==
Fatal Bullet takes place in Gun Gale Online, a VRMMORPG that was introduced in the second season of the anime. Following the events of Sword Art Online: Hollow Realization, GGO was released by Zaskar following the advent of The Seed.

The player creates their own character, who joins GGO alongside their friend Kureha. During the story, the pair meet ArFA-sys, a humanoid AI, along with the rest of the main cast. In contrast with the light novels and anime, characters like Asuna and Leafa are present in GGO. Other new characters introduced in the game include Basalt Joe, a powerful player who frequently challenges the protagonist to claim ArFA-sys, Zeliska, a strong yet friendly player who also has an ArFA-sys, and Itsuki, a strategist and sniper with a preference for using traps like land mines.

The final chapter of the main campaign also offers a branching ending based on player choice and provides a third ending, called "True Ending" as the canon ending.

Series author Reki Kawahara supervised development of the game's story. As the game progresses, the player can switch to Kirito Mode, which allows them to play a different storyline.

== Development ==
Bandai Namco Entertainment trademarked "Fatal Bullet" on July 12, 2017. On August 14, 2017, a teaser called "Project 1514" showed a ruined city in a futuristic base. The game was finally revealed on August 18, 2017. It was developed by Japanese game developer Dimps. A Siliconera writer described the gameplay as bearing some similarity to Freedom Wars, another game produced by the same developer.Fatal Bullet runs on Unreal Engine 4.

Fatal Bullet is the first in the SAO series to be available on Xbox One and PC, the latter being downloadable through Steam.

== Reception ==
Reception

Aggregate score
Aggregator	Score
Metacritic	PC: 61/100; PS4: 64/100; XONE: 72/100; NS: 63/100

Review scores
Publication	Score
Destructoid	PS4: 7/10
Famitsu	31/40
IGN	5.9/10

Sword Art Online: Fatal Bullet received "mixed or average" reviews, according to video game review aggregator Metacritic. IGN had a mixed rating, saying: "...the poor story pacing and the repetitive nature of exploration dragged it down. While it's a good change of pace for games based on SAO, it still lacks the polish needed to really stand out." Rating the PlayStation 4 version a 7/10, indicating "Good", Josh Tolentino from Destructoid said it was: "Solid and definitely has an audience. There could be some hard-to-ignore faults, but the experience is fun."

=== Sales ===
In Japan, approximately 11,770 physical units for Switch were sold during its launch week becoming the number five selling game of any format.
