= Accel World vs. Sword Art Online =

2017 video game

- Developer: Artdink
- Publisher: Bandai Namco Entertainment
- Platforms: Microsoft Windows, PlayStation 4, PlayStation Vita
- Release: PlayStation 4, PlayStation Vita: JP: March 16, 2017; WW: July 7, 2017; Microsoft Windows: WW: September 12, 2017
- Genre: Action role-playing
- Modes: Single-player, multiplayer

Accel World vs. Sword Art Online (Note: Known in Japan as Accel World vs. Sword Art Online: Millennium Twilight (アクセルワールド VS ソードアート・オンライン 千年の黄昏)) is a Japanese action role-playing video game developed by Artdink and published by Bandai Namco Entertainment for the PlayStation 4, PlayStation Vita, and Microsoft Windows. It is a crossover between Accel World and Sword Art Online, both light novel series written by Reki Kawahara.

== Plot ==
The story begins with Asuna and Kirito from Sword Art Online being on a picnic with Yui, looking for a spot. Suddenly, they were attacked by the monsters despite the location being a neutral one. After that, an alarm starts alerting everyone to log out at once or be punished. Yui warns Asuna and Kirito to leave before running away, but they follow her to a shrine instead. Kirito is there attacked by Accel World's Black Lotus, who was hired by a witch named Persona Vabel as a diversion while she managed to seal away Yui in plans to start an apocalypse. Realizing she was tricked by the witch, Black Lotus decides to help Kirito and Asuna. Because Persona Vabel is powerful, the trio retreats. They concluded that since they have ignored the logout warning, some of their friends must have as well. The goal is to recruit those, while figuring out why are their worlds colliding, and what Persona Vabel's plans are.

== Gameplay ==
Accel World vs. Sword Art Online is a team-based game (with all voiced dialogue in Japanese with English subtitles), where any of the three members can be switched at any time, each with their own attacks and abilities. To make a progress in the game's story mode, there are numerous main quests to complete. There are also side quests that are not necessary but will make playing the game much easier, thanks to the rewards and additional experience. Inspired by Sword Art Online: Lost Song, combat consists of melee (Accel World characters), learning skills, and occasional flying for aerial combat (Sword Art Online characters). All battles take place in an open environment the moment a contact is made with enemies. There is a hub called the Floating City of Ryne, which contains shops that allow for improving characters.

== Reception ==
Reception

Aggregate scores
Aggregator	Score
Metacritic	PS4: 64/100
OpenCritic	17% recommend

Upon its release, the game was met with "mixed or average reviews" with an aggregate score of 64/100 for PlayStation 4 on Metacritic. Fellow review aggregator OpenCritic assessed that the game received fair approval, being recommended by 17% of critics.
