= Sword Art Online: Lost Song =

2015 video game

- Developer: Artdink
- Publisher: Bandai Namco Entertainment
- Producer: Yousuke Futami
- Series: Sword Art Online
- Platforms: PlayStation 3, PlayStation Vita, PlayStation 4, Windows
- Release: JP: March 26, 2015; PAL: November 13, 2015 (exc. PS3); NA: November 17, 2015 (exc. PS3); JP: November 19, 2015 (PS4); WW: November 13, 2018 (Windows)
- Genre: Action role-playing
- Modes: Single-player, multiplayer

Sword Art Online: Lost Song (ソードアート・オンライン -ロスト・ソング-, Sōdo Āto Onrain -Rosuto Songu-) is a Japanese action role-playing video game for the PlayStation 3, PlayStation Vita, PlayStation 4 and Microsoft Windows based on the Sword Art Online light novel series. It is the third video game in the series and is the successor to the 2014 game Sword Art Online: Hollow Fragment. The game was released worldwide during 2015; it was first released in Japan on March 26, and was later released in the PAL region and North America on November 13 and 17, respectively.

Lost Song's story is based on an alternate timeline of Sword Art Online that does not follow the canon storyline of the light novels. It follows series protagonist Kirito and his friends as they play the Virtual Reality Massively Multiplayer Online Role-Playing Game (VRMMORPG) called ALfheim Online (ALO). The game introduces a guild named Shamrock, led by scientist and idol Seven, who Kirito competes against to be the first to clear ALO's expansion, Svart ALfheim.

Lost Song received mostly mixed reviews, with the multiplayer and controls being praised; however, the game's dungeons were criticized for being bland and recycled. Reviewers also stated the game appeals more to fans of the series. A sequel, Sword Art Online: Hollow Realization, was announced at Dengeki Bunko Fall Fest 2015 for PS4 and Vita, with a release date set in 2016.

== Gameplay ==
Kirito and Sinon talking. Lost Song's conversation system is presented in a visual novel style, with static images and text.

Unlike its predecessors, which have MMORPG-like gameplay, Lost Song is labeled as an action game instead of a role-playing game. It is the first game in the series that allows one to play as characters besides protagonist Kirito; there are 19 characters available, though two are only attainable through downloadable content. Additionally, players can create their own character to use in the game's story mode. Regardless of which character is being used, the story will progress as if the player is Kirito. Each character can wield three types of weapons—for instance, Kirito can dual-wield or use a one- or two-handed sword—and weapons have skills that can be trained to unlock new abilities.

While in battle, a party consists of three members: the player and two player-selected characters. Fighting is performed on the ground and in the air, with the latter allowing the player to move freely, although players cannot fly in dungeons and are restricted to an altitude limit during the early portion of the story. Auto-attacking, which is disabled during flight, enables other party members to automatically attack an enemy in close enough proximity without command from the player. In combat, the player can assign magic spells and attacks for the other two party members to use. The type of spells available depends on the race of the character; for example, Salamanders use fire-based spells, while the sylph use wind magic. In a party, the character that the player assigns to perform magic is not targeted by enemies. During combat, there is a "Union" gauge which, when filled, allows players to perform the "switch attack", where one character attacks first and a party member immediately follows with a second attack.

The game has multiplayer, allowing players to engage in player versus player (PvP) duels. Online capability is also available, with a lobby featuring up to 16 players who can be split into four-person parties to complete quests, such as fighting stronger versions of bosses found in single-player. Four-player groups can also participate in PvP as 4v4 battles.

== Synopsis ==
=== Setting and characters ===
Lost Song takes place in Svart ALfheim, a set of floating continents in ALfheim Online. Two of the continents are "Flosshilde", an ice-based region, and "Woglinde", a grassy area with windmills.

Based in the same continuity as Hollow Fragment, the game follows an alternate timeline from the original series; instead of escaping Sword Art Online on floor 75 like in canon, the players were forced to progress through the game's remaining 25 floors. Lost Song occurs at the same chronological point as the Gun Gale Online arc in Sword Art Online II, but the characters are instead exploring ALfheim Online, the newest virtual reality MMORPG to be released. Lost Song introduces three new characters that play a role in the plot: Nanairo "Seven" Arshavin, an idol and Russian scientist studying virtual reality; Nijika "Rain" Karatachi, an SAO survivor and Seven's older sister who follows Kirito during the story; and Sumeragi, Seven's bodyguard. Seven and Sumeragi are leaders of a guild called Shamrock, Seven being the head. While Seven is at a lower level, her guild mates are among the strongest players in ALO, with 30 percent of the top 100 players being Shamrock members. Sumeragi is the top swordsman in ALO, having defeated Eugene, the general of the Salamander race, in battle. Rain is a former member of the guild, being expelled after lying to other guild members, followed by capitalizing on the time between her removal and the official de-registration of her guild status to steal information.

=== Plot ===
After the events of Hollow Fragment and escaping Sword Art Online, Kirito expresses an interest in playing ALO, and decides to join after hearing of Seven's work in the game. Rain, aware of Kirito's feats in SAO, decides to follow him, though he notices her presence. The two eventually meet when she was attacked by a field monster in a valley, and Kirito invites her to join his adventures.

Kirito begins to express doubts about Shamrock and Seven's fan club, and decides to attend one of her concerts. There, he notices that the attendees become motivated to perform Seven's interests that she mentions onstage. Seven later reveals that Sumeragi is her research partner for a project she is working on, known as the Cloud Brain. She describes the experiment as a network that unites ALO players' emotions into one, as seen at the concert. She invites Kirito to assist her in creating it, but he turns it down, as he wants to enjoy playing the game with his friends.

Returning to the final dungeon, Kirito notices Sumeragi, who challenges him to a duel. After being teleported to a different area, the two begin fighting. With the usage of Skill Connect, a game exploit in which two consecutive Sword Skills are used without delay, Kirito defeats Sumeragi. Kirito advances through the dungeon to confront Seven, while Sumeragi and other Shamrock members transfer their Original Sword Skills (OSS) to her.

Upon reaching the boss room, Kirito finds out that Seven had already defeated it by herself. While she discusses the results of the project, Rain questions her actions and how they interfere with her idol status. The three begin fighting, and despite possessing a wide array of OSS, Seven is defeated. An angered Seven proclaims that she will be the one who clears Svart ALfheim and her avatar corrupts as a result of overload from the OSS. As the battle continues, Rain tells Seven that she does not want to fight, and after Seven's loss, Rain consoles her while her HP decreases to zero.

Afterwards, Seven stops performing concerts ingame, as Shamrock membership declines. After logging out, Kirito meets Rain and learns of the rift between her and Seven that prompted her to play ALO. Back in ALO, Seven meets Rain again; Rain tells her about their childhood and their split after their parents divorced. After she was reminded of two Russian greetings that Rain had taught her, Seven's memories return and the two are finally reunited.

== Development ==
The game's development was officially announced at the Tokyo Game Show on September 19, 2014, with the working title of SAO III. While predecessors Sword Art Online: Infinity Moment and Hollow Fragment were developed by Aquria, Artdink was selected to develop Lost Song. For the game's theme music, Eir Aoi and Luna Haruna, who performed the theme songs for the anime, had their singles "Cynthia no Hikari" (シンシアの光, Cynthia's Light) and "Yoru no Niji wo Koete" (夜の虹を越えて, Over the Night Rainbow), featured in the game as the opening and ending themes, respectively.

=== Marketing and release ===
As a supplement, Re: Hollow Fragment, an improved version of Hollow Fragment, was bundled with Lost Song as Sword Art Online: Game Director's Edition and released in Japan on November 19. Re: Hollow Fragment was also available as a free downloadable if players pre-ordered Lost Song. At Dengeki Game Festival 2015, it was announced that Lost Song and God Eater 2, also published by Bandai Namco Games, would have DLC from the other game: on April 9, Dengeki PlayStation magazine released a serial code of Kirito and Sinon's costumes for God Eater 2, and 14 days later, released a code of GE2 characters Julius and Alisa's costumes for Lost Song. At Tokyo Game Show 2015, Kuroyukihime, from Sword Art Online author Reki Kawahara's series Accel World, was added as another playable character in Lost Song.

Lost Song was released in Japan for the PS3 and Vita on March 26, 2015, while a Traditional Chinese version was released on April 28. An English-subtitled version of the game was released in Asia on May 12, the PAL regions on November 13, and North America on November 17, with the English-subtitled PS3 port being an Indonesian-exclusive.

== Reception ==
Reception

Aggregate score
Aggregator	Score
Metacritic	PS4: 63/100; Vita: 70/100

Review scores
Publication	Score
Destructoid	6/10
Famitsu	32/40
GameRevolution	3/5
Hardcore Gamer	3/5
IGN	6/10
PlayStation LifeStyle	7/10

Sword Art Online: Lost Song received "mixed or average" reviews, according to video game review aggregator Metacritic. Destructoid writer Josh Tolentino believed, like its predecessors, Lost Song was meant for fans of the series. He praised the combat system for being less time-consuming in comparison to Hollow Fragment, though he criticized the dungeons as being bland and an "apathetic level design". Meghan Sullivan of IGN gave the game a score of 6/10, believing the controls are easy to use and commended the multiplayer, but stated that the enemies and dungeons are repetitive and considered the story to be dull. Hardcore Gamer's Jason Bohn stated that the game was "hamstrung by a lack of investment", noting the lack of English voice acting and the plot being told through static images. Meanwhile, PlayStation Lifestyle awarded it a score of 7 out of 10, calling it "a fun, lighthearted and breezy run through well-worn action-RPG territory."

Cubed3 gave the game an unfavorable score of 5 out of 10, stating, "While the title is primarily a fun gameplay experience at first with improved flight mechanics, its weak story, poor companion AI, excessive fan service, and heavily recycled late-game environments make it a lost cause for anyone who isn't a die-hard fan."

=== Sales ===
Within the first week of its release in Japan, the PS3 and Vita versions sold 55,090 and 139,298 copies, respectively, with a total of 194,388 copies being sold. The two versions' sales were the sixth- and second-most of the week, respectively. The numbers reached as high as 65,000 (PS3), 177,000 (Vita), and 18,000 (PS4). In a January 2016 interview, producer Yousuke Futami stated the game had sold 100,000 copies in North America—30,000 of which were downloaded—and 50,000 in Europe.

== Sequel ==
The sequel, Sword Art Online: Hollow Realization, was released in October 2016.
