= Sword Art Online: Hollow Realization =

2016 video game

- Developer: Aquria
- Publisher: Bandai Namco Entertainment
- Series: Sword Art Online
- Platforms: PlayStation 4, PlayStation Vita, Microsoft Windows, Nintendo Switch
- Release: PlayStation 4, PlayStation Vita: JP: October 27, 2016; WW: November 8, 2016; Microsoft Windows: WW: October 27, 2017; Nintendo Switch: JP: April 25, 2019; WW: May 24, 2019
- Genre: Role-playing
- Modes: Single-player, multiplayer

Sword Art Online: Hollow Realization (ソードアート・オンライン -ホロウ・リアリゼーション-, Sōdo Āto Onrain -Horō Riarizēshon-) is a Japanese video game developed by Aquria and published by Bandai Namco Entertainment for the PlayStation 4, PlayStation Vita, and Windows PC, based on the Japanese light novel series, Sword Art Online. It is the fourth video game in the series and the successor to Sword Art Online: Lost Song. Hollow Realization was released on October 27, 2016, in Japan, and on November 8, 2016, for North American and European territories. A Nintendo Switch version of the game was released on April 25, 2019, in Japan, and worldwide on May 24, 2019.

== Gameplay ==
Unlike in Sword Art Online: Hollow Fragment and Lost Song, a party in Hollow Realization consists of four characters including the player, instead of three. While HF is played like a role-playing game and LS like an action role-playing game, HR is based on HF's style, but with action elements integrated. Characters can be customized through in-game character creation, with gender, height, figure, weapons, and physical appearance changeable. Additionally, over 300 non-player characters appear in the game, with all of them being recruitable to join the player's party. Players can create special bonds with these characters by giving equipment to them. Strengthening the bond also increases the character's strength.

A new battle system also features in Hollow Realization, where the four-person team of players fight monsters using sword skills in a similar fashion to the original Sword Art Online game. Players can also direct and receive guidance from party members in collaborating to perform team strategies and attacks. Players perform chain attacks with party members using a "Switch" system for greater damage output against powerful monsters, including charged attacks and aerial combos. This includes "Named Monsters", which are monsters with significant strength that appear without warning. Set in a "wider world", Hollow Realization features monsters new to the series. A healing system in the game allows defeated characters to rejoin the battle as long as teammates are still fighting. The game features online multiplayer.

Hollow Realization is approximately 30 to 40 hours in length; however, completely finishing the game such as leveling up to the highest level and completing all the quests will take the player approximately 70 to 100 hours. The game has downloadable content, including the free expansion pack Fighters of the Blue Sky, featuring Sword Art Online: Lost Song characters Rain and Seven, a new PvP feature, and an additional story. The paid expansion pack Shrine Maiden of the Abyss, adds an additional three chapters.

== Synopsis ==
... You've always had to start at not-level 1 in all of the previous games—you know how Kirito would be level 100 at the start of the previous games, because he's already that level? I wanted to create a Sword Art Online game where players can start from level 1. That's the gameplay experience I would like to provide players. ... Now, the player can experience how Kirito adventures through the world of Sword Art: Origin from the base level.

— Yosuke Futami, producer

Hollow Realization takes place in Sword Art: Origin, a restoration of Aincrad titled Ainground, with intentions of research and development in the year 2026, three years after the original Sword Art Online event. However, unlike in Sword Art Online, Ainground is one large floor, instead of multiple, while the castle itself was renamed to Aincrad, where several monsters can be battled.

The main character of the game is a 14-year old AI, known as Premiere, that travels with Kirito. Although she is part of the game's initial release, a later patch would tweak her "vocabulary and personality" in-game to a "specific character", based on keywords in Twitter tweets as part of a promotional campaign featuring the character. These conversations with Twitter users would dictate her personality over time and ultimately decide if she would become a "good girl" or "bad girl" in-game.

Other prominent characters from the franchise such as Asuna, Leafa, Sinon, Lisbeth and Silica also feature.

== Development ==
The game was teased at Tokyo Game Show 2015 in September with the working title of SAO IV. It was officially announced at Dengeki Bunko Fall Fest by Bandai Namco on October 3. According to Bandai Namco Games producer Yosuke Futami, the game was devised with the idea of Kirito starting the game at level one. A Western release date was later announced, with Hollow Realization releasing in Japan on October 27 and internationally on November 8. The North American Vita release is digital-only.

Players who pre-ordered Sword Art Online: Hollow Realization via the PlayStation Store in Japan gain a one-week early access into part of the game's main story. The game will feature Japanese voices coupled with English, French, German, Italian, and Spanish subtitles. The opening theme is "Windia" by Luna Haruna. The ending theme is "Two of Us" by Haruka Tomatsu. An advertising campaign for the game, titled "Sword Art On-Nyaine", featured cats playing with toys but with Hollow Realization sounds dubbed over them.

A DLC called Chapter 1: Explorer of Illusory Mists became available starting on May 16, 2017. On July 21, 2017, the second expansion was released with the title Chapter II: Tuner of Causality. The last post-release content was released on September 26, 2017, closing the Abyss of the Shrine Maiden saga and it was titled Chapter III: The One Who Opposes God released on September 26, 2017.

== Reception ==
Reception

Aggregate score
Aggregator	Score
Metacritic	PS4: 69/100; VITA: 56/100; NS: 68/100

Review scores
Publication	Score
Destructoid	7.5/10
Famitsu	32/40
GameSpot	5/10
IGN	6.7/10

Sword Art Online: Hollow Realization received "mixed or average" reviews, according to video game review aggregator Metacritic. Both PlayStation 4 and Vita versions received final scores of 32/40 by Famitsu, being awarded 9, 8, 7 and 8 by four individual reviewers.

Vince Ingenito of IGN awarded Hollow Realization a score of 6.7 out of 10, describing it as an "action-oriented, single-player faux-MMO with satisfying, nuanced combat" but criticizing its "opaque systems, intrusive pacing, and lack of narrative stakes." GameSpot's Janine Hawkins gave the game a score of 5 out of 10, calling it an "action-RPG fused with visual-novel trappings" and criticizing its bugs, clumsy UI, and poor execution. Josh Tolentino of Destructoid gave Hollow Realization a rating of 7.5 out of 10, calling it a "mechanically satisfying action-RPG that convincingly evokes MMO trappings" and praising its combat, systems, and visuals while criticizing the loose pacing and familiar, low-stakes story.
