= Sword Art Online: Hollow Fragment =

2014 video game

- Japanese cover art for PlayStation Vita
- Developer: Aquria
- Publisher: Bandai Namco Games
- Producer: Yosuke Futami
- Series: Sword Art Online
- Platforms: PlayStation Vita, PlayStation 4, Microsoft Windows
- Release: PlayStation Vita: JP: April 24, 2014; NA: August 19, 2014; EU: August 20, 2014; PlayStation 4: NA: July 28, 2015; EU: August 4, 2015; JP: November 19, 2015; Microsoft Windows: WW: August 21, 2018
- Genre: Role-playing
- Modes: Single-player, multiplayer

Sword Art Online: Hollow Fragment (ソードアート・オンライン -ホロウ・フラグメント-, Sōdo Āto Onrain -Horō Furagumento-) is a Japanese video game for the PlayStation Vita based on the Sword Art Online light novel series. It is the second console video game in the series, the first being Sword Art Online: Infinity Moment, the content of which is included in Hollow Fragment. The game was released in Japan on April 24, 2014, North America on August 19, 2014 and Europe and Australia on August 20, 2014.

A "Director's Cut" edition of the game titled Sword Art Online Re: Hollow Fragment was released on PlayStation 4 within North America, Europe, Australia, and the Middle East in July and August 2015, and was released in Japan in November 2015. This version comes with new features, including an online play mode, additional bosses and the ability to play as a female character, among others.

Hollow Fragment was succeeded by Sword Art Online: Lost Song, which was released in 2015 for the PlayStation 4 and Vita.

== Gameplay ==
The game has over 100 recruitable characters which can be chosen to accompany the player in the game's dungeons. Gameplay combines elements of a MMORPG—albeit in a simulated fashion as it is not an online game, though it does include limited multiplayer via ad hoc for up to four players—as well as elements of a dating sim.

== Plot ==
The game takes place in the same continuity as the prior game in the series, Sword Art Online: Infinity Moment, which exists in an alternate storyline from the Sword Art Online anime storyline. Hollow Fragment takes place midway through the anime first arc.

The player controls the main character Kirito, who has been trapped in the titular virtual reality MMORPG where dying in the game will lead to his death in real life as well. Part of the game is actually a high definition recompilation of Sword Art Online: Infinity Moment, the original game in the series released for the PlayStation Portable, including all content of "Floor Clearing" from the previous game with the addition of new unexplored "Hollow Area" of Aincrad.

== Development ==
The game was released on April 23, 2014 in Japan and May 29, 2014 in Taiwan, Hong Kong, as well as some Southeast Asian countries with Chinese and English subtitles. It had also been announced that the game would be localized into English and released August 19, 2014 in North America and August 20 in Europe and Australia. The American/European/Australian release is digital download only. The game also received an update adding content extending the game's play time by 30 hours, including new areas, gameplay, and costumes, while also raising the level cap from 200 to 250. The game also features costume DLC.

== Reception ==
Reception

Aggregate score
Aggregator	Score
Metacritic	VITA: 67/100; PS4: 65/100

The game sold 145,029 physical retail copies within the first week of release in Japan, topping the Japanese software sales charts for that week, slightly outselling its predecessor, Infinity Moment, which sold 138,180 copies. By July 2014, it outsold the previous game's total copies sold domestically, which is roughly 200,000 copies, and sold more than 280,000 copies in Japan by December 2014. The game was the top-selling digital Vita game on both the European region and North American region PlayStation Store in August and September 2014, which added up to more than 450,000 copies sold worldwide as of December 2014. Of these, approximately 90,000 copies were sold in Asia, and 70,000 copies were sold in North America.

The game received a Famitsu review score of 32/40. An import review by PlayStation Lifestyle gave the Japanese version of the game a rating of 9/10, noting that the game provides plenty of hours' worth of content and has no obvious performance issues which affect the gameplay experience. The Asian version of the game, which was localized into English and Chinese, was noted by The Straits Times to contain various localization errors, such as grammar and spelling mistakes within the subtitled dialogue; nevertheless, the game was given a review score of 8/10. The production team is said to be aware of the problems regarding the game's English translation and it have been stated that its sequel would be translated differently to produce a better translation.

Following its release in the west, the game received mixed reviews. It has a score of 67 out of 100 on Metacritic. IGN awarded it a score of 5.5 out of 10, saying Sword Art Online's excellent combat is marred by a juvenile romance system, a horrible translation. Destructoid gave the game a rating of 7/10, noting that the game is solid and provides a fun experience, however may lack replay value, while Gaming Age gave the game a "B" score, praising the game environment and mechanics, although noting that the camera controls feel flawed. PlayStation Universe awarded it a score of 5.5 out of 10, saying "Sword Art Online: Hollow Fragment will only offer the most enjoyment to hardcore fans of the franchise that are willing to slog through the uninspired, tedious gameplay to get to the ample fan service on offer." GameZone gave a rating of 8/10, praising the amount of content available within the game. Twinfinite gave the game a 4/5, criticizing the steep learning curve and the dialogue translation, while finding the combat and game design to be positive. Nevertheless, Hardcore Gamer rated Hollow Fragment a score of 1.5 out of 5, referring to it as a bad game and an imbecilic software, that is the most debase garbage Japan has to offer, and comes with an awful story, combat, and translation.

RPGamer gave the game an unfavorable review, stating, "While the title is primarily a fun gameplay experience overall, it’s marred by inescapable narrative issues and a terrible localisation that makes it a difficult recommendation for those who aren't already dedicated fans of the series." GamingBolt gave it a rating of 2 out of 10, lambasting Hollow Fragment as a "sleazy, monotonous mess" and "arguably the worst title of the year" and criticizing its trash localization, mindless dungeon progression, and creepy emphasis on sexual fan service, while warning non-fans to "stay far away from it."
