= Sword Art Online: Infinity Moment =

2013 video game

- Developer: Aquria
- Publisher: Namco Bandai Games
- Series: Sword Art Online
- Platform: PlayStation Portable
- Release: JP: March 14, 2013
- Genre: Role-playing
- Mode: Single-player

Sword Art Online: Infinity Moment (ソードアート・オンライン -インフィニティ・モーメント-, Sōdo Āto Onrain -Infiniti Mōmento-) is a 2013 Japanese video game based on the Sword Art Online light novel series. The game was released in both standard and limited edition box sets in Japan on March 14, 2013, for PlayStation Portable. A 2014 sequel, Sword Art Online: Hollow Fragment, includes all of the original game's content.

== Gameplay ==
The gameplay has many similarities to MMORPGs, though it is not an online game, including the ability to buy and upgrade weapons, take on quests, and fight in a group with other characters. The protagonist, Kirito, can equip ten types of weapons, such as swords, daggers, and axes.

Combat revolves around attacking automatically solo or with one party member and mainly dealing damage using sword skills that consume "SP" upon activation. Players can modify their skill palette to speed the flow of battle to their liking, allowing for much customizability. Like the original source material, skills are learned by increasing a weapon's proficiency bar and spending skill points obtained. With the player's party member of their choosing (though they're initially chosen for them during the first several floors), players can dish out damage using "Skill Chains" by unleashing sword skills simultaneously. Depending on the strength and combination of sword skills, Skill Chains can vary in levels, ranging from simple bursts to multi-hit flurries dealing tens to hundred thousands of damage.

Players can instruct their party member to follow various commands, such as switching, using sword skills, or parrying an incoming attack. Kirito can choose the main heroines and cast of the franchise to accompany him, or recruit other NPCs who belong to the made-up guilds of the game after assisting them in either leveling up or procuring a specific item.

Similar to its sequel, the game encourages multiple playthroughs to obtain certain items, unlock more events, and complete side quests that were unfinished or unobtainable the first time around. However, since it doesn't have the extra content its successor has, there's not much to explore.

== Plot ==
The game follows an alternate storyline from the end of the first arc of the original story, in which a glitch causes Kirito and the other players to remain in Sword Art Online despite defeating Heathcliff, and players from other VRMMORPGs, such as second and third arc protagonists Leafa and Sinon, get sucked into the game themselves.

== Development ==
The game was released on March 14, 2013, in Japan for the PlayStation Portable. In June 2014, Bandai Namco released a patch that added a new game mode, which added additional gameplay after completion of the main storyline.

== Reception ==
The game sold 138,180 physical retail copies within the first week of release in Japan, topping the Japanese software sales charts for that week. By June 2013, it had shipped over 200,000 copies. Famitsu awarded it scores of 8, 7, 7 and 7 out of 10, totaling 29 out of 40.

== Remake ==
The game was remade for the PlayStation Vita in the form of Sword Art Online: Hollow Fragment. Some features, like the player's points and skills, can be transferred from Infinity Moment to Hollow Fragment.
