= The Final Table =

American cooking reality competition show

- Genre: Cooking show
- Directed by: Russell Norman
- Presented by: Andrew Knowlton
- Country of origin: United States
- Original language: English
- No. of seasons: 1
- No. of episodes: 10

Production
- Executive producers: Robin Ashbrook and Yasmin Shackleton
- Cinematography: Ramy Romany
- Running time: 53–59 minutes

Original release
- Network: Netflix
- Release: November 20, 2018

The Final Table is an American cooking competition and reality television series hosted by food writer and critic Andrew Knowlton, and filmed in Los Angeles, California for Netflix. The first season was released on November 20, 2018. It features twelve international teams of two professional chefs each competing to create elevated dishes based on the country chosen for each episode. The first round is judged by a three-person panel—a food critic, and two culturally significant citizens, all representing the episode's country—assessing each team's interpretation of their chosen nationally significant dish. Interspersed among the cooking activities are video packages featuring the culinary biographies of the contestants.

The second round of each episode is The Final Plate Challenge. A chef, who already has an honorary seat at The Final Table, picks an ingredient representing their country's cooking culture, and then judges each team's dish highlighting that ingredient, eliminating one or two teams. In the first seven episodes, the bottom three teams are up for elimination in the second round, in the eighth and ninth episodes, only one team is not up for elimination.

For the finale, the nine chef judges from each episode return, and are featured at The Final Table along with signature dishes they had each created that changed the food world. The final two competing chef teams break up and compete as individuals. Each of the four contestants must prepare a signature dish that defines them as a chef, and will “cause ripples around the culinary world”.

== Chefs ==
Each chef was paired with a fellow chef that they knew from their personal or professional life before the event. The 12 teams were:

| (France) Benjamin Bensoussan (Spain) Manuel Berganza | (Australia) Mark Best (Australia) Shane Osborn | (United States) Aaron Bludorn (United Kingdom) Graham Campbell | (Jamaica) Collin Brown (Mexico) Colibri Jimenez |
| (New Zealand) Monique Fiso (India) Amninder Sandhu | (Brazil) Rafa Gil (Mexico) Esdras Ochoa | (Australia) Alex Haupt (South Africa) Ash Heeger | (United States) Timothy Hollingsworth (Canada) Darren MacLean |
| (United States) Ronald Hsu (Japan) Shin Takagi | (United Kingdom) James Knappett (Mexico) Angel Vazquez | (United States) Jessica Lorigo (United States) Johnny Spero | (France) Charles Michel (Ecuador) Rodrigo Pacheco |

== Episodes ==
=== Season 1 ===
| No. | Title | First Round Judges | The Final Plate Judge | National Dish | Final Plate Ingredient |
|---|---|---|---|---|---|
| 1 | "Mexico" | Julio César Chávez, Martha Higareda, Mariana Camacho | Enrique Olvera | Taco | Opuntia |
| 2 | "Spain" | Ana Polvorosa, Miguel Bosé, Borja Beneyto | Andoni Aduriz | Paella | Octopus |
| 3 | "United Kingdom" | Cat Deeley, Gary Lineker, Jay Rayner | Clare Smyth | English breakfast | English pea |
| 4 | "Brazil" | Alessandra Ambrosio, Bebel Gilberto, Josimar Melo | Helena Rizzo | Feijoada | Cassava |
| 5 | "India" | Hasan Minhaj, R. Madhavan, Rashmi Uday Singh | Vineet Bhatia | Vegetarian murgh makhani (butter chicken) | Coconut |
| 6 | "USA" | Dax Shepard, Colin Hanks, Sam Sifton | Grant Achatz | Thanksgiving dinner | Pumpkin |
| 7 | "Italy" | Andrea Petrini, Alessandro Del Piero, Eleonora Cozzella | Carlo Cracco | Pasta | Artichoke |
| 8 | "Japan" | Hikari Mori, Yuji Ayabe, Akiko Katayama | Yoshihiro Narisawa | Kaiseki | Sea urchin |
| 9 | "France" | François-Régis Gaudry, Estérelle Payany | Anne-Sophie Pic | Hare à la royale | Egg |
| 10 | "The Finale" | N/A | All the Final Table chefs | N/A | N/A |

== Contestants' progress ==
| Placement | Contestants | Mexico | Spain | UK | Brazil | India | USA | Italy | Japan | France | The Finale |
|---|---|---|---|---|---|---|---|---|---|---|---|
| 1 | Darren MacLean (Canada) and Timothy Hollingsworth (United States) | | | | | | | | | | (Note: Only Timothy Hollingsworth won, Darren MacLean was a runner-up along with Shane Osborn and Mark Best.) |
| 2 | Shane Osborn (Australia) and Mark Best (Australia) | | | | | | | | | | |
| 3 | Charles Michel (Colombia & France) and Rodrigo Pacheco (Ecuador) | | | | | | | | | | |
| 4 | Esdras Ochoa (Mexico) and Rafa Gil (Brazil) | | | | | | | | | | |
| 5 | Aaron Bludorn (United States) and Graham Campbell (Scotland, United Kingdom) | | | | | | | | | | |
| 6 | Manuel Berganza (Spain & Singapore) and Benjamin Bensoussan (France) | | | | | | | | | | |
| 7 | Monique Fiso (New Zealand) and Amninder Sandhu (India) | | | | | | | | | | |
| 8 | Alex Haupt (Australia & Germany) and Ash Heeger (South Africa) | | | | | | | | | | |
| 9 | Jessica Lorigo (Spain) and Johnny Spero (United States) | | | | | | | | | | |
| 10 | Shin Takagi (Japan) and Ronald Hsu (United States) | | | | | | | | | | |
| 11 | Collin Brown (Jamaica) and Collibri Jimenez (Mexico) | | | | | | | | | | |
| 12 | James Knappett (United Kingdom) and Angel Vazquez (Mexico) | | | | | | | | | | |

The contestants cooked the best dishes in the challenge.
The contestants were nominated, but cooked the best dish of the final plate round.
The contestants were nominated, but they weren't eliminated and they didn't cook the best dish of the final plate round.
The contestants were eliminated in the final plate round.
The contestants were safe.
The winner was part of the team.
The contestants were finalists, but did not win.
The contestants were already eliminated in previous episodes.

== Reception ==
=== Critical response ===
Upon release, the show received a mixed response from critics. On review aggregation website Rotten Tomatoes, the series holds a 50% approval rating based on 6 reviews, with an average rating of 4.67 out of 10.

In a review for The Guardian, critic Lucy Mangan described the show as "bombastic and barely watchable", giving the show two out of five stars. In a more positive review, David Sexton wrote in the Evening Standard that fans of MasterChef will "love this". David Levesley of GQ noted the high and low points of the show, writing that it contained "the perfect blend of trash and intellect".

=== Awards and nominations ===
| Year | Award | Category | Recipient | Result |
|---|---|---|---|---|
| 2019 | 71st Directors Guild of America Awards | Outstanding Directing – Reality Programs | "Japan"; Russell Norman | Won |
