= Food Wars! Shokugeki no Soma season 5 =

2020 Japanese television season

Food Wars! Shokugeki no Soma: The Fifth Plate
- Season 5
- Back cover art of the first Blu-ray compilation, featuring Soma Yukihira (left) and Erina Nakiri (right)
- No. of episodes: 13

Release
- Original network: Tokyo MX, BS11, Animax
- Original release: April 11 – September 26, 2020

Season chronology
- ← Previous; The Fourth Plate

The fifth and final season of Food Wars!: Shokugeki no Soma anime television series, subtitled Food Wars! Shokugeki no Soma: The Fifth Plate (食戟のソーマ 豪ノ皿, Shokugeki no Sōma: Gou no Sara), was produced by J.C.Staff and directed by Yoshitomo Yonetani. The series was first broadcast in Japan on Tokyo MX. It aired from April 11 to September 26, 2020. The opening theme is "Last Chapter" by Nano Ripe, while the ending theme song is "Crossing Road" by Mai Fuchigami. On April 17, 2020, it was announced that after the second episode, the remaining episodes of season would be delayed until further notice due to the effects of the COVID-19 pandemic. In late May 2020, it was announced that weekly new episodes would resume on July 18 after Japanese TV stations reran the first two episodes on July 4 and July 11.

In the United States, Adult Swim's Toonami programming block ran the English dub from March 19 to June 18, 2023.

== Episodes ==
No. overall	No. in season	Title (Note: English translated titles are taken from Crunchyroll.)	Directed by	Storyboarded by	Original release date	English air date
74	1	"Final Exams"; Transliteration: "Gakkimatsu Shiken" (Japanese: 学期末試験)	Ei Tanaka	Kouichi Takada	April 11, 2020	March 19, 2023
With the finals for Totsuki's first term arriving, Soma and his classmates in the Elite Ten are given the challenge to renovate an abandoned beach restaurant and earn a 3 million yen profit within three days. Meanwhile, the rest of the class are given easier assignments to run existing restaurants. In addition, the exams are being overseen by a new instructor, Suzuki. Suzuki seems to take an interest in Soma, who gets the impression he has met Suzuki before. Soma and his classmates are only able to open their restaurant on the third and final day due to the renovations they needed to make. However, they are able to attract a massive crowd thanks to their special yakisoba, which uses a combination of vegetables, minced squid, squid ink, red olive oil, and soft boiled egg yolks. By the end of the day, they are able to make their quota and pass the exam. However, as they make their summer vacation plans, Dojima arrives and informs them that the most prestigious cooking competition in the world, BLUE, is set to begin soon.
75	2	"The BLUE Preliminaries"; Transliteration: "Ao no Zenshōsen" (Japanese: 青の前哨戦)	Makoto Sokuza	Yoshitomo Yonetani	April 18, 2020	March 26, 2023
While Erina has a special invitation for BLUE, only three students from Totsuki will be allowed to participate. In order to determine the three students who will participate, Erina organizes the BLUE Preliminaries, pitting Totsuki's most talented students against each other. With the theme being soup, all the gathered students begin making their dishes. Soma makes third place with his Golden Eggs filled with hamburg steak, yakiniku, omelet rice, and fried salmon soups. Takumi makes second place with his cheese fondue minestrone soup. Megumi earns first place with her seafood meatballs filled with various different types of miso soup. Meanwhile, in the United States, Joichiro is defeated in a cooking match against an unknown challenger. One week before BLUE is scheduled to start, Suzuki challenges Soma to an unofficial Shokugeki, explaining he needs a win against the First Seat to earn a spot in BLUE himself so he can achieve his dream of making Erina his bride. Soma accepts under the condition that Suzuki reveal the secret he is hiding if Soma wins.
76	3	"Noir"; Transliteration: "Nowāru" (Japanese: 真夜中の料理人(ノワール))	Iku Suzuki	Yoshitomo Yonetani	July 18, 2020	April 2, 2023
After hearing and accepting Soma's terms if he wins, Suzuki states his terms by collecting Soma's knife if he wins. The challenge between Suzuki and Soma begins with Megumi as the judge. They both make pork cutlet dishes, but Suzuki's use of Chantilly sauce beats Soma's black cheese sauce. However, Suzuki does not collect Soma's knife, calling it inferior to Joichiro's knife. Suzuki reveals that he beat Joichiro and took his knife as a reward, and that his real name is Asahi Saiba. Asahi tells Erina he wants to marry her, but she declines. Soma returns home, meeting Joichiro outside. Back at Tōtsuki, Gin contacts Erina and warns her about Asahi. Both Gin and Joichiro explain that Asahi was an orphan who had been accepted as Joichiro's only student and took his original last name "Saiba". Joichiro eventually stopped visiting Asahi's orphange so he could properly run his diner and raise Soma. Gin tells Erina that Asahi is a part of the NOIR (Chefs of the Night), an organization of underworld chefs who were invited to compete in the BLUE by the Book Master of the WGO. Later that night, Asahi tells Erina that he wishes to defeat her and win the BLUE in order to marry her. Erina vows to defeat him for insulting her and Tōtsuki. After Soma vows to take revenge on Asahi at the BLUE, Joichiro tells him the secret of becoming a great chef: dedicating all his cooking to someone else.
77	4	"The Last Supper"; Transliteration: "Saigo no Bansan" (Japanese: 最後の晩餐)	Nana Fujiwara	Iku Suzuki	July 25, 2020	April 9, 2023
Soma, Megumi, and Takumi arrive at the site of the BLUE Tournament along with Saiba and the Noirs. The WGO Book Master explains that contestants will have to pass through three gates, each requiring completing a special culinary challenge to open, before reaching the main castle keep where they will compete in front of the Book Master herself. However, Asahi reveals that he has been seeded to the third gate. Erina then reveals that she will have to pass her own special set of trials separate from the rest of the contestants. Soma, Megumi, and Takumi are then separated into different groups. Soma's group is tasked with creating dishes that will satisfy Tokiyama Heigoro, an elderly Ex-Noir looking for a dish that will be a worthy last supper. The regular chefs are unable to satisfy Heigoro, while the Noirs easily pass. Asahi explains that only Noirs can understand the significance of a last meal thanks to their underworld experience. Soma serves Heigoro monaka with a monkfish liver filling. Soma then chastises Heigoro, pointing out he should stop looking for last suppers and instead take the opportunity to explore and eat new foods he's never seen before. This shocks Heigoro, who was planning on committing suicide after the tournament, and he resolves to keep on living to explore as many tastes as he can. Soma passes the first gate along with Megumi and Takumi. They express confusion that this BLUE does not seem to be focusing on gourmet like previous tournaments. Meanwhile, Erina is forced to face off against a gauntlet of chefs. As Soma, Megumi, and Takumi pass through the first gate, they are shocked to meet Tsukasa.
78	5	"Convenience Store Brawl"; Transliteration: "Konbini Rantō" (Japanese: コンビニ乱闘)	Ryo Ando	Ryo Ando	August 1, 2020	April 16, 2023
The judge for the second challenge, Rantabi, instructs all of the chefs that they are to create a dish from nothing but ingredients available from a regular convenience store. Any dish that she judges to be worth more than $100 will pass the challenge. Soma prepares a sukiyaki beef bowl, but is fined $14 for wasting ingredients. Tsukasa submits his chicken and beef dish with demi-glace, which earns a price a $587. Soma's second try is an osechi set, which catches Rantabi off guard when she realizes that no matter which order she eats it in, the different side dishes never conflict. She passes Soma's dish but refuses to divulge how much it is worth. Meanwhile, Erina defeats the gauntlet of the chefs who failed the first challenges, only to be tasked with facing off another gauntlet against the chefs who lost the second challenge. Megumi and Takumi manages to pass the second challenge with $128 and $150 dishes respectively. The remaining chefs are then led to the second gate, where they are met by three of the top ranking Noir chefs. The Book Master then makes a surprise announcement, declaring that the winner of this year's BLUE will become her personal chef.
79	6	"A Midsummer Christmas"; Transliteration: "Manatsu no Kurisumasu" (Japanese: 真夏のクリスマス)	Seung Deok Kim	Kouichi Takada	August 8, 2020	April 23, 2023
The Book Master declares that the third challenge will be to impress three of the WGO's top judges. The Noir Chefs Sarge, Marcanta, Claude Ville, and Bunny Hare, who specialize in extremely unconventional but effective methods of cooking unique to themselves, easily pass. Many of the regular chefs are intimidated by the skill the Noir chefs present, but Soma, Megumi, Takumi, and Tsukasa easily pass as well. Erina meanwhile takes on the losers of the third challenge in another gauntlet. With the preliminary challenges completed, the competition transitions into a conventional tournament, with Soma being matched against Sarge in the first round with the theme being to bake a Christmas cake. Sarge uses a combination of a chainsaw, sledgehammer, and explosives to bake a Cluster Bomb Cake, which creates explosions of flavor in the mouth of anybody who eats it. Soma responds by obtaining a number of convenience store ingredients and a wooden ice cream spoon and using them to create his Midsummer Christmas Cake, which he presents to the judges.
80	7	"Crossed Knives"; Transliteration: "Kurosu Naibuzu" (Japanese: 交差する刃(クロスナイブズ))	Ei Tanaka	Ei Tanaka	August 15, 2020	April 30, 2023
Soma's cake incorporates a light batter with white and brown cream, with a light sweetness despite not containing any sugar or dairy. Also, the addition of coffee crumble further accentuates the natural sweetness of the cake with its bitterness. Impressed with Soma's skill as well as his consideration of their preferences, the judges declare Soma the winner. As Joichiro and Senzaemon observe the match, Joichiro explains that the skills Soma learned in his diner were important since it taught him how to anticipate the needs of his customers. Tsukasa and Asahi are matched together for the second round with the theme being pouissin chicken. Before starting, Asahi makes a bet with Tsukasa to take his signature grater if he wins. During the match, it is revealed Asahi had stolen the cooking tools of the other Noirs in order to strengthen his special ability, Cross Knives, which allows him to copy another chef's talents merely by touching their cooking tools. While Tsukasa is able to make an almost perfect dish, it is still outshined by Asahi's dish, as he was able to incorporate the cooking techniques of all of the Noirs. Asahi is declared the winner and takes possession of Tsukasa's grater, gaining his skills. In the next round, Takumi is pitted against Noir chef Don Kama in a team battle. Takumi nominates Isami to be his partner, but Isami apparently arrives at the wrong location.
81	8	"The Missing Half of the Moon"; Transliteration: "Kaketa Hangetsu" (Japanese: 欠けた半月)	Makoto Sokuza	Miyana Okita	August 22, 2020	May 7, 2023
As the match begins, Don Kama boasts to Takumi that he had his men kidnap Isami to prevent him from being able to participate. The match then begins without Isami as both teams are told to create an amuse-bouche dish. Don Kama and his helpers produce a multi-layered verrine set that impresses the judges with how impactful the taste is despite being incredibly light. Don Kama reveals that he used special grooved shakers to create flavored foam that served as the base for the verrines. Megumi then summons Soma, who agrees to take Isami's place as Takumi's partner. Thanks to the many shokugekis they challenges each other to in the past year, both Soma and Takumi become an effective team and create a verrine based on cheese and softshell turtle meat with kaki-no-tane to regulate the taste. The judges are impressed at Takumi and Soma's ability to fuse two opposing tastes and declare them the winners. Kuga and Satoshi rescue Isami and reunite him with Takumi. Defeated, Don Kama gives Asahi his shaker. Afterwards, Soma and his friends find out that Erina was the chef taking on the gauntlet of revenge matches much to their shock. When informed of Erina's success in the revenge matches, the Bookmaster muses that the God Tongue has no place in the tournament.
82	9	"The God Tongue's Despair"; Transliteration: "Kami no Shita no Zetsubō" (Japanese: 神の舌の絶望)	Yoshiyuki Nogami	Iku Suzuki	August 29, 2020	May 14, 2023
Erina easily wins her tournament match against one of the Noirs. Megumi then attends her match against the Noir Huang Zuiwang, with the theme being preparing a dish that can be made in fifteen minutes. It is revealed that Huang's specialty is using his assassin family's knowledge of poisons to create powerful seasonings for food, which are applied through special finger claws. However, Huang is swiftly defeated by Megumi with her Chinese-style lunch platter. With the first round of the tournament complete, Soma and his friends decide to confront the Bookmaster to figure out why Erina is being treated so harshly. As they arrive, they accidentally eavesdrop on a meeting between Erina and the Bookmaster, where it is revealed the Bookmaster is actually Erina's mother, Mana Nakiri. Anne explains Mana left the Nakiri family and abandoned Erina due to her God Tongue causing her be unable to tolerate the taste of food of any kind. In the second round, Takumi is matched against Erina while Megumi faces Asahi. Megumi overhears Asahi taunting Erina that only he can make a dish that can satisfy the God Tongue. Megumi challenges Asahi; if she wins, then Asahi must stop harassing Erina, but if Asahi wins, Megumi must stop being friends with Erina. In the matches, Erina defeats Takumi, and Asahi defeats Megumi. After the match, Asahi again taunts Erina, boasting that only he has the ability to overcome the God Tongue. Soma then intervenes, objecting to Asahi's assertion that his victory is inevitable.
83	10	"Surpassing Dad"; Transliteration: "Oyaji Goe" (Japanese: 親父越え)	Nana Fujiwara	Iku Suzuki, Kouichi Takada	September 5, 2020	May 21, 2023
After Asahi takes his leave, Erina reveals to Soma and Megumi that while the God Tongue is considered a blessing to cooking, it is considered a curse in the Nakiri family as those who possess it will inevitably become too sensitive to the taste of food and become incapable of eating, doomed to a life of suffering. Erina begins to express her doubts about overcoming the curse of the God Tongue, and wonders if Asahi's Crossed Knives really will be the answer. Soma simply assures her that he will defeat Asahi. Soma, Erina, and Asahi advance in the tournament brackets until Soma faces Asahi in the semifinal match. Soma reminisces about how he learned how to cook from his late mother Tamako. Even though she wasn't a good cook, she never gave up even if her dishes turned out poorly. Meanwhile, many of Soma's acquaintances such as Joichiro, Gin, and the Polar Star members arrive to cheer on Soma. As the match starts, Mana decides that the theme should be combining the "Five Grand Cuisines": French, Chinese, Turkish, Indian, and Italian, into a single dish. Asahi immediately starts off using his Crossed Knives, incorporating every cooking tool he has obtained, including Joichiro's knife. While everybody is certain Asahi will win, Soma is not intimidated. By observing how Crossed Knives works, he concludes that it's just a "cheat code" that lets him gain cooking knowledge at a rapid pace, meaning Soma still has an opportunity to surpass him. Soma then prepares to start cooking his own dish.
84	11	"The Taste of Failure"; Transliteration: "Shippai no Aji" (Japanese: 失敗の味)	Ryo Ando	Ryo Ando	September 12, 2020	June 4, 2023
As the match continues, Alice and Hisako bring Azami to the tournament, where he reveals that all of his actions in raising Erina were in an effort to prevent the despair that Mana fell into. Asahi then completes his dish, which is a French basty filled with shark fin soup, Indian spices, and ravioli filled with Turkish dondurma. Asahi's dish impresses the judges and even Mana herself. Soma responds with his own dish, which is fried rice that combines Chinese dongpo pork, Italian acqua pazza, Indian poriyal, French mirepoix, and Turkish pilaf. The judges are shocked at the insane risk Soma took to combine all the various flavors together. Even Mana is shocked by the dish when she realizes Soma used ouef mayonnaise to coat every individual pilaf grain in a thin coat of egg yolk to lock their flavor in. Soma reveals to Asahi that this fried was based on one of his mother's failed dishes that he learned from her, and the one critical element it has that Asahi's dish doesn't is "the taste of failure". Mana is equally impressed with Soma's dish, leaving everybody uncertain on who will be declared the winner.
85	12	"The Perfect Rocks"; Transliteration: "Gokujō no Ishitachi" (Japanese: 極上の石たち)	Ei Tanaka	Ei Tanaka	September 19, 2020	June 11, 2023 (Note: This episode aired at 1:15 a.m. EDT/PDT, 15 minutes after the original air time on Adult Swim.)
To everyone's surprise, Soma's dish causes Mana to unleash an even more powerful pulse that shreds the clothes of almost everyone in the stadium. Asahi cannot believe that Soma could have surpassed his Cross Knives on his own, but the bookmaster herself states that Asahi's dish, while impressive, is nothing more than the flavors he took from other chefs but is empty under the surface. By contrast, Soma's own dish has everything he learned from the people he met, but is also imbued with his own personal flavor, and thus he is declared the absolute winner of the match. Asahi grudgingly accepts his defeat and attempts to return Joichiro's knife to Soma, but Soma says that he won it fairly and can keep it, while also asking why he wanted to marry Erina in the first place. Asahi then recalls the time Joichiro told him the secret to become a great chef, making him realize that what he wanted all along was a family. As he leaves the stadium, he declares to Sarge and his other subordinates that he will leave the Noirs, and they decide to follow him. While everyone is happy for Soma's victory, Erina continues to ignore him. Later that day, Azami and Mana see each other face to face as they recall their first meeting and their life together until Mana broke down upon realizing that Erina would suffer the same fate as her. Suddenly, Joichiro, Sezaemon and Anne enter the room, with Mana explaining that she had her father look into something; namely that there might be a relationship between Asahi and Azami, which she confirmed by tasting the former's dish thanks to her God's Tongue. As the final match approaches, Erina thinks to herself that if Soma was able to defeat Asahi, then that means she'll have to rely on him to satisfy her mother's wishes, recalling that as a child, none of the dishes she made were good enough for Mana's approval. The next day, as the finals begin, Senzaemon recalls how he recruited the current generation of prodigies for Totsuki as part of his plan to save Erina, but as the match goes underway, Erina begins falling into despair. Soma comes and tastes her cooking, telling her she's making a boring dish and he won't feel good to win against her that way, snapping her out of it.
86	13	"Food Wars"; Transliteration: "Shokugeki no Sōma" (Japanese: 食戟のソーマ)	Hikaru Sato, Ei Tanaka	Yoshitomo Yonetani	September 26, 2020	June 18, 2023
Soma sets about making a new version of the egg tempura bowl he first served to Erina during his entrance exam, having incorporated techniques he learned during his time at Totsuki. Both Mana and Erina are caught off guard by how well it is cooked, which causes Erina to release the most powerful version of the Gifting seen yet. However, Erina still refuses to acknowledge the dish as delicious, since she will cook an even better dish. As Mana observes, she realizes that Soma's refusal to quit and his dedication to cook for someone he truly cares about are the elements needed to satisfy the God Tongue. Erina manages to present a dish that defeats Soma's, making her the winner of BLUE. At Soma's 2nd place victory party, the rest of the current and former Elite 10 reveal that they had been quietly dismantling the entire Noir organization while its leadership was distracted at BLUE. Frustrated at having lost to Erina, Soma decides to go on a world tour to improve his cooking. Meanwhile, Erina welcomes Mana home. Azami also returns and admits that Asahi is actually his illegitimate son, making him Erina's half-brother. Erina invites Asahi into the Nakiri family so she can finally fulfill her wish of having the entire family eat a meal together. Six months later, Soma returns to the Yukihira diner, inviting Erina and all of his friends and classmates. Erina arrives first and quietly realizes she has feelings for Soma just as the rest of the guests arrive to celebrate Soma's return.

== Home media release ==
=== Japanese ===
Warner Bros. Japan (Japan – Region 2/A)
Title	Episodes	Release date	Ref.
Box Set	1–13	December 23, 2020	

=== English ===
Sentai Filmworks (North America – Region 1/A)
Title	Episodes	Release date	Ref.
Complete Collection	1–13	April 12, 2022	
