= Food Wars! Shokugeki no Soma season 1 =

2015 Japanese television season

Food Wars! Shokugeki no Soma
- Season 1
- Cover art of the first Blu-ray compilation, featuring main character Soma Yukihira
- No. of episodes: 24

Release
- Original network: TBS, MBS, CBC, BS-TBS, Animax
- Original release: April 4 – September 26, 2015

Season chronology
- Next → The Second Plate

The first season of Food Wars!: Shokugeki no Soma anime television series was produced by J.C.Staff and directed by Yoshitomo Yonetani, the series was first announced in October 2014 by Shueisha. The season adapts the first eight volumes (chapters 1–60) of Yūto Tsukuda and Shun Saeki's manga series of the same name. The series was first broadcast in Japan on TBS from April 3 to September 25, 2015, with additional broadcasts on MBS, CBC, BS-TBS, and Animax. The video streaming service Crunchyroll simulcast the series with English subtitles to the United States, Canada, Australia, New Zealand, South Africa, Latin America, Europe (excluding French speaking territories and Italian speaking territories), the Middle East, and North Africa. Sentai Filmworks licensed the series for digital and home video distribution in North America.

In the United States, Adult Swim's Toonami programming block aired the English dub from July 7, 2019, to January 12, 2020.

== Episodes ==
No. overall	No. in season	Title (Note: English titles are taken from Sentai Filmworks.) (Note: English translated titles are taken from Crunchyroll.)	Directed by	Written by	Original release date	English air date
1	1	"The Vast Wasteland" / "An Endless Wasteland"; Transliteration: "Hatenaki Kōya" (Japanese: 果てなき荒野)	Sega Kajii	Shogo Yasukawa	April 4, 2015	July 7, 2019
Soma Yukihira has been working at his father Joichiro's diner since a young age, establishing an interest in cooking and vowing to beat his father in a cooking battle someday. One day while Joichiro is away, Yaeko Minegasaki, an urban life planner, arrives and threatens to demolish the restaurant. Yaeko orders Soma to make her a tasty meat dish, promising to never disturb him again should the dish satisfy her. Soma uses potatoes and the bacon he bought while shopping to create an imitation roast pork dish. Yaeko enjoys the dish, and fulfills her portion of the deal. Despite the restaurant being saved, Joichiro decides to close it down for three years, opting to travel (and cook) abroad. He sends Soma to take the entrance exam to the prestigious Totsuki Culinary Academy.
2	2	"God Tongue"; Transliteration: "Kami no Shita" (Japanese: 神の舌)	Mitsutoshi Satou	Shogo Yasukawa	April 11, 2015	July 14, 2019
Upon arriving at Totsuki, Soma is shocked by its grandness and how famous it really is. He meets many other chefs, all of whom are descendants of gourmet chefs or heirs to high-class food businesses, who have also come to take the transfer exam. Due to his background as a low-class diner chef, Soma is looked down on. When it comes time for the examination, most of the participants flee upon hearing that Erina Nakiri, a legendary food genius with the most selective palate known to mankind (nicknamed 'The God Tongue') will be their examiner. For fun, Erina changes the exam order to cook an egg dish to satisfy her which scare all other away with Soma only remaining took her challenge. He creates an ordinary-looking rice with seasoning, only to reveal that the seasoning contains chicken aspic, which enhances the flavor greatly. Despite being overwhelmingly impressed with his dish, Erina fails him, disliking his nonchalant and perceived cocky attitude, and feeling that her pride would be threatened if she passed him. Later in the day, her grandfather Senzaemon, the director of the school, tastes Soma's dish and overrules Erina's decision.
3	3	"That Chef Doesn't Smile" / "That Chef Never Smiles"; Transliteration: "Kono Ryōrinin wa Warawanai" (Japanese: この料理人は笑わない)	Toshiki Fukushima	Shogo Yasukawa	April 18, 2015	July 21, 2019
At the entrance ceremony, Soma is introduced as the only student who managed to transfer into Totsuki's high school division. He declares that he will become the top student at Totsuki, instantly earning the ire of the entire student body. Soma meet Erina again with Erina confuse how Soma was here despite rejecting him deciding that Soma is only here as mistake believe he couldn't match up the student in Totsuki but Soma unphase by the intimidation having twelve years experience in the kitchen declaring that he will cook a dish making her say delicious and take the top. In his first class, he is paired with the meek Megumi Tadokoro, who has the worst grades among the first-years and is one E grade away from expulsion. The class consists of making Beef Bourguignon for the notoriously strict French teacher Roland Chapelle, also known as "The Chef that Never Smiles." Megumi is determined to earn a passing grade, but encounters a setback when two other students sabotage the dish by adding too much salt. Luckily, Soma is able to make the dish again, using honey to quickly tenderize the meat. The class is astonished when Chapelle smiles once he tries Soma and Megumi's dish, and proclaims that he wishes he could give them a grade higher than an A. The two saboteurs, distracted by Chapelle's smiling, accidentally ruin their own dish, and receive a failing grade. Meanwhile, Erina is told of Soma's success in Chapelle's class and furiously vows to get him expelled.
4	4	"Sacred Mother of Kyokusei" / "The Madonna of the Polar Star"; Transliteration: "Kyokusei no Maria" (Japanese: 極星の聖母 (マリア))	Kazuya Miura	Shogo Yasukawa	April 25, 2015	July 28, 2019
Soma is sent to Polar Star Dormitory, a dorm for students whose home is far away from the school. He is greeted by Fumio Daimidō, the caretaker, and instructed to cook a dish that satisfies her to become a resident. Soma creates a mackerel burger meal using leftover ingredients in the kitchen, impressing Fumio. Soma meets the other first-year residents in his welcoming party: Yūki Yoshino, who specializes in wild game; Ryōko Sakaki, who specializes in fermentation and alcoholic beverages; Shun Ibusaki, who specializes in smoked food; Zenji Marui, who specializes in food research; and Daigo Aoki and Shōji Satō, neither of whom specialize in any one area of cooking. He also discovers that Megumi specializes in vegetable and seafood dishes and meets Satoshi Isshiki, the only second-year, who specializes in traditional Japanese cuisine. During the party, Soma learns about the Elite Ten, the highest decision-making body in the school other than the school director. This group consists of ten exceptionally talented students. The tenth seat is Erina and the seventh seat is Satoshi. Satoshi decides to challenge Soma to a cookoff. When Satoshi presents his peppered mackerel dish, Soma is shocked by the high quality of his cooking.
5	5	"The Ice Queen and the Spring Storm"; Transliteration: "Kōri no Joō to Haru no Arashi" (Japanese: 氷の女王と春の嵐)	Ryo Ando	Shogo Yasukawa	May 2, 2015	August 4, 2019
Soma presents his dish, mackerel onigiri chazuke. Everybody is impressed, and the cookoff is declared a draw. Wanting to be a member of the Elite Ten, Soma challenges Satoshi for his seat but finds that it can only be obtained through a high-stakes cooking duel called a Shokugeki, and Soma has nothing to wager that is of equivalent value to a seat in the Elite Ten. Meanwhile, Erina challenges the Chanko Research Society president Kiyoshi Godabayashi to a Shokugeki for the rights to his clubroom, which she wins with ease. She then has the clubroom demolished to make room for a new wing for her personal cooking facilities.
6	6	"The Meat Aggressor" / "The Meat Invader"; Transliteration: "Niku no Shinryakusha" (Japanese: 肉の侵略者)	Kenichiro Komaya	Shinichi Inozume	May 9, 2015	August 11, 2019
After a morning working in the Polar Star Dormitory's farm, Megumi helps Soma look for a research society, the equivalent of a high school club, to join. They stumble upon the Don Research Society, which is being targeted by Erina for her expansion project. Ikumi Mito, one of Erina's lackeys known as "The Meat Master", challenges club president Kanichi Konishi, telling him no matter his dish, it will never beat her A5 grade meat. Soma volunteers to compete in Kanichi's place, with the challenge being to cook a donburi dish with meat as the main ingredient. If Soma wins, the club stays with increased funding and Ikumi must join it, but if Ikumi wins, the club disbands and Soma will be expelled. In preparing for the Shokugeki, Soma makes numerous donburi dishes through research and modifies them. Soma settles on making Chaliapin steak, while Ikumi, heir to a massive meat packaging business, contacts her family to deliver the best cut of A5 grade beef available.
7	7	"The Silent Bowl, the Eloquent Bowl" / "A Quiet Don, an Eloquent Don"; Transliteration: "Shizukanaru Don, Yūben'na Don" (Japanese: 静かなる丼、雄弁な丼)	Sega Kajii	Shinichi Inozume	May 16, 2015	August 18, 2019
At the Shokugeki, Ikumi wows the audience with her A5 grade beef, while Soma is mocked for using discount supermarket beef. Ikumi completes her A5 Japanese Beef Roti Don first, and the judges are extremely impressed with the taste and quality of the meat. Soma then presents his Chaliapin Steak Don, which the judges initially refuse to taste. Once they do, they are unable to stop eating, resulting in a unanimous win for Soma. Soma points out that Ikumi misunderstood the concept of donburi by placing too much emphasis on the beef and not on the dish as a whole, as the judges were too full from eating the beef to finish her rich garlic rice. With Soma's victory, Ikumi has her personal kitchen taken away from her by Erina. Ikumi develops a crush on Soma when he considers the nickname Nikumi to be cute and runs off. She joins Don RS and is immediately outraged and embarrassed to learn Soma did not join the club with her, as he had only visited Don RS to research donburi recipes to add to his restaurant's menu.
8	8	"A Concerto of Concept and Creation" / "The Concerto of Inspiration and Imagination"; Transliteration: "Hassō to Sōzō no Kyōsōkyoku" (Japanese: 発想と創造の協奏曲)	Hiroyuki Okuno	Shun Kawanabe	May 23, 2015	August 25, 2019
The first year students at Totsuki Academy go to a training camp as their first major challenge, during which about half of the first year students usually receive a failing grade and are expelled. The students are given various challenges by alumni from the school, who are brought in to serve as judges. The first challenge for Soma's group, which includes Megumi and the Aldini twins Takumi and Isami, is to make a dish that can be served at a Japanese restaurant using ingredients gathered from the area surrounding the kitchen. They are judged by former 2nd seat Hinako Inui. Takumi, heir to his family restaurant in Tuscany, "Trattoria Aldini", challenges Soma to a duel to see who can cook the better dish, as they both specialize in diner-style dishes. While most of the students gather fish, the Aldini twins find a duck and are the first to complete a dish and pass the challenge.
9	9	"The Breading That Showcases the Mountains" / "The Breading to Adorn the Mountains"; Transliteration: "Yama o Irodoru Koromo" (Japanese: 山を彩る衣)	Mitsutoshi Satou	Shun Kawanabe	May 30, 2015	September 1, 2019
Soma takes Inui's kaki peanuts on the understanding that any ingredient found in the area can be used. He and Megumi gather ingredients and make the Char Okakiage dish with their remaining 15 minutes, using the peanuts as a crust for the fish. Inui expresses her satisfaction and passes Soma and Megumi, but she does not declare a winner between Takumi and Soma. Takumi vowes to challenge Soma to a Shokugeki should they meet again. The students return to the hotel where they are ordered to each cook 50 servings of a steak dinner to serve to the Bodybuilding, Football and Wrestling Clubs, with the risk of immediate expulsion unless all servings are cooked within 1 hour. Soma finishes quickly and heads to the public bath where he runs into Erina, who has just finished her own bath.
10	10	"The Supreme Recette" / "The Heavenly Recette"; Transliteration: "Shijō no Rusetto" (Japanese: 至上のルセット)	Yasushi Murayama	Shun Kawanabe	June 6, 2015	September 8, 2019
Soma apologizes for knocking Erina over, but Erina refuses his help. In the bath, Soma meets alumnus and Totsuki Resort head chef Gin Dojima, who is surprised that Soma has finished the challenge so quickly. Dojima wishes Soma good luck as Takumi Aldini enters the bath, and Takumi is shocked to see Soma having casual conversation with a legend like Dojima. The next day, Soma and Megumi are assigned the task of making the Nine Vegetable Terrine by alumnus Kojiro Shinomiya. This time, they must cook individually instead of as partners. In the rush to claim the best ingredients, Megumi is pushed aside and is only able to obtain a bruised head of cauliflower. Thinking about what Soma would do, Megumi uses wine vinegar to preserve the color and enhance the sweetness of the cauliflower. Shinomiya passes Soma, but fails Megumi for making unauthorized changes to the recipe. Soma defends Megumi, angering Shinomiya, who reveals that he intentionally provided a limited number of good cauliflower heads to limit the number of students who could pass. A furious Soma challenges Shinomiya to a Shokugeki to get Megumi's expulsion rescinded.
11	11	"The Magician from the East"; Transliteration: "Higashi kara Kita Majutsushi" (Japanese: 東から来た魔術師)	Ryo Ando	Shogo Yasukawa	June 13, 2015	September 15, 2019
Shinomiya initially refuses Soma's challenge, however, Dojima and Inui overhear and pressure him into accepting. Thus, Soma and Megumi battle Shinomiya in an unofficial Shokugeki under the condition that Megumi is the lead chef and Soma is her sous-chef. While Shinomiya makes his dish, Megumi starts to panic. Soma tells her to relax and focus on making a dish representative of herself. Shinomiya presents his dish first, the Chou farci, and the judges give overwhelming praise to the dish. However Dojima is not satisfied by the dish, as it is not one of Shinomiya's specialties while Shinomiya states he doesn't need use his specialty against a student. Megumi then presents her dish, the Rainbow Terrine.
12	12	"The Memory of a Single Dish" / "The Memory of a Dish"; Transliteration: "Hito-sara no Kioku" (Japanese: ひと皿の記憶)	Hiroyuki Okuno	Shogo Yasukawa	June 20, 2015	September 22, 2019
Megumi manages to impress the judges with her Rainbow Terrine, which emphasises the maturity of vegetables. However, all three judges vote for Shinomiya's dish as it is more superior. Just then, Dojima gives his own vote towards Megumi's dish. Dojima says that Shinomiya has allowed his cooking to become stagnant, and that his status as a world famous chef has prevented him from developing his skills further. Shinomiya's climb to fame is revealed to have involved ensuring his dishes were made exactly to his recipe, with no tolerance for changes due to experience mishap when chef under him who were jeleous sabotage his dish when they change recipe causing him harden himself and fire the chefs for sabotage his dish and manage reach his goal winning the Pluspol reward but couldn't progress any further. Dojima then have Shinomiya tries Megumi's dish for himself, although criticize some flaw of the dish but it then end soothing his heart and came to understands how her dish was geared towards the needs of those eating it, and puts in his own vote for Megumi. With Inui also casting a vote for Megumi, the Shokugeki ends in a tie, and Shinomiya revokes Megumi's expulsion. As Megumi returns to her concerned friends, Soma laments what is, in his eyes, a defeat.
13	13	"Eggs Before the Dawn"; Transliteration: "Yoake Mae no Tamago-tachi" (Japanese: 夜明け前の卵たち)	Sega Kajii	Shinichi Inozume	June 27, 2015	October 6, 2019
Before the students have a chance to sleep for the night, Dojima announces the next task, in which the students must prepare a buffet-style egg dish to be served at breakfast the next morning. As everyone spends the night trying to come up with a recipe, Soma decides on a soufflé omelette, which is met with silent criticism from some of the other students. The next day, it is revealed the judges are the hotel's guests and staff, and students must hand out 200 servings of their dish to pass. While many students including Erina, Megumi, and Takumi manage to impress with their dishes, Soma struggles to serve his dish to anyone.
14	14	"Metamorphose" / "Metamorphosis"; Transliteration: "Metamorufōze" (Japanese: メタモルフォーゼ)	Hikaru Sato	Shinichi Inozume	July 4, 2015	October 13, 2019
Due to the specific timing required for his soufflé omelette, Soma struggles to get any customers to try his dish before they end up deflating. With half an hour left, Soma changes his approach, cooking in front of his customers to attract a crowd while delivering the dish in its peak condition. Optimizing his preparation time to cook his omelettes as quickly as possible, Soma manages to complete his 200 servings with mere seconds to spare. Afterwards, Soma is introduced to Erina's cousin, Alice Nakiri, who considers both Soma and Erina her rivals. After another task a few hours later, Dojima treats all the surviving students to a banquet to celebrate the end of the training camp.
15	15	"The Man Called 'Carnage'" / "The Man Called Demon"; Transliteration: "Syura to Yobareda Otoko" (Japanese: 『修羅』と呼ばれた男)	Makoto Noriza	Shun Kawanabe	July 18, 2015	October 20, 2019
As the students make their way back to Totsuki, Soma ends up missing his bus and hitches a ride back to school with Erina, who explains the next event, the Autumn Festival. Returning to the Polar Star Dormitory, Soma is surprised to see his father, Joichiro, and finds that he is an alumnus and former member of the Elite Ten who went by the name Joichirou Saiba. As Joichiro treats the residents to a meal, Fumio explains that Joichiro and Dojima were once fellow Polar Star residents who were responsible for many of the luxuries the dorm has. It is also revealed that Erina has fond memories of Joichiro as well. The next morning, Joichiro challenges Soma to a cooking battle.
16	16	"The Cook Who Traveled Thousands of Miles" / "The Chef Who's Crossed a Thousand Leagues"; Transliteration: "Banri o Kakeru Ryōrinin" (Japanese: 万里を駆ける料理人)	Takashi Yamazaki	Shun Kawanabe	July 25, 2015	October 27, 2019
With Fumio, Megumi, and Satoshi as judges, Soma and Joichiro are challenged to use ingredients from the kitchen to make a light yet energizing breakfast dish. Soma presents an apple risotto, which provides a crisp taste that changes with the addition of black pepper. Joichiro presents an unusual ramen that, despite its heavy appearance, turns out to be a mellow and warming vegetarian dish, providing powerful flavor without meat or fish. The judges unanimously vote Joichiro's dish the winner, though Soma's dish also receives praise. As Joichirou takes leaves, he recommends that Soma visit Yukihira Diner during the holiday.
17	17	"Sensual Fried Chicken" / "The Seductive Karaage"; Transliteration: "Kannō no Karaage" (Japanese: 官能の唐揚げ)	Junto Sasaki	Shogo Yasukawa	August 1, 2015	November 3, 2019
Returning home, Soma temporarily re-opens Yukihira Diner to serve his loyal customers, including his childhood friend, Mayu Kurase, who has a crush on him. He learns that the Sumire Shopping District has been doing poorly lately due to the arrival of a popular karaage chain shop, Mozuya. Wanting to help revive the shopping district, Soma decides to come up with a competing karaage recipe, calling in Ikumi as his meat expert while Mayu winds up as his taste tester. The three do some recon at Mozuya, where they meet its CEO Kinu Nakamozu, before they begin working on a karaage recipe of their own. As Soma takes Mayu's suggestion to use their shopping district location to their advantage, it is revealed that the figure behind Mozuya's success is one of the Elite Ten.
18	18	"The Fried Chicken of Youth" / "The Karaage of Youth"; Transliteration: "Seishun no Karaage" (Japanese: 青春の唐揚げ)	Hiroyuki Okuno	Shogo Yasukawa	August 8, 2015	November 10, 2019
Noting that the shopping district focuses more on walk-and-eat food, as opposed to Mozuya's packaged approach, Soma shifts his focus towards creating a karaage that can be enjoyed straight out of the fryer. Opting to go with chicken thigh meat with a chilli-based marinade, Soma is inspired by a bento shop owner to serve his karaage in rice flour wraps with salad, providing enhanced flavor, portability, and appeal. This brings a large amount of business, which helps the rest of the shopping district come back to life. Afterwards, Soma puts Mayu in charge of helping with the karaage's sales, having noticed her good qualities. Returning to the academy, Soma is brought before the person behind Mozuya's success, Etsuya Eizan, the 9th seat of the Elite Ten. Eizan informs Soma that he has been chosen for the Autumn Elections.
19	19	"The Chosen One"; Transliteration: "Erabareshi Mono" (Japanese: 選ばれし者)	Sega Kajii	Shinichi Inozume	August 15, 2015	November 17, 2019
The contestants and rules for the Autumn Elections are announced: sixty selected contestants are split into two groups which they must top to advance to the tournament phase. Megumi is approached by Miyoko Hojo, who is interested in her Shokugeki with Shinomiya, but is disappointed when she hears Megumi was helped by Soma. After learning the first dish of the elections is curry, Soma and Megumi visit to Jun Shiomi, an instructor and Polar Star alumna who specializes in curry and spices. Using Jun's theories on spices, her assistant Akira Hayama, who is also in the elections, demonstrates that preparing the same ingredients of a curry dish in different ways can yield drastically different results. Impressed by the powerful flavors of Akira's curry, Soma becomes determined to beat him in the preliminaries.
20	20	"Dragon Lies Prone then Ascends to the Sky" / "The Dragon Lies Down and Ascends the Skies"; Transliteration: "Ryū wa Fushi, Sora e Noboru" (Japanese: 龍は臥し、空へ昇る)	Makoto Noriza	Shogo Yasukawa	August 22, 2015	November 24, 2019
Having received the challenge of creating a curry dish, many of the contestants set off to visit their families and study up on spices during the remainder of the summer. Soma stays at the dorms to try out various spice combinations. The Autumn Election preliminaries soon arrive, and the contestants find that only the top four from each group will make it to the tournament phase. As the contestants begin cooking, Soma appears to have fallen asleep.
21	21	"That Which Is Known Yet Unknown" / "The Unknown Known"; Transliteration: "Michinaru Kichi" (Japanese: 未知なる既知)	Takashi Yamazaki	Shun Kawanabe	August 29, 2015	December 8, 2019
Soma awakens from his nap when he senses that his spice and vegetable infused rice is cooked to perfection. Meanwhile, Megumi brings out a monkfish for her dish. With the cooking period over, the evaluation begins with a harsh panel of judges giving most contestants low scores. In Group B, Nao Sadatsuka, a creepy girl with an obsession with Erina, presents a pungent laksa dish made with kusaya that has a delicious flavor under its strong odor, and scores 84 points. Then Erina's secretary and childhood friend Hisako Arato, whom Nao has a rivalry with, presents a mutton curry made using medicinal cuisine which undoes the curse-like effects of Nao's curry, scoring 92 points.
22	22	"That Which Transcends the Norm" / "The One Who Surpasses the Ordinary"; Transliteration: "Nichijō o Koerumono" (Japanese: 日常を超えるもの)	Mitsutoshi Satou	Shinichi Inozume	September 5, 2015	December 15, 2019
Miyoko scores 87 points with her pineapple cha-han, and Yuki gets 86 points for her wild game curry. Afterwards, the Aldini brothers face off against each other, with Isami presenting a curry calzone that scores 87 points while Takumi presents a curry pasta dish using tamari soy sauce and cheese filled pasta, and scores 90 points. Alice then presents her deconstructed curry dish that leaves the judges bewildered and amazed, earning 95 points and taking the lead. Finally, Megumi presents her dish, monkfish dobu-jiru, earning her 88 points and landing her a spot in the main tournament alongside Alice, Hisako, and Takumi.
23	23	"The Unfolding Individual Competition" / "The Competition of the Blossoming Individuals"; Transliteration: "Hana Hiraku Ko no Kyōen" (Japanese: 花開く個の競演)	Ryo Ando	Shogo Yasukawa	September 12, 2015	January 5, 2020
Back in Group A, contestants are struggling to score as one of the judges, Natsume Sendawara, keeps giving zero points. This streak of zeros breaks when Ryo Kurokiba, Alice's aide, presents a lobster curry with a cognac base, earning 93 points. Next, Ikumi presents a Dongpo pork curry, using what she learned from her Shokugeki with Soma to impress the judges and earning a score of 86. Afterwards, Ryoko presents a Dal curry made with charcoal-grilled natto and soy sauce rice malt, also scoring 86, and both Marui and Ibusaki earn 88 points with their white potage curry udon and smoked curry, respectively. Then, Akira presents his dish.
24	24	"The Warriors' Banquet" / "The Banquet of Warriors"; Transliteration: "Senshi-tachi no Utage" (Japanese: 戦士たちの宴)	Tani Yoshitomo, Hikaru Sato	Shogo Yasukawa	September 26, 2015	January 12, 2020
Akira's dish, which has a powerful fragrance and uses the power of holy basil and yogurt, earns a score of 94 from the judges. Finally, Soma presents his own dish, combining his past two failures into a fragrant curry risotto omurice containing a mango chutney. The dish earns Soma 93 points, landing him second place behind Akira. However, it is noted that although Akira received a higher score overall, three of the five judges ranked Soma's dish higher than Akira's, with the implication being that in a Shokugeki, this would have given Soma the victory. Later, during the Polar Star dorm afterparty, Soma becomes determined to improve his cooking finesse.

== Home media release ==
=== Japanese ===
Warner Bros. Japan (Japan – Region 2/A)
Volume	Episodes	Release date	Ref.
1	1–3	July 29, 2015	
2	4–6	August 26, 2015	
3	7–9	September 30, 2015	
4	10–12	October 28, 2015	
5	13–15	November 25, 2015	
6	16–18	December 23, 2015	
7	19–21	January 27, 2016	
8	22–24	February 24, 2016	
Box Set 1	1–12	August 24, 2016	
Box Set 2	13–24	September 28, 2016	

=== English ===
Sentai Filmworks (North America – Region 1/A)
Title	Episodes	Release date	Ref.
Complete Collection	1–24	August 15, 2017	
