= Narisawa =

Coordinates: 35°40′17″N 139°43′19″E

NARISAWA
- Interactive map of NARISAWA

Restaurant information
- Established: 2003
- Food type: Japanese
- Location: Minato, Tokyo, Japan

NARISAWA is a Japanese restaurant in Minato, Tokyo, Japan. It opened in Minami Aoyama in November 2003.

== Awards ==
NARISAWA received one Michelin star in the 2008 Michelin Guide Tokyo, and then two stars in 2010. In 2008 the restaurant was ranked 20th among The World's 50 Best Restaurants, and the best restaurant in Asia. Most recently, the restaurant was named 8th in 2016.

== Chef ==
Chef Yoshihiro Narisawa was born on 11 April 1969 in Aichi Prefecture, Japan. He trained in Switzerland under Frédy Girardet, in France under Joël Robuchon, and in Italy at Antica Osteria del Ponte.

Narisawa returned from Europe after 9 years and opened his own first restaurant in Odawara, Kanagawa, and named it "La Napoule". He subsequently moved the entire operation to central Tokyo.
