= Food Wars! Shokugeki no Soma season 2 =

2016 Japanese television season

Food Wars! Shokugeki no Soma: The Second Plate
- Season 2
- Cover art of the first Blu-ray compilation, featuring Soma Yukihira (foreground) and Megumi Tadokoro (background)
- No. of episodes: 13

Release
- Original network: MBS, Tokyo MX, BS11, Animax
- Original release: July 2 – September 24, 2016

Season chronology
- ← Previous; Season 1 Next → The Third Plate

The second season of Food Wars!: Shokugeki no Soma anime television series, subtitled The Second Plate (弍ノ皿, Ni no Sara), was produced by J.C.Staff under the direction Yoshitomo Yonetani. The story continues Soma Yukihira's journey at the prestigious Totsuki Culinary Academy as he and his classmates compete in the Autumn Elections, followed by their stagiaire (unpaid internships at different restaurants). The series was first broadcast in Japan on MBS from July 2 to September 24, 2016, with additional broadcasts on Tokyo MX, BS11, and Animax.

In the United States, Adult Swim's Toonami programming block aired the English dub from January 19 to April 19, 2020.

== Episodes ==
No. overall	No. in season	Title (Note: English titles are taken from Sentai Filmworks.) (Note: English translated titles are taken from Crunchyroll.)	Directed by	Written by	Original release date	English air date
25	1	"That Which is Placed Within the Box" / "What Fills the Box"; Transliteration: "Sono Hako ni Tsumeru mono" (Japanese: その箱に詰めるもの)	Hikaru Sato	Shogo Yasukawa	July 2, 2016	January 19, 2020
The main tournament of the Autumn Elections starts with Soma and Alice, who are making bentos. Using her array of scientific techniques and state-of-the-art equipment, Alice presents a temari sushi bento that uses flavors from each piece to complement the flavor of the next. Meanwhile, Soma presents his own take on a nori bento, using a molecular gastronomy technique he learned from a cheap candy product to make umami-packed nori spheres. Although Alice consider the importance how it taste Senzaemon point out Bento revolve around surprise and warmth and her dish fail to capture that and majority of judge feeling that the warmth of Soma's dish better suited the theme, the judges declare Soma as the winner.
26	2	"Interplay of Light & Shadow" / "The Interplay of Light and Shadow"; Transliteration: "Kōsakusuru Hikari to Kage" (Japanese: 交錯する光と影)	Kazuhiro Yoneda	Shogo Yasukawa	July 9, 2016	January 26, 2020
Megumi competes against Kurokiba in the second match, where the two make ramen dishes using pre-prepared noodles. As both Megumi and Kurokiba make ramen using seafood based broths, Alice reminisces on when she first met him ten years ago. Kurokiba presents his Soupe de Poisson Ramen first, impressing the judges with a rich flavor made from crushed lobster shells. Despite the shift in the crowd's tone, Megumi concentrates on finishing her Kozuyu Chicken Soy Sauce Ramen, which draws out umami from scallops and simmered dried vegetables while also using a flavor-changing sauce.
27	3	"The Age of Kings" / "The Generation of Prodigies"; Transliteration: ""Gyoku" no Sedai" (Japanese: 『玉』の世代)	Kazuya Miura	Shogo Yasukawa	July 16, 2016	February 2, 2020
Despite a close battle, Kurokiba is declared the winner, though Megumi is still praised for her efforts. The next day, as Hayama and Hisako face off in a hamburger duel, Soma meets the eighth contestant, Subaru Mimasaka, who joins him, Megumi, and Takumi in watching the battle. Hisako presents her dish, a soft-shelled turtle burger, but is defeated by Hayama's kebab burger, which takes advantage of the burger's pickle aspect to enhance the flavor. Hayama criticize Hisako for how small her cooking was and will not lose to someone wishing to become someone's number two with Hisako feeling shame from her loss. Prior to the fourth match, Mimasaka provokes Takumi by insulting his brother, turning their match against each other into a Shokugeki.
28	4	"The Pursuer"; Transliteration: "Tsuiseki-sha" (Japanese: 追跡者)	Sayaka Morikawa	Shogo Yasukawa	July 23, 2016	February 9, 2020
The Shokugeki between Takumi and Mimasaka commences with Takumi's mezzaluna on the line. For the dessert theme, both sides decide to make a semifreddo. Mimasaka's investigative approach to Shokugekis is revealed: he makes his own twists on his opponent's recipes to improve his own dish. At first, Takumi desperately tries to think of twists he can make within the cooking time, but he remembers his training and calms down. After Mimasaka impresses the judges with his dish, Takumi presents his semifreddo with an added layer of lemon curd made with olive oil. However, Mimasaka reveals he had predicted Takumi's actions and added his own secret ingredient, preserved lemons, claiming both victory and Takumi's mezzaluna. Afterwards, Mimasaka shows up at Soma's dorm to challenge him to a Shokugeki in the semi-finals, putting up Takumi's mezzaluna for Soma's knife. However, Soma raises the stakes, putting his career as a chef on the line for all the tools Mimasaka had won in his past 100 Shokugekis as Soma couldn't tolerate how Mimasaka lack any joy in cooking and consider his victories as hollow. He also reveals to Mimasaka that he will be making beef stew for their match.
29	5	"The Secret of the First Bite" / "The Secret in the First Bite"; Transliteration: "Hitokuchime no Himitsu" (Japanese: 一口目の秘密)	Mitsutoshi Satou	Shogo Yasukawa	July 30, 2016	February 16, 2020
Soma is approached by journalist Mitsuru Sotsuda, who asks to write about him as he works on a recipe for his Shokugeki. Agreeing to taste test after Soma allows her to borrow some manga, Erina criticizes Soma's dish harshly, stating that it isn't suited for the match's topic. Thinking Erina's words over, Soma is inspired after receiving some meat from Ikumi. Soma realises that his dish must stand out on the first bite, and decides to make his stew using oxtail. The day of the Shokugeki arrives, and Mimasaka reveals that as a result of his profiling, he has predicted Soma's actions and is also using oxtail, and bringing his own twist to it.
30	6	"Morning Shall Come Again" / "Dawn Will Come Again"; Transliteration: "Asa wa Mata Kuru" (Japanese: 朝はまた来る)	Hiroyuki Okuno	Shogo Yasukawa	August 6, 2016	February 23, 2020
Subaru uses smoked bacon as a garniture for his stew, revealing that he got his information from hacking into Mitsuru's notes. Even when Soma reveals his intent to use various cuts of beef to improvise his dish on the fly, Subaru still appears to have predicted Soma's move, remaining confident in his bacon addition. Although the judges are impressed by Subaru's dish, Soma astounds them with his dish, which uses various meats for his garniture. He reveals that the dish is created from everything he had learned so far, and he unanimously wins the match. As a result, Soma manages to return all the tools that Subaru had taken from their original owners. Subaru feeling shame for his loss decide leave Totsuki however Soma stop him since it will defeat the purpose why he accept his challenge in the first place when Soma call Takumi out to take back his mezzaluna, however, decides to leave his mezzaluna with Soma until he can win it back himself he tell Subaru that pay him back for the humiliation that he put him through. Soma then tell Subaru not to plan to take away a chef pride in match ever again and convinced him to continue cooking even he suffer a major defeat.
31	7	"Beasts That Devour Each Other" / "Beasts Devouring Each Other"; Transliteration: "Kuraiau Kemono" (Japanese: 喰らい合う獣)	Hiroshi Kawashima	Shogo Yasukawa	August 13, 2016	March 1, 2020
Kurokiba and Hayama face off against each other in the second semi-final match, in which they must make Western-style dishes. Akira presents his dish, Canard Apicius, using a combination of spices with duck, wowing the judges. Meanwhile, Kurokiba serves up Eel Matelote, adding plums to provide an electrifying taste. The judges cannot decide on a winner, so they declare that the final round will be a three-way match between Soma, Hayama, and Kurokiba, with the theme of pacific saury.
32	8	"The Battle That Follows the Seasons" / "Battle of Seasonality"; Transliteration: "Shun o Meguru Tatakai" (Japanese: 旬を巡る戦い)	Yoshitaka Fujimoto	Shun Kawanabe	August 20, 2016	March 8, 2020
In preparation for the final, Soma and Megumi go to the fish market, where they come across Kurokiba and Alice. There, they learn of the varying factors for picking the best pacific saury, which Kurokiba appears to be an expert on. Learning that Hayama also has a talent for picking out the best fish, Soma worries about how to compete with against them. Soma decides on aging his saury, asking for help from Ryoko, Ibusaki, and Ikumi. He tries their aging techniques: using malt rice, smoking, and high humidity, but manages to think of a way to surpass his competition after a run-in with Fumio. On the day of the final, Soma brings out a completely unrecognizable saury.
33	9	"The Sword That Announces Fall" / "A Sword that Signals Autumn"; Transliteration: "Aki o Tsugeru Katana" (Japanese: 秋を告げる刀)	Chikara Sakurai	Shogo Yasukawa	August 27, 2016	March 15, 2020
The finals begin, and Alice reminisces on the many cooking battles she's had with Kurokiba. After only half the cooking time, Kurokiba presents his dish, a cartoccio cooked with herb butter inside film bags. Next, Akira presents a seared carpaccio, using fire to unleash a powerful aroma from a single spice. Finally, Soma presents his dish, Salted Rice Bran Pacific Saury Rice, inspired by Fumio's pickles. Just as it seems his dish has failed to impress the judges, Soma brings out his dish's true edge.
34	10	"A New Jewel" / "A New Genius"; Transliteration: "Aratanaru "Gyoku"" (Japanese: 新たなる玉)	Hiroyuki Okuno	Shogo Yasukawa	September 3, 2016	March 22, 2020
Soma presents his dish's missing element, a white soup made from soy milk that turns the dish into a creamy porridge, enhancing the already existing flavors. Meanwhile, Satoshi, deducing that Eizan was the one who drove Mimasaka to provoke Soma, tells him that it is Soma's drive to never give up that got him so far. As the judges deliberate, Hayama recalls how Jun brought him out of the slums and helped him become the chef he is. With originality being the deciding factor between the three dishes, Hayama is declared the winner of the Autumn Elections. Afterwards, Soma speaks with Joichiro, stating his determination to continue finding his own way of cooking. A few days later, Soma hangs out with Hayama and Kurokiba while Jun explains the Stagiaire training program for first year students to the three of them.
35	11	"The Stagiaire"; Transliteration: "Sutajiēru" (Japanese: スタジエール)	Mitsutoshi Satou, Tani Yoshitomo	Shun Kawanabe	September 10, 2016	March 29, 2020
The Stagiaire program requires students to take up residence and leave their mark on various restaurants. Soma is paired with Hisako, who has been feeling inferior since she lost the Autumn Elections, and they are sent to Mitamura Western Restaurant. They discover that the restaurant is struggling to keep up with the barrages of orders from commuting customers, but Soma manages to use his experience to take control and keep everyone organised. Meanwhile, Erina and Megumi are sent to a French restaurant, where Erina instantly takes command of the kitchen and Megumi finds her own way to make improvements. While Hisako becomes more accustomed to her role, Soma believes that the restaurant needs to change, so that it doesn't struggle again once the Stagiaire is over. With the staff unwilling to cut down their large menu, Soma suggests that they become a reservations-only restaurant. After passing the first stage of the Stagiare, Soma tells Hisako to stop feeling ashamed of her defeat, telling her that she should aim to stand beside Erina, instead of behind her.
36	12	"The Magician Returns" / "The Magician Once More"; Transliteration: "Majutsu-shi Futatabi" (Japanese: 魔術師再び)	Sayaka Morikawa	Shogo Yasukawa	September 17, 2016	April 5, 2020
The next step of the Stagiaire reunites Soma with Shinomiya, who is opening a Tokyo branch of his French restaurant, Shino's. As the restaurant begins its first pre-open day, Soma witnesses firsthand the intensity of working in Shinomiya's kitchen and struggles to keep up with the rest of the staff. Thinking over his failures, Soma spends the rest of the week getting prep work done early so he can ask the other staff members for advice on how to become more efficient in the kitchen and learn new techniques. On the final day, Soma decides to enter a competition to create a dish for Shino's menu that he can call his specialty.
37	13	"Pomp & Circumstance" / "Pomp and Circumstance"; Transliteration: "Ifudōdō" (Japanese: 威風堂々)	Hiroyuki Okuno, Hikaru Sato	Shogo Yasukawa	September 24, 2016	April 19, 2020
At the end of the pre-open's final day, Shinomiya calls in and serves food to his fellow alumni and his mother, recalling what inspired him to pursue French cuisine. During the competition, Soma uses everything he's learned to put together a French take on a chicken and egg rice bowl using a quail stuffed with risotto. Despite deciding that the dish is not good enough as it is, Shinomiya helps Soma refine the recipe so that it can become a dish on the menu. Soma passes the Stagiaire and returns to Totsuki, ready to take on anyone who challenges him to a Shokugeki.

== Home media release ==
=== Japanese ===
Warner Bros. Japan (Japan – Region 2/A)
Volume	Episodes	Release date	Ref.
1	1–2	September 28, 2016	
2	3–4	October 26, 2016	
3	5–6	November 23, 2016	
4	7–8	December 21, 2016	
5	9–10	January 25, 2017	
6	11–12	February 22, 2017	
7	13	March 29, 2017	
Box Set	1–13	November 23, 2016	

=== English ===
Sentai Filmworks (North America – Region 1/A)
Title	Episodes	Release date	Ref.
Complete Collection	25–37	February 13, 2018	
