= Andrew Knowlton =

American food writer

- Born: Gainesville, Florida
- Education: New York University
- Employer: Bon Appétit
- Spouse: Christina Skogly Knowlton
- Children: 2

Andrew Knowlton is an American journalist who served as the restaurant editor at Bon Appétit magazine, where he worked for 18 years, starting in 2000. He has also been the host of several cooking competition shows, including The Final Table.

== Early life and education ==
Knowlton was born in Gainesville, Florida and raised in Atlanta, Georgia. Knowlton attended Bates College and New York University.

== Career ==
Prior to working at Bon Appétit, Knowlton worked for Lingua Franca magazine, as well as in the restaurant industry. Knowlton started working at Bon Appétit in 2000. He was in charge of Bon Appétit's blog presence and the editor of the restaurant section of the magazine, as well as compiling the magazines Hot 10 Best New Restaurants list.

After appearing as a judge on Iron Chef America, in the fall of 2007, he appeared on the Food Network's The Next Iron Chef, acting as a judge for the entire series.

In 2018, he appeared as the host for the Netflix cooking show The Final Table.

In February 2021, in the fall out of racism allegations at Bon Appétit, the podcast Reply All and Business Insider described accounts from former employees of what was described as verbal harassment and casual racism from Knowlton while working at Bon Appétit.

== Personal life ==
Knowlton is married to Christina Skogly Knowlton and lives in Austin, Texas. He and his wife have two daughters.

== Television appearances ==
- Iron Chef America (guest judge)
  - Episode IA0409, Batali/Abou-Ganim vs. Gadsby/Albert, Battle Mango
  - Episode IA0502, Flay vs. Ford, Battle Blue foot chicken
  - Episode IA0828, Flay v. Greenspan, Battle Goose
  - Episode IASP13H, Flay v. Morimoto, Battle Egg nog/Ice sculpture
- The Next Iron Chef (judge)
- Gordon Ramsay's Hell's Kitchen (guest judge)
- The Final Table (host)
