= Yoshihiro Narisawa =

Japanese chef

- 成澤 由浩
- Born: April 11, 1969 (age 56)
- Occupation: Chef

Yoshihiro Narisawa (成澤 由浩, Narisawa Yoshihiro; born 11 April 1969) is a Japanese chef and owner of the two-Michelin star restaurant Narisawa in Minato, Tokyo, Japan.

== Career ==
Narisawa was born in Aichi prefecture in 1969 to a baker and western sweets maker. He travelled to Europe at the age of 19, and trained in France, Switzerland, and Italy, before returning to Japan in 1996.

In 1996, Narisawa opened a restaurant in Odawara, Kanagawa. In 2003, Narisawa moved to Tokyo and opened the restaurant "Les Créations de Narisawa" in Aoyama, renaming it Narisawa in 2011. Restaurant Narisawa was ranked #20 on The World's 50 Best Restaurants list in 2009, and has consistently ranked in the top 30 since. Its current ranking in 2017 is #18. He has built his fame on promoting organic and natural ingredients as a part of Japanese cuisine, saying, “Most of the vegetables and fruit in Japan contain pesticides. It’s the role of the chef to support (organic) producers.” Accordingly, Restaurant Narisawa received the inaugural Sustainable Restaurant Award from Restaurant Magazine, after an audit by the Sustainable Restaurant Association.

In 2018, Narisawa appeared as a guest judge on the "Japan" episode of The Final Table, season 1.
