= Food Wars! Shokugeki no Soma season 3 =

2017-18 Japanese television season

Food Wars! Shokugeki no Soma: The Third Plate
- Season 3
- Back cover art of the first Blu-ray compilation, featuring Soma Yukihira (left) and Erina Nakiri (right)
- No. of episodes: 24

Release
- Original network: Tokyo MX, BS11, Animax
- Original release: October 4, 2017 – June 25, 2018

Season chronology
- ← Previous; The Second Plate Next → The Fourth Plate

The third season of Food Wars!: Shokugeki no Soma anime television series, subtitled The Third Plate (餐ノ皿, San no Sara), was produced by J.C.Staff and directed by Yoshitomo Yonetani. The series was first broadcast in Japan on Tokyo MX. It aired from October 4, 2017, to June 25, 2018, with additional broadcasts on BS11 and Animax. In addition, AbemaTV streamed the season. The third season is broken into two parts. The first covers the Moon Festival when Soma Yukihira challenges Council of Ten Masters member Terunori Kuga to a challenge to see who can raise the most money during the five-day event.

At the end of the event, Erina Nakiri's father, Azami Nakiri, appears and takes over the school. He institutes a series of reforms, including the establishment of a new ruling body called the Central Gourmet Institute, and the elimination of all independent groups within Totsuki, including Polaris Dorm. The second part continues with the promotional exams where everyone is guaranteed to pass if they stick to the curriculum and follow Central's orders. However, Soma's group is targeted for expulsion because of their successful defense of Polaris Dorm and a few other independent groups. At the end of the second part, Soma's group of rebels challenges Azami's group to a Shokugeki, attempting to overthrow Azami.

In the United States, Adult Swim's Toonami programming block aired the English dub from February 28 to August 1, 2021.

== Episodes ==
No. overall	No. in season	Title (Note: English titles are taken from Sentai Filmworks.) (Note: English translated titles are taken from Crunchyroll.)	Directed by	Written by	Original release date	English air date
Part 1
38	1	"Challenging the Ten" / "Challenging the Elite Ten"; Transliteration: "Jukketsu ni Idomu" (Japanese: 十傑に挑む)	Mitsutoshi Satou	Shogo Yasukawa	October 4, 2017	February 28, 2021
In response to Elite Ten 8th seat Kuga's provocation at the Autumn Leaves Viewing, Soma decides to show off his cooking prowess in the upcoming Moon Festival, where groups or individuals set up food booths on school grounds. Deciding to go up against Kuga directly, Soma approaches Miyoko Hojo, who specialises in Chinese cuisine like Kuga. Miyoko explains that Kuga's focus is on Sichuan spicy cuisine, and takes Soma to Kuga's Chinese Cuisine Research Society. Soma is shocked to see many chefs working in perfect unison, all trained by Kuga himself. After tasting ten identical dishes of mapo tofu, Soma becomes more determined to beat Kuga. He claims the booth area directly in front of Kuga's, and decides to serve Chinese cuisine as well. As Soma submits his application form, Erina tells him that he will be expelled if his booth loses money.
39	2	"Má & Là" / "Má and Là"; Transliteration: "Mā to Rā" (Japanese: 『麻』と『辣』)	Takeshi Nishino	Shogo Yasukawa	October 11, 2017	March 7, 2021
Hearing of Soma's declaration of war on Kuga, Alice decides to join the festival. She capitalizes on Jun's maternal instinct to include her and Ryo in the booth run by the Shiomi Seminar, much to the annoyance of Hayama. After involuntarily tasting Soma's version of mapo tofu, Erina superciliously explains to him the concept of `Má' (麻, lit. hot) and `là (辣, lit. spiciness) in Sichuan cuisine, unintentionally giving Soma useful information. Alice and Hisako explain that spiciness works on vanilloids receptors differently, triggering the sense of pain, which has addictive and medicinal effects. Back at the dorm, Soma starts experimenting, but just ends up making overly spicy dishes. Soma and Megumi borrow the Chinese Department's open-clay-pot-oven, and plan to make Hujiao bing.
40	3	"The Lunar Feast" / "Moon Festival"; Transliteration: "Gekkyōsai" (Japanese: 月饗祭)	Makoto Noriza	Shogo Yasukawa	October 18, 2017	March 14, 2021
When the Moon Festival begins, Kuga's restaurant immediately gets a long line of customers, while Soma manages to impress the few he is getting. The booths run by Isshiki and the Polar Star Dormitory, the Don RS and Ikumi, and the Aldini brothers all seem to be doing well. By the end of the day, Kuga's restaurant is first place in sales in the Central area, and the only two booths that lost money were Soma's and the Shiomi Seminar's, leaving Erina appalled. Day 2 passes and Kuga's restaurant takes first place again, while Soma manages to climb up five rungs from last place with the introduction of a noodle dish created by slicing up the dough for the Hujiao bing into noodles and pairing them with garlic, shrimp stock, and ground pork filling. Meanwhile, Alice decides to start over and cooperate with Hayama to make a dish that will satisfy customers.
41	4	"A Pride of Young Lions"; Transliteration: "Wakaki Shishi-tachi no Mure" (Japanese: 若き獅子たちの群れ)	Kazuya Miura	Shogo Yasukawa	October 25, 2017	March 21, 2021
Day 3 passes without much improvement. Soma notices that though Kuga is getting steady business, the long wait time and the need for quick eating at peak times frustrates the diners. On Day 4, Soma adds tables and chairs to his booth, and a remade version of his Yukihira-style mapo tofu by adding noodles and a giant mystery meatball with curry in it. Its aroma and intriguing appearance appeal to Kuga's frustrated customers, and they begin to defect to Soma's booth. Just as customer numbers begin to get out of hand, Mimasaka comes to help. As evening falls, Soma and Megumi's friends from other booths and members of Megumi's Regional Cuisine RS arrive to help cook and draw in more customers. Together, they achieve first place in sales on Day 4, beating Kuga's restaurant. The Shiomi Seminar booth also manages to attract customers and make up for their losses.
42	5	"The Shadow over the Dining Table" / "The Darkening Dinner Table"; Transliteration: "Kageriyuku Shokutaku" (Japanese: 翳りゆく食卓)	Hiroyuki Okuno	Shogo Yasukawa	November 1, 2017	March 28, 2021
Kuga beats Soma again on the 5th and last day of the Moon Festival, but he is unsatisfied. A flashback reveals that Kuga had also challenged the Elite Ten as a first-year and that Tsukasa Eishi, the current 1st seat, accepted his challenge. When Kuga lost, he made a deal with Tsukasa: if Kuga is first place in sales in the Central area every day of the Moon Festival, they would have a rematch. Unfortunately, both Kuga and Soma lost, as Soma also didn't achieve his goal of beating Kuga in total sales. 2nd seat Rindou Kobayashi invites Soma and Megumi to Tsukasa's booth, where all three of them enjoy a nine-course meal prepared by Tsukasa. Intrigued by the different level of dining that the uptown area offers, Soma visits Erina's booth only to find her trembling in fear and her diners shocked by the unexpected appearance of her father, Azami Nakiri. Azami mocks the gourmands that have come to taste Erina's food, and declares himself the new headmaster of Totsuki, as he has the support of six members of the Elite Ten.
43	6	"The Captive Queen" / "The Imprisoned Queen"; Transliteration: "Toraware no Joō" (Japanese: 囚われの女王)	Makoto Noriza	Shogo Yasukawa	November 8, 2017	April 4, 2021
Dojima and Joichiro meet coincidentally after many years. In the midst of their reunion, they are informed of Azami's takeover, and Azami is revealed to have been the 3rd Seat behind Joichiro and Dojima. The news of the takeover shocks the students and the public. Azami dismisses Hisako from her post as Erina's secretary, with Erina unable to object. Senzaemon meets with Soma, and Senzaemon reflects on Erina's childhood, and how she was brainwashed, abused, and isolated by Azami to polish her "God Tongue" into what it is today. This left her traumatized by his presence. Azami was exiled, but continued to gather support in other parts of the world. Although Soma seems unsympathetic about Erina's situation, he reiterates to Senzaemon his vow from when he first met Erina: to make her say his food is delicious. As Erina begins to despair in her room, Alice, Ryo and Hisako arrive to break her out of the Nakiri estate, and find refuge for her at Polar Star Dormitory. Upon learning about her past, the residents accept Erina as part of the dorm.
44	7	"The Academy Falls" / "It Begins"; Transliteration: "Hibuta wa Kirareta" (Japanese: 火蓋は切られた)	Sega Kajii	Shinichi Inozume	November 15, 2017	April 11, 2021
Azami announces the disbandment of all research societies and independent bodies in Totsuki, to the horror of the student body and staff. He also announces the formation of the Central Gourmet Society, Central for short, a new authoritarian body that will decide what students should cook and create. 9th seat Eizan Etsuya arrives at the Polar Star dorm to announce its closure. However, Soma asks if a Shokugeki can overturn the decision. Eizan accepts his challenge. Later on, Eizan broadcasts live a Shokugeki with Kabutoyama Tetsuji, head of the Skewer Research Society, only to reveal that he has bribed the judges. While the other dorm residents lament their fate, Soma obstinately issues a Shokugeki challenge to Eizan. As their Shokugeki begins, Eizan directs his men to forcibly vacate the dorm, angering Soma.
45	8	"The Alchemist"; Transliteration: "Arukimisuta" (Japanese: 錬金術師(アルキミスタ))	Shinpei Nagai, Ei Tanaka	Shinichi Inozume	November 22, 2017	April 18, 2021
Soma refuses to be intimidated by Eizan's tactics and continues cooking, infuriating Eizan. Meanwhile, the Polar Star residents band together and repel Eizan's thugs. After further taunts from Soma, Eizan decides to cook seriously. With Satsuma Jidori Chicken as the theme, Eizan serves a Hainanese chicken rice dish that impresses both the judges and Soma. Soma responds with a special chicken wingtip gyoza dish that uses pork fat, parmesan cheese, and ketchup as special ingredients. He convinces Eizan to try his dish, and Eizan reluctantly acknowledges that Soma's dish tastes good. Seeing Eizan's reaction and tempted by the smell, the judges taste Soma's dish. Despite the unorthodox cooking methods used to make it, the judges are amazed its unique flavor and vote unanimously for Soma. Soma declares to the school that he will battle anybody who threatens his friends and Polar Star, including the Elite Ten.
46	9	"Hunting the Straggerlers" / "Hunting the Survivors"; Transliteration: "Zantōgari" (Japanese: 残党狩り)	Hiroyuki Okuno	Shogo Yasukawa	November 29, 2017	April 25, 2021
With Soma's victory, the Polar Star dorm is saved. The residents and Erina, Hisako, Takumi, and Isami celebrate the victory. Isshiki arrives and explains that thanks to Soma's victory, Central is now allowing school organizations to issue Shokugeki requests, which will be overseen by neutral judges. Several days later, Isshiki is dismissed from the Elite Ten, along with Kuga and 3rd seat Megishima, as they voted against Azami's installation. The rest of the Elite Ten and other Central members begin to "hunt the survivors" by defeating other school societies in their Shokugeki matches. Soma and his friends observe the matches to gain intelligence on their potential opponents. Alice and Kurokiba arrive for the final Shokugeki of the day, with all previous matches having resulted in a win for Central. Alice explains that she had inadvertently become the head of the Cutting Edge Cuisine RS, making her a target in the hunt. Kurokiba accepted the challenge on her behalf, and prepares to face off against Central member Kusunoki Rentaro, with the main ingredient of salmon.
47	10	"Dance of the Salmon" / "The Salmon Will Dance"; Transliteration: "Sake wa Odoru" (Japanese: 鮭は踊る)	Makoto Noriza	Shinichi Inozume	December 6, 2017	May 2, 2021
As the two contestants begin cooking, it is revealed that Rentaro is an expert in low temperature cooking and he makes use of a combi steamer and cryomill to create a salmon confit flamme with a side of salmon ice cream. Ryo responds by baking a coulibiac. As the judges deliberate on which dish is better, Rentaro boasts that he submerged his salmon in olive oil while cooking it, preventing moisture from escaping and preserving all the flavor. However, the judges declare that Kurokiba's dish is superior. Kurokiba reveals that he inserted a spinach crêpe and a special spice mix into his coulibiac. In addition, his blend of various uneven flavors accentuated the taste of his salmon, giving a dynamic sensation far better than Rentaro's salmon. Kurokiba is declared the winner as Azami enters the arena.
48	11	"Der Weiße Ritter der Tafel" / "The White Knight of the Panel"; Transliteration: "Shokutaku no Shirokishi" (Japanese: 食卓の白騎士)	Kyohei Suzuki	Shogo Yasukawa	December 13, 2017	May 9, 2021
Erina arrives at the arena as Alice berates Azami, and tells Erina to stand up for herself. The next day, Soma volunteers to be Tsukasa Eishi's sous-chef during class, impressing Tsukasa with his skills. At the end of class, Tsukasa asks Soma to join Central as his assistant, and Soma refuses. Tsukasa then challenges Soma to an informal Shokugeki and wagers his position as first seat in return for Soma joining Central. Erina, Hisako, and Megumi watch from a distance, hidden. Soma asks Tsukasa what Azami and Central's true plans are. Tsukasa reveals Azami's ultimate long-term goal: to eliminate all restaurants in Japan and replace them with fine dining gourmet eateries that only he approves of. Realizing this means the end of many local restaurants, such as Yukihira Diner, Soma resolves to beat Tsukasa.
49	12	"Those Who Strive for the Top" / "The One Who Aims for the Summit"; Transliteration: "Itadaki wo Mezasu Mono" (Japanese: 頂を目指す者)	Sato Mitsutoshi, Ei Tanaka, Shinpei Nagai	Shogo Yasukawa	December 20, 2017	May 16, 2021
Soma creates a charcoal grilled venison thigh with sweet chestnut sauce, while Tsukasa makes roast venison back strap with peppercorn and berry sauce. Erina, Hisako, and Megumi judge the dishes and reluctantly declare Tsukasa the winner. However, Tsukasa decides not to force Soma into Central, saying that Soma's unorthodox and non-wavering cooking style would hinder his own cooking. The second Survivor Hunt begins a few days later, with Megumi, Ikumi, and Marui managing to save their respective clubs. That night, Azami pays a visit to Polar Star, where he is coldly received. As he leaves, Soma confronts Azami, who reveals that he was part of the Polar Star's Golden Generation, and that he revered Joichiro and his cooking. Soma tells Azami that Joichiro is his father, right as Erina arrives, shocking both Azami and Erina. Azami arrogantly declares that the revolution he is planning is meant to bring down the food culture that "ruined" Joichiro, leaving both Soma and Erina wondering what happened between Joichiro and Azami.
Part 2
50	13	"Advancement Exam"; Transliteration: "Shinkyū Shiken" (Japanese: 進級試験)	Mitsutoshi Satou	Shogo Yasukawa	April 9, 2018	May 23, 2021
Tsukasa announces that the Advancement Exam will take place for first year students at the end of the semester. Unlike past exams, all students are guaranteed to pass if they stick to the curriculum and follow Central's orders. Soma and his friends realize that Central will be using the Advancement Exam to eliminate all those who oppose Azami. As they begin to lose hope, Erina visits Soma and tells him that it was Joichiro's cooking that inspired her to be a chef, but with Azami's return, she is conflicted over whether she wants to cook or not. Soma decides to inspire Erina again by cooking a special Yukihira dish: a tempura bowl that utilizes a fried frozen egg. Upon tasting it, Erina remembers how happy she felt tasting Joichiro's cooking, and decides to oppose Azami. The next morning, Erina gathers all the Polar Star residents and tells them that she will help them pass the exam.
51	14	"The Totsuki Train Heads Forth" / "Onward on the Totsuki Train"; Transliteration: "Tōtsuki-ressha wa Iku" (Japanese: 遠月列車は行)	Shinpei Nagai	Shogo Yasukawa	April 16, 2018	May 30, 2021
Hisako informs the Polar Star residents that the Advancement Exam will take place in Hokkaido. They will travel from the south end of the island to the north as they pass the exam stages. Erina spends the next week teaching the Polar Star residents, Nikumi, and the Aldini brothers everything she knows about Hokkaido ingredients and cuisine. For the first stage of the Exam, all the students are separated into teams; Soma is teamed with Megumi, Alice, Kurokiba, and Yuki. Teams must prepare a single salmon dish, but Soma's team is deliberately given the lowest quality salmon. Since salmon is out of season, there is no way to get one fresh. Thanks to Erina's lessons, Soma's team remembers that salmon can be frozen in brine, preserving their flavor. They procure one such salmon from a local vendor and prepare a delicious Yuan-style Grilled Tokishirazu Salmon dish, and the judge passes them. The other rebel teams also manage to overcome Central's interference. The students move onto the second stage of the Exam on a special train. Soma visits Erina during the night, and Erina realizes that she no longer feels annoyed when she's in Soma's presence.
52	15	"Joan of Arc Arises" / "Jeanne d'Arc Rises"; Transliteration: "Tachiagaru Onna Kishi" (Japanese: 立ち上がる女騎士)	Toshiki Fukushima	Shogo Yasukawa	April 23, 2018	June 6, 2021
Soma and his friends arrive in Sapporo for the second stage of the exam, where they are tasked with making a noodle dish. However, the test is designed so that the rebels must go last. Most of the ingredients have been used up by the other students, and the arrival of a heavy blizzard prevents them from getting more. Regardless, Soma and his friends remember Erina's lessons and use leftover potatoes to make gosetsu udon. The examiner reluctantly passes them, noting how Erina rallied the rebels under her leadership. The students are allowed to explore Sapporo, and Erina takes the time to fully appreciate the new friends she's made. When they return to the train, they find out that the rebels have been split up on separate trains. Soma, Erina, Megumi, and Takumi find themselves on a train with Rindou, who informs them that their next challenge is to defeat the Elite Ten.
53	16	"Revenge Match"; Transliteration: "Ribenji Matchi" (Japanese: リベンジ・マッチ)	Shigeki Kurii	Shogo Yasukawa	April 30, 2018	June 13, 2021
Soma is tasked with facing against the newest Elite Ten member, Hayama, while Takumi and Megumi are to face Rindou. Dojima arrives to judge Soma and Hayama's match, announcing that the theme ingredient will be bear meat. Soma quickly learns that bear meat is more difficult to cook than other meats due to its strong smell and gamey taste. To nullify its smell, spices are required, which gives Hayama an advantage. Kuga unexpectedly arrives with his Chinese cooking team and assists Soma by providing him with a number of spices to work with. Soma suggests that they head out into the mountains to observe the habitat of a bear. As they research, Soma discovers that he can use schisandra berries to counter the smell of the bear meat. However, Hayama arrives, saying that he has already come up with the optimal spice mix to counter the smell. He boasts that he will defeat Soma, just like he did in the Autumn Elections.
54	17	"Walking the Tightrope of Umami" / "The Umami Tightrope"; Transliteration: "Umami no Tsunawatari" (Japanese: 旨味の綱渡り)	Sega Kajii	Shogo Yasukawa	May 7, 2018	June 20, 2021
Dojima tells Soma and Kuga that Hayama was coerced into joining Central, as Azami is holding all of Shiomi's research hostage. Soma chastises Akira for giving in to Azami so easily, and tells him not to hold back angering Hayama resolving to fully crush Soma. Kuga reminds Soma that the other rebels are cooking against other members of the Elite Ten, and says that it is unrealistic to expect all of them to pass. Alice's father, Soe Nakiri, and his research staff, Bertha and Sheila, are the judges for Soma's match. Soma and Hayama both decide to create fried bear dishes. Soma finishes his dish first, a fried bear meat cutlet, impressing the judges with the taste and his willingness to take a risk by using the smelliest yet tastiest parts of the bear. However, when Akira presents his dish, everyone stares at in awe.
55	18	"For Someone's Sake" / "For Whom"; Transliteration: "Dare ga Tame ni" (Japanese: 誰が為に)	Kyohei Suzuki	Shogo Yasukawa	May 14, 2018	June 27, 2021
The judges taste Hayama's fried bear, and conclude that it is superior to Soma's cutlet, but decide that they must also test the accompanying sauces. Hayama's juniper berry gravy is powerful, but Soma creates a superior sauce using caramelized honey and balsamic vinegar. The final vote is close, but is ultimately decided in Soma's favor. Hayama initially couldn't believe that Soma could have best him but Dojima point out the difference in passion he pour to his dish compare what he serve Autumm Election because Jun couldn't support his decision that he lost his desire and drive that pushing his cooking further when he question Soma question about his resolve Soma angerly chastise him that he work hard as he did so he could taste his dish and that couldn't stand see him distract once Akira taste Soma's dishes he realizes the passion that Soma put into his dish soon Jun appear and slap Akira and tells him that she want him to enjoyed cooking with his classmates and friends not worried about research seminar and Akira finally realize he geniue enjoyed cooking everyone. Then, one of Azami's aides arrives and informs Akira that he has been expelled due to his loss.
56	19	"A Declaration of War" / "Declaration of War"; Transliteration: "Sensen Fukoku" (Japanese: 宣戦布告)	Ei Tanaka	Shogo Yasukawa	May 21, 2018	July 4, 2021
With the exception of Soma, Erina, Megumi, and Takumi, all of the rebels lose their matches against the Elite Ten and are expelled. The remaining rebels decide that the only way to overturn the expulsions is to challenge the Elite Ten to a Shokugeki, but they cannot convince Azami to agree to the challenge. Joichiro and Senzaemon unexpectedly arrive and propose a team Shokugeki called a Regiment de Cuisine. Joichiro offers to join Central if the rebels lose, and Azami agrees. Joichiro, Senzaemon, and Dojima proceed to personally train Soma and his friends. They start with a 3v3 cooking match where Joichiro, Soma, and Erina compete against Dojima, Megumi, and Takumi. They must cook Hachis Parmentier, with an additional rule that teammates may not speak to each other. During this match, both Joichiro and Dojima diverge from the standard hachis parmentier recipe to further test the students.
57	20	"Erina's Devotion" / "Erina's Diligent Studies"; Transliteration: "Erina no Kensan" (Japanese: えりなの研鑽)	Makoto Noriza	Shogo Yasukawa	May 28, 2018	July 11, 2021
Soma, Erina, Megumi, and Takumi quickly catch on to what Joichiro and Dojima intend to do with their dishes and both teams manage to complete their own unique take on hachis parmentier. Senzaemon has both teams taste the other's dish and decide on winner, but both teams insist that the other is the winner. The match is declared a draw, and Senzaemon points out how the exercise was successful in fostering teamwork among them and convincing Erina to leave her comfort zone and improvise in the kitchen. The group then meets Azami to finalize the rules of the Team Shokugeki. Both sides agree that the rebels will take the Elite Ten seats if they win, and if they lose, they will be expelled and Joichiro will join Central. Azami tries to pressure Erina into siding with the Elite Ten. After some hesitation, Erina resigns from the 10th seat and joins the rebel team. Azami adds one final condition: if the rebels lose, Erina must join Central. With the rules decided, both sides leave to prepare for the upcoming showdown.
58	21	"He Who Clears a Path Through the Wilderness" / "The Pioneer of the Wastelands"; Transliteration: "Kōya o Hiraku Mono" (Japanese: 荒野を拓く者)	Sega Kajii	Shogo Yasukawa	June 4, 2018	July 18, 2021
As Erina sleeps, Joichiro and Dojima tell Soma, Megumi, and Takumi about their time at Polar Star with Azami. As a student, Joichiro proved to be a cooking prodigy, earning a seat in the Elite Ten in his first year. He won countless cooking competitions and Shokugekis, culminating in him singlehandedly defeating over 100 opponents in a Team Shokugeki, earning the title "Demon". However, the continued success began to take its toll, as every win put pressure on him to perform even better next time, resulting in a nervous breakdown. Senzaemon advised that he take a leave of absence to rediscover his passion for cooking. After the story, Joichiro challenges Soma to another cook-off. Dojima watches the two of them, silently thanking Soma for helping reignite Joichiro's passion for cooking.
59	22	"To the Site of the Final Battle" / "To the Final Battleground"; Transliteration: "Kessen no Chi e" (Japanese: 決戦の地へ)	Shigeki Kurii	Shogo Yasukawa	June 11, 2018	July 25, 2021
Soma manages to recruit Satoshi, Kuga, Megishima, and Mimasaka for the Team Shokugeki to make the match an 8 vs 8. As the contest begins, Soma, Satoshi, and Megashima are matched against Kinokuni Nene and two replacement Elite Ten members, with Soma having to face Nene. Unfortunately, Soma draws soba as their theme, which is Nene's specialty. Soma decides to counter this disadvantage by making an instant yakisoba dish, which he feels will do better conveying his cooking than a regular soba dish. Meanwhile, Isshiki battles against the new 8th seat, Shiratsu Jurio, over an eel dish. Jurio begins insulting Satoshi, wondering why he, a cook from a prominent family, would associate himself with the "lowlifes" of Polar Star. This angers Satoshi and he vows to completely crush Jurio.
60	23	"For the Sake of Kyokusei Dorm" / "Bearing Polar Star Dormitory"; Transliteration: "Kyokuseiryō o Seotte" (Japanese: 極星寮を背負って)	Toshiki Fukushima	Shogo Yasukawa	June 18, 2018	August 1, 2021
As the match continues, it is revealed that Satoshi and Nene are actually childhood friends. Officials from the World Gourmet Organization (WGO) arrive to be judges for the match. Jurio finishes first and presents his eel stew dish. Satoshi then presents his Hitsumabushi dish, which incorporates ingredients created by the Polar Star students. The dish easily defeats Jurio's, and Jurio is forced to apologize to the Polar Star residents. Nene then promises that she will challenge Satoshi in the next round, saying that she had always resented him due to his natural ability to excel at anything with little effort. However, Satoshi warns her that she will lose against Soma, as Soma brings out a wok and begins stir frying his soba, shocking everybody.
61	24	"That Which Makes One Strong" / "The Basis for Strength"; Transliteration: "Kyōshataru Yuen" (Japanese: 強者たる所以(ゆえん))	Ei Tanaka	Shogo Yasukawa	June 25, 2018	August 1, 2021
Nene presents her soba dish, which includes kakiage sakura shrimp tempura, and the judges acknowledge her mastery of soba. Soma then presents his instant yakisoba dish, which also impresses the judges. Soma reveals he was inspired by the instant noodles he ate as a child, and how he continually experimented with ways to make them taste better. He decided to use sanbako flour, which can withstand being stir fried, rather the delicate ichibanko flour Nene used. The judges decide in Soma's favor, pointing out that the cold temperature of the arena affected the taste of Nene's soba. Satoshi tells Nene that her dedication to a single method of making soba made her too narrow-minded to consider variables like the effect of ambient temperature. Megishima also defeats his opponent, resulting in the rebels completely sweeping the first bout. Azami announces a short break before the second bout, and both sides prepare for the next battle.

== Home media release ==
=== Japanese ===
Warner Bros. Japan (Japan – Region 2/A)
Volume	Episodes	Release date	Ref.
Box Set 1	1–12	March 28, 2018	
Box Set 2	13–24	September 26, 2018	

=== English ===
Sentai Filmworks (North America – Region 1/A)
Volume	Episodes	Release date	Ref.
Complete Collection	38–61	February 25, 2020	
