= Ash Valenzuela-Heeger =

South African chef

- Born: Ashleigh Heeger; October 1989 (age 36); Mthatha, South Africa
- Other name: Ash Heeger
- Education: Silwood School of Cookery
- Spouse: Erin Valenzuela (m. 2019)
- Culinary career
- Cooking style: Sustainable
- Current restaurant: Riverine Rabbit (Birmingham)
- Previous restaurants: ASH; Riverine Rabbit (Cape Town)
- Television show: The Final Table

Ashleigh Valenzuela-Heeger (née Heeger; born October 1989) is a South African chef and television personality. She won the 2025 Michelin Guide Young Chef Award, while her Birmingham restaurant Riverine Rabbit received a Bib Gourmand.

== Early life ==
Ashleigh Heeger was born in Mthatha and grew up in Cape Town. She trained at the Silwood School of Cookery.

== Career ==
Early in her career, Heeger was mentored by Luke Dale-Roberts at his Cape Town restaurants La Colombe in Constantia Nek and The Test Kitchen in Woodstock. At his suggestion, she spent three years in London gaining experience at The Ledbury and Dinner by Heston Blumenthal before returning to South Africa. In 2016, Heeger opened her first sustainable restaurant ASH on Church Street in Cape Town CBD with her sister Mandy van der Berg. In 2018, the restaurant rebranded to Riverine Rabbit. For her sustainability, Heeger was named a 2018 WWF-SASSI trailblazer.

Also in 2018, Heeger competed in the Netflix reality series The Final Table with Alex Haupt.

In early 2020, she closed her Cape Town restaurant and relocated to England to be with her wife Erin. She held a position at Carters in Moseley. After hosting a series of pop-ups, the couple jointly re-opened Riverine Rabbit in the Stirchley suburb of Birmingham in 2024. She won the 2025 Michelin Guide Young Chef Award, while Riverine Rabbit received the Bib Gourmand. She was also shortlisted for Best Chef at the 2025 British Restaurant Awards and named a Rising Star in the world of food by The Observer.

== Personal life ==
In 2019, she married Erin Valenzuela, a materials scientist at the University of Birmingham.
