= Hare à la royale =

French culinary dish

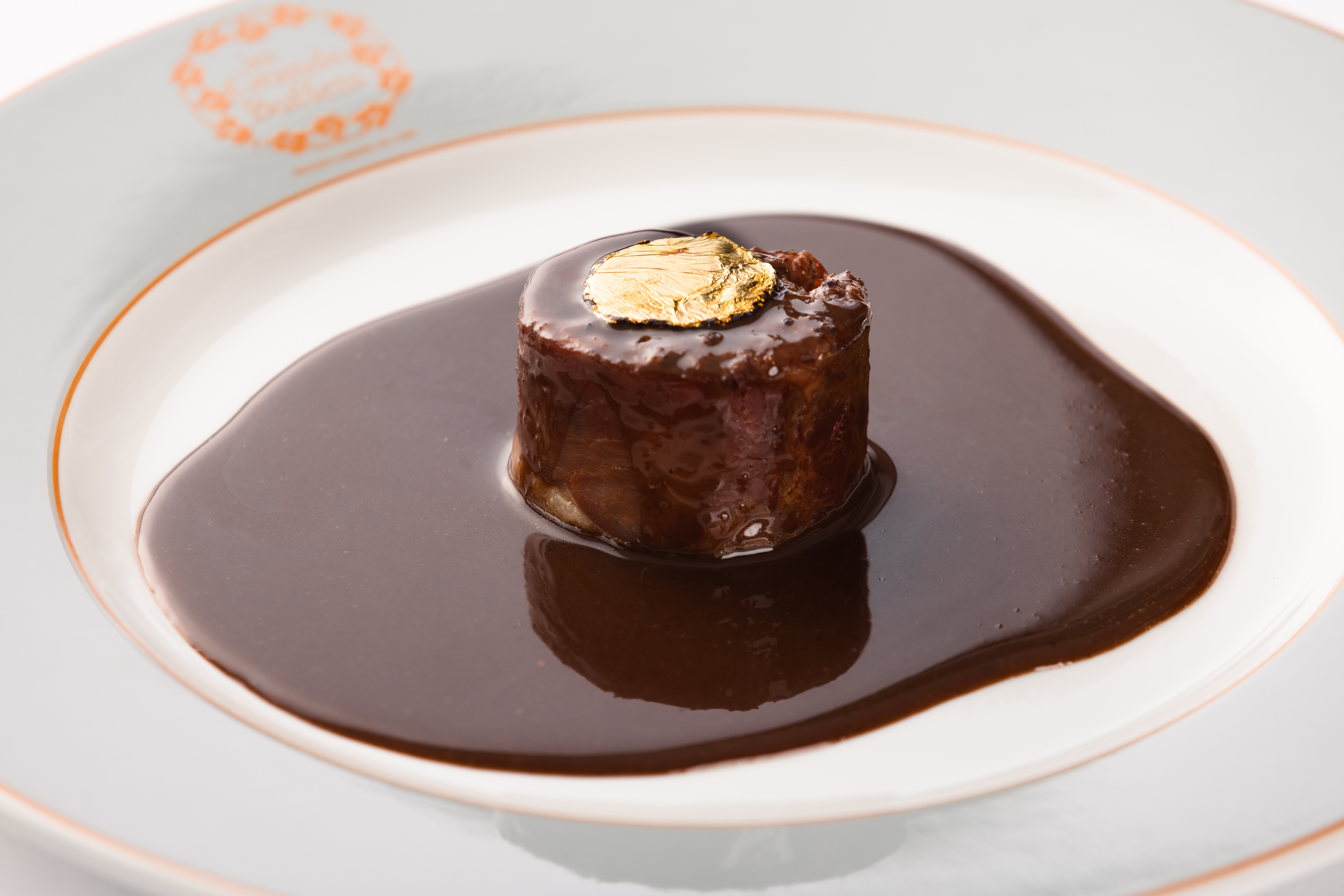
Plate of hare à la royale at the restaurant Les Grands Buffets in Narbonne

Hare à la royale (also called lièvre à la royale or royal hare) is a classic dish of French cuisine. A whole hare is slowly braised in red wine and served with a sauce made from its heart, liver, lungs and blood.

== Background ==
The culinary term à la royale has different meanings according to the dish to which it is applied. It may be used of clear soups; of fish or poultry poached and served hot, garnished with quenelles and mushrooms with poached oysters and truffles (fish) or foie gras (poultry); and of hot or cold desserts made from unusual ingredients and presented with sophistication.

Lièvre à la royale is a traditional dish, which, according to Larousse Gastronomique, is claimed by both Orléanais and Périgord as originating in their region. It is mentioned in several 19th-century French texts, but was brought to greater prominence by the senator and newspaper columnist Aristide Couteaux. In November 1898 he published a description of and recipe for lièvre à la royale in Le Temps. Elizabeth David, who printed a translation of the article in her first book, Mediterranean Food (1950), summarised it:

M. Couteaux related at length how he had spent a week in Poitou hunting the right kind of hare; how, the exactly suitable animal at last in his hands, he instantly took the train to Paris, sent out his invitations, and hurried off to consult his friend Spüller, who ran a well-known restaurant in the Rue Favart, to arrange the preparation and cooking of his hare for the following day. The dish takes from noon until 7 o'clock to prepare and cook … by 6 o'clock the exquisite aroma had penetrated the doors of Spüller's restaurant, floated down the street and out into the boulevard, where the passers-by sniffed the scented air; an excitable crowd gathered, and the whole quartier was "mis en émoi" [in uproar].

David adds that anyone willing to devote the time and ingredients needed to cook the dish will realise that the senator was not exaggerating.

== Composition ==
A hare is butchered but left whole. Its heart, liver and lungs are kept to one side, as is its blood. The hare is slowly poached in red wine with bacon, garlic, carrots, shallots and onions. When it is cooked it is taken out of the cooking dish, to which are then added the heart, liver and lungs, and more bacon, garlic and shallots, which are simmered and sieved. More red wine is added, together with the blood, diluted with cognac. The hare is presented whole, in the sauce, and according to Couteaux, is so tender that "to use a knife to serve the hare would be a sacrilege: a spoon alone is amply sufficient". (Note: "Je n'ai pas besoin de dire que, pour servir ce lièvre, l'emploi du couteau serait un sacrilège et que la seule cuillère y suffit complètement.")

There are later versions of the dish, adding slices of fresh foie gras and cream for additional richness. Paul Bocuse includes truffles as well as foie gras as optional additions. Joël Robuchon made the dish, based on Couteaux's recipe, for his presentation to the Compagnons du Devoir.

== Cited works ==
- David, Elizabeth (1999) [1980]. Elizabeth David Classics. London: Grub Street. ISBN 978-1-902304-27-4.
- Maubourguet, Patrice, ed. (2001) [1938]. Larousse Gastronomique. London: Paul Hamlyn. ISBN 978-0-60-060235-4.
- Morin, Frédéric; David McMillan; Meredith Erickson (2011). The Art of Living According to Joe Beef. Berkeley: Ten Speed Press. ISBN 978-1-60-774077-3.
