= Lisa (Japanese musician, born 1987) discography =

Lisa discography
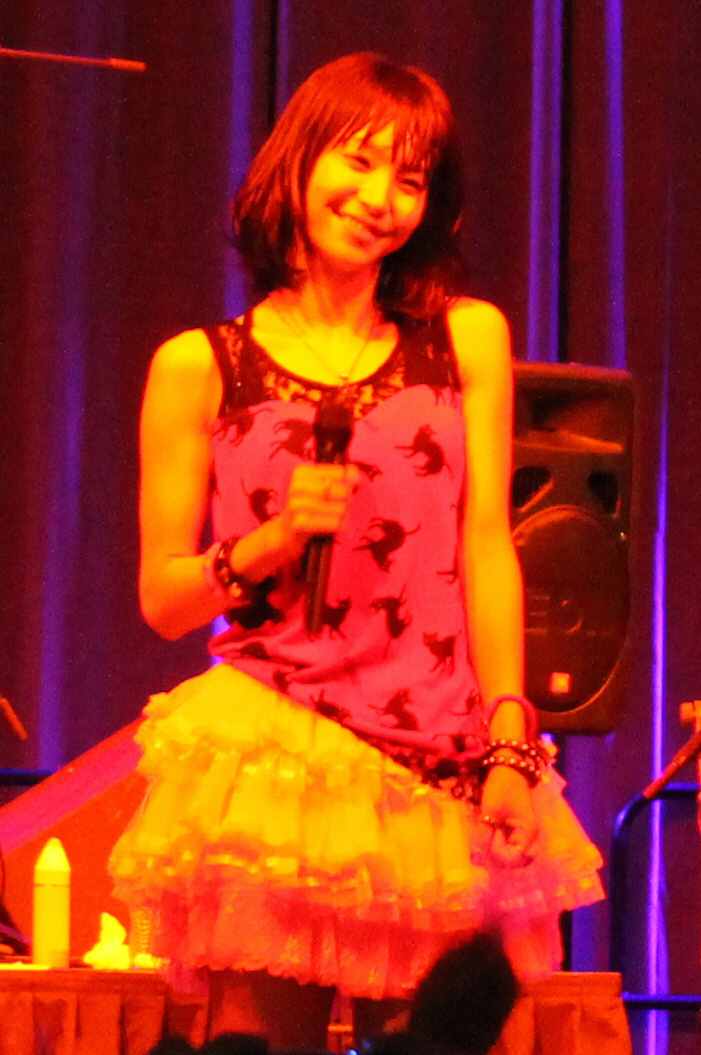
- LiSA performing at Anime Expo 2012 in Los Angeles
- Studio albums: 7
- EPs: 3
- Soundtrack albums: 1
- Compilation albums: 2
- Singles: 20
- Video albums: 5
- Music videos: 58

The discography of Japanese musician, Lisa includes 7 studio albums, 2 compilation albums, 3 extended plays, 19 singles, and 5 video albums. LiSA debuted in 2010 as a part of Girls Dead Monster, a musical group featured in the anime Angel Beats!, an anime featuring a high school rock band. Lisa recorded music as the singing voice for the character Yui, and released her first single as a part of the group, "Thousand Enemies", in May 2010 through Key Sounds Label. In June 2010, Girls Dead Monster released Keep the Beats!, an album entirely composed of songs sung by Lisa. The album was commercially successful; certified gold by the Recording Industry Association of Japan.

In April 2011, Lisa made her debut as a soloist with the extended play Letters to U, through the Sony Music Entertainment Japan sub-label Aniplex. Following this with the single "Oath Sign", recorded for the 2011 anime series Fate/Zero, she released her debut album Lover"s"mile in February 2012.

Much of Lisa's music has been used for theme songs of anime in Japan. Outside of her music for Angel Beats!, Lisa has sung songs for Fate/Zero and Fate/stay night, Sword Art Online, Day Break Illusion, The Irregular at Magic High School, Nisekoi, Demon Slayer: Kimetsu no Yaiba and the Sega fighting game Dengeki Bunko: Fighting Climax.

== Albums ==
=== Studio albums ===
List of studio albums, with selected details, chart positions, sales and certification
Title	Details	Peak chart positions			Sales	Certifications
Title	Details	JPN	JPN Comb (Note: The Oricon Combined Albums Chart was established on December 24, 2018.)	KOR	Sales	Certifications
Lover"s"mile	Released: February 22, 2012 (JPN); Label: Aniplex; Formats: CD, CD+DVD, CD+Blu-ray, digital download	7	—	33 (Note: Also peaked at number 4 on Gaon International Album Chart)	JPN: 21,000	
Landspace	Released: October 30, 2013 (JPN); Label: Aniplex; Formats: CD, CD+DVD+Blu-ray, digital download	2	—	—	JPN: 25,000	
Launcher	Released: March 4, 2015 (JPN); Label: Aniplex; Formats: CD, CD+DVD, CD+Blu-ray, digital download	3	—	—	JPN: 36,000	
Little Devil Parade	Released: May 24, 2017 (JPN); Label: Sacra Music; Formats: CD, CD+DVD, CD+Blu-ray, digital download	4	—	—	JPN: 51,000 (Note: Combined sales figures for Little Devil Parade: 43,381 (physical sales) + 7,600 (digital sales).)	
Leo-Nine	Released: October 14, 2020 (JPN); Label: Sacra Music; Formats: CD, CD+DVD, CD+Blu-ray, digital download	1	1	—	JPN: 170,000 (Note: Combined sales figures for Leo-Nine: 152,722 (physical sales) + 17,163 (digital sales).)	RIAJ: Gold (phy.)
Lander	Released: November 16, 2022 (JPN); Label: Sacra Music; Formats: CD, CD+DVD, CD+Blu-ray, digital download	3	3	—	JPN: 26,499	
Lace Up	Released: April 15, 2026 (JPN); Label: Sacra Music; Formats: CD, CD+DVD, CD+Blu-ray, digital download	4	5	—	JPN: 15,183	
"—" denotes releases that were not released or did not chart in that region.

=== Compilation albums ===
List of compilation albums, with selected details, chart positions and sales
Title	Details	Peak chart positions		Sales
Title	Details	JPN	TWN	Sales
Lisa Best -Day-	Released: May 9, 2018 (JPN); Label: Sacra Music; Formats: CD, CD+DVD, CD+Blu-ray	2	1	JPN: 88,000 (Note: Combined sales figures for Lisa Best -Day-: 77,017 (physical sales) + 11,735 (digital sales).)
Lisa Best -Way-	Released: May 9, 2018 (JPN); Label: Sacra Music; Formats: CD, CD+DVD, CD+Blu-ray	1	1	JPN: 91,000 (Note: Combined sales figures for Lisa Best -Way-: 78,659 (physical sales) + 12,509 (digital sales).)

== Extended plays ==
List of extended plays, with selected details, chart positions and sales
Title	Details	Peak chart positions		Sales
Title	Details	JPN	JPN Comb (Note: The Oricon Combined Albums Chart was established on December 24, 2018.)	Sales
Letters to U	Released: April 20, 2011 (JPN); Label: Aniplex; Formats: CD, LP, digital download	14	—	JPN: 14,000
Lucky Hi Five!	Released: April 20, 2016 (JPN); Label: Aniplex; Formats: CD, CD+DVD, CD+Blu-ray, digital download	4	—	JPN: 28,000
Ladybug	Released: May 19, 2021 (JPN); Label: Sacra Music; Formats: CD, CD+DVD, CD+Blu-ray, digital download	2	2	JPN: 30,569
"—" denotes releases that were not released or did not chart in that region.

== Soundtracks ==
List of soundtrack albums, with selected details, chart positions and certification
Title	Details	Peak chart positions		Certifications
Title	Details	JPN	JPN Comb (Note: The Oricon Combined Albums Chart was established on December 24, 2018.)	Certifications
Keep the Beats! (as part of Girls Dead Monster)	Soundtrack for the anime Angel Beats!; Released: June 30, 2010 (JPN); Label: Key Sounds; Formats: CD, digital download	6	—	RIAJ: Gold
Gurenge / Homura	Soundtrack for the anime Demon Slayer: Kimetsu no Yaiba; Released: March 13, 2021 (JPN); Label: Sacra Music; Formats: CD, digital download	13	18	
"—" denotes releases that were not released or did not chart in that region.

== Singles ==
=== As lead artist ===
List of singles, with selected chart positions, showing year released, certification and album name
Title	Year	Peak chart positions						Certifications	Album
Title	Year	JPN	JPN Cmb. (Note: The Oricon Combined Singles Chart was established on December 24, 2018.)	JPN Hot (Note: Sources for chart positions are as follows: "Thousand Enemies", "Little Braver", "Ichiban no Takaramono", "Oath Sign", "Crossing Field", "Best Day, Best Way", "Träumerei", "Rising Hope", "Bright Flight", "Shirushi", "Rally Go Round", "Empty Mermaid", "ID", "Brave Freak Out", "Catch the Moment", "Datte Atashi no Hero", "Ash", "Narrative", "Akai Wana", "Adamas", "Gurenge", "Unlasting", "Homura", "Saikai", "Dawn", "Another Great Day!!" "Hadashi no Step", "Yuke", "Akeboshi", "Shirogane", "Issei no Kassai", "Realize", "Social Path", "Shouted Serenade", "Reawaker", "Shine in the Cruel Night")	NZ Hot	US World	WW	Certifications	Album
"Oath Sign"	2011	5	—	8	—	—	—	RIAJ: Gold (phy.); Platinum (dig.)	Lover"s"mile
"Crossing Field"	2012	5	—	10	—	3	—	RIAJ: Gold (phy.); Platinum (dig.); Gold (st.)	Landspace
"Best Day, Best Way"	2013	6	—	22	—	—	—		Landspace
"Träumerei"	2013	15	—	16	—	—	—		Landspace
"Rising Hope"	2014	4	—	3	—	—	—	RIAJ: Platinum (dig.); Gold (st.)	Launcher
"Bright Flight"	2014	8	—	18	—	—	—		Launcher
"L. Miranic"	2014	8	—	—	—	—	—		Launcher
"Shirushi" (シルシ)	2014	3	—	3	—	6	—	RIAJ: Gold (dig.)	Launcher
"Rally Go Round"	2015	12	—	7	—	—	—		Little Devil Parade
"Empty Mermaid"	2015	10	—	7	—	—	—		Little Devil Parade
"Brave Freak Out"	2016	9	—	7	—	—	—		Little Devil Parade
"Catch the Moment"	2017	4	—	3	—	—	—	RIAJ: Platinum (dig.); Gold (st.)	Little Devil Parade
"Datte Atashi no Hero" (だってアタシのヒーロー。)	2017	7	—	7	—	—	—		Lisa Best -Day-
"Ash"	2017	5	—	5	—	—	—	RIAJ: Gold (dig.)	Lisa Best -Way-
"Akai Wana (Who Loves It?)" (赤い罠(who loves it?))	2018	2	2	30	—	—	—		Leo-Nine
"Adamas"	2018	2	2	4	—	20	—	RIAJ: Platinum (dig.)	Leo-Nine
"Gurenge" (紅蓮華)	2019	3	2	2	—	7	73	RIAJ: Platinum (phy.); Million (dig.); 3× Platinum (st.)	Leo-Nine
"Unlasting"	2019	4	3	6	—	—	—	RIAJ: Gold (dig.)	Leo-Nine
"Homura" (炎)	2020	1	1	1	—	7	8	RIAJ: Platinum (phy.); Million (dig.); 3× Platinum (st.)	Lander
"Dawn"	2021	5	9	11	—	—	—		Lander
"Hadashi no Step"	2021	5	6	14	—	—	—		Lander
"Akeboshi" (明け星)	2021	4	2	1	—	19	107	RIAJ: Gold (phy.); Platinum (dig.); Gold (st.)	Lander
"Shirogane" (白銀)	2021	4	2	4	—	—	— (Note: "Shirogane" did not enter the Billboard Global 200 chart, however it charted at number 139 on the Billboard Global Excl. U.S. chart.)	RIAJ: Gold (phy.); Gold (dig.)	Lander
"Shouted Serenade"	2024	13	38	56	—	—	—		Lace Up
"Black Box" (ブラックボックス)	2024	9	44	—	—	—	—		Lace Up
"Reawaker" (featuring Felix)	2025	7	29	56	38	1	— (Note: "Reawaker" did not enter the Billboard Global 200 chart or Billboard Global Excl. US, however it charted at number 1 on the Billboard Global Japan Songs Excl. Japan chart.)		Lace Up
"Shine in the Cruel Night" (残酷な夜に輝け)	2025	7	8	4	—	7	— (Note: "Shine in the Cruel Night" did not enter the Billboard Global 200 chart or Billboard Global Excl. US, however it charted at number 17 on the Billboard Global Japan Songs Excl. Japan chart.)	RIAJ: Gold (dig.)	Lace Up
"—" denotes releases that did not chart.

=== As a featured artist ===
List of singles as a featured artist, with selected chart positions, showing year released and album name
Title	Year	Peak chart positions		Album
Title	Year	JPN	JPN Hot	Album
"Thousand Enemies" (as part of Girls Dead Monster)	2010	4	19	Keep the Beats!
"Little Braver" (as part of Girls Dead Monster)	2010	2	15	Keep the Beats!
"Ichiban no Takaramono (Yui Final Version)" (一番の宝物) (Girls Dead Monster starring LiSA)	2010	3	7	Keep the Beats!
"Orpheus (Kimi to Kanaderu Ashita e no Uta)" (Orpheus ～君と奏でる明日へのうた～) (Lia, Aoi Tada, Mami Kawada, Eiko Shimamiya, Kotoko, Kaori Utatsuki, Chata, Rita, LiSA)	2012	—	— (Note: Charted at number 53 on the Billboard independent albums and singles chart.)	Non-album single
"Narrative" (SawanoHiroyuki[nZk] featuring LiSA)	2018	10	14	Remember
"From the Edge" (FictionJunction featuring LiSA)	2019	16	16	Parade
"Social Path" (Stray Kids featuring Lisa)	2023	—	27	Social Path (Feat. Lisa) / Super Bowl (Japanese Ver.)
"—" denotes releases that did not chart.

=== Promotional singles ===
List of promotional singles, with selected chart positions, showing year released and album name
Title	Year	Peak chart positions			Certifications	Album
Title	Year	JPN Comb (Note: The Oricon Combined Singles Chart was established on December 24, 2018.)	JPN Hot	WW Excl. US	Certifications	Album
"Mr. Launcher"	2015	—	— (Note: Charted at number 64 on the Adult Alternative Airplay chart.)	—		Launcher
"ID"	2015	—	86	—		Lisa Best -Day-
"Little Devil Parade"	2017	—	77	—		Little Devil Parade
"Thrill Risk Heartless"	2018	—	5	—		Lisa Best -Way-
"Aijō" (愛錠)	2020	42	54	—		Leo-Nine
"Makoto Shiyaka" (マコトシヤカ)	2020	—	96	—		Leo-Nine
"Play the World"	2020	—	— (Note: "Play the World" did not enter the Japan Hot 100, however it charted at number 38 on the Billboard Japan Top Download Songs chart.)	—		Leo-Nine
"Saikai" (再会) (with Uru)	2020	—	10	144	RIAJ: Gold (dig.); Platinum (str.)	Non-album single
"Another Great Day!!"	2021	—	68	—		Ladybug
"Yuke" (往け)	2021	31	22	104		Lander
"Shifuku no Toki" (シフクノトキ)	2022	—	—	—		Lander
"New Me"	2022	—	—	—		Lander
"Doyoubi no Watashitachi wa" (土曜日のわたしたちは)	2022	—	—	—		Lander
"Issei no Kassai" (一斉ノ喝采)	2022	—	46	—		Lander
"Realize"	2023	—	79	—		Lace Up
"Hello World"	2024	—	—	—		Lace Up
"Queen"	2024	—	—	—		Lace Up
"Sweet Magic"	2026	—	—	—		Lace Up
"Yes"	2026	—	—	—		Lace Up
"—" denotes releases that did not chart.

== Other appearances ==
List of miscellaneous material or guest appearances that feature LiSA
Title	Year	Album	Ref.
"Crow Song"	2011	Animelo Summer Live 2010: Evolution 8.28 (video album)	
"Brave Song" (Note: "Brave Song" was sung with Lia and Marina.)	2011	Animelo Summer Live 2010: Evolution 8.28 (video album)	
"Crossing Field"	2014	Animelo Summer Live 2013: Flag Nine 8.24 (video album)	
"Träumerei"	2014	Animelo Summer Live 2013: Flag Nine 8.24 (video album)	
"Crow Song"	2014	Animelo Summer Live 2013: Flag Nine 8.24 (video album)	
"Yūkei Yesterday" (夕景イエスタデイ) (Jin featuring LiSA)	2014	Mekakucity Actors 5 (Note: DVD release. Song compiled in the DVD packaging as a bonus CD.)	
"Headphone Actor" (ヘッドフォンアクター) (Jin featuring LiSA)	2014	Mekakucity Actors 6	
"This Illusion"	2015	Fate/stay night: Unlimited Blade Works	
"Yobanashi Deceive" (夜咄ディセイブ) (Jin featuring LiSA & Maria from Garnidelia)	2015	Mekakucity M's Complete Box	
"Haretara Ii ne" (晴れたらいいね)	2015	Watashi to Dorikamu 2: Dorikamu Wonderland 2015 Kaisai Ki'nen Best Covers	
"Moonlight Densetsu" (ムーンライト伝説)	2018	Sailor Moon 25th Anniversary Memorial Tribute	
"Roppongi Shinjuu"	2024	The Hit Parade II	

== Video albums ==
List of video albums, with selected details and chart positions
Title	Details	Peak chart positions	
Title	Details	JPN DVD	JPN BD
Girls Dead Monster starring Lisa Tour 2010 Final: Keep the Angel Beats!	Released: June 1, 2011 (JPN); Label: Key Sounds; Formats: DVD, Blu-ray	—	2
Live is Smile Always: Lover"s"mile in Hibiya Yagai Daiongakudō	Released: September 26, 2012 (JPN); Label: Aniplex; Formats: DVD, Blu-ray	66	18
Live is Smile Always: Kyō mo ii Hi da in Nippon Budokan	Released: June 18, 2014 (JPN); Label: Aniplex; Formats: DVD, Blu-ray	24	16
Live is Smile Always: Pink & Black "Ichigo Donuts" in Nippon Budokan	Released: July 22, 2015 (JPN); Label: Aniplex; Formats: DVD, Blu-ray	24	16
Live is Smile Always: Pink & Black "Choco Donuts" in Nippon Budokan	Released: July 22, 2015 (JPN); Label: Aniplex; Formats: DVD, Blu-ray	23	12
Lisa Music Video Clips 2011-2015	Released: June 29, 2016 (JPN); Label: Aniplex; Formats: DVD, Blu-ray	5	5
Live is Smile Always: Never Ending Glory at Yokohama Arena [the Sun]	Released: April 4, 2017 (JPN); Label: Sacra Music; Formats: DVD, Blu-ray	11	5
Live is Smile Always: Never Ending Glory at Yokohama Arena [the Moon]	Released: April 4, 2017 (JPN); Label: Sacra Music; Formats: DVD, Blu-ray	8	4
Live is Smile Always: Asia Tour 2018 [eN + core] Live & Document	Released: May 15, 2019 (JPN); Label: Sacra Music; Formats: DVD, Blu-ray	1	1
Live is Smile Always: 364+Joker at Yokohama Arena	Released: March 4, 2020 (JPN); Label: Sacra Music; Formats: DVD, Blu-ray	10	4
"—" denotes releases that did not chart.

== Music videos ==
List of music videos, showing year released and directors
Title	Year	Director(s)	Ref.
"Little Braver" (as part of Girls Dead Monster)	2010	Kōji "Popolo" Fujita	
"Day Game" (as part of Girls Dead Monster)	2010	Yūsuke Higashitani	
"Believe in Myself"	2011	Tomoo Noda	
"Mōsō Controller" (妄想コントローラー)	2011	Kenjiro Harigai	
"Oath Sign"	2011	Tomoo Noda	
"Crossing Field"	2012	Tomoo Noda	
"Best Day, Best Way"	2013	Tomoo Noda	
"I'm a Rock Star"	2013	Unknown	
"Träumerei"	2013	Tomoo Noda	
"Rising Hope"	2014	Tomoo Noda	
"Bright Flight"	2014	Tomoo Noda	
"L.Miranic"	2014	Tomoo Noda	
"Shirushi"	2014	Tomoo Noda	
"Rally Go Round"	2015	Takashi Tadokoro	
"Empty Mermaid"	2015	Takano Isao	
"Hi Five!"	2016	Unknown	
"Brave Freak Out"	2016	Unknown	
"Catch the Moment"	2017	Unknown	
"Little Devil Parade"	2017	Unknown	
"Datte Atashi no Hero."	2017	Unknown	
"Ash"	2017	Unknown	
"Thrill, Risk, Heartless"	2018	Unknown	
"Narrative" (as guest vocalist of SawanoHiroyuki[nZk])	2018	Unknown	
"Adamas"	2018	Unknown	
"Akai Wana: Who Loves It?"	2018	Unknown	
"Believe in ourselves"	2018	Unknown	
"Gurenge"	2019	Unknown	
"Unlasting"	2019	Unknown	
"Howl"	2019	Unknown	
"Aijou"	2020	Unknown	
"Makotoshiyaka"	2020	Unknown	
"play the world! feat. Pablo"	2020	Unknown	
"Homura"	2020	Unknown	
"dawn"	2021	Unknown	
"Another Great Day!!"	2021	Unknown	
"Letters to Me"	2021	Unknown	
"Surprise"	2021	Unknown	
"Nonnon"	2021	Unknown	
"Hadashi no Step"	2021	Unknown	
"Yuke"	2021	Unknown	
"Akeboshi"	2021	Unknown	
"Shirogane"	2021	Unknown	
"Shifuku no Toki"	2022	Unknown	
"New Me"	2022	Unknown	
"Doyoubi no Watashitachi wa"	2022	Unknown	
"Issei no Kassai"	2022	Unknown	
"Hello World"	2024	Unknown	
"Shouted Serenade"	2024	Unknown	
"Hallucinate"	2024	Unknown	
"Black Box"	2024	Unknown	
"Make a miracle"	2024	Unknown	
"Queen"	2024	Unknown	
"Reawaker feat. Felix"	2025	Unknown	
"Shine in the Night"	2025	Unknown	
"DECOTORA15"	2026	Unknown	
"Patch Walk"	2026	Unknown	
"YES"	2026	Unknown	
"AzukiArai feat. MAISONdes, KenmochiHidefumi"	2026	Unknown	
