= Dawn (Lisa song) =

2021 song by Lisa

- Cover art for the regular and digital version

Single by Lisa

from the album Lander
- B-side: "Brand New You"
- Released: January 11, 2021
- Genre: J-pop, rock
- Length: 4:06
- Label: Sacra Music; Sony Music Japan

Lisa singles chronology
| "Saikai" (2020) | "Dawn" (2021) | "Hadashi no Step" (2021) |

Music video
- "Dawn" on YouTube

"Dawn" (stylized in all lowercase) is a song by Japanese singer Lisa. It is the singer's eighteenth single and includes "Brand New You" as B-side. The song was pre-released digitally on January 11, 2021, and physically two days later by Sacra Music and Sony Music Japan. It serves as the opening theme song of the anime Back Arrow (2020).

== Background and release ==
Lisa released "Homura" in October 2020, alongside her studio album Leo-Nine. Unlike its predecessor, "Gurenge", "Homura" served as the ending theme of the anime movie Demon Slayer: Kimetsu no Yaiba the Movie: Mugen Train (2020). It was commercially successful in Japan, reaching number one on both the Oricon Singles Chart and Japan Hot 100, and was eventually certified platinum by the Recording Industry Association of Japan. On December 12, 2020, "Dawn" was announced as the opening theme song of the anime series Back Arrow, that was released on January 8, 2021. The cover art was released on January 1. The single was released pre-released digitally on January 11, 2021, in conjunction with a music video, by Sacra Music and Sony Music Japan. The physical version was released two days later in only one regular edition, featuring "Dawn" as A-side and "Brand New You" as B-side.

== Music video ==
The music video for the song, premiered on Lisa's YouTube channel on January 11, 2021, and features Lisa performing on a stage while backed by a live band.

== Track listing ==
Digital download
| No. | Title | Length |
|---|---|---|
| 1. | "Dawn" | 4:06 |
| 2. | "Brand New You" | 3:44 |
| 3. | "Dawn (TV version)" | 1:33 |
| 4. | "Dawn (Instrumental)" | 4:06 |
| Total length: | | 13:00 |

== Charts ==
| Chart (2020) | Peak position |
|---|---|
| Japan (Japan Hot 100) | 11 |
| Japan (Oricon) | 5 |
