= Leo-Nine =

2020 album by Lisa

- Digital and regular edition cover

Studio album by Lisa
- Released: October 14, 2020
- Genre: J-pop
- Length: 54:02
- Language: Japanese
- Label: Sacra Music; Sony Music Japan
- Producer: Pablo; Ryo Eguchi; Koichiro Takahashi; Shota Horie

Lisa chronology
Little Devil Parade (2017)	Leo-Nine (2020)	Ladybug (2021)

Singles from Leo-Nine
- 1. "Akai Wana (Who Loves It?)/Adamas" Released: December 12, 2018; 2. "Gurenge" Released: July 3, 2019; 3. "Unlasting" Released: December 11, 2019; 4. "Aijō" Released: August 17, 2020

Leo-Nine (stylized as LEO-NiNE, all caps except the letter "i") is the fifth studio album by Japanese singer Lisa. It was released on October 14, 2020, through Sacra Music and Sony Music Japan. Leo-Nine marks the singer's first full-length project in over three years since Little Devil Parade (2017). Like Little Devil Parade, Leo-Nine features a wide range of contribution from composers and producers, including long-time collaborators Pablo (Pay Money to My Pain), Ryo Eguchi, Koichiro Takahashi, and Shota Horie. The album sold over 66,000 copies in its first week, reaching the number one spot on both Oricon Albums Chart and Billboard Japan's Hot Albums chart. Along with "Homura" debuting at number one on the Japan Hot 100, Lisa became the first artist ever to debut atop the Billboard Japan's charts simultaneously. The album has since received a gold certification from the Recording Industry Association of Japan (RIAJ).

Four singles were released prior to the release of the album, with the first single "Akai Wana (Who Loves It?) / Adamas" peaking at number two on the Oricon Singles Chart. "Gurenge" marked Lisa's most successful single in the territory, reaching number three on Oricon as well as number two on the Japan Hot 100, and sold over a million downloads in Japan. "Unlasting" peaked at number four on the Oricon chart and number six on the Hot 100.

== Background and release ==
Lisa released two compilation albums titled Lisa Best -Day- and Lisa Best -Way- on May 9, 2018. On August 12, 2020, the singer announced the release of her fifth studio album, Leo-Nine alongside a new single "Homura", which was slated to serve as the opening theme song of the anime movie Demon Slayer: Kimetsu no Yaiba the Movie: Mugen Train (2020). It follows her previous studio album Little Devil Parade released in May 2017, and marks her first full-length record in three years and five months. The track list was announced on September 2, 2020. The physical version was made available in four different editions: Regular Edition, Limited Edition, First Limited Edition A, and First Limited Edition B. The regular edition contained the album with 13 tracks. A limited CD+Blu-ray edition was offered with photo book. The album was also released under a First Press Limited Edition A, which comes with CD+Blu-ray disc and an exclusive booklet, while the First Press Limited Edition B contains a bonus DVD containing the jacket-shooting videos. The opening track from the album "Play the World!" featuring Lisa's long-time collaborator Pablo (Pay Money to My Pain), was pre-released on September 4. The track was later selected as the opening song of e-sports championship, Rainbow Six Japan Championship 2020. Leo-Nine was released on October 14, 2020, by Sacra Music and Sony Music Japan.

== Singles ==
The lead single "Akai Wana (Who Loves It?)/Adamas" was released as a double A-sided single on December 12, 2018. It was offered as the opening theme song of Sword Art Online: Alicization. It peaked at number two on the Oricon Singles Chart and number four on the Japan Hot 100. Additionally, it topped Billboard Japan's Hot Animation chart for two consecutive weeks. In April 2020, the single was certified platinum by the RIAJ, denoting sales of 250,000 copies.

"Gurenge" (紅蓮華; Red Lotus) was served as the second single, being released on July 3, 2019. It was used as the opening theme song of the anime series Demon Slayer: Kimetsu no Yaiba (2019). "Gurenge" was a commercial success in Japan, marking Lisa's most successful single. It reached number two on the Japan Hot 100 and number three on the Oricon Weekly Singles chart. Additionally, it topped the Animation chart 38 times during the tracking period of November 25, 2019 to November 22, 2020. "Gurenge" became the first single by a female artist to sell over one million digital copies in Japan, and the third single overall since Kenshi Yonezu's "Lemon" (2018) and "Uma to Shika" (2019). In July 2020, "Gurenge" was certified Million by the Recording Industry Association of Japan (RIAJ) for 1,000,000 full-track digital music downloads. The single was awarded as one of the Best 5 Songs by Download at the 34th Japan Gold Disc Awards.

"Unlasting" was released as album's third single on December 11, 2019. It served as the first ending theme song of the anime series Sword Art Online: Alicization – War of Underworld. The single reached number six on the Hot 100, and number four on Oricon's Weekly Chart.

"Aijō" (愛錠) was served as a promotional single from the album on August 17, 2020, receiving a lyric video. It was delivered as the theme song of the Japanese drama 13.

== Commercial performance ==
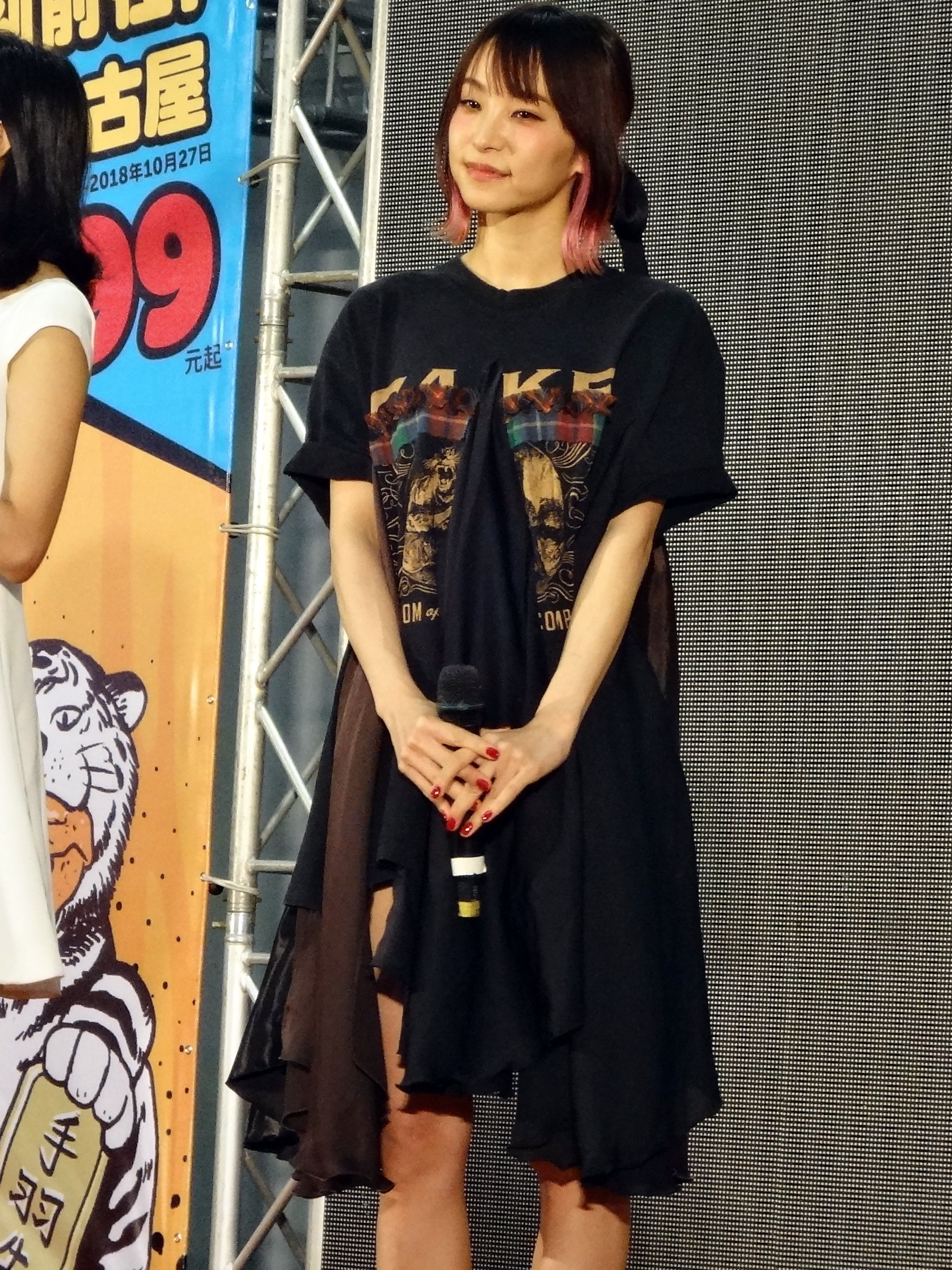
With "Homura" and Leo-Nine, Lisa (pictured) became the first ever artist to simultaneously debut a song and an album at number one on Billboard Japan's charts.

Leo-Nine debuted at number one on the Oricon Albums Chart on the chart issue dated October 20, 2020, selling 66,000 copies in its first week. The same week, Lisa also topped the Oricon Singles Chart with "Homura". By doing so, she became the first female artist in 16 years and 6 months to simultaneously debut a song and an album in Japan since Hikaru Utada. It reached number one on Billboard Japan's Daily Album Chart, pulling 41,451 copies in its first three days. It went on to chart at number one on the weekly Hot Albums chart, selling 66,165 copies in its opening week. With "Homura" simultaneously topping the Japan Hot 100, Lisa became the first act in history to have both a song and an album debut at number one on the chart. Leo-Nine has been certified gold by the RIAJ, denoting 100,000 copies sent to Japanese retailers.

== Track listing ==
Credits adapted from Billboard Japan.

CD
No.	Title	Lyrics	Music	Arrangement	Length
1.	"Play the World!" (featuring Pablo)	Lisa; Tomoya Tabuchi	Pablo	Pablo	4:18
2.	"Gurenge"	Lisa	Hana Kusano; Yoko Eguchi	Ryo Eguchi	3:57
3.	"Harebutai"	Lisa	Koichiro Takahashi	Koichiro Takahashi	4:59
4.	"Makoto Shiyaka"	Tomoya Tabuchi	Tomoya Tabuchi	Ryo Eguchi	3:50
5.	"Cancellation"	Lisa	Pablo	Pablo	4:11
6.	"Aijo"	Lisa	Kayoko Kusano	Ryo Eguchi	4:05
7.	"Akai Wana (Who Loves It?)"	Lisa; Tomoya Tabuchi	Tomoya Tabuchi	Shota Horie	4:12
8.	"Selfish Ket Sea"	Masato Kanai (BIGMAMA)	Masato Kanai (BIGMAMA)	Ryo Eguchi	4:11
9.	"Unlasting"	Lisa	Kayoko Kusano	Shota Horie	4:56
10.	"Adamas"	Lisa	Kayoko Kusano	Shota Horie	3:48
11.	"1 cm"	Lisa	Lisa; Shota Horie	Shota Horie	1:27
12.	"Howl"	Lisa	Hideo Nekota	Ryo Eguchi	4:53
13.	"Beautiful World"	Lisa	Yasuha Konan	Ryo Eguchi	5:12
Total length:					54:03

Bonus DVD (First Press Limited Edition)
No.	Title	Length
1.	"Play the World!" (music video)
2.	"Akai Wana (Who Loves It?)" (music video)
3.	"Adamas" (music video)
4.	"Gurenge" (music video)
5.	"Unlasting" (music video)
6.	"Aijo" (lyric video)
7.	"Howl" (music video)
8.	"Unlasting" (Lisa special live in AbemaTV)
9.	"Shirushi" (Lisa special live in AbemaTV)
10.	"Gurenge" (The First Take)
11.	"The Making of Leo-Nine"

== Charts ==
=== Weekly charts ===
Chart (2020)	Peak position
Japanese Albums (Oricon)	1
Japanese Hot Albums (Billboard Japan)	1
Japanese Top Albums (Billboard Japan)	1

=== Year-end charts ===
Chart (2020)	Position
Japanese Albums (Oricon)	27

== Certifications ==
Region	Certification	Certified units/sales
Japan (RIAJ)	Gold	100,000^{^}
^{^} Shipments figures based on certification alone.
