= Sword Art Online: Alicization =

- Season 3
- Promotional poster for Sword Art Online: Alicization
- No. of episodes: 47 (2 parts)

Release
- Original network: Tokyo MX
- Original release: October 7, 2018 – September 20, 2020

Season chronology
- ← Previous; Sword Art Online II

Sword Art Online: Alicization is the third season of the Sword Art Online anime television series based on the light novel series written by Reki Kawahara and illustrated by abec. It was produced by A-1 Pictures and directed by Manabu Ono. It covers the first part of the "Alicization" arc and adapts from the novel's ninth volume, Alicization Beginning, to the fourteenth volume, Alicization Uniting. The second part of the anime, titled Sword Art Online: Alicization – War of Underworld, adapts the story from the novel's fifteenth volume, Alicization Invading, to the eighteenth volume, Alicization Lasting. While not covered in the light novels, Alicization takes place after Sword Art Online the Movie: Ordinal Scale, as it incorporates elements from the film not found in the novels. (Note: Such as Asuna's ring given to her by Kirito in the film or Kirito's friends using the Augma, which was introduced in the film.)

The first part of the series premiered on October 7, 2018, and aired until March 31, 2019, with a one-hour world premiere airing in Japan, South Korea, the United States, Mexico, Australia, France, Germany, and Russia on September 15, 2018. The second part of the series premiered on October 13 and aired until December 29, 2019, with a recap episode summarizing the first part airing on October 6, 2019. The second half of the War of Underworld series was originally scheduled to premiere on April 26, 2020, but was delayed to air from July 12 to September 20, 2020, due to the COVID-19 pandemic. Aniplex of America's English-dubbed version aired on Adult Swim's Toonami programming block from February 10 until July 14, 2019, while the first cour of the second part of the series aired from January 19 until April 5, 2020. The second cour of the second part of the series premiered on Toonami on November 8, 2020. The series is available with multilingual subtitles on iQIYI in Southeast Asia.

== Music ==
The first opening theme of Sword Art Online: Alicization is "Adamas" by Lisa, and the first ending theme is "Iris" (アイリス) by Eir Aoi. The second opening theme is "Resister" by Asca, and the second ending theme is "Forget-me-not" by Reona, with episode 19 featuring "Niji no Kanata ni" (虹の彼方に, Beyond the Rainbow), also sung by Reona. In Sword Art Online: Alicization – War of Underworld, the first opening theme is "Resolution" by Haruka Tomatsu, and the first ending theme is "Unlasting" by Lisa. The second opening theme is "Anima" by Reona, and the second ending theme is "I will" by Eir Aoi. The series' music is composed by Yuki Kajiura.

== Episodes ==
=== Sword Art Online: Alicization (2018–19) ===
Story	Episode	Title (Note: All English titles are taken from Crunchyroll.)	Directed by	Written by	Original release date (Note: Tokyo MX lists the series as premiering at 24:00 on Saturday, which is effectively Sunday at 12:00 a.m. JST.)	English air date	Ref.
Story arc 4: Alicization
Part 1: Alicization Beginning
50	1	"Underworld"; Transliteration: "Andāwārudo" (Japanese: アンダーワールド)	Manabu Ono, Tsuyoshi Tobita	Yukito Kizawa	October 7, 2018 (Note: Sword Art Online: Alicization premiered with a special one-hour episode, with pre-screenings in several countries on September 15, 2018.)	February 10, 2019	
Inside an unknown VR environment, Kirito spends his days as a child with his friends Eugeo and Alice. The three get lost in a cave in the outskirts of the Human Territory, ending up at the boundary of the Dark Territory. Alice trips and falls with her hand accidentally touching the Dark Territory. For this violation, she is sentenced to execution by the Integrity Knights. Kirito attempts to stop Alice from being taken away, while Eugeo stands motionless. Soon after, Kirito awakens in the real world with no memory of what happened. Later in Gun Gale Online, Sinon, Kirito, Asuna, Silica, Lisbeth, and Klein confront a mysterious squad that flees after one of them is taken down. After the battle, Sinon thanks the others for joining her, and back in the real world, she invites Kirito and Asuna to join her in the upcoming BoB tournament. They agree, and Kirito reveals that he is working for the Rath Company as a tester for a new Full-Dive technology known as "Soul Translator", or STL. On their way home, Kirito and Asuna are attacked by Johnny Black, the final survivor of the Death Gun incident, who injects Kirito with a poison syringe.
51	2	"The Demon Tree"; Transliteration: "Akuma no Ki" (Japanese: 悪魔の樹)	Takashi Sakuma	Yukito Kizawa	October 14, 2018	February 17, 2019	
Kirito awakens back in Underworld, but he does not remember how he got there. He encounters Eugeo, but they have no memories of each other. After helping Eugeo with his daily task of chopping the Demon Tree, Kirito is taken to Eugeo's village, where he discovers that he can activate his sword skills from back in SAO. After finding shelter at the local church, Kirito decides that he must learn more about his circumstances before looking for a way to return to the real world.
52	3	"The End Mountains"; Transliteration: "Hate no Sanmyaku" (Japanese: 果ての山脈)	Shunsuke Ishikawa	Ko Nekota	October 21, 2018	February 24, 2019	
While chopping the Demon Tree, Eugeo explains to Kirito the reason why Alice was taken prisoner by the Integrity Knights. He also reveals the sword he retrieved from the End Mountains, and they attempt to cut the tree with it, but they discover that their skill levels are not yet high enough to use it. Later at night, Kirito has a conversation with Selka, Alice's younger sister, and reveals to her what he heard about Alice from Eugeo. The next day, Selka disappears and both Kirito and Eugeo realize that she must have gone to the End Mountains as well. In the mountains, they discover that Selka was captured by goblins. As the goblins prepare to attack Kirito and Eugeo, Eugeo becomes paralyzed by fear.
53	4	"Departure"; Transliteration: "Tabidachi" (Japanese: 旅立ち)	Michiru Itabisashi	Ko Nekota	October 28, 2018	March 3, 2019	
Kirito helps Eugeo regain his composure and they fight the goblins together. While facing the goblin leader, Eugeo is gravely wounded and both he and Kirito remember their past together. An enraged Kirito kills the goblin leader and convinces the others to retreat. After the battle, Kirito frees Selka and she uses her magic to transfer a part of Kirito's energy to Eugeo in order to save his life. During the transfer, Kirito has a vision of an unknown woman who tells him that she is waiting for him and Eugeo atop the Central Cathedral. After Eugeo recovers, Kirito, having gained enough skill points from the battle to use the sword from the End Mountains, deals a heavy blow to the Demon Tree, and Eugeo asks him to teach him swordsmanship. After completing his training, Eugeo uses the sword to finally cut down the Demon Tree, and the village holds a celebration for his feat. During the occasion, Eugeo is allowed to choose his next occupation, and he decides to become a swordsman. Kirito and Eugeo then depart for Central City, hoping to find Alice and bring her back home.
54	5	"Ocean Turtle"; Transliteration: "Ōshan Tātoru" (Japanese: オーシャン・タートル)	Kōji Kobayashi	Yukito Kizawa	November 4, 2018	March 10, 2019	
After being poisoned by Johnny Black, Kirito is taken to a hospital. After treating him, the doctors inform Asuna and Kirito's family that he is stable, but unconscious, and it is unknown when, or if, he will ever wake up. Kikuoka then approaches them, offering to transfer Kirito to a better facility, but when Asuna and Suguha pay a visit to him there, they are prevented from seeing him. With help from Yui and the rest of her friends, Asuna tracks down Kirito all the way to the port, and discovers that he must have been taken somewhere abroad. After learning that the Soul Translator was a technology developed by Akihiko Kayaba, Asuna contacts Rinko Koujiro, Kayaba's former lover and co-researcher. Some time later, accompanied by her secretary, Mayumi Reynolds, Rinko is taken to the "Ocean Turtle", an offshore research facility where she is welcomed by Kikuoka. After passing numerous security checks, Mayumi, revealing herself as Asuna in disguise, asks Kikuoka where Kirito is.
55	6	"Project Alicization"; Transliteration: "Arishiazēshon Keikaku" (Japanese: アリシアゼーション計画)	Hiroki Hirano	Yukito Kizawa	November 11, 2018	March 24, 2019 (Note: The English dub of episode 6 of Alicization originally aired on March 17, but due to a broadcast error six minutes into the episode that caused it to freeze, it had to be skipped to the first half of episode 12 of Megalobox. The full uninterrupted episode was uploaded hours later on Adult Swim's website. Toonami re-aired the episode on March 24, pushing back episode 7 for a back-to-back airing with episode 8 the following week on March 31.)	
Kikuoka explains to Asuna and Rinko that Kirito's brain was severely damaged from the attack and they are using the STL technology to restore it. He also reveals that the main focus of the Underworld experiment is to create a new, more advanced form of artificial intelligence. Despite the experiment having proven successful, they note that by establishing the Church of Axiom inside Underworld, the AIs have managed to completely eliminate all kind of transgressions, including murder, from their community, and that they needed someone with years of experience in VRMMORPGs like Kirito to interact with them to develop them further. Asuna deduces that Kikuoka's objective is to create AIs capable of murder for military purposes, and he confesses that all of his actions since the development of the NerveGear was created for the sake of this research, labeled "Project Alicization". After checking on Kirito and informing her friends, Asuna is approached by Rinko, who formally apologizes for helping Kayaba during the SAO incident. Asuna replies that, while Kayaba can't be forgiven, she is thankful for the days she spent with Kirito inside Aincrad.
56	7	"Swordcraft Academy"; Transliteration: "Ken no Manabiya" (Japanese: 剣の学び舎)	Shunsuke Ishikawa	Ko Nekota	November 18, 2018	March 31, 2019	
Two years later, Kirito and Eugeo are now trainees at the North Centoria Imperial Sword Mastery Academy. The duo reflects on how they won in a swordsmanship tournament at the northern town of Zakkaria, then afterwards gained the requirement to enroll themselves into the academy. Their plan is to graduate from the academy as top students and become Integrity Knights, allowing them access to Central Cathedral. Kirito spars with his mentor, Elite Swordswoman Sortiliena Serlut. Sortiliena laments that her sword skills are still unrefined, and asks Kirito to show her everything from his Aincrad style before her graduation. Kirito and Eugeo visit the garden to look at the zephyr flowers which Kirito is attempting to grow. Eugeo anxiously asks Kirito whether he will return to his homeland if he regains his memories, but Kirito assures him that they will stick together to the end. The next day, Kirito receives a black sword made from a branch of Gigas Cedar. While practicing with his new sword, Kirito accidentally slips and stains the uniform of Elite Swordsman First Seat Volo Levinteinn. Volo forgives the fact that Kirito is training on a rest day, but he points out the stain as an excuse to invite Kirito to spar as a "punishment".
57	8	"Swordsman's Pride"; Transliteration: "Kenshi no Kyōji" (Japanese: 剣士の矜持)	Shigeki Kawai	Yukito Kizawa	November 25, 2018	March 31, 2019	
Before the duel, Sortiliena warns Kirito that the secret of the Levinteinn family's power is imbuing their sword with the blood of their enemies, thus Volo's request for a match with real swords. During the duel, Kirito manages to increase the power of his sword and scratches Volo's shirt before the match is interrupted by one of the instructors and declared a draw. Later at night, Kirito discovers that the zephyr flowers he was growing were destroyed by two classmates with a grudge against him. As he laments, he is instructed by a voice to use healing arts to transfer life energy from the other flowers in the garden to restore them. The next day, having learned from Kirito's match, Sortiliena defeats Volo in combat and graduates as First Seat, and Kirito presents her with the zephyr flowers as a parting gift. Later, Kirito and Eugeo are promoted to Elite Swordsmen.
58	9	"Nobleman's Responsibilities"; Transliteration: "Kizoku no Sekimu" (Japanese: 貴族の責務)	Michiru Itabisashi	Munemasa Nakamoto, Yukito Kizawa	December 2, 2018	April 7, 2019	
Eugeo and Kirito are now elite students of the academy. Humbert Zizek, Second seat among the elite students, challenges Eugeo to a duel which ends in a draw. Some days later, Kirito and Eugeo have a picnic with their pages, Ronye Arabel and Tiese Shtolienen. Ronye and Tiese reveal that a fellow student, Humbert's page Frenica Szeski, is being abused by Humbert. Kirito and Eugeo confront Humbert and his classmate, Raios Antinous, who do not deny the accusations, but claim that they did not violate any rule. While alone with Eugeo, Tiese expresses her despair about someday being forced to marry a person like Humbert, and Eugeo comforts her.
59	10	"Taboo Index"; Transliteration: "Kinki Mokuroku" (Japanese: 禁忌目録)	Shunsuke Nakashige	Munemasa Nakamoto	December 9, 2018	April 7, 2019	
Eugeo and Kirito realize that their pages are missing and Kirito leaves to look for them. Soon after, Frenica approaches Eugeo and informs him that the pages intend to confront Humbert for her sake, to stop his abuse of her. Eugeo storms Raios and Humbert's room, where he finds Ronye and Tiese gagged and tied up on a bed. Knowing that the taboo code prevents Eugeo from interfering, Raios and Humbert prepare to rape the girls in front of him, until Eugeo decides to violate the code and cuts off Humbert's arm. In the process of violating the code, Eugeo has to fight against the seal in his right eye, which causes his eye to be destroyed. Raios attempts to execute Eugeo but Kirito arrives and defends him. Kirito fights Raios, cutting off his arms, which leads to him glitching to death, while Humbert escapes. After the incident, an instructor restores Eugeo's eye. The next day both Kirito and Eugeo are handed over to an Integrity Knight and are surprised to discover the knight is none other than Alice.
60	11	"Central Cathedral"; Transliteration: "Sentoraru Kasedoraru" (Japanese: セントラル・カセドラル)	Satoshi Saga	Munemasa Nakamoto	December 16, 2018	April 14, 2019	
Eugeo is certain that the knight in front of them is Alice, but she does not recognize him or Kirito and takes them into custody. Kirito and Eugeo break out from the prison using their high object control authority and proceed to the Central Cathedral, but Alice, having predicted their move, sends another Integrity Knight to intercept them. In the real world, Asuna is introduced to the first prototype of an AI robot that is being developed at the Ocean Turtle.
61	12	"The Sage of the Library"; Transliteration: "Tosho-shitsu no Kenja" (Japanese: 図書室の賢者)	Tsuyoshi Tobita	Munemasa Nakamoto, Yukito Kizawa	December 23, 2018	April 21, 2019	
Eugeo and Kirito face off against an Integrity Knight named Eldrie after they run away from prison. Kirito and Eldrie start fighting but soon it is revealed that Eldrie has a Divine Weapon. Eugeo remembers who Eldrie really is; when Eugeo starts listing off different things the Knight has done, Eldrie starts screaming, saying that he has no such recollection of those memories. He then falls to the ground, and an unknown purple crystal emerges from his forehead. When Eugeo tells Eldrie his mother's name, he starts crying, then another Integrity Knight comes and attacks Kirito and Eugeo. They both run towards a dead end, where a warp gate appears in front of them, taking them to a grand library. The woman who teleported them turns out to be the Cardinal System of that world, and knows that Kirito is from the real world. She then goes on to explain the history of the VR world and who developed and created the Taboo Index.
62	13	"Ruler and Mediator"; Transliteration: "Shihai-sha to Chōtei-sha" (Japanese: 支配者と調停者)	Hiroshi Kimura	Munemasa Nakamoto, Yukito Kizawa	January 6, 2019	April 28, 2019	
A flashback occurs to when the Administrator is losing her own memory space, and so gets a child to link their memory. But this was a fatal mistake of the Administrator, because this means the child gets the same authority and power. This comes to the attention of the child (which is now to be revealed as the cardinal of the great library) and so, she attacks the Administrator. She flees to the one out of two places the Administrator doesn't have authority over, the great library. She spends the last 200 years thinking of a way to defeat the Administrator and finds Kirito and Eugeo in the process. She also explains how to get the Integrity Knight's memory back. Thus, the Cardinal allies with Kirito and Eugeo to defeat the administrator and get back Alice.
Part 2: Alicization Rising
63	14	"The Crimson Knight"; Transliteration: "Guren no Kishi" (Japanese: 紅蓮の騎士)	Shunsuke Ishikawa	Munemasa Nakamoto	January 13, 2019	May 5, 2019	
Back to the Cathedral, Kirito and Eugeo retrieve their swords, just before being attacked by Deusolbert, one of the Integrity Knights. After defeating the knight with Kirito's help, Eugeo recognizes him as the same knight who took Alice into custody eight years ago, and they discover that his memories prior to this event were erased by the administrator as well. Recognizing their prowess, Deusolbert reveals that multiple Integrity Knights are waiting for them at the Cathedral's 50th floor with orders to kill them at sight. On the way there, Kirito and Eugeo discuss a strategy to deal with the knights when two young girls appear before them.
64	15	"The Relentless Knight"; Transliteration: "Retsujitsu no Kishi" (Japanese: 烈日の騎士)	Hirotaka Tokuda	Munemasa Nakamoto	January 20, 2019	May 12, 2019	
The two girls introduce themselves as Linel and Fizel, two novices studying at the cathedral, but just as they approach Kirito and Eugeo, they stab them with poisoned daggers, revealing themselves as Integrity Knights. To prove their value to the other Knights, Linel and Fizel carry the immobilized Kirito and Eugeo all the way to the 50th floor, where Fanatio, vice-commander of the Integrity Knights, awaits them. Upon arriving there, Kirito, revealing that he saw through their scheme and had taken measures to protect himself, uses the same daggers to restrain them, and confronts Fanatio alone until Eugeo recovers. Eugeo then uses his "Perfect Weapon Control Arts" to immobilize the knights.
65	16	"The Osmanthus Knight"; Transliteration: "Kinmokusei no Kishi" (Japanese: 金木犀の騎士)	Saori Den	Munemasa Nakamoto	January 27, 2019	May 19, 2019	
With Eugeo's help, Kirito defeats Fanatio, leaving her critically wounded. To save her, Kirito uses one of the special daggers Cardinal entrusted to them, despite Cardinal's instruction to save the weapons for Alice and the Administrator. With Fanatio under Cardinal's care, the two take an elevator to the 80th floor, where Alice awaits them. Kirito confronts Alice to give Eugeo a chance to use the dagger on her, but amidst the battle, a hole is opened in the exterior wall and both Kirito and Alice get sucked through it, much to Eugeo's despair.
66	17	"Truce"; Transliteration: "Kyūsen Kyōtei" (Japanese: 休戦協定)	Michiru Itabisashi	Yukito Kizawa	February 3, 2019	May 26, 2019	
With Kirito and Alice dangling along the wall of the church, Alice reluctantly agrees to work with Kirito to climb up to floor 95 where they can re-enter. Kirito attempts to tell Alice about her true past and the truth about Administrator. After climbing up for a while, they encounter minions from Dark Territory who have been posing as statues along the higher levels. Kirito and Alice fight together to defeat them. Meanwhile, Eugeo proceeds up the church until he reaches a great bath on floor 90 and encounters Bercouli Synthesis One.
67	18	"The Legendary Hero"; Transliteration: "Densetsu no Eiyū" (Japanese: 伝説の英雄)	Ken Takahashi	Yukito Kizawa	February 10, 2019	June 2, 2019	
Eugeo confronts Bercouli Synthesis One and traps them both in ice using the Blue Rose Sword's full memory release. Eugeo activates the secondary effect of the sword which drains the life of all objects trapped within its ice. With Eugeo betting he has more life than Bercouli, he tries to explain to Bercouli he was brainwashed by Administrator and begs him to remember the Blue Rose Sword, only to discover it was Bercouli who slayed the dragon in the cave. Suddenly, Prime Senator Chudelkin appears, petrifying Bercouli and capturing Eugeo. Meanwhile, Kirito and Alice take a rest before they continue climbing the wall, and Kirito convinces Alice to listen to his story, including the truth behind her past.
68	19	"The Seal of the Right Eye"; Transliteration: "Migime no Fūin" (Japanese: 右目の封印)	Shunsuke Ishikawa	Yukito Kizawa	February 24, 2019	June 9, 2019	
As Kirito explains the truth of the Underworld to Alice, and the truth behind Administrator and the Integrity Knights, Alice is convinced that Kirito is telling the truth. With Alice now strongly suspicious of the Axiom Church, she vows to reject its authority, only to be stopped by the seal in her right eye. Alice struggles to finish her sentence, but by force of will manages to yell out the remainder of her sentence, causing her right eye to explode before she passes out. Meanwhile, Eugeo wakes up to find himself on the 100th floor. Before he can attack Administrator, she awakens and puts Eugeo into a suggestive state and tricks him into dropping the protection of his Fluctlight's core.
69	20	"Synthesis"; Transliteration: "Shinsesaizu" (Japanese: シンセサイズ)	Satoshi Saga, Takuma Suzuki	Yukito Kizawa	March 3, 2019	June 16, 2019	
Alice wakes up to find herself carried up to floor 95. Kirito initiates a tracking spell to locate Eugeo's sword, finding it in a frozen bath hall on floor 90, but Eugeo is nowhere to be seen. To Alice's horror, she finds Bercouli in a petrified state and begins to cry. Bercouli momentarily wakes up and praises Alice for her ability to break the seal in her eye and pushes her to move forward with Kirito. Both Alice and Kirito proceed towards floor 100, crossing into a forbidden room meant for the Senators of the church, where they discover several humanoid figures. Once human, they are now trapped in pods, unable to move, and fed through tubes. Disgusted by the Pontifex's manipulation, Alice and Kirito encounter Prime Senator Chudelkin, but he escapes. They chase him to a dead end on floor 99, and Eugeo Synthesis 32 descends from a hole in the ceiling leading to the 100th floor.
Part 3: Alicization Uniting
70	21	"The 32nd Knight"; Transliteration: "San jū ni-banme no kishi" (Japanese: 三十二番目の騎士)	Shunsuke Nakashige	Yukito Kizawa	March 10, 2019	June 23, 2019	
With Alice watching, Kirito and Eugeo begin fighting with one another. During the fight Kirito tries to snap Eugeo out of his synthesized personality. Eventually during the fight, due to the synthesis ritual having been rushed and no memories removed, Eugeo manages to regain control of his mind. He freezes both Alice and Kirito with the Blue Rose Sword and heads up to kill Administrator. Eugeo, pretending to still be under the influence of the piety module, allows Administrator to put him in a dazed state and to remove the module. While Chudelkin goes to inspect the results of the battle, Administrator attempts to resynthesize Eugeo, but fails. Eugeo attempts to pierce Administrator only to hit a defensive shield. Metal cannot pierce her skin. Chudelkin gets ambushed by Kirito and Alice and the two force their way up to Administrator's room. The three fight Chudelkin, but he proves to be extremely skilled with the sacred arts, as he summons a fire element monster resembling himself, which he calls the Genie.
71	22	"Titan of the Sword"; Transliteration: "Ken no Kyojin" (Japanese: 剣の巨人)	Hiroshi Kimura	Munemasa Nakamoto	March 17, 2019	June 30, 2019	
Kirito, Alice, and Eugeo find themselves overwhelmed by the Genie until Kirito attacks Chudelkin directly. Chudelkin is swiftly defeated by Kirito after a sudden spike in his power through the incarnate arts, which temporarily changed his garments to those of his Aincrad days. This allows Administrator to understand Kirito is not from Underworld, but outside the virtual reality. After some conversation, Administrator summons a creature made of swords, which she calls Sword Golem. Kirito, Alice, and Eugeo find themselves unable to fight against it until Charlotte, the observation unit from Cardinal, changes into a giant spider and holds off the Golem. Eugeo is given instructions to stab the dagger into the hole in the floor. After doing as instructed, a portal opens and Cardinal appears and incapacitates the Golem with a lightning strike, heals Kirito and Alice, and mourns Charlotte's death.
72	23	"Administrator"; Transliteration: "Adominisutorēta" (Japanese: アドミニストレータ)	Hirotaka Tokuda, Yūsuke Maruyama, Michiru Itabisashi	Yukito Kizawa	March 24, 2019	July 7, 2019	
With the appearance of Cardinal, Administrator severs the outside link to the world and places floor 100 of the Axiom church into a dark void. Administrator explains that the source of all the divine swords that make up the Golem are from converted human units in the human empire, and the source of its life is the Piety module. Her plan to combat the Dark Territory is to create more Sword Golems from roughly half of the human empire's population. Cardinal proposes to make a deal with Administrator: Cardinal's life for the freedom of Kirito, Alice, and Eugeo. Administrator accepts and begins to relentlessly strike Cardinal with lightning. Shortly before her death, Cardinal grants Eugeo his wish to be fused into his sword. With Eugeo now in the form of a sword, he shatters the Golem's Piety module, attacks Administrator and cuts off her arm, but Administrator breaks Eugeo in half.
73	24	"My Hero"; Transliteration: "Boku no Eiyū" (Japanese: ぼくの英雄)	Takashi Sakuma, Manabu Ono	Yukito Kizawa	March 31, 2019	July 14, 2019	
With Eugeo dying and Alice unconscious, Kirito fights against Administrator alone. She shocks him by using SAO Sword Skills, stating there is nothing about the system she does not know. The bisected, but human, Eugeo begs him to stand and uses his remaining life and blood to temporarily reform the Blue Rose Sword, which is made of crystal. Dual-wielding, Kirito loses his right arm but cuts off Administrator's remaining arm and deals critical damage. Administrator decides to exit the Underworld and summons the system console, but Chudelkin suddenly regains consciousness and latches on to Administrator, begging her to not leave him. With lingering fire elements still active, Chudelkin and Administrator catch fire, killing them both. Eugeo says his goodbye to Kirito and dies with young Alice's memory. Kirito walks over to the system console and initiates a communication line to the real world where he discovers the Ocean Turtle is under attack. Kikuoka instructs Kirito to take Alice to the World's End Altar in the Dark Territory before getting cut off. Kirito then loses consciousness from Fluctlight damage as the attackers shut the power off at Rath, causing a surge that strikes his comatose body.

=== Sword Art Online: Alicization – War of Underworld (2019–20) ===
Story	Episode	Title	Directed by	Written by	Original release date	English airdate	Ref.
Part 4: Alicization Invading
74	25	"In the Far North"; Transliteration: "Kita no Ji Nite" (Japanese: 北の地にて)	Takashi Sakuma	Munemasa Nakamoto	October 13, 2019 (Note: The first 2 episodes were screened on October 6, 2019 at Madman Anime Festival Perth, Australia, and at Anime Fest @ NYCC in New York City, United States.)	January 19, 2020	
A few months have passed since the fall of Administrator, and Alice, fearful for Kirito, who is in a catatonic state due to the energy surge in the Ocean Turtle sustained during the facility attack, takes him back to Rulid Village by riding Amayori, her dragon companion. However, because she is still deemed a criminal, she is not allowed to live within the village and decides to build a log cabin outside of Rulid, to settle in with Kirito. She looks after him every day, and is regularly visited by Selka, her younger sister, while also frequently being employed to cut down trees by Barbossa, a self-centered landowner who looks down on Alice. Meanwhile, the Integrity Knights learn of the Administrator's plan to convert half of the Human Empire into mindless, sword-shaped weapons to defend against the Dark Territory. Alice is visited by Eldrie Synthesis 31, who offers to execute Kirito so Alice can return to the Integrity Knights. Alice refuses, forcing Eldrie to leave. That night, Kirito wakes in a panic. Though still suffering from fluctlight damage, he has sensed danger in Rulid, and Alice spots an orange glow and smoke coming from Rulid.
75	26	"Raids"; Transliteration: "Shuugeki" (Japanese: 襲撃)	Takehiro Miura	Munemasa Nakamoto	October 20, 2019	January 26, 2020	
With Rulid under attack by goblins and orcs, Alice quickly equips her armor, but conceals it beneath her clothes and flies to the village on Amayori. She finds a small group of villagers attempting fight off the goblins while the remaining villagers stand back preparing to mount a defence. Alice attempts to evacuate them, but they refuse to defy the orders of the guards of the village. Left with no choice, Alice reveals to the villagers her identity as an Integrity Knight and orders the villagers to evacuate, much to Barbossa's disgust. With newfound determination, her eye regenerates by force of will and she swiftly defeats the invasion. Meanwhile, in the real world, Gabriel Miller and his team approach Rath on a submarine. He and his invasion force have taken control of the main control room of Ocean Turtle but are currently locked out. Asuna, Kikuoka, and the remaining staff at Rath get a reading on their current situation and decide their next course of action is to retake control of Ocean Turtle and prevent A.L.I.C.E from falling into enemy hands.
76	27	"The Final Load Test"; Transliteration: "Saishū Fuka Jikken" (Japanese: 最終負荷実験)	Hiroshi Kimura	Munemasa Nakamoto	October 27, 2019	February 2, 2020	
With GlowGen Defense Systems now in control of the main control room, they find that the computer system is locked down tight and that forcing their way into the sub control room or the lightcube cluster is not a viable option. Commander Gabriel Miller flashes back to his login session in GGO where his team battled against Kirito. Gabriel logs out of his session to find himself back at his office at Glowgen Defense Systems, where he serves as CTO. He accepts an assignment from the US government to seize the STL and the lightcube cluster. Back in the present, Gabriel discovers the existence of the final load test getting ready to commence, which will eliminate the border between the Human and Dark territories to test the humans. In order to accomplish his mission of locating Alice, he decides to log in as the Dark Emperor Vector, with his lieutenant, Vassago, logging in as a dark knight. Meanwhile, Asuna decides to log in to the Underworld in an attempt to save Kirito and escort Alice out of the Underworld. Back in Tokyo, Sinon wakes up from a dream of her experience in GGO 4. The competition was left down to two people, her and Subtilizer (Gabriel), where Subitilizer easily takes her out with his bare hands, leaving her with the message "Your soul will be so sweet" and choking her to death.
77	28	"Dark Territory"; Transliteration: "Dāku Teritorī" (Japanese: ダークテリトリー)	Naomi Nakayama, Takashi Sakuma	Yukito Kizawa	November 3, 2019	February 9, 2020	
During the dive into the Underworld, Gabriel Miller briefly flashes back to his childhood obsession with souls. After logging in with the super-account representing the Dark Emperor Vector, he quickly gains control of the army of the Dark Territory. General Shasta, being less than pleased with the Emperor's plans, confides in his top soldier and lover, Lipia, that the Emperor must be killed to keep the peace. Vector communicates with his soldiers in the real world and retires to his bedroom, greeted by Lipia. Disguised as a concubine, Lipia attacks him with a hidden knife, but Vector quickly subdues her and chokes her to death, watching her glowing soul leave her body. He flashes back to his childhood obsession with souls and his fixation on his friend named Alicia. Convinced her soul must be hidden deep beneath her brain matter, he jammed a long needle into her ear. As she died, he saw a glittering glow leave her body and ascend into the sky. In the Underworld, Vector addresses his legion of soldiers and presents Lipia's head frozen in ice as a warning to any who would challenge him. Shocked at the death of his lover, Shasta tries to kill Vector and unleashes a storm of incarnation, nearly wiping out the leaders of each respective army. As he aims for Vector, he is sucked into a void in his soul and disappears, leaving Vector unfazed. Meanwhile, in the human empire, Alice and Kirito arrive in the eastern camp near the Eastern Gate. Alice discovers that the gate is going to fall in a matter of days, removing the barrier between the Dark Territory and the Human Empire.
78	29	"The Night Before Battle"; Transliteration: "Kaisen Zenya" (Japanese: 開戦前夜)	Chiku Onoue	Yukito Kizawa	November 10, 2019	February 16, 2020	
Alice and Kirito have arrived at the military camp outside of the eastern corridor, with Alice being wary of Kirito's safety. Alice and the other Integrity Knights work to come up with a plan to combat the army of the Dark Territory. Meanwhile, Ronie and Tiese learn about Eugeo's fate and Kirito's condition, and are entrusted to care for him. With the gate just about to fall, everyone prepares for battle.
Part 5: Alicization Exploding
79	30	"Battle of the Knights"; Transliteration: "Kishi-tachi no Tatakai" (Japanese: 騎士たちの戦い)	Takuma Suzuki	Yukito Kizawa	November 17, 2019	February 23, 2020	
With the gate having fallen, the Dark Territory army proceed to storm into the Human Empire, with a variety of tactics. Standing in front for the Human Empire army are Deuselbert Synthesis 7, Fanatio Synthesis 2 and Eldrie Synthesis 31. Standing further back is Bercouli Synthesis 1 with his Time-Splitting Sword on standby, Sheyta Synthesis 12 and the cowardly Renly Synthesis 27. As enemies and allies are being killed, among them a member of the Four Whirling Blades, Alice, hiding up in the shadows, is collecting the sacred power being released from the corpses to build up a laser bomb made of sacred art. Meanwhile, in a panic, Renly runs away and hides leaving one of the rear lines without a commander.
80	31	"Stigma of the Disqualified"; Transliteration: "Shikkaku-sha no Rakuin" (Japanese: 失格者の烙印)	Hideya Ito	Kohei Urushibara	November 24, 2019	March 1, 2020	
With the war continuing on, Alice continues to build the laser bomb using the spatial resources given off by the corpses. Meanwhile, Renly is hiding in a supply tent, only to be found by Ronie and Tiese. Shortly after, they discover the Mountain Goblins have broken through the lines and are attacking the supply lines. With Linel and Fizel swiftly killing the invading goblins, Renly finds the courage to fight and activates his Double-Winged Blade's perfect weapon control. Dee Eye Ill, chancellor of the dark mages, sends in every minion she has to attack from the sky, only for Bercouli's Time-Splitting Sword to take them all out at once. With a significant number of Dark Territory soldiers killed, the dark mages prepare to unleash a sacred art to attack the rear lines, only for the magic to fizzle out. Alice then unleashes the bomb she was building and wipes out a significant chunk of Dark Territory soldiers, causing the momentum to shift towards the soldiers of the human empire.
81	32	"Blood and Life"; Transliteration: "Chi to Inochi" (Japanese: 血と命)	Shunsuke Nakashige	Munemasa Nakamoto	December 1, 2019	March 8, 2020	
After, having unleashed the laser bomb, Alice finds the chief of the Ogres, Furgr, still alive, and is attacked. Alice quickly defeats Furgr. Having figured out that Vector is after Alice, the human army create a decoy force, consisting of Renly, Bercouli, Alice, Sheyta, Kirito, Ronie, Tiese, 1000 human volunteer soldiers, 200 priests, and 4 dragons, and head out to the Dark Territory to draw the dark army away from the corridor of the human empire. With the dark mages having figured out why their art failed, Dee Eye Ill sacrifices orcs to generate more spatial resources and allow them to cast their dark art, with Emperor Vector's approval. As the decoy force move out, the dark mages cast an art to create a swarm of deadly insects and send them in to the human empire. With no way to defend, Eldrie sacrifices himself and uses himself to shield everyone from the art. Revenge driven Alice then takes out the entire Mage unit on her own.
82	33	"Sword and Fist"; Transliteration: "Ken to Ken" (Japanese: 剣と拳)	Hiroshi Kimura	Kohei Urushibara	December 8, 2019	March 15, 2020	
With the decoy force heading through the dark territory towards the World's End Altar, Emperor Vector orders the Pugilists and the Dark Knights to pursue. Sheyta Synthesis 12, otherwise known as Sheyta the Silent, considers herself to be cursed with the ability to cut anything she touches, no matter how hard the object is. Iskahn, leader of the Pugilist Guild, considers himself to be uncuttable by any object imaginable. During the pursuit the Pugilists catch up with the decoy force, and Sheyta stays back to hold them off. She goes up against Iskahn and a hard battle ensues with Sheyta wounding Iskahn with her paper thin sword. With a drawn out stalemate, both fighters gain a mutual respect for each other and she withdraws back to the decoy force. At the end of the first day's haul, the decoy force setup camp to rest. Unknown to them, Vassago has been lurking and secretly takes out a few men in the camp. When he spots Ronie and Tiese as his next target, the Goddess of Creation, Stacia, descends from the sky and protects them. However, just before he got swallowed by the ravine, Vassago recognized Asuna in the glowing light.
83	34	"Stacia, the Goddess of Creation"; Transliteration: "Sōsei Shin Suteishia" (Japanese: 創世神ステイシア)	Takashi Sakuma	Kohei Urushibara	December 15, 2019	March 22, 2020	
After Stacia (Asuna) created 3 ravines to swallow up Vassago, and his knights, as well as to cut off the Pugilists and the remaining Dark Knights from the decoy force, she descends and introduces herself as Asuna to the somewhat intimidated force. Due to her fluctlight being overloaded from the terrain change, Asuna experiences a headache and remembers that repeated use of the ability can cause damage to her fluctlight. After formalities, she proceeds to visit Kirito's tent. Upon seeing him, she is filled with tearful joy. Hearing Asuna's voice, Kirito is clearly shocked. Even in a state of catatonic, he attempts to reach out to her, with a face full of tears, Asuna responds with a long-awaited hug. Shortly after, Alice appears and interferes with their reunion. They meetup to discuss what the enemy is after. Later in the night, Ronie, Alice, Asuna, and Sortiliena share Kirito stories with each other.
Part 6: Alicization Awakening
84	35	"Heartless Choice"; Transliteration: "Hijō no Sentaku" (Japanese: 非情の選択)	Akira Yamada	Munemasa Nakamoto	December 22, 2019	March 29, 2020	
The following morning, the decoy force discovers that Vector has ordered the army to traverse the massive ravine by crawling over 10 suspended ropes, and plans a counter-strategy. Meanwhile, in the Ocean Turtle, Critter successfully disables the fluctlight acceleration and deploys a patch program to invite AmuSphere users in America to a PvP slaughter VRMMO, tricking them into thinking that it was a "beta test". At the same time, Yui sees their strategy and warns Kirito and Asuna's friends. Leafa and Sinon enter the STL at Rath's Roppongi base, and Lisbeth goes into ALO to try to convince the Japanese players to help the Underworld against the American players. Critter deploys 20,000 American players on the other side of the massive ravine.
85	36	"Ray of Light"; Transliteration: "Hitosuji no Hikari" (Japanese: 一筋の光)	Kenji Seto, Shunsuke Nakashige	Munemasa Nakamoto	December 29, 2019	April 5, 2020	
20,000 American players dive into the Underworld and begin to relentlessly slaughter everyone from both armies. Asuna, Alice, Bercouli, Renly, and Sheyta work to combat the American players. Dark Lord Vector spots Alice and commandeers a Dark Knight's dragon and flies towards her. Iskahn is infuriated at the sight of his forces being mercilessly slaughtered, the system preventing him from ordering them to defend themselves. Fighting against the Code 871 seal, he pulls his own right eye out and destroys it. Filled with burning rage and determination, Iskhan jumps across the ravine, with help from his second in command. Iskahn makes a deal with Asuna to fight with the humans if she builds a bridge for the Pugilists to cross. Alice, attempting to gain a tactical advantage, pulls ahead of the rest of the knights, but finds herself captured and subdued by the mounted Vector. He flies towards the World's End Altar, with Bercouli giving chase on dragonback. While the Pugilists and the Dark Knights remain to fight off the Americans, the decoy force pursues Vector. Back in the real world, Critter prepares to deploy another 20,000 American players to surround the decoy force. Vassago decides to dive in again on a "special" account. Back in the Underworld, the Americans spawn around the decoy force, when a bright light appears in the sky. Sinon, using the superaccount of Solus the Sun Goddess, reveals herself and destroys the Americans.
86	37	"The War of Underworld"; Transliteration: "Andāwārudo Taisen" (Japanese: アンダーワールド大戦)	Manabu Ono	Kohei Urushibara	July 12, 2020	November 8, 2020	
Sinon, having logged in as Solus the Sun Goddess, descends and reunites with Asuna and a still-catatonic Kirito. Asuna asks Sinon to go after Vector while she prepares a counterattack against the remaining Americans. Meanwhile, Leafa also descends to the underworld as Terraria the Earth Goddess and meets Lilpilin, the Orc Chieftain. After establishing a rapport, Leafa allows Lilpilin to take her to Dark Lord Vector as a prisoner. The Dark Mage Leader Dee Eye Ell, having survived Alice's attack, appears and knocks Lilpilin away. She begins to consume Leafa's avatar's energy. Lilpilin overcomes his Code 871 restriction and acts on his own to save Leafa. Leafa disarms and destroys Dee Eye Ell. Far to the south, Bercouli Synthesis One pursues Vector on dragonback, and uses his secret skill, Uragiri, to ground Vector's dragon. Bercouli engages Vector in battle but is overwhelmed by Vector's super account stats and stun powers. Realizing he cannot win against Vector, Bercouli resolves to die fighting for Alice's sake. Back at the ruins, the American players are ambushed, and Asuna joins the battle. Vassago returns to the game in a new avatar, stalking Asuna from afar. A bright light appears in the sky. The new arrival reveals himself to be Klein, in his ALO avatar. More allies begin to arrive from outside the Underworld.
87	38	"End to Eternity"; Transliteration: "Mugen no Hate" (Japanese: 無限の果て)	Toru Hamasaki	Kohei Urushibara	July 19, 2020	November 15, 2020	
Agil, Lisbeth and Silica also arrive to assist Asuna, accompanied by hundreds of players from ALO who responded to Yui's request for help. Meanwhile, at the Ocean Turtle, Higa comes up with a way to restore Kirito's Fluctlight with help from his friends, but must gain access the main control room occupied by the attackers. Bercoulli is mortally wounded by Vector, but manages to defeat him before dying. Soon after, Alice awakens beside Bercoulli's body. As his soul passes away, he asks for Fanatio to take care of their unborn child. With his Vector character disabled, Miller asks Critter to convert a character from his personal account so that he can return to the Underworld and continue with his plans.
88	39	"Instigation"; Transliteration: "Sendō" (Japanese: 扇動)	Takehiro Miura	Munemasa Nakamoto	July 26, 2020	November 22, 2020	
Sinon finds Alice mourning Bercoulli's death and instructs her to keep proceeding to the World's End Altar while she stays behind to face Vector when he returns from the real world. Meanwhile, Sheyta and Iskahn fight the enemy forces until exhaustion, declaring their newfound love for each other before being overwhelmed. Asuna and the others are surprised when Vassago reappears, using his PoH character and leading a massive army of Korean and Chinese players. Miller logs back in using his Subtilizer character to face a horrified Sinon. At the Ocean Turtle, Higa is about to hack into the main control room to restore Kirito's Fluctlight when Yanai threatens him at gunpoint.
89	40	"Code 871"; Transliteration: "Kōdo Hachi-Nana-Ichi" (Japanese: コード871)	Takashi Sakuma	Kohei Urushibara	August 2, 2020	December 6, 2020	
Revealing that he is the traitor cooperating with the Americans, Yanai confesses that he used to work with Sugou in his illegal experiments and was also working with Administrator to sabotage the Alicization Project out of love for her and wants Kirito to die in revenge for her death. Meanwhile, Kikuoka and Rinko discover that Yanai was responsible for inserting code 871 into UW and realize his betrayal. At UW, Subtlizer overpowers Sinon but she is saved by her connection with Kirito, while Sheyta and Iskahn are about to be killed along the surviving pugilists when Leafa and Lilpilin arrive with the Orc forces to rescue them and the ALO players attempt to convince the Chinese and Korean players that they were deceived but Vassago intervenes and stops them. In the end, Asuna and the others surrender to protect the UW residents and Vassago reveals himself as PoH to Asuna, confessing that he was the one who tipped off the rest of Laughing Coffin in SAO so that Asuna, Kirito and the rest of the forward players would become murderers. He then asks for Kirito to be brought before him, despite Asuna's pleas. Elsewhere, the old SAO server starts up.
90	41	"Prince of Hell"; Transliteration: "Akuma no Ko" (Japanese: 悪魔の子)	Akira Yamada	Munemasa Nakamoto	August 9, 2020	December 13, 2020	
While Yui notices the server starting, Vassago is about to kill Kirito when Eiji and Yuna arrive to help him. Eiji fights Vassago to avenge his friends from SAO but is defeated and Yuna takes him away. At the occasion, two of the red players recognize Vassago as a member of Laughing Coffin and attempt to dissuade the others, but to no avail, and Vassago uses his powers to make them fight each other instead. In the occasion, Vassago reminisces about his hatred toward Japanese people, which comes from his Japanese father who abandoned him and his mother, who was his mistress, and only came to meet him years later to ask for him to donate a kidney to save his other, legitimate son, leading him to steal a Nerve Gear and log into SAO, despite knowing the risks, so that he could kill Japanese players at will. Meanwhile, Sinon is overpowered by Subtlizer when she manages to turn the battle and almost defeats the enemy, who is forced to retreat, while Leafa fights a horde of red players until exhaustion. Back at the Ocean Turtle, Rinko throws a wrench on Yanai which makes him lose his balance and fall to his death, allowing Higa to proceed with his effort to use Asuna, Sinon and Leafa's Fluctlights to restore Kirito's.
Part 7: Alicization Lasting
91	42	"Memories"; Transliteration: "Kioku" (Japanese: 記憶)	Yuya Horiuchi	Munemasa Nakamoto	August 16, 2020	January 3, 2021	
Still in a coma, Kirito is haunted by painful memories of his past while Vassago threatens to kill all Japanese players and UW residents until he awakens. Hearing Yuuki's words of encouragement, Asuna rises up again and pushes the enemy back, almost defeating him. However, Vassago siphons the energy around him to restore himself and takes control of the red players, ordering them to attack. Meanwhile, Higa realizes that Asuna, Sinon and Leafa's Fluctlights combined are insufficient to bring Kirito back, until a fragment of Eugeo's own Fluctlight reaches Kirito, giving him the final push he needs to overcome his guilt and restore his Fluctlight. Back in UW, Kirito finally awakens and uses Eugeo's Perfect Enhanced Armament to freeze the red players, and confronts Vassago to protect his friends.
92	43	"Awakening"; Transliteration: "Kakusei" (Japanese: 覚醒)	Shunsuke Nakashige	Kohei Urushibara	August 23, 2020	January 10, 2021	
Kirito fights Vassago, unable to use his right arm to prevent the foreign players from attacking the others until Eugeo's spirit appears next to him. They use the power of both swords to forcibly log out all red players from UW. Vassago attempts to use their residual life force to empower himself, but Kirito uses it to restore Eugeo's sword and revert to his old SAO avatar. Kirito then fights and defeats Vassago. Kirito uses the power of his sword to transform Vassago's avatar into a giant tree resembling Gigas Cedar, trapping him inside UW for eternity. This caused Vassago's real life body to age rapidly. After restoring the survivors, Kirito departs with Asuna to help Alice who is traveling to the World End's Altar with Miller chasing her. Meanwhile, at the Ocean Turtle, the American soldiers release the limiters of the UW server, which will accelerate time inside UW millions of times. Kikuoka warns Kirito to escape with Asuna through the World End's Altar, or they will be trapped there for 200 years. Reaching the altar, Alice orders her dragons to flee, but they decide to confront Miller instead. Kirito and Asuna arrive to protect them.
93	44	"The Night-Sky Blade"; Transliteration: "Yozora no Ken" (Japanese: 夜空の剣)	Masakazu Kohara	Munemasa Nakamoto	August 30, 2020	January 17, 2021	
To save the dragons from death, Kirito turns them back into eggs and while Asuna takes Alice to the World End's Altar, Kirito stays behind to confront Miller. Despite his new abilities, Kirito is easily overpowered by Miller until he releases the power of both his swords, which restrains the enemy and creates a night sky across all UW, with all of Kirito's friends sending their thoughts to empower him. With the help of Eugeo's spirit, Kirito defeats Miller for good just as the UW server reaches maximum acceleration, which forcibly logs out all other players from UW while Alice also departs to the real world through the altar. Realizing that he will be trapped inside UW for 200 years, Kirito bursts into tears until Asuna appears before him, much to his surprise.
94	45	"Beyond Time"; Transliteration: "Toki no Kanata" (Japanese: 時の彼方)	Tomoya Tanaka	Munemasa Nakamoto	September 6, 2020	January 24, 2021	
Rinko retrieves Alice's Lightcube, but Asuna informs her that she will stay behind in UW to be with Kirito, and the system enters the maximum acceleration phase. Meanwhile, Miller returns to the real world, just to find that his body is dead and his soul is dragged to Hell. Upon learning that both Miller and Vassago were ultimately defeated, Critter and the other remaining attackers decide to flee. Before fleeing, they rigged Ocean Turtle's main engine with explosives. However, Akihiko Kayaba takes possession of one of the installation's robots and successfully disarms the bomb. On their retreat, Critter finds out the other attackers never found Vassago's body. The robot used by Kayaba also disappears. Back in UW during the post-credits, Kirito and Asuna depart from the World's End Altar to explore the world together.
95	46	"Alice"; Transliteration: "Arisu" (Japanese: アリス)	Akira Yamada	Munemasa Nakamoto	September 13, 2020	January 31, 2021	
Rinko holds a press conference to introduce Alice as the first autonomous Artificial Intelligence with her Fluctlight implanted into an android. Higa continues watching over Kirito and Asuna at the Ocean Turtle along Kikuoka, who was officially declared dead as a means to cover up the whole incident. During the interview, Alice notices that Kazuto is awakening and leaves to meet him. Once Kazuto awakes, he tells Alice that her sister is in a deep freeze at the Central Cathedral, waiting to meet her again, and asks Higa to erase all of his and Asuna's memories of the 200 years they spent together. While recuperating at the hospital, Kazuto and Asuna are visited by Kikuoka, who tells them that he has a plan to prevent the government from seizing UW and its residents. Higa talks to a copy of Kazuto that he made before the deletion, who asks for his help to contact Kayaba to look for a way to protect UW. At home, Kazuto mourns Eugeo's death when Suguha approaches him and asks him to tell her his story. Alice feels uneasy and Rinko attempts to call Kazuto the next morning.
96	47	"New World"; Transliteration: "Nyū Wārudo" (Japanese: ニューワールド)	Takashi Sakuma	Munemasa Nakamoto	September 20, 2020	February 7, 2021	
Kazuto receives a call from Rinko informing him that Alice has gone missing. Kazuto receives a package and finds that Alice has mailed herself to his house. She expresses her anger with Kazuto for staying behind in the Underworld. After comforting Alice, Kazuto shows her the family dojo where they have a sparring session. As the family celebrates Kazuto's release from the hospital, Kazuto's uncle expresses his concern about recent events and Kazuto apologizes. Later, Alice informs Kazuto's of a cryptic email she received as a means to connect with the Underworld. Alice, Kazuto, and Asuna head to Rath to test their theory. They log in and find themselves in outer space within view of the planet Cardina where the human empire resides. Suddenly, two spacecraft piloted by Ronie and Tiese's descendants appear, chased by a space monster known as the Abyssal Horror. Kirito steps in with Asuna and Alice to kill it. The Integrity Pilots immediately recognize them as the Star King, Star Queen, and Integrity Knight Alice, with a brief glimmer of Eugeo. Teary-eyed, they rejoice at meeting the legendary heroes of the Underworld and fly back to Cardina.

=== Recap specials ===
Story	Episode	Title	Original release date	Ref.
67.5	18.5	"Recollection"; Transliteration: "Rikorekushon" (Japanese: リコレクション)	February 17, 2019	
Kirito recaps the events of Alicization so far to Alice. Summarizes the first 18 episodes.
73.5	24.5	"Reflection"; Transliteration: "Rifurekushon" (Japanese: リフレクション)	October 6, 2019	
A recap episode summarizing the first 24 episodes.
85.5	36.5	"Reminiscence"; Transliteration: "Reminisensu" (Japanese: レミニセンス)	July 5, 2020	
A recap episode summarizing the first 36 episodes.

== Home media release ==
=== Japanese ===
==== Sword Art Online: Alicization ====
Aniplex (Japan, Region 2)
Volume	Episodes	Blu-ray and DVD release date
Volume 1	1–3	January 30, 2019
Volume 2	4–6	February 27, 2019
Volume 3	7–9	March 27, 2019
Volume 4	10–12	April 24, 2019
Volume 5	13–15	May 29, 2019
Volume 6	16–18.5	June 20, 2019
Volume 7	19–21	July 24, 2019
Volume 8	22–24	August 28, 2019

==== Sword Art Online: Alicization – War of Underworld ====
Aniplex (Japan, Region 2)
Volume	Episodes	Blu-ray and DVD release date
Volume 1	1–3	December 25, 2019
Volume 2	4–6	January 29, 2020
Volume 3	7–9	February 26, 2020
Volume 4	10–12	March 25, 2020
Volume 5	13–15	September 9, 2020
Volume 6	16–18	October 14, 2020
Volume 7	19–21	November 11, 2020
Volume 8	22–23	December 9, 2020
