= Unlasting =

- The regular edition cover

Single by Lisa

from the album Leo-Nine
- B-side: "Howl"
- Released: October 21, 2019 (digital); December 11, 2019 (physical)
- Recorded: 2019
- Studio: Sony Music, Tokyo, Japan
- Genre: J-pop
- Length: 4:57
- Label: Sacra Music
- Composer: Kayoko Kusano
- Lyricist: Lisa
- Producer: Lisa

Lisa singles chronology
"Gurenge" (2019)	"Unlasting" (2019)	"Homura" (2020)

Alternative cover
- The limited anime edition cover

Music video
- "Unlasting" (music clip YouTube edit version) on YouTube

"Unlasting" (stylized in all lowercase) is a song by Japanese pop singer Lisa. It was released as her sixteenth single digitally on October 21, 2019, and received a physical release on December 11, 2019. It reached number 4 on Oricon and number 6 on Japan Hot 100. It was used as the first ending theme song for the anime series Sword Art Online: Alicization - War of Underworld.

== Release ==
On 6 October 2019, the official website of the anime Sword Art Online: Alicization - War of Underworld revealed about the ending theme song "Unlasting" that would be sung by Lisa. The song was released digitally on 21 October 2019, and received a physical release on 11 December 2019 on three edition; Regular edition, Limited edition and Limited anime edition. The single reached number 4 on Oricon, 6 on Japan Hot 100, and 5 on Japan Hot Animation with spent 17, 6 and 12 weeks respectively. The song will be featured in her fifth album Leo-Nine.

== Music video ==
The music video for "Unlasting" was directed by Kentaro Osawa, and produced by Hiroshi Takayama. The video features a heart-rending story of a breakup between a man and woman in the style of a short dramatic film, with some scene featuring them with rain effect. The video expanded their story from when they were a couple until their breakup. Some scene feature Lisa singing in the room with haze effect. The video ends when both of them part ways.

== Track listing ==
=== Regular edition ===
CD
No.	Title	Length
1.	"unlasting"	4:57
2.	"Howl"	4:53
3.	"Kaleido"	5:43
4.	"unlasting" (Instrumental)	4:55

=== Limited edition ===
CD
No.	Title	Length
1.	"unlasting"	4:57
2.	"Howl"	4:53
3.	"Kaleido"	5:43
4.	"unlasting" (Instrumental)	4:55

DVD
No.	Title	Length
1.	"unlasting" (music video)	3:56

=== Limited anime edition ===
CD
No.	Title	Length
1.	"unlasting"	4:57
2.	"Howl"	4:53
3.	"Chill-Chill-Dal-Da"	4:09
4.	"unlasting" (Sword Art Online: Alicization - War of Underworld ED ver)	1:29

DVD
No.	Title	Length
1.	"unlasting" (Sword Art Online: Alicization - War of Underworld ending version without credit)	1:42

== Personnel ==
Singer and bands

- Lisa – Vocals, Lyrics (unlasting, Howl)
- Hidenori Tanaka, Tomoya Tabuchi - Lyrics (Kaleido, Chill-Chill-Dal-Da)
- Masaki Nonomura - Erhu Arranger
- Kanae Nozawa - Erhu performer
- Shota Horie - Arranger, Other Instruments

Production

- Nobuyuki Murakami – recording, mixing
- Naoki Kawashima – assistant
- Akihiro Shiba, TEMAS – mastering

== Charts ==
Year	Chart	Peak position
2019	Oricon	4
2019	Japan Hot 100	6
2019	Japan Hot Animation	5

== Release history ==
Region	Date	Label	Format	Catalog
Japan	11 December 2019	Sacra Music	CD	VVCL-1582
Japan	11 December 2019	Sacra Music	CD+DVD	VVCL-1580
Japan	11 December 2019	Sacra Music	CD+DVD	VVCL-1583
