= Crossing Field =

2012 single by LiSA

Single by LiSA

from the album Landspace
- Language: Japanese
- B-side: "KiSS me PARADOX"
- Released: August 8, 2012
- Recorded: 2012
- Genre: Pop rock; electronic rock
- Length: 4:11
- Label: Aniplex
- Songwriter: Watanabe Shō
- Producer: Watanabe Shō

LiSA singles chronology
| "Oath Sign" (2011) | "Crossing Field" (2012) | "Best Day, Best Way" (2013) |

"Crossing Field" (stylized in all lowercase) is a song by Japanese pop singer Lisa. It was released on August 8, 2012, and gained prominence as the first opening theme for the anime series Sword Art Online. The music was composed and written by Watanabe Shō, with the arrangement handled by Toku. The single was released by the record label Aniplex, and the song was later featured on Lisa's second studio album, Landspace, on October 30, 2013.

The single debuted at number five on the Japanese Oricon Singles Chart, becoming Lisa's second entry into the top ten, after her release "Oath Sign". The single was later certified gold, furthermore Platinum by the Recording Industry Association of Japan (RIAJ) after exceeding 250,000 units in digital sales, a dual commercial achievement that makes it one of Lisa's highest-charting and best-certifying singles.

== Production and Usage ==
"Crossing Field" was created following a commission to serve as the opening theme for the Sword Art Online anime series. It served in episode 2-14, as the opening of season 1, and was finally used as the outro for episode 25 of Season 1. This project marked the third time Lisa participated in the creation of an original song specifically intended for a television adaptation. Watanabē Shō is credited with both the composition and the lyrical content of the track. The track's final arrangement and instrumentation were executed by Toku. The song itself was published by record label Aniplex, a subsidiary of Sony Music Entertainment Japan.

Lisa described the themes of the song to be "trust" and "belief". She also stated that she liked to work with Watanabē Shō due to his "emotional" writing style. The instrumentation for the track includes: drums (Yu-ya Ishii), guitar (Takafumi "CO-K" Koukei), bass (Yuichi Takama), and keyboard (Takahiro Ito). A crucial component of the track's cinematic sound is the use of orchestral elements, specifically recorded by the Crusher Kimura Strings.

== Reception ==
CDJournal stated that "Crossing Field" was "powerful yet sorrowful." Alongside that, they commented that the B-side "KiSS me PARADOX" is a cute song. Anime News Network stated that it became a huge success with over 340,000 downloads worldwide. Berkeley B-Side praised the track, noting that its "pop-rock melody is best suited by LiSA's powerful, soaring vocals." The publication highlighted the song's "soaring and starry intro" as effectively "capturing the feeling of being transported into the virtual fantasy world."

== Charts ==
Single charts
| Chart | Peak position |
|---|---|
| Japan (Oricon) | 5 |
| Japan (Japan Hot 100) | 10 |
