= Lover"s"mile =

Album by LiSA

Studio album by Lisa
- Released: February 22, 2012
- Genres: J-pop, pop-rock
- Length: 61:16
- Language: Japanese
- Label: Aniplex

Lisa chronology
Letters To U (2011)	Lover"s"mile (2012)	Land Space (2013)

Singles from Lover"s"mile
- 1. "Oath Sign" Released: November 23, 2011

Lover"s"mile (stylized LOVER"S"MiLE) is the debut studio album by Japanese singer, Lisa. It was released on February 22nd, 2012 under Aniplex. It sold over 21,131 copies.

== Background and composition ==
After the release of her debut EP, Letters To U, she appeared at Anime Festival Asia in Singapore, making it her first overseas performance.

The album's lead single, "Oath Sign", is the first opening theme for the anime series, Fate/Zero. Released on November 23rd, 2011, It peaked at number 5 and stayed for 24 weeks. It was later certified gold by the RIAJ.

The album performed well commercially, reaching number 7 on Oricon and number 5 on Billboard Japan. It was released on CD, DVD and Blu-ray.

The album features lyrics and music composed by Tomoya Tabuchi of Unison Square Garden, toku from Garnidelia, and Vocaloid producer wowaka.

== Track listing ==
No.	Title	Lyrics	Arrangement	Length
1.	"Yasashisa ni Tadoritsuku Made (優しさに辿りつくまで)"	Lisa Oribe	Toku	4:22
2.	"Oath Sign"	Sho Watanabe	Toku	4:10
3.	"Now and future"	Oribe	Keiichi Wakui, Naoki Chiba	4:20
4.	"Egoistic Shooter"	Oribe	Wowaka, Toku	3:04
5.	"Wild Candy"	Shin Furuya	Toku	3:55
6.	"Hana to Mitsubachi (花とミツバチ)"	Furuya	Toku	4:58
7.	"Rock-mode"	Oribe, Tomoya Tabuchi	Wakui, Chiba	4:16
8.	"Waratte Hoshikute (笑ってほしくて)"	Oribe	Love is Same All	3:55
9.	"Unfill (アンフィル)"	Toku	Toku	4:01
10.	"Jet Rocket (ジェットロケット)"	Tabuchi	Wakui, Chiba	4:53
11.	"Lover"s"mile"	Oribe	Toku	4:16
12.	"Owari no Nai Uta (終わりのない歌)"	Jun Maeda	Avant-Garde Eyes	9:33
13.	"Oath sign (Acoustic Ver.)"	Sho Watanabe	Takafumi "CO-K" Kokei, Kenta Yamamoto	5:26

== Charts ==
Daily charts
Chart (2012)	Peak position
Daily Chart (Oricon)	4

Weekly charts
Chart (2012)	Peak position
Japanese Albums (Oricon)	7
Top Albums (Billboard Japan)	32

== Release history ==
Region	Date	Format(s)	Label	Ref
Japan	February 22, 2012	CD, DVD, Blu-ray	Aniplex	
China	August 28, 2012	CD	Aniplex	

== Personnel ==
Sourced from CD booklet.

- Yuya Ishii: Drums (Tracks 1, 4, 5, 6, 9, 11)
- Reiji Suzuki (akkin): Guitar (Track 1, 9)
- Yuichi Takama: Bass (Tracks 4, 5, 6, 11)
- G.A.Cool: Guitar (Track 2)
- Takehiro Kojima: Bass (Track 1, 9)
- Seiichiro Hayakawa: Drums (Track 2)
- Takashi “CO-K” Takashi: Guitar (Tracks 3–7, 10, 11, 13)
- Takahiro Ito: Keyboards (Track 1, 4, 5, 6, 9, 11)
- Masatsugu Shinozaki Strings: Strings (Track 2)
- Hiroshi Sekita: Bass (Track 2)
- Toru Tomiyasu “Andro”: Drums (Tracks 3, 7, 10)
- Tomoya Tabuchi: Bass (Tracks 3, 7, 10)
- Atsushi Soejima: Drums (Track 8)
- Shota Kawahara, MESHICO: Guitar (Track 8)
- Bambi: Bass (Track 8)
- Keiichi Wakui: Sound Production (Track 8)
- Toshiyuki Takao: Drums (Track 12)
- Masayoshi Kikuchi: Guitar (Track 12)
- Tomohiko Okanda: Bass (Track 12)
- Kenta Yamamoto: Piano (Track 13)
