= Rising Hope =

Single by LiSA

from the album Launcher
- Released: May 7, 2014
- Recorded: 2014
- Genre: J-pop; Anisong; rock
- Length: 4:12
- Label: Aniplex
- Songwriters: LiSA; Tomoya Tabuchi
- Composer: Tomoya Tabuchi

LiSA singles chronology
"Träumerei" (2013)	"Rising Hope" (2014)	"Bright Flight / L.Miranic" (2014)

Music video
- "Rising Hope" on YouTube

"Rising Hope" (stylized as "RISING HOPE") is a song by Japanese pop singer Lisa. It was released on May 7, 2014, as her fifth solo single under Aniplex. The track served as the first opening theme for the 2014 anime series The Irregular at Magic High School.

"Rising Hope" has been certified Platinum by the Recording Industry Association of Japan (RIAJ) for surpassing 250,000 digital downloads, and Gold for streaming.

== Background and composition ==
"Rising Hope" was written specifically as the opening theme for the anime series The Irregular at Magic High School. The song was composed and arranged by Tomoya Tabuchi of the rock band Unison Square Garden, who also co-written the lyrics alongside Lisa. The track is characterized by its high-tempo rock arrangement, incorporating elements of rap and syncopated rhythmic structures, which LiSA described as a "challenging" vocal performance intended to reflect the themes of the anime. The arrangement was handled by Shota Horie, who used complex melodic transitions to match the series' "magic and technology" setting.

== Release and reception ==
The single was released in Japan on May 7, 2014, in three formats: a regular edition, a limited edition featuring a music video, and a limited anime edition with a different track listing. Commercially, the song debuted at number four on the Oricon Weekly Singles Chart, selling over 30,000 copies in its first week. It also reached number three on the Billboard Japan Hot 100.

The song has received long-term commercial success in digital formats. It was certified Platinum by the Recording Industry Association of Japan (RIAJ) for exceeding 250,000 digital downloads and Gold for surpassing 50 million streams.

== Release formats ==
Format	Catalog number	Content	Ref.
First Press Limited Edition	SVWC-70001–2	CD + DVD (Music Video)	
Anime Limited Edition	SVWC-70003–4	CD + DVD (Non-credit Opening)	
Regular Edition	SVWC-70005	CD	
Digital Download	—	Digital single	

== Music video ==
A music video for "Rising Hope" was directed by Hideaki Fukui. A shortened version of the music clip was uploaded to Lisa's YouTube channel to promote the single, later garnering over 34 million views.
