= Homura (song) =

2020 song by LiSA

- Cover art for the regular and digital version

Single by Lisa

from the album Lander
- B-side: "Lost romance"
- Released: October 14, 2020
- Genre: J-pop
- Length: 4:34
- Label: Sacra Music; Sony Music Japan
- Composer: Yuki Kajiura
- Lyricists: Yuki Kajiura; Lisa
- Producer: Yuki Kajiura

Lisa singles chronology
"Unlasting" (2019)	"Homura" (2020)	"Saikai" (2020)

Music video
- "Homura" on YouTube

"Homura" (Japanese: 炎; lit. 'Flame') is a song by Japanese singer Lisa. It is the singer's seventeenth single and includes three other tracks. The song was released on October 14, 2020, by Sacra Music and Sony Music Japan. It serves as the theme song for the film Demon Slayer: Kimetsu no Yaiba – The Movie: Mugen Train (2020). "Homura" won the grand prize at the 62nd Japan Record Awards in 2020, and the 43th Anime Grand Prix in Best Theme Song category (By doing so, Lisa became the first artist in 20 years to win the Anime Grand Prix in Best Theme Song category for two consecutive years since Maaya Sakamoto won in 1999 and 2000).

== Background and release ==
Lisa released "Gurenge" in July 2019, which served as the opening theme of the anime series Demon Slayer: Kimetsu no Yaiba. "Gurenge" was commercially successful, reaching number two on the Japan Hot 100 chart and was certified Million by the Recording Industry Association of Japan. On August 2, 2020, "Homura" was announced as the opening theme song of the film version of the anime series Demon Slayer: Kimetsu no Yaiba – The Movie: Mugen Train, that was slated to be released on October 16, 2020. The single was released in digital and CD formats on October 14, 2020, by Sacra Music and Sony Music Japan, in conjunction with Lisa's studio album Leo Nine. The physical version was made available in three different editions: Regular Edition, Limited Edition and First Press Limited Edition. All three versions contain "Homura" as A-side and "Lost romance" as B-side. Both the regular and first press limited editions include "Leopardess" as B-side whereas and "My Friends Forever" comes as a B-side exclusively on the limited edition.

== Composition ==
Lisa wrote "Homura" with its composer Yuki Kajiura, with the latter also handling production. Musically, it is a ballad number. Speaking about the song, Lisa stated, "I've been involved in numerous anime works, and 'Homura' was another song that I wrote by putting a lot of thought into the work it would accompany, just like every other track that I've released." Within the context of the film, the song is used as the character Kyojuro Rengoku's requiem, with the lyrics appearing to be from the perspective of his apparition.

== Music video ==
The music video for the song, directed by Masakazu Fukatsu, was uploaded to Lisa's YouTube channel on October 14, 2020. It was preceded by a trailer released to the same platform on October 2. The video features Lisa singing "Homura" on a solitary sea beach, against the backdrop of changing colours of the sky at the break of dawn.

== Commercial performance ==
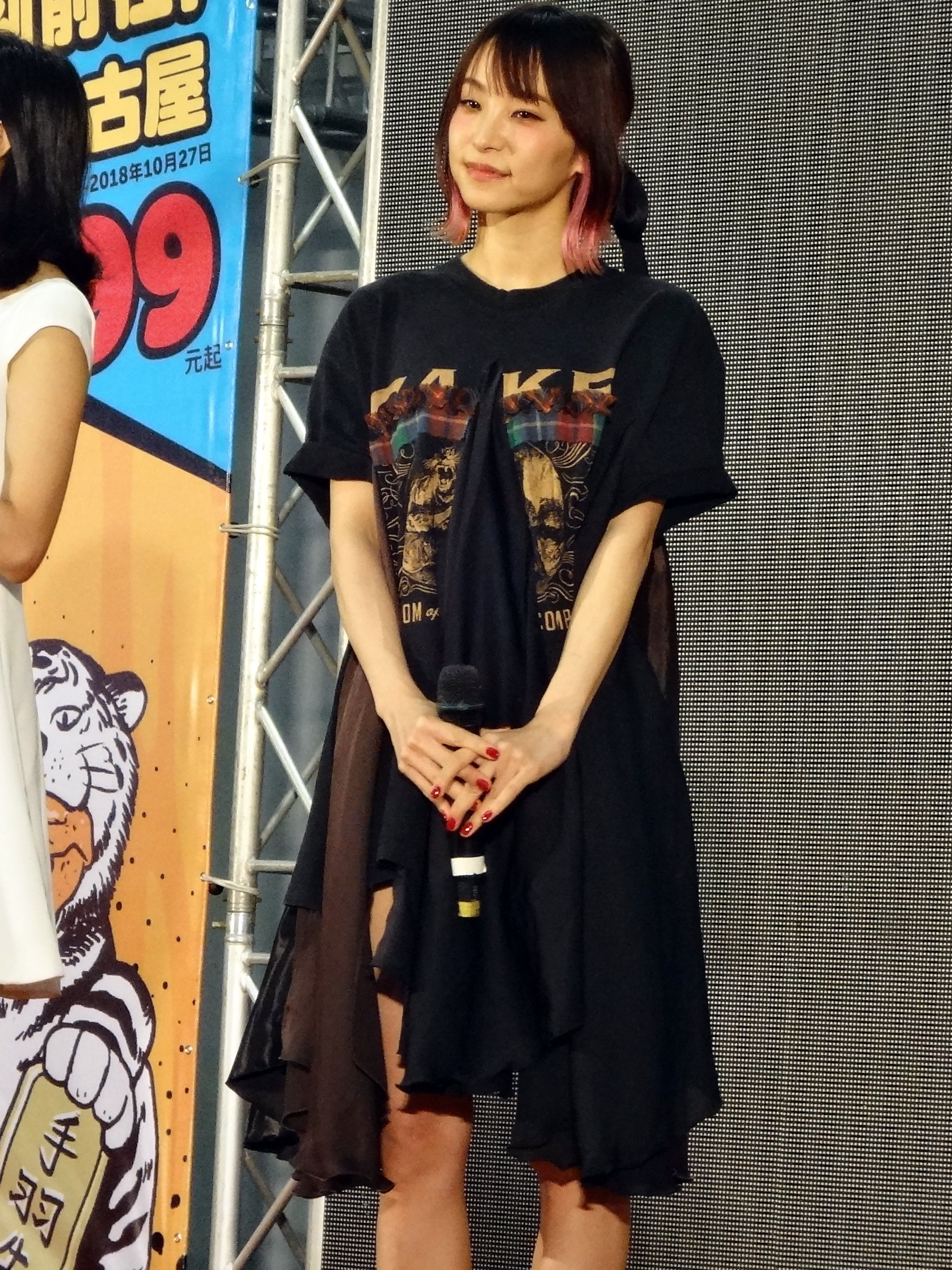
With "Homura" and Leo-Nine, Lisa (pictured) became the first ever artist to simultaneously debut a song and an album at number one on Billboard Japan's charts.

"Homura" was debuted at number one on the Oricon Singles Chart on the chart issue dated October 20, 2020, selling 68,000 copies in its first week. Additionally, Lisa topped the Oricon Albums Chart with Leo-Nine simultaneously. By doing so, Lisa became the first female artist in 16 years and 6 months to do so since Hikaru Utada. The single simultaneously topped Oricon's Weekly Digital Single and Combined Streaming charts, recording over 141,000 download sales and 8.67 million streams in its opening week. In its second week, the song maintained its number one spot, selling another 42,000 copies. In doing so, Lisa became the first female artist to earn the number one spot for two consecutive weeks since Kana Uemura's "Toilet no Kamisama" (2011). It sold 133,087 downloads on the digital singles chart and recorded over 16.74 million streams, breaking the record of highest streams which was previously held by NiziU's "Make You Happy" (2020). On the week of November 3, 2020, "Homura" remained at number one with 32,000 copies sold, thus tallying a total of three consecutive weeks atop the Oricon chart. It became the first song to do so in 12 years and 10 months since SMAP's "Dangan Faitā" (2007). On the week of December 23, 2020, the single remained at the top spot on the digital singles chart, spending a total of 10 consecutive weeks and tied the record of most weeks at number one with Kenshi Yonezu's "Lemon" (2018). The following week, it maintained its position, tallying a total of 11 consecutive weeks at number one and becoming the longest-running chart-topper on the chart.

"Homura" arrived at number one on the Japan Hot 100 chart, with 65,000 copies in its first tracking week. With Leo-Nine simultaneously topping the Hot Albums chart, Lisa became the first act in history to have both a song and an album debut at number one on the chart. The song held its position in its second week, with 28,832 units sold and 18.8 million streams. With "Gurenge" climbing back to number two, LiSA simultaneously claimed the top two spots on the chart. On Billboard Japan's Streaming chart dated December 7, 2020, the single amassed cumulative streams of over 100 million, becoming the fastest song to do so in seven weeks and surpassed the record of BTS' "Dynamite" (2020). For the year-end chart, it was the ninth best-performing single of 2020 on the Japan Hot 100. "Homura" was certified platinum by the RIAJ for exceeding 250,000 physical units and million for exceeding 1 million digital sales.

On the week of October 24, 2020, "Homura" debuted at number 62 on the Billboard Global 200 and at number 21 on the Billboard Global Excl. US charts. In its second week, the song reached a peak of number eight on the Billboard Global 200, with 19.4 million streams and 97,000 download sales globally. It simultaneously climbed to number two on the Billboard Global Excl. US chart.

== Track listing ==
Digital download
No.	Title	Lyrics	Music	Arrangement	Length
1.	"Homura"	Yuki Kajiura; Lisa	Yuki Kajiura	Yuki Kajiura	4:34
2.	"Lost romance"	Lisa	Sho (My First Story)	Sho (My First Story)	3:57
3.	"Leopardess"	Sarari Matsubara	Hi-yunk (Back On)	Hi-yunk	3:06
4.	"My Friends Forever"	Masato Kanai	Katsumi Onishi	Ryo Eguchi	4:28
5.	"Homura (Instrumental)"				4:34
Total length:					21:00

CD single – Regular edition / First press limited edition
No.	Title	Length
1.	"Homura"	4:34
2.	"Lost romance"	3:57
3.	"Leopardess"	3:06
4.	"Homura (Instrumental)"	4:34

CD single – Limited edition
No.	Title	Length
1.	"Homura"	4:34
2.	"Lost romance"	3:57
3.	"My Friends Forever"	4:28
4.	"Homura (Instrumental)"	4:34

== Charts ==
=== Weekly charts ===
Weekly chart performance for "Homura"
Chart (2020)	Peak position
Global 200 (Billboard)	8
Japan (Japan Hot 100)	1
Japan Hot Animation (Billboard Japan)	1
Japan (Oricon)	1
Japan Combined Singles (Oricon)	1
Japan Anime Singles (Oricon)	1
US World Digital Song Sales (Billboard)	7

=== Monthly charts ===
Monthly chart performance for "Homura"
Chart (2023)	Position
Japan (Oricon)	3
Japan Anime Singles (Oricon)	2

=== Year-end charts ===
Year-end chart performance for "Homura"
Chart (2020)	Position
Japan (Japan Hot 100)	9
Japan Hot Animation (Billboard Japan)	2
Japan (Oricon)	22
Japan Combined Singles (Oricon)	8
Chart (2021)	Position
Global Excl. US (Billboard)	107
Japan (Japan Hot 100)	4
Japan Hot Animation (Billboard Japan)	1
Chart (2022)	Position
Japan (Japan Hot 100)	66
Japan Hot Animation (Billboard Japan)	17

== Certifications ==
Region	Certification	Certified units/sales
Japan (RIAJ) Physical single	Platinum	250,000^{^}
Japan (RIAJ) Digital single	Million	1,000,000^{*}
Japan (RIAJ)	Platinum	100,000,000^{†}
^{*} Sales figures based on certification alone.^{^} Shipments figures based on certification alone.^{†} Streaming-only figures based on certification alone.

Preceded by "Paprika" (Foorin)	Japan Record Award Grand Prix; 2020	Succeeded by "Citrus" (Da-ice)
