= Gurenge =

- Regular edition and digital EP cover

Single by Lisa

from the album Leo-Nine
- B-side: "Propaganda"; "Yakusoku no Uta"
- Released: July 3, 2019
- Recorded: 2019
- Studio: Onkio Haus & Victor (Tokyo)
- Genre: J-pop; pop-punk
- Length: 3:58
- Label: Sacra Music
- Composer: Kayoko Kusano
- Lyricist: Lisa
- Producer: Ryo Eguchi

Lisa singles chronology
"Akai Wana (Who Loves It?)" / "Adamas" (2018)	"Gurenge" (2019)	"Unlasting" (2019)

Alternative cover
- Limited anime edition cover

Music video
- "Gurenge" on YouTube

"Gurenge" (Japanese: 紅蓮華; lit. 'Red Lotus') is a song by Japanese pop singer Lisa from her fifth studio album Leo-Nine. It was released as her fifteenth single digitally on April 22, 2019, and received a physical release on July 3, 2019. Commercially, the single peaked at number three on the Oricon Singles Chart, and number two on Billboard Japan Hot 100. It was used as the first opening theme song for the Japanese anime series Demon Slayer: Kimetsu no Yaiba.

== Background and release ==
On March 24, 2019, the official website of the anime Demon Slayer: Kimetsu no Yaiba revealed the opening theme song "Gurenge" that would be sung by Lisa. The song was released digitally on April 22, 2019, and received a physical single on July 3, 2019, on three editions; regular, limited, and limited anime edition. The song was featured live on YouTube channel The First Take and also on 2019 Kōhaku Uta Gassen. The song also featured in her fifth album Leo-Nine.

== Reception ==
"Gurenge" won a Newtype Anime Awards for 2019 best theme song, and won on 34th Japan Gold Disc Award for Best 5 Songs by Download. The song has been covered by people across the world on YouTube. One of them was the Japanese duo Garnidelia, who made a self cover of the song in their official YouTube; the cover is part of their official cover, titled Garnidelia Cover Collection. An instrumental rendition of the song was featured during the closing ceremony of the 2020 Tokyo Olympics.

== Commercial performance ==
"Gurenge" reached number three on the Oricon Singles Chart, two on the Billboard Japan Hot 100, and one on the Japan Hot Animation. In May 2019, "Gurenge" was certified gold by the Recording Industry Association of Japan (RIAJ) for 100,000 full-track digital music downloads.

In July 2020, "Gurenge" was certified million by the Recording Industry Association of Japan (RIAJ) for 1,000,000 full-track digital music downloads. "Gurenge" became the first single by female artist to surpass 1 million downloads in the history of Oricon Digital Single Chart. The single also become the third overall single in the chart's history to do so, after Kenshi Yonezu's 2018 single "Lemon", and his 2019 single "Uma to Shika".

== Music video ==
The music video for "Gurenge" was directed by Masakazu Fukatsu. and produced by Hiroshi Takayama. The video features Lisa using red scarf & black cloth as motifs, wearing a white sleeveless shirt and red shorts, dancing alongside two demons. Sometimes the scenes would show the demons with black and red effect. The video ends with Lisa donning a demon mask. The demons are played by Shinji Kanazawa and Mai Shimizu.

== Track listing ==
Regular and limited edition – CD
No.	Title	Lyrics	Music	Arrangement	Length
1.	"Gurenge" (紅蓮華)	Lisa	Kayoko Kusano	Ryo Eguchi	3:58
2.	"Propaganda"	Toru Hidaka	Pablo A.K.A. WTF!?	Pablo	3:21
3.	"Yakusoku no Uta" (やくそくのうた)	Tomoya Tabuchi	Tabuchi	Eguchi	4:38
4.	"Gurenge" (instrumental)				3:55
Total length:					15:52

Limited edition – DVD
No.	Title	Director(s)	Length
1.	"Gurenge" (music video)	Masakazu Fukatsu	3:56
Total length:			19:48

Limited anime edition – CD
No.	Title	Length
1.	"Gurenge"	3:58
2.	"Propaganda"	3:21
3.	"Yakusoku no Uta"	4:38
4.	"Gurenge" (TV version)	1:29
Total length:		13:26

Limited anime edition – DVD
No.	Title	Length
1.	"Gurenge" (TV version without credit)	1:39
Total length:		15:05

Digital EP – digital download, streaming
No.	Title	Length
1.	"Gurenge"	3:58
2.	"Propaganda"	3:21
3.	"Yakusoku no Uta"	4:38
4.	"Gurenge" (instrumental)	3:55
5.	"Gurenge" (TV version)	1:29
Total length:		17:21

== Personnel ==
Musicians

- Lisa – vocals, lyrics (1)
- Toru Hidaka – lyrics (2)
- Tomoya Tabuchi – lyrics (3), composition (3)
- Kayoko Kusano – composition (1)
- Yuichi Takama – bass
- Pablo – composition (2), arrangement (2), guitar
- Osamu Hidai – drums
- Ryo Eguchi – arrangement (1, 3), other instruments

Production

- Yasuhisa Kataoka, Hiromitsu Takasu – recording
- Yasuhisa Kataoka – mixing
- Taisuke Uchino – assistant
- Akihiro Shiba, Temas – mastering

== Accolades ==
Awards and nominations for "Gurenge"
Ceremony	Year	Award	Result	Ref.
9th Newtype Anime Awards	2019	Best Theme Song	Won	
34th Japan Gold Disc Award	2020	Best 5 Songs by Download	Won	
39th JASRAC Awards	2021	Domestic Works	Won	

== Charts ==
=== Weekly charts ===
Chart performances for "Gurenge"
Chart (2019–2020)	Peak positions
Global 200 (Billboard)	73
Hong Kong (HKRIA)	8
Japan Hot 100 (Billboard)	2
Japan Hot Animation (Billboard Japan)	1
Japan (Oricon)	3
Japan Combined Singles (Oricon)	2
Japan Anime Singles (Oricon)	2
US World Digital Song Sales (Billboard)	7

=== Monthly charts ===
Monthly chart performance for "Gurenge"
Chart (2019)	Position
Japan (Oricon)	16
Japan Anime Singles (Oricon)	4

=== Year-end charts ===
Year-end chart performance for "Gurenge"
Chart (2019)	Position
Japan (Japan Hot 100)	26
Japan (Oricon)	92
Japan Combined Singles (Oricon)	37
Chart (2020)	Position
Japan (Japan Hot 100)	3
Japan (Oricon)	36
Japan Combined Singles (Oricon)	6
Chart (2021)	Position
Japan (Japan Hot 100)	16

=== All-time charts ===
All-time chart performance for "Gurenge"
Chart (2008–2022)	Position
Japan (Japan Hot 100)	9

== Certifications ==
Certifications for "Gurenge"
Region	Certification	Certified units/sales
Japan (RIAJ) Physical	Platinum	250,000^{^}
Japan (RIAJ) Digital	Million	1,000,000^{*}
Japan (RIAJ) Streaming	Platinum	100,000,000^{†}
^{*} Sales figures based on certification alone.^{^} Shipments figures based on certification alone.^{†} Streaming-only figures based on certification alone.

== Release history ==
Release dates and formats for "Gurenge"
Region	Date	Format	Version	Label
Various	April 22, 2019	Digital download; streaming	Pre-release	Sacra Music
Various	July 3, 2021	Digital download; streaming	Digital EP	Sacra Music
Japan	July 3, 2021	CD+DVD	Limited	Sacra Music
Japan	July 3, 2021	CD+DVD	Limited anime	Sacra Music
Japan	July 3, 2021	CD	Regular	Sacra Music
