= Lisa (Japanese musician, born 1987) =

LiSA
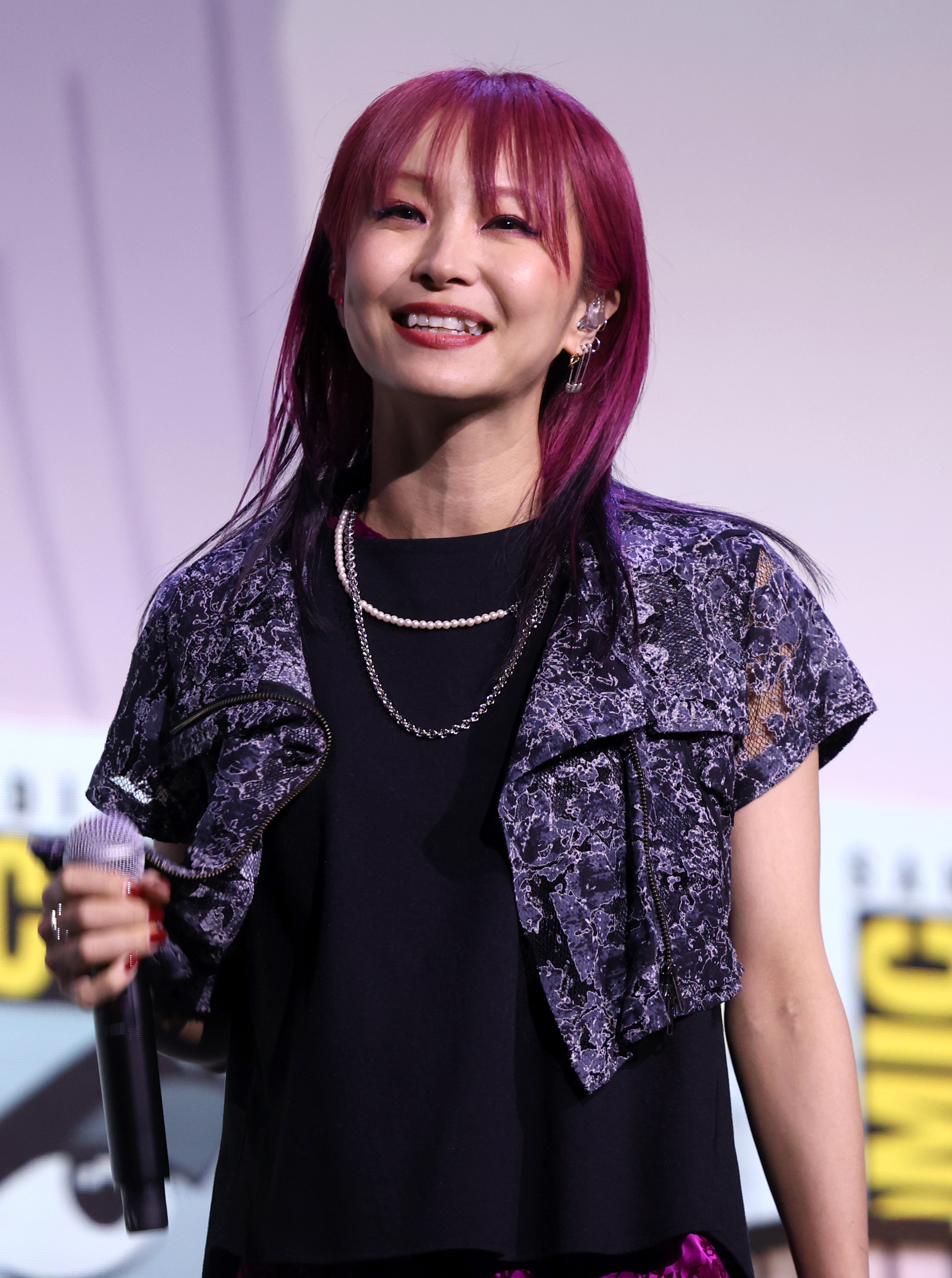
- LiSA in 2025
- Born: Risa Oribe; June 24, 1987 (age 39); Seki, Gifu, Japan
- Occupations: Singer; songwriter
- Years active: 2005–present
- Spouse: Tatsuhisa Suzuki (m. 2020)
- Children: 1
- Musical career
- Genres: J-pop; Anison; rock; punk rock; pop-punk
- Labels: Key Sounds; Aniplex; Sacra
- Formerly of: Girls Dead Monster
- Website: www.lxixsxa.com

Risa Oribe (織部 里沙, Oribe Risa; born June 24, 1987), known professionally as Lisa (stylized as LiSA), is a Japanese singer and songwriter from Seki, Gifu, signed to Sacra Music under Sony Music Artists.

After aspiring to become a musician early in life, she started her musical career as the vocalist of the indie band Chucky. Following Chucky's disbandment in 2008, Lisa moved to Tokyo to pursue a solo career, making her major debut in 2010 singing songs for the anime television series Angel Beats! as one of two vocalists for the fictional band Girls Dead Monster. In April 2011, she made her solo debut with the release of her mini-album Letters to U. She performed at Animelo Summer Live in August 2010, Anime Expo in 2012, and is a regular guest at Anime Festival Asia.

LiSA's songs have been featured as theme music for various anime such as Fate/Zero, Sword Art Online and Demon Slayer: Kimetsu no Yaiba. Her singles have regularly been in the top ten of the Oricon weekly charts, with "Crossing Field" being certified platinum by the Recording Industry Association of Japan and "Oath Sign" being certified gold. She performed at the Nippon Budokan in 2014 and 2015. In 2015, she made her acting debut as Madge Nelson in the Japanese dub of the animated film Minions.

== Career ==
=== Early years ===
Oribe was born in Gifu Prefecture on June 24, 1987. She took piano lessons starting at age three, and later took dance and vocal lessons, which continued through her junior high school years. While in elementary, she participated in an audition held at the Nippon Budokan, and it was during this time she decided to become an artist. In junior high school, she formed a band which covered songs by Avril Lavigne, Love Psychedelico, and Ego-Wrappin'.

Oribe began her singing career in 2005 during high school when she formed a band playing indie rock called Chucky. She chose not to attend university to focus on her work with Chucky, but it eventually became difficult for them to continue performing. Following the band's disbandment in July 2008, she moved to Tokyo to continue her singing career.

In Tokyo, Oribe formed the band Love is Same All with members from the indie band Parking Out and began using the stage name Lisa, which is an acronym for Love is Same All. The band performs with Lisa during the latter's solo live performances. In 2010, she made her major debut singing songs for the anime series Angel Beats! as one of two vocalists for the fictional in-story band Girls Dead Monster. She put out three singles and one album in 2010 under the name Girls Dead Monster on Key's record label Key Sounds Label. The first single "Thousand Enemies" was released on May 12; the second single "Little Braver" came out on June 9; and the third single "Ichiban no Takaramono (Yui final ver.)" (一番の宝物 〜Yui final ver.〜; "My Most Precious Treasure (Yui final ver.)") was sold on December 8. The album Keep The Beats! was released on June 30. Lisa made her first appearance at Animelo Summer Live during the concert's 2010 iteration on August 28.

=== 2011–2015: Solo debut ===
Lisa made her solo debut on April 20, 2011, with the release of the mini-album Letters to U by Aniplex under Sony Music Artists. The songs on the album were composed by dōjin and major artists, and she composed the first song "Believe in Myself"; she wrote the album's lyrics. On November 12, 2011, she appeared at the Anime Festival Asia in Singapore. She released her first solo single "Oath Sign" on November 23, 2011, which was used as the opening theme to the 2011 anime series Fate/Zero. The single peaked at No. 5 on the Oricon weekly charts and was certified gold by the Recording Industry Association of Japan (RIAJ).

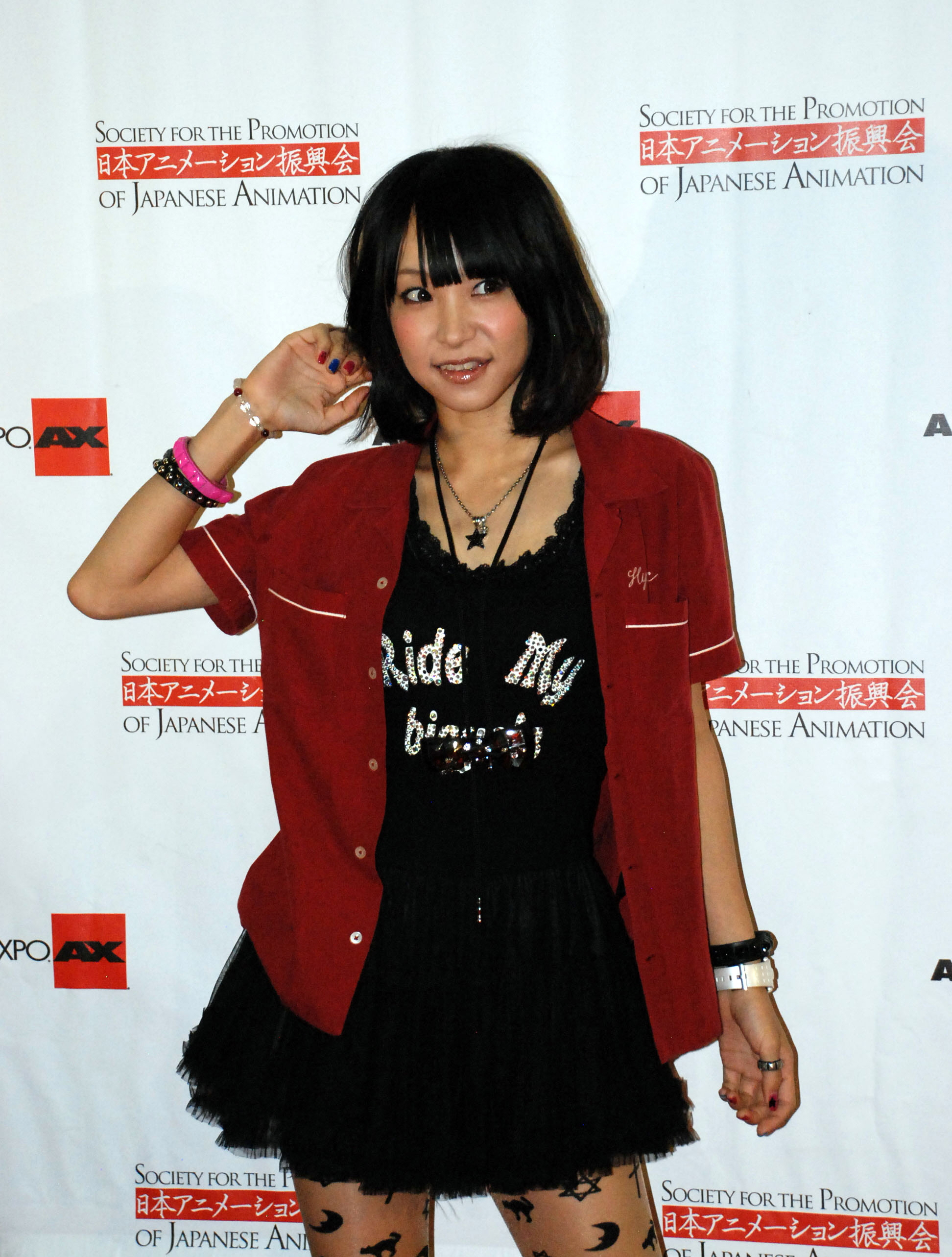
Lisa at the 2012 Anime Expo

Lisa released her first full solo album Lover"s"mile on February 22, 2012; the album peaked at No. 7 on the Oricon weekly charts. She attended the Anime Expo 2012 in Los Angeles as a guest of honor and performed her first concert in North America there on July 1. After her success with "Oath Sign", she was chosen to perform "Crossing Field", the first opening theme to the 2012 anime series Sword Art Online. "Crossing Field", released as a single on August 8, 2012; it peaked at No. 5 on Oricon and was later certified gold by the RIAJ. Her third single "Best Day, Best Way", which peaked at No. 6 on Oricon, was released on April 3, 2013, and her fourth single "Träumerei", which peaked at No. 15 on Oricon and was used as the opening theme to the 2013 anime series Day Break Illusion, was released on August 7, 2013. Lisa released her second solo album Landspace on October 30, 2013; the album peaked at No. 2 on Oricon charts.

On January 3, 2014, Lisa held a sold-out solo concert at the Nippon Budokan. Her fifth single "Rising Hope", which is used as the opening theme to the 2014 anime series The Irregular at Magic High School, was released on May 7, 2014; the single peaked at No. 4 on Oricon. She later covered the songs "Headphone Actor" (ヘッドフォンアクター) and "Yūkei Yesterday" (夕景イエスタデイ; "Yesterday Evening") from the Kagerou Project franchise for the sixth episode of the 2014 anime series Mekakucity Actors. She released her sixth single "Bright Flight / L. Miranic" on September 17, 2014, which peaked at No. 8 on Oricon, and her seventh single "Shirushi" (シルシ; lit. "Sign") on December 10, 2014, which peaked at No. 3 on the Oricon; the title song is used as the third ending theme to the 2014 anime series Sword Art Online II, and the single also includes the song "No More Time Machine", which was used as the second ending theme to Sword Art Online II.

She held her second Nippon Budokan concert on January 10 and 11, 2015, tickets for which were sold out. She released her third solo album Launcher on March 4, 2015 and her eighth single "Rally Go Round" on May 27, 2015; the song is used as the opening theme to the second season of the anime television series Nisekoi. She was cast as Madge Nelson in the Japanese dub of the animated film Minions, which premiered in Japanese theaters on July 31, 2015. She released her ninth single "Empty Mermaid" on September 30, 2015. In late 2015, she performed "ID", which was used as theme song of the 2015 video game Dengeki Bunko: Fighting Climax Ignition.

=== 2016–2021 ===
To commemorate her fifth year as a solo artist, Lisa released her Letters To U EP as a limited edition LP on March 23, 2016. She released a mini-album titled Lucky Hi Five! on April 20, 2016. She released the single "Brave Freak Out", which was used as the first opening theme to the 2016 anime television series Qualidea Code, and the single also includes the song "AxxxiS", which was used as the second opening theme to Qualidea Code, on August 24, 2016. She released the single "Catch the Moment" on February 15, 2017; the title track was used as the theme song to the 2017 anime film Sword Art Online The Movie: Ordinal Scale. Lisa moved to the Sacra Music record label under Sony Music Entertainment Japan in April 2017. She released her fourth studio album Little Devil Parade on May 24, 2017. She held a two-day concert at the Saitama Super Arena on June 24 and 25, 2017. She released her single "Datte Atashi no Hero." (だってアタシのヒーロー。; lit. "Because He is My Hero") on August 2, 2017; the song was used as the second ending theme for the second season of the anime series My Hero Academia. Her single "Ash", which was released digitally on October 1, 2017, was used as the second opening theme to the anime television series Fate/Apocrypha; the single received a physical release on November 29, 2017.

Lisa performed "Thrill, Risk, Heartless" as the theme song for the video game Sword Art Online: Fatal Bullet. The song was released digitally on January 9, 2018. She released two compilation albums titled Lisa Best -Day- and Lisa Best -Way- on May 9, 2018. She released a double A-sided single titled "Akai Wana (Who Loves It?) (赤い罠 (who loves it?)) / Adamas" on December 12, 2018. The song "Adamas" was used as the first opening theme to the 2018 anime series Sword Art Online: Alicization; it was released digitally on October 7, 2018. She is featured on Hiroyuki Sawano's song "Narrative", which was used as the ending theme song of the anime film Mobile Suit Gundam Narrative under the name "SawanoHiroyuki[nZk]:Lisa". Her single "Gurenge" (紅蓮華, Red Lotus), used as the first opening theme song for the 2019 anime series Demon Slayer: Kimetsu no Yaiba, was released digitally on April 22, 2019 and received a physical release on July 3, 2019. She collaborated with FictionJunction in performing the song "From the Edge" which is used as the first ending theme to Demon Slayer: Kimetsu no Yaiba. The song was released digitally on September 1, 2019. Her single "Unlasting" was released on December 11, 2019, with the title track being released digitally on October 21, 2019; "Unlasting" was used as the third ending theme to Sword Art Online: Alicization. She appeared at the 2019 Kōhaku Uta Gassen. She released her digital single "Aijō" (愛錠, Love Lock) on August 17, 2020; the song is used as the theme song for Japanese drama series 13. On October 14, 2020, she released her fifth studio album Leo-Nine, (Note: This album was originally scheduled to be released on May 27, 2020, but was delayed due to the COVID-19 pandemic.) and also a single titled "Homura" (炎, Flame); The song was used as the theme song for the anime film Demon Slayer: Kimetsu no Yaiba – The Movie: Mugen Train. "Homura" won the Grand Prix at the 62nd Japan Record Awards.

In July 2020, Lisa's "Gurenge" single surpassed 1 million downloads since its release. The single is the first by a female artist to surpass 1 million downloads in the history of Oricon's digital single ranking chart. It is the third overall single in the chart's history to do so, after Kenshi Yonezu's 2018 single "Lemon", and his 2019 single "Uma to Shika". In October 2020, "Homura" peaked at No. 8 on the Billboard Global 200.

On August 4, 2021, Lisa announced that she would be going on hiatus following reports from Shūkan Bunshun alleging that her husband Tatsuhisa Suzuki had been engaged in an extramarital affair. She later gradually resumed her music activities, beginning with a Hokkaido concert on August 28. She released the single "Hadashi no Step" on September 8, 2021; the title song is used as the theme song to the television drama Promise Cinderella.

=== 2022–present: LiSA's 10th Anniversary ===
On March 24, 2022, Netflix announced that they would stream a documentary film titled Lisa: Another Great Day featuring her career; the film was released on October 18, 2022. In June 2022, Lisa, Abema TV, and TV Asahi announced that the single "Issei no Kassai" would be the theme song for their broadcast of the 2022 FIFA World Cup. The single was released in November 2022.

In May 2023, Lisa announced that she would be singing the theme for the Japanese dubbed version of the CG animated film Spider-Man: Across the Spider-Verse, "Realize", making it her first-ever theme song for a Hollywood film. She collaborated with Stray Kids and released the single "Social Path" which was released in a mini-album on September 6, 2023.

In 2024, she collaborated with B'z guitarist Tak Matsumoto on songs for two different projects: a cover of Ann Lewis' song "Roppongi Shinjū" for his album The Hit Parade II and "The Story of Love" for Tak Matsumoto Group's album TMG II. She also collaborated with Felix from Stray Kids in performing the song "Reawaker" which was used as the opening theme for the second season of Solo Leveling, subtitled Arise from the Shadow. The song was released digitally on January 5, 2025, and physically on March 5. Her song "Yes" was used as the theme song to the 2026 film The Irregular at Magic High School The Movie: Yotsuba Succession Arc.

== Musical style and influences ==
Lisa lists Avril Lavigne, Oasis, Green Day, Paramore, Kesha, and Rihanna as among her musical influences, as well as her time in Chucky. Lisa wrote the lyrics for some of her songs on her Landspace and Launcher albums, as well as the lyrics for the singles "Bright Flight / L. Miranic", "Shirushi", and "Rally Go Round"; "Rally Go Round" was co-written with songwriter Shin Furuya. Lisa was described by Dennis Amith of J!-ENT as a young woman with style, beautiful vocals, and the ability to take on various musical styles.

== Personal life ==
Shūkan Bunshun reported that Lisa and Tatsuhisa Suzuki were engaged in May 2019. In January 2020, the two publicly revealed their relationship and announced they had married. On April 25, 2023, Lisa announced the birth of her first child on an Instagram post.

== Discography ==
- Letters To You (2011)
- Lover"s"mile (2012)
- Landspace (2013)
- Launcher (2015)
- Little Devil Parade (2017)
- Leo-Nine (2020)
- Lander (2022)
- Lace Up (2026)

== Awards and nominations ==
Name of the award ceremony, year presented, category, nominee(s) of the award, and the result of the nomination
Award ceremony	Year	Category	Nominee(s)/work(s)	Result	Ref.
Asian Pop Music Awards	2025	Best Collaboration	"Reawaker"	Nominated	
Billboard Japan Music Awards	2012	Animation Artist of the Year	Lisa	Nominated	
Crunchyroll Anime Awards	2022	Best Ending Sequence	"Shirogane" (from Demon Slayer: Kimetsu no Yaiba Mugen Train Arc)	Won	
Crunchyroll Anime Awards	2026	Best Anime Song	"Reawaker"	Nominated	
Crunchyroll Anime Awards	2026	Best Opening Sequence	"Reawaker"	Nominated	
Grammy Awards	2027	Best Asian Pop Music Performance	"Yes"	Pending	
Japan Gold Disc Award	2020	Best 5 Songs by Download	"Gurenge"	Won	
Japan Record Awards	2020	Grand Prix	"Homura" (from Demon Slayer: Kimetsu no Yaiba the Movie: Mugen Train)	Won	
Japan Record Awards	2021	Song of the Year	"Akeboshi"	Won	
JASRAC Awards	2021	Domestic Works	"Gurenge"	Won	
Music Awards Japan	2026	Best Global Hit from Japan	"Reawaker"	Nominated	
Music Awards Japan	2026	Best Cross-Over Collaboration Song	"Reawaker"	Nominated	
Music Awards Japan	2026	Best Japanese Song in Europe	"Reawaker"	Nominated	
Newtype Anime Awards	2017	Best Theme Song	"Catch the Moment" (from Sword Art Online The Movie: Ordinal Scale)	Won	
Newtype Anime Awards	2019	Best Theme Song	"Gurenge" (from Demon Slayer: Kimetsu no Yaiba)	Won	
