= Shingo Adachi =

Japanese animator

- 足立 慎吾
- Born: Osaka, Japan
- Education: Osaka University of Arts
- Occupations: Animator; character designer; director
- Notable work: Working!!; Sword Art Online; Lycoris Recoil
- Spouse: Haruko Iizuka

Shingo Adachi (Japanese: 足立 慎吾, Hepburn: Adachi Shingo) is a Japanese animator, character designer, and director. He is best known for his work on Sword Art Online, the anime series based on the light novel of the same name.

== Biography ==
Shingo Adachi was born in Osaka, Japan. He is an alumnus of Department of Visual Concept Planning, Osaka University of Arts. At first, he wanted to become a professional manga artist and joined a manga/anime research circle called 'CAS' while he was still in college. He then decided to start his career in the animation industry as in-house animator at Xebec after Mitsuru Ishihara who was his senior in college invited him to join the company. He is currently working as a freelancer animator. On December 31, 2021, it was announced that Adachi is making his directorial debut with the 2022 original television anime Lycoris Recoil at A-1 Pictures.

== Works ==
TV series

- Rockman.EXE Beast+ (2006) – Character Design
- Mega Man Star Force (2006) – Character Design
- Mega Man Star Force Tribe (2007-2008) – Character Design
- Working!! (2010) – Character Design
- Working'!! (2011) – Character Design
- Sword Art Online (2012) – Character Design
- Galilei Donna (2013) – Character Design
- Sword Art Online II (2014) – Character Design
- Working!!! (2015) – Character Design
- Sword Art Online: Alicization (2018-2020) – Character Design
- Lycoris Recoil (2022) – Director

Films

- Sword Art Online the Movie: Ordinal Scale (2017) – Character Design
- Pompo: The Cinéphile (2021) – Character Design
- Sword Art Online the Movie: Integral Domain (2028) – Director
- Wasted Chef (TBA) – Character Design

ONA

- Minarai Diva (2014) – Character Design

Video games

- Xenoblade Chronicles 2 (2017) - Character Design
- Loop8: Summer of Gods (2023) – Character Design
