= Sword Art Online the Movie: Ordinal Scale =

2017 anime film by Tomohiko Itō

- Theatrical release poster

Japanese name
- Kanji: 劇場版 ソードアート・オンライン -オーディナル・スケール-
Transcriptions
- Revised Hepburn: Gekijō-ban Sōdo Āto Onrain -Ōdinaru Sukēru-
- Directed by: Tomohiko Itō
- Screenplay by: Reki Kawahara; Tomohiko Itō
- Based on: Sword Art Online by Reki Kawahara
- Starring: Yoshitsugu Matsuoka; Haruka Tomatsu; Ayana Taketatsu; Kanae Itō; Rina Hidaka; Ayahi Takagaki; Miyuki Sawashiro; Hiroaki Hirata; Hiroki Yasumoto; Kōichi Yamadera; Toshiyuki Morikawa; Sayaka Kanda; Yoshio Inoue; Takeshi Kaga
- Cinematography: Kentarō Waki
- Edited by: Shigeru Nishiyama
- Music by: Yuki Kajiura
- Production company: A-1 Pictures
- Distributed by: Aniplex
- Release date: February 18, 2017
- Running time: 120 minutes
- Country: Japan
- Language: Japanese
- Box office: ¥4.3 billion ($38.3 million)

Sword Art Online the Movie: Ordinal Scale (Japanese: 劇場版 ソードアート・オンライン -オーディナル・スケール-, Hepburn: Gekijō-ban Sōdo Āto Onrain -Ōdinaru Sukēru-) is a 2017 Japanese animated science fiction action adventure film based on the Sword Art Online light novel series written by Reki Kawahara and illustrated by abec. The film is produced by A-1 Pictures and directed by Tomohiko Itō, and is an official part of the Sword Art Online storyline, featuring an original story by Kawahara, character designs by Shingo Adachi, and music by Yuki Kajiura. It was released in Japan, Southeast Asia, and Germany on February 18, 2017, in Mexico on March 4, 2017, and in the United States on March 9, 2017, as it premiered in Hollywood on March 1, 2017. The events of the film take place between the second and third seasons of the Sword Art Online anime series.

== Plot ==
In the year 2026, the Augma is released to the public as an alternative system to the AmuSphere, as it projects a game layer on top of reality while the player is conscious, rather than using FullDive. The most prominent combat-based game is Ordinal Scale, in which a player's abilities are ranked by ordinal numbers.

Asuna, Lisbeth and Silica encourage Kirito to play OS upon hearing that Aincrad bosses have appeared. Kirito joins Asuna and Klein in a boss fight against Kagachi the Samurai Lord at Akihabara, where the game's mascot, AI idol singer Yuna, appears and gives players buff effects as she sings. Kirito fails to achieve anything due to lack of real world physical strength and agility. Eiji, the number-two ranked player, aids the group in defeating the boss. Before Asuna makes the killing blow, Eiji whispers the word "Switch", a game mechanic from SAO that she recognizes.

The next night, Asuna joins Klein and his group for another boss fight at Yoyogi Park while waiting for their last group member, unaware that he was injured by Eiji the night before. Asuna leaves Klein and his guild behind and proceeds to the fight against the Storm Griffin, which is again presided over by Yuna. Klein and his guild are surprised by the sudden appearance of a second boss, Zanghi the Flame Caller, and shockingly supported by Eiji, who physically attacks and defeats Klein and his entire guild in the real world using superior reflexes and seemingly superhuman strength. When Asuna returns to where she left them, Klein and his guild are nowhere to be seen. The following morning, as Kirito practices with OS in Yoyogi Park, a girl he doesn't know appears in a white hood, mouths something wordlessly and points off into the distance before disappearing. A confused Kirito is surprised by Asuna who has arrived to have lunch with him. While eating together, Asuna theorizes that Eiji was a former member of the Knights of the Blood Oath named Nautilus, while Yui deduces that the spawn locations of the Aincrad bosses line up with the SAO dungeon maps. Noting the absence of Klein, Kirito tries to check up on him.

Asuna, Lisbeth and Silica join the boss fight against Strict Hermit at Yebisu Garden Place, where Yuna and Eiji appear again. At the same time, Agil contacts Kirito and tells him that Klein has been hospitalized with a broken arm; Kirito, alarmed, rushes to protect Asuna and their friends. During the boss battle, a second boss, Dorz'l the Chaos Drake, suddenly appears and fixates on Silica. Eiji blocks Silica's escape by pushing her into the path of a lethal boss attack, and Asuna is defeated while protecting her; an orange orb materializes from Asuna and is quickly collected by one of the OS drones. After the battle, Asuna begins to suffer memory loss, and goes to the hospital for examination.

Asuna learns that the Augma device scanned her brain specifically for SAO memories and that the memory loss could worsen. After Asuna's condition worsens, Kirito gains a strong resolve to solve the mystery. Kirito visits Klein in the hospital and confirms that Klein's SAO memories are also missing. Kirito goes to the Dire Tusk boss battle at Tokyo Dome City looking for Eiji, where he is joined by Sinon; although he is concerned for her safety, Sinon reminds Kirito that she is not an SAO survivor. During the boss battle, an SAO survivor is defeated and Kirito witnesses a glowing memory orb being collected by an OS drone. Yui tries to retrieve the memory orb from the drone but fails after being blocked by the OS system. After the battle, Kirito is frustrated that Eiji did not show up, but meets the hooded girl a third time, who repeats her actions from before. Kirito and Yui figure out that she is pointing towards Touto Technical University.

Kirito goes to the university and meets Professor Tetsuhiro Shigemura, who developed Augma. Shigemura refuses to answer any questions. Before leaving, Kirito notices on Shigemura's desk a picture of a girl who resembles Yuna. Kirito talks to Seijirō Kikuoka, who informs him that Shigemura's daughter, Yuna, died in SAO. Kirito warns Kikuoka that the memory loss may be affecting other SAO survivors playing OS. Visiting Asuna's home, Kirito promises Asuna that he will get her memories back. While searching for clues, Kirito encounters the hooded girl yet again, who he confirms is Yuna. When she tells him his rank is too low, Kirito decides to level up hardcore, recklessly chain-soloing as many bosses as he can, and improving his AR swordwork with help from his sister, Leafa.

Days later, the OS players gather at the Tokyo National Stadium for Yuna's first live concert. In the lower levels, Kirito duels with Eiji, who claims he has a way to return Asuna's memories. After Kirito defeats him, Eiji reveals that Shigemura has been harvesting memories of SAO players in an attempt to reconstruct his lost daughter's soul and resurrect her as an AI; having SAO survivors concentrated in one place is the final stage of the plan and Eiji believes he has won. Kirito rushes back upstairs to warn everyone, calling Kikuoka on the way. Kikuoka warns Kirito that all the memory harvesting drones scanning everyone at once could damage the players' brains, killing them like the NerveGear did in SAO.

As a horde of Aincrad bosses appear and terrorize the stadium, Kirito and Yuna join the battle. Yuna tells Kirito that the Augma has a hidden full-dive feature and he can use it to defeat SAO's 100th floor boss to stop the scan and save everyone. Before diving, Kirito gives Asuna a promise ring. Entering the Ruby Palace of Floor 100, Kirito, Lisbeth, Silica, Agil, and Sinon confront the boss. They are easily overwhelmed until Asuna, Leafa, Klein, and several other memorable players from ALO and GGO come to their aid. Yui restores their saved abilities from SAO, allowing everyone to defeat the boss. The voice of Akihiko Kayaba congratulates them on their victory and gives Kirito an extremely powerful sword as a reward.

The group returns to the arena still in full-dive where Kirito, now OS's top-ranked player, effortlessly dispatches the bosses with his new sword. Meanwhile, in the real world, Kikuoka finds Shigemura in the abandoned server room of Argus (the defunct company that once ran SAO) and arrests him. The hooded Yuna restores the survivors' memories and fades out of existence since her existence was tied to that of the Floor 100 boss. Afterwards, Kirito and Asuna fulfill the promise they made to each other in Aincrad, to watch a meteor shower together. Asuna returns Kirito's promise ring, allowing him to properly place it on her finger.

In a post-credits scene, Kikuoka, who was impressed with Shigemura's attempt at AI and soul reconstruction, recruits Shigemura to Rath.

== Voice cast ==
Character	Japanese	English
Kirito / Kazuto Kirigaya	Yoshitsugu Matsuoka	Bryce Papenbrook
Asuna / Asuna Yuuki	Haruka Tomatsu	Cherami Leigh
Leafa / Suguha Kirigaya	Ayana Taketatsu	Cassandra Lee Morris
Yui	Kanae Itō	Stephanie Sheh
Silica / Keiko Ayano	Rina Hidaka	Christine Marie Cabanos
Lisbeth / Rika Shinozaki	Ayahi Takagaki	Sarah Anne Williams
Sinon / Shino Asada	Miyuki Sawashiro	Michelle Ruff
Klein / Ryōtarō Tsuboi	Hiroaki Hirata	Kirk Thornton
Agil / Andrew Gilbert Mills	Hiroki Yasumoto	Patrick Seitz
Akihiko Kayaba	Kōichi Yamadera	Marc Diraison
Seijirō Kikuoka	Toshiyuki Morikawa	Matthew Mercer
Yuna / Yuuna Shigemura	Sayaka Kanda	Ryan Bartley
Nautilus/ Eiji / Eiji Nochizawa	Yoshio Inoue	Chris Patton
Dr. Tetsuhiro Shigemura	Takeshi Kaga	Jamieson Price
Sakuya	Sayuri Yahagi	Lauren Landa
Alice Rue	Chiwa Saito	Cristina Vee
Recon / Shin'ichi Nagata	Ayumu Murase	Marin Miller
Eugene	Kenta Miyake	Joshua Tomar
Siune / An Si-eun	Shimamura Yū	Erika Harlacher
Dyne	Tsuruoka Satoshi	Dan Woren
Dr. Kurahashi	Kiuchi Hidenobu	Robbie Daymond

== Production ==
At the Dengeki Bunko Autumn Festival 2015 on October 4, 2015, it was announced that the light novel series would be adapted into an animated film, with the main staff returning from the anime series. The film takes place after the anime series' second season, Sword Art Online II. It was then revealed at the Dengeki Bunko Haru no Saiten 2016 event on March 13, 2016, that the film is titled Sword Art Online the Movie: Ordinal Scale. The voice cast from the anime series returned to reprise their roles in the film.

The film's soundtrack is composed by Yuki Kajiura, who also composed the music for the anime series. The soundtrack features 50 tracks, including 5 insert songs performed by Sayaka Kanda. It was released by Aniplex on February 22, 2017. Sayaka Kanda performs five songs as Yuna: "Longing", "Delete", "Break Beat Bark!", "Ubiquitous dB" and "Smile For You". LiSA performed the film's theme song, titled "Catch the Moment".

== Release ==
The film premiered in Japan, Southeast Asia and Germany on February 18, 2017. The Asian premieres were distributed by Aniplex and Odex, respectively. There was a premiere event in the United States on March 1, 2017; Eleven Arts and Sony Pictures distributed and released the film in U.S. theaters on March 9, 2017. Madman Entertainment also released the film at theaters in Australia and New Zealand on March 9, 2017. Aniplex of America released the film at theaters in Canada between March 17 and March 19, 2017. The English dub premiered at Anime Boston 2017, Sony Pictures made its national release on April 22. Anime Limited brought the film to cinemas in the United Kingdom and Ireland on April 19, 2017. The film was set to play in about 1,000 theaters worldwide.

A few days after the world premiere, a leak of the film was found online, tracing the source back to Malaysia and Singapore.

The Blu-ray and DVD home video release volumes of Sword Art Online the Movie: Ordinal Scale were released in Japan on September 27, 2017, and North America on December 19, 2017. The Japanese home video release features a sequel novel titled Sword Art Online: Cordial Chords written by Kawahara and illustrated by abec, set eight days after the events of Ordinal Scale.

== Reception ==
=== Box office ===
The film on its opening weekend opened at No. 1 at the Japanese box office, debuting in 151 theaters across Japan and grossed ¥425 million from 308,376 admissions. It went on to gross a total of ¥2.52 billion ($22,466,673) in Japan by the end of 2017.

In China, the film has grossed CN¥53.95 million. It grossed over $1.35 million in its first weekend in North America, and went on to gross $1,522,976 in the United States and Canada. During its first day in Italy, the film beat out both Pirates of the Caribbean: Dead Men Tell No Tales and Wonder Woman at the box office.

By October 1, 2017, the film had grossed a total of over ¥4.3 billion ($38.3 million) worldwide. After October 5, 2017, the film grossed a further $41,652 in China, and $14,702 in Argentina, for a worldwide total of $38,256,354.

=== Critical response ===
The review aggregator Rotten Tomatoes reported that 100% of critics have given the film a positive review based on 5 reviews, with an average rating of 7.62/10.

A review coming from Cine Premier's Julio Vélez scored it a 4/5 and stated: "The second act falls a little in action by focusing more on defining the motives of the antagonists, but everything recovers in an exciting and prolonged climax". In a review featured on the anime streaming website Crunchyroll, Isaac Akers states "SAO being SAO, this was never going to be a perfectly crafted movie—but it captures so many of the charms of the franchise whilst also avoiding nearly all of its most aggravating faults."

Alex Osborn of IGN gave the film a mixed-to-positive review, writing, "while Sword Art Online The Movie: Ordinal Scale won't likely create many new fans," it ultimately "serves up a solid original story" that offers an "intriguing and incredibly relevant" commentary on augmented reality alongside an emotionally rousing musical score. Darkstorm of Anime UK News called it a "fun romp" and a love letter to fans, celebrating its inventive AR-driven spectacle, large-scale combat and big-budget animation alongside the surprisingly tender portrayal of Kirito and Asuna, while conceding its villains are underwritten and the premise sometimes strains credibility.

Theron Martin from Anime News Network also gave the film a mixed-to-positive review, commending its "pitched battles," delightful character cameos, and a flawless "soundtrack," while noting that the plot is not "where its real entertainment value lies" due to a repeating storyline that mimics the franchise's past narrative beats.

=== Accolades ===
The film was nominated in two categories at the 6th Behind the Voice Actors (BTVA) Anime Dub Awards, for "Best Male Lead Performance in an Anime Movie/Special" (Bryce Papenbrook – "Kazuto "Kirito" Kirigaya") and "Best Female Lead Vocal Performance in an Anime Movie/Special" (Ryan Bartley – "Yuna"). It was also nominated in the category at the 4th Anime Trending Awards, for "Anime Movie of the Year."

== In other media ==
Yuna makes her first video game appearance in Accel World VS. Sword Art Online as a DLC playable character. She later makes her second DLC appearance in Sword Art Online: Fatal Bullet alongside game original character Seven and Eiji, the latter making his video game debut in Fatal Bullet.
