= Sword Art Online season 1 =

Sword Art Online
- Season 1
- Cover of the first DVD volume as released by Aniplex of America
- No. of episodes: 25 + 1 special

Release
- Original network: Tokyo MX
- Original release: July 8 – December 23, 2012

Season chronology
- Next → Sword Art Online II

Sword Art Online is a Japanese science fiction anime television series based on the light novel series of the same title written by Reki Kawahara and illustrated by abec, produced by A-1 Pictures, and directed by Tomohiko Itō. It is divided into the "Aincrad" and "Fairy Dance" arcs, adapted from volumes 1–4 from the light novels. The story of the first season follows the adventures of Kazuto "Kirito" Kirigaya and Asuna Yuuki, two players who are trapped in the virtual world of "Sword Art Online" (SAO). They are tasked to clear all 100 Floors and defeat the final boss in order to be freed from the game. Three months after the death game, Kazuto discovers that Asuna is being held captive in "Alfheim Online" (ALO), a spiritual successor to SAO, where the players assume the roles of fairies. Kazuto enters the game and allies himself with his sister Suguha "Leafa" Kirigaya to rescue Asuna from captivity.

The season aired from July 8 to December 23, 2012, on Tokyo MX, spanning 25 episodes. It was later broadcast by 12 other stations. Aniplex of America announced that the English dubbed version would air on Adult Swim's Toonami programming block starting on July 28, 2013. The first DVD and Blu-ray Disc volumes were released in Japan on October 24, 2012, and it concluded on June 26, 2013, with all nine volumes containing a bonus Sword Art Offline (ソードアート・オフライン, Sōdo Āto Ofurain) episode. In North America, Aniplex of America released the series in four Blu-ray/DVD volumes on August 13, 2013. In Australasia, Madman Entertainment distributed the four volumes in DVD and Blu-ray format. In Europe, Manga Entertainment first released all four volumes on December 16, 2013. A special episode of the anime titled Sword Art Online: Extra Edition (ソードアート・オンライン Extra Edition, Sōdo Āto Onrain Ekisutora Edishon) was globally released on December 31, 2013. A second season, titled Sword Art Online II, began airing in July 2014.

Five pieces of theme music were used for the series: two opening themes and three ending themes. For the first 14 episodes, the opening theme song is "Crossing Field" performed by Lisa, and the ending theme is "Yume Sekai" (ユメセカイ; lit. 'Dream World') performed by Haruka Tomatsu. The second opening theme, used from episode 15 onwards, is "Innocence" performed by Eir Aoi, while its second ending theme, used from episodes 15 to 24, is "Overfly" performed by Luna Haruna. The third ending theme, "Crossing Field" was used for the final episode. The extra edition's main theme is "Niji no Oto" (虹の音, Sound of the Rainbow) by Eir Aoi. The original score for the series is composed by Yuki Kajiura.

== Episodes ==
=== Sword Art Online ===
Story	Episode	Title	Directed by	Written by	Original release date (Note: Tokyo MX lists the series as premiering at 24:00 on Saturday, which is effectively Sunday at 12:00 a.m. JST.)	English air date (Note: Adult Swim lists the series as premiering at 2:00 a.m. ET/PT on Saturday, which is effectively Sunday.)	Ref.
Story arc 1: Aincrad
1	1	"The World of Swords"; Transliteration: "Ken no Sekai" (Japanese: 剣の世界)	Tomohiko Itō	Yukie Sugawara, Yukito Kizawa	July 8, 2012	July 28, 2013	
A virtual reality gaming console known as the "NerveGear" is released to the public alongside the world's first virtual reality game called "Sword Art Online" (SAO). A beta tester named Kirito logs in and visits Aincrad, the setting where the game takes place. He quickly befriends a novice player named Klein, to whom he teaches the basics of the game, including how to defeat a boar. A few hours later, Kirito and Klein discover that they cannot log out. Akihiko Kayaba, the game's creator and employee of the computer corporation Argus, announces to the players that he intentionally removed the option to log out and that players will die if either their NerveGear helmet is forcefully removed or their in-game health bar is depleted to zero. He also admits that he created this game as a way to become god over his own dominion, and that the only way to log out of the game is to clear all of Aincrad's 100 Floors. While Klein remains behind to help his friends, Kirito rushes to level up and become stronger before the best grinding areas are taken by other players.
2	2	"Beater"; Transliteration: "Bītā" (Japanese: ビーター)	Yoshiyuki Fujiwara	Munemasa Nakamoto	July 15, 2012	August 4, 2013	
One month later, over 2,000 players are already dead. Kirito attends a meeting organized by fellow beta tester Diabel, who announces that his party has discovered the 1st Floor's boss, Illfang the Kobold Lord. As players partner up to prepare for battle, Kirito teams up with a mysterious girl named Asuna. The next day, Diabel and the players arrive at the boss room and battle Illfang and his minions. When Illfang's health becomes low, Diabel goes for the finishing attack. Unknown to him, Illfang's weapon has changed since the beta; he is surprised and mortally wounded. With his dying breath, Diabel tells Kirito to defeat the boss and save the players at all costs. After Kirito successfully defeats Illfang, the other players accuse Kirito of killing Diabel by having previous knowledge about Illfang he did not share. They label him a "beater", a combination of "beta tester" and "cheater". Kirito accepts the title and claims the prize for defeating Illfang: a black leather trench coat. He then becomes the first player to clear the 1st Floor by stepping through the gate.
3	3	"The Red-Nosed Reindeer"; Transliteration: "Akahana no Tonakai" (赤鼻のトナカイ)	Yuuki Itohafrer	Yukie Sugawara	July 22, 2012	August 11, 2013	
Kirito joins a guild named the Moonlit Black Cats, but keeps his character level a secret, as it is much higher than the other guild members. Sachi, a member of the guild, admits to Kirito that she is afraid of dying, but Kirito reassures her. As Keita, the guild's leader, leaves to buy a house for the guild, Kirito and the other guild members go to the 27th Floor, where they find and open a treasure chest. This triggers a trap, summoning an army of monsters to surround Kirito and the guild. Kirito watches helplessly as the entire guild, including Sachi, are killed by the monsters, leaving him as the only survivor. Keita commits suicide after learning of his guild's death and Kirito's higher level. Afterwards, Kirito travels to the 35th Floor, where he defeats a secret boss named Nicholas the Renegade to obtain an item capable of reviving a dead player. However, Kirito gives the item to Klein after learning it is only effective within ten seconds of a player's death. Later that night, Kirito receives a pre-recorded message from Sachi, telling him to not blame himself and to keep living.
4	4	"The Black Swordsman"; Transliteration: "Kuro no Kenshi" (Japanese: 黒の剣士)	Shinya Watada	Yoshikazu Mukai	July 29, 2012	August 18, 2013	
A female beast tamer named Silica leaves her party after a dispute and walks through a forest, only to be ambushed by a group of apes. Silica's dragon familiar, Pina, is killed while trying to protect her, but Kirito arrives to save Silica and kill the apes. Kirito agrees to take Silica to the 47th Floor to retrieve an item that can revive in-game creatures like Pina within three days. He warns her of the existence of "orange players" who commit crimes and "red players" who commit murder. After they fight off a plant monster and retrieve the item, they are confronted by Rosalia, leader of a guild named Titan's Hand, a party of orange players. Kirito reveals he escorted Silica to lure and arrest Titan's Hand. Thanks to an ability that regenerates his health bar, Kirito effortlessly outmatches and detains the guild members. Silica later thanks Kirito for his help and uses the item to revive Pina.
5	5	"Murder in the Safe Zone"; Transliteration: "Kennai Jiken" (Japanese: 圏内事件)	Yasuyuki Fuse	Yukito Kizawa	August 5, 2012	August 25, 2013	
On the 56th Floor, Asuna proposes a plan to lure a boss into a village, but Kirito opposes the idea since it may involve the deaths of non-player character villagers. On the 59th Floor, Kirito persuades Asuna to rest and relax in a field one afternoon; as thanks for watching over her while she slept, she repays him with dinner at a restaurant. Their dinner is interrupted when they hear a scream. They rush outside to a church, where a player named Caynz has been hanged from a noose and impaled with a spear before dying. As Kirito and Asuna investigate the murder, they deduce that there may be an unknown player killer. They also learn that Caynz and his girlfriend Yolko were formerly members of a now-disbanded guild called Golden Apple. They find out from a merchant, Agil, that the spear used in the murder was forged by Grimlock, who is the husband of Griselda, the leader of the Golden Apple. Griselda was killed six months previously while attempting to sell a valuable ring she obtained from defeating a boss. After realizing that the killer may be targeting the guild members who voted to sell the ring, Yolko is abruptly killed by a knife thrown through the window.
6	6	"Illusionary Avenger"; Transliteration: "Maboroshi no Fukushū-sha" (Japanese: 幻の復讐者)	Kazuma Satō	Yukito Kizawa	August 12, 2012	September 8, 2013	
Kirito fails to pursue a black-robed suspect, who uses a teleport crystal to escape. Later, Kirito accidentally drops a sandwich, which disappears in a way similar to a player death animation. He realizes that Caynz and Yolko faked their deaths by using a teleport crystal to disappear at the same time they destroyed an item. Meanwhile, at Griselda's grave, Yolko and Caynz disguise themselves and interrogate a former guild member named Schmitt to see if he killed Griselda, but he pleads and proves his innocence. Yolko, Caynz, and Schmitt are approached by members of Laughing Coffin, a guild of red players who murder other players for fun, but Kirito arrives and forces them to retreat. Kirito explains that Grimlock wanted Griselda dead to acquire the ring for himself. Asuna apprehends Grimlock, who confesses that Griselda was happier in the virtual world compared to the real world, so he killed her thinking that she might one day leave him. He also hired the Laughing Coffin members to eliminate anyone who might learn the truth. After Yolko, Caynz, Schmitt, and Grimlock leave, Kirito and Asuna briefly see Griselda by her grave.
7	7	"The Temperature of the Heart"; Transliteration: "Kokoro no Ondo" (Japanese: 心の温度)	Makoto Hoshino	Yoshikazu Mukai	August 19, 2012	September 15, 2013	
On the 48th Floor, Kirito meets Asuna's friend Lisbeth in her blacksmith shop to request a custom-made sword. Lisbeth is shocked when she finds that Kirito's current sword, Elucidator, is durable enough to destroy the strongest sword she has ever forged. She persuades Kirito to take her to the 55th Floor to get a rare mineral that she can use to make an even stronger sword. They arrive at the 55th Floor and find the rare mineral inside the deep pit of a crystal dragon's nest. During their time together, Lisbeth develops romantic feelings for Kirito, which are strengthened when Kirito defeats the crystal dragon and escorts her to safety. Lisbeth uses the rare mineral to forge a new sword for Kirito named Dark Repulsor. As she then attempts to confess her love to Kirito, Asuna arrives and interrupts them. Lisbeth becomes heartbroken and runs away when she realizes that Kirito and Asuna have mutual romantic feelings for each other. Kirito later finds Lisbeth at a riverbank and thanks her for the time that they spent together. Lisbeth welcomes Kirito to come to her blacksmith shop whenever he needs anything.
8	8	"The Sword Dance of Black and White"; Transliteration: "Kuro to Shiro no Kenbu" (Japanese: 黒と白の剣舞)	Tatsumi Fujii	Shuji Iriyama	August 26, 2012	September 22, 2013	
On the 74th Floor, Kirito hunts down a rare rabbit that contains high quality meat. Kirito attempts to sell it to Agil, but when Asuna arrives, he decides to let her cook it, since she has excellent cooking skills. Asuna's escort, Kuradeel, opposes Asuna inviting Kirito to her home after he learns that Kirito is a "beater", but Asuna disregards him. On the 61st Floor, Asuna and Kirito eat the meal Asuna prepared. Asuna convinces Kirito to team up with her, despite him preferring to be a solo player. The next day, they head back to the 74th Floor, where Kuradeel challenges Kirito to a duel to prove who can best protect Asuna. Kirito easily defeats Kuradeel by breaking his sword. Kuradeel refuses to admit that he lost to a beater and accuses Kirito of cheating. Asuna uses her authority as the second-in-command of her notorious guild, the Knights of the Blood Oath, to order Kuradeel to return to the guild's headquarters. Kirito and Asuna later clear the dungeon and discover the boss room on the 74th Floor.
9	9	"The Blue-Eyed Demon"; Transliteration: "Seigan no Akuma" (Japanese: 青眼の悪魔)	Koichi Kikuta	Munemasa Nakamoto, Naoki Shōji	September 2, 2012	September 29, 2013	
Kirito and Asuna flee the boss room upon seeing the Gleam Eyes. They encounter Klein and his guild, Fuurinkazan. A player named Kobatz and his guild called the Aincrad Liberation Force appear and demand a map of the dungeon. Kirito complies, despite Asuna and Klein's objections. Kirito, Asuna, and Klein return to the boss room, only to find Kobatz dead and the Aincrad Liberation Force badly injured. The trio charge at the Gleam Eyes, but find it is too difficult to defeat. Kirito is forced to reveal his secret unique skill, dual wielding, to defeat the Gleam Eyes. After the battle, Kirito collapses from loss of health as Asuna embraces him. News of Kirito's unique dual wielding attracts the attention of Heathcliff, leader of the Knights of the Blood Oath, who challenges Kirito to a duel. If Kirito wins, Asuna can quit the guild, but if Kirito loses, he must join the guild.
10	10	"Crimson Killing Intent"; Transliteration: "Kurenai no Satsui" (Japanese: 紅の殺意)	Hideya Takahashi	Yukito Kizawa	September 9, 2012	October 6, 2013	
On the 75th Floor, Asuna warns Kirito that Heathcliff has a skill which grants him maximum strength with his sword and defense with his shield. During the duel, Kirito attempts to strike Heathcliff, but the latter manages to parry the attack and claim victory. Later, having joined the Knights of the Blood Oath due to the terms of the duel, Kirito confides in Asuna that he avoided joining guilds because of the incident with the Moonlit Black Cats. Fellow guild member Godfree summons Kirito and Kuradeel, taking them through a canyon to a dungeon on the 55th Floor for a skill assessment. As they stop to take a break, Kirito and Godfree realize that Kuradeel tainted the water to paralyze them. After brutally murdering Godfree, Kuradeel reveals himself as a member of Laughing Coffin. As Kuradeel tortures Kirito, Asuna arrives just before Kirito runs out of health and gives him an antidote crystal. Kuradeel deceitfully surrenders to Asuna and tries to attack, but Kirito defends Asuna and kills Kuradeel. Asuna blames herself and tells Kirito to stay away from her for his sake, but Kirito stops Asuna and kisses her, promising to never leave her. Kirito asks to stay the night with Asuna at her house, where they agree to marry.
11	11	"Girl of the Morning Dew"; Transliteration: "Asatsuyu no Shōjo" (Japanese: 朝露の少女)	Pyeon-Gang Ho	Yukie Sugawara	September 16, 2012	October 13, 2013	
Kirito and Asuna have an online marriage and are granted a temporary leave from the Knights of the Blood Oath to go on a honeymoon in a log cabin on the 22nd Floor. As they venture deep inside a nearby forest, they find a lost girl who suddenly collapses. They realize that there may be a possible glitch since the girl does not have a cursor above her and take her back to their log cabin for the night. The next day, the girl wakes up, remembers her name as Yui, and decides to refer to Kirito and Asuna as her parents. The three go to the 1st Floor to find out if anyone is searching for Yui. They encounter the Aincrad Liberation Force extorting taxes from a daycare owner named Sasha and three of the children in her care. Asuna intimidates the Aincrad Liberation Force with her sword, causing them to retreat. Yui starts to panic and momentarily glitches before being falling unconscious again.
12	12	"Yui's Heart"; Transliteration: "Yui no Kokoro" (Japanese: ユイの心)	Tamaki Nakatsu	Yukie Sugawara	September 23, 2012	October 20, 2013	
At the daycare center inside a church, Kirito, Asuna, Yui, and Sasha are visited by Yulier, second-in-command of the Aincrad Liberation Force. Yulier explains that Thinker, leader of the Aincrad Liberation Force, was overthrown by Kibaou, who trapped Thinker in a dungeon on the 1st Floor three days earlier. Kirito, Asuna, and Yui agree to help Yulier rescue Thinker. As they clear the dungeon and find Thinker, they are ambushed by a boss named the Fatal Scythe. Kirito and Asuna attempt to fight the Fatal Scythe, but are completely outmatched and overwhelmed. Yui steps in and destroys the Fatal Scythe in a ball of fire, revealing that she is an indestructible in-game object. Kirito and Asuna discover that Yui is an artificial intelligence character designed to aid the players, but was forced to monitor them instead. Yui admits that she felt like a daughter to Kirito and Asuna when she interacted with them. Yui is sentenced to deletion due to her interference with the game, but Kirito manages to use the gamemaster console to save Yui from complete deletion by transforming her data into an in-game item, a crystal drop that he gives to Asuna.
13	13	"Edge of Hell's Abyss"; Transliteration: "Naraku no Fuchi" (Japanese: 奈落の淵)	Takahiro Shikama	Yoshikazu Mukai	September 30, 2012	October 27, 2013	
While fishing near a lake, Kirito encounters Nishida, an avid fisherman. He remarks that, despite honing his fisherman skills, he is unable to cook delicious dishes with what he catches. Kirito invites him to his home for Asuna to cook the fish he caught for them. During their meal, Nishida mentions to Kirito that he tried to catch a huge fish so many times before but failed, and asks Kirito to help him. Later, Nishida manages to hook the fish and passes the rod to Kirito to reel it in. The fish is revealed to be a huge monster, which Asuna defeats. Soon after, Kirito receives a message from Heathcliff. Before leaving Nishida, Asuna recounts how she developed feelings for Kirito over time. Kirito and Asuna meet up at the guild's headquarters, where they learn that a party of twenty guild members had been trapped and killed in the boss room of the 75th Floor. A team of players from several guilds, including Kirito, Asuna, Klein, and Agil, is assembled. Once inside, the team battles the terrifying boss of the 75th Floor, the Skull Reaper.
14	14	"The End of the World"; Transliteration: "Sekai no Shūen" (Japanese: 世界の終焉)	Tomohiko Itō	Yukito Kizawa	October 7, 2012	November 3, 2013	
After the Skull Reaper is finally defeated, Kirito deduces that Heathcliff is secretly Akihiko Kayaba's avatar and the boss of the 100th Floor. Heathcliff paralyzes everyone except Kirito and challenges him to a duel, promising that the remaining players will be freed from the game if Kirito wins. Kirito accepts and fights Heathcliff. When Heathcliff prepares to make a finishing blow after destroying Kirito's Dark Repulser, Asuna jumps between them and sacrifices herself, leaving him grief-stricken over her death. Heathcliff reduces Kirito's health to zero, but Kirito continues to fight and defeats Heathcliff by stabbing him using Asuna's Lambent Light, thus clearing the game. On a floating platform over Aincrad, Akihiko explains to Kirito and Asuna that he wanted to create a world that everyone imagined in their hearts. He congratulates them on clearing the game and bids them farewell. Kirito and Asuna tell one another their real names and embrace as the world falls apart. In the real world, Kirito wakes in a hospital and sets off to find Asuna.
Story arc 2: Fairy Dance
15	15	"Return"; Transliteration: "Kikan" (Japanese: 帰還)	Shigetaka Ikeda	Munemasa Nakamoto	October 14, 2012	November 10, 2013	
Two months later, Kazuto Kirigaya aka Kazuto Narusaka and his adoptive sister Suguha Kirigaya have a kendo match, but he loses due to his sword stance and fighting style being ineffective outside the virtual reality environment. Kazuto goes to the hospital to visit Asuna Yuuki, who has yet to wake up from her coma, along with 300 other players. Kazuto meets Asuna's father Shōzō Yuuki, CEO of computer corporation RECT Progress Inc., and his associate Nobuyuki Sugō, who intends to marry Asuna while she is in her comatose state, much to Kazuto's fury. Later at home, Kazuto breaks down before Suguha, who comforts him. Suguha recalls her mother Midori Kirigaya saying that Kazuto is actually her cousin and harbors her own feelings for him. The next morning, Kazuto receives an e-mail from Andrew Gilbert Mills with a screenshot from another game of an avatar that resembles "Asuna".
16	16	"Land of the Fairies"; Transliteration: "Yōsei-tachi no Kuni" (Japanese: 妖精たちの国)	Yasuyuki Fuse	Yukie Sugawara	October 21, 2012	November 17, 2013	
Kazuto visits Andrew, the real-life persona of Agil, who explains that the screenshot originated from "Alfheim Online" (ALO), a virtual reality game where players take the role of fairies capable of flight. He explains that the avatar resembling Asuna was spotted somewhere on the World Tree. Discovering that RECT Progress Inc. created the game, Kazuto is convinced that when Asuna logged out of SAO, she was somehow trapped in ALO. Wasting no time, Kazuto logs in to ALO as "Kirito" and selects the shadow fairy Spriggan as his avatar. He discovers that he still has his SAO game data, including skill levels and the SAO in-game item containing the data of Yui, which he activates to bring Yui into ALO as a Navigation Pixie. Yui deduces that the game was made using a copy of SAO's servers, explaining why Kirito's statistics from SAO had been carried over to ALO. After Yui teaches Kirito how to fly using a controller, he assists a wind fairy Sylph player named Leafa in defeating three fire fairy Salamanders, led by lance squad captain Kagemune.
17	17	"Captive Queen"; Transliteration: "Toraware no Joō" (Japanese: 囚われの女王)	Yoshiyuki Fujiwara	Yoshikazu Mukai	October 28, 2012	November 24, 2013	
Leafa thanks Kirito for saving her from the attack and teaches him how to fly properly without using a controller. They travel to Sylvein, where they meet one of Leafa's party members, Recon. Kirito and Leafa go to an inn and have a conversation about how he can get to the top of the World Tree. Seeing Kirito's determination to reach the top of the tree, Leafa decides to help and asks him to meet her at the inn the next day. When Leafa logs out into the real world, she is revealed to be Suguha. Meanwhile, Asuna is seen in a gigantic cage at the World Tree, held by the gamemaster, Oberon the Fairy King, revealed to be Sugō in the real world. Asuna is shocked that Oberon wants to control the minds of the 300 comatose SAO players. When Oberon leaves, Asuna hopes that Kirito will save her.
18	18	"To the World Tree"; Transliteration: "Sekaiju e" (Japanese: 世界樹へ)	Takayoshi Morimiya	Yukito Kizawa	November 4, 2012	December 1, 2013	
In the real world, Suguha reminisces about how she started virtual reality gaming and meets up with classmate Shin'ichi Nagata, real-life persona of Recon. She informs him that she will be leaving their party to join Kirito. Later, she logs in as Leafa and begins to lead Kirito to the World Tree, which stands in the center of Alfheim. However, before their departure, a member of Leafa's party, Sigurd, is disappointed that she betrayed her other members. Annoyed about how Sigurd treats Kirito, Leafa announces that Kirito is her new partner. Meanwhile, Asuna learns from Oberon that Kirito is still alive, and she peeks at the key code which unlocks her cage as Oberon leaves. Later during their travels, Kirito and Leafa arrive at a landing point, where they take turns logging out to refresh themselves.
19	19	"The Legrue Corridor"; Transliteration: "Rugurū Kairō" (Japanese: ルグルー回廊)	Pyeon-Gang Ho	Shuji Iriyama	November 11, 2012	January 5, 2014 (Note: TV Guide errorously stated that the English version of "The Lugru Corridor" was originally aired on the night of December 28–29, 2013, but Toonami did not air this episode on that night.)	
While en route to the World Tree, Kirito and Leafa first pass through a large cave in the Legrue Corridor. Leafa receives an incomplete message from Recon, telling her to be careful. When Kirito and Leafa realize that they are being followed, they are cornered by a large group of Salamanders in the mage squad at a bridge. Kirito takes on the group by himself, unable to break their formation. Yui tells Leafa to cast some protective magic on Kirito, while he conjures an illusion spell that temporarily transforms him into a representation of the Gleam Eyes. In his new form, Kirito obliterates his enemies, but spares one whom Kirito bribes with game items in exchange for information. The Salamander reveals that his party was ordered by Kagemune to attack Kirito and Leafa. In the real world, Suguha contacts Shin'ichi, who says that Sigurd is really a spy for the Salamanders, in which they plan on attacking the Sylphs and the cat fairy Cat Siths. Back in the virtual world, Leafa informs Kirito about this, and the two hurry to Butterfly Valley.
20	20	"General of the Blazing Flame"; Transliteration: "Mōen no Shō" (Japanese: 猛炎の将)	Makoto Hoshino, Takahiro Shikama	Naoki Shōji	November 18, 2012	January 12, 2014	
Kirito and Leafa interrupt the attack from happening, in which Kirito rushes forward and addresses Eugene, the general of the Salamanders. Kirito bluffs his position as an ambassador for the alliance between the Spriggans and the water fairy Undines, cautioning Eugene of a potential declaration of war against all four races. Due to disbelief, Eugene challenges Kirito to a duel, but Kirito, having borrowed Leafa's sword, wins using his duel wielding technique, forcing the Salamanders to retreat. Sakuya, leader of the Sylphs, contacts Sigurd and banishes him from the race for his betrayal. Since the Sylphs and Cat Siths are now in an alliance and plan to assault the World Tree in a few days, Kirito donates a large sum of money to Alicia Rue, leader of the Cat Siths, before he and Leafa continue their journey to the World Tree. Meanwhile, Asuna escapes from her cage to find a way out of the World Tree.
21	21	"The Truth About Alfheim"; Transliteration: "Aruvuheimu no Shinjitsu" (Japanese: アルヴヘイムの真実)	Pyeon-Gang Ho	Munemasa Nakamoto	November 25, 2012	January 19, 2014	
Kirito and Leafa finally reach Central Arun, the capital of Alfheim, located directly beneath the World Tree. However, an emergency shutdown for server maintenance prompts the two to find a nearby inn and log out. The next day, Suguha accompanies Kazuto to visit Asuna at the hospital. On the way there, he tells her that he will be put in a special school for students who were formerly SAO players to catch up on the school they missed while logged in to SAO. Meanwhile, Asuna stumbles upon a laboratory inside the World Tree, eventually finding the room where experiments are being conducted with the brains of the 300 comatose SAO players trapped in ALO. She attempts to log out of the game by using the gamemaster console inside the room, but is captured by two of Oberon's assistants. However, she manages to snatch a key card before she is thrown back into her cage. Yui informs Kirito and Leafa that Asuna is at the top of the World Tree.
22	22	"The Grand Quest"; Transliteration: "Gurando Kuesuto" (Japanese: グランド・クエスト)	Kazuhisa Ouno	Yukito Kizawa	December 2, 2012	January 26, 2014	
Kirito rushes towards the top of the World Tree, but finds it blocked by a barrier. Yui desperately calls out to Asuna, in which the latter drops down the key card in response. Once Kirito catches the key card, which can be used to access the gamemaster console, Yui is certain that it came from Asuna. Kirito bids farewell to Leafa and embarks on the Grand Quest by himself, entering inside the dome filled with Guardian Knights. Despite his best efforts, Kirito is overwhelmed by the Guardian Knights and runs out of health. Shortly afterwards, Leafa enters the dome and grabs Kirito's Remain Light, his soul of flame left behind, before successfully escaping to revive him. Leafa attempts to talk Kirito out of reentering the dome alone, but he remains determined and inadvertently mention "Asuna". Leafa then realised that Kirito is Kazuto's avatar, and log out in despair. In the real world, Kazuto approaches Suguha, who reveals in great anguish that she knew they were not true siblings and that she has fallen in love with both him and his avatar.
23	23	"Bonds"; Transliteration: "Kizuna" (Japanese: 絆)	Shigetaka Ikeda	Yoshikazu Mukai	December 9, 2012	February 2, 2014	
Kazuto thinks back to the time when he was ten years old and learned that he was not related to Suguha, which resulted in him becoming detached from his family and increasingly engrossed with online gaming. Wanting to sort things out, Kazuto asks Suguha to meet him in ALO. As Leafa contemplates whether she should stop seeing her brother in-game, she challenges Kirito to a one-on-one duel. They both end up throwing away their swords and apologize to each other. After Kazuto explains that he is unable to say what he thinks of Suguha until Asuna is rescued, Leafa agrees to help him in the Grand Quest this time around, convincing Recon to join them as well. Just as things begin to look dire against the Guardian Knights inside the dome, the Sylphs and the Cat Siths arrive to help. Using his sword combined with Leafa's sword, Kirito breaks through the top of the dome. Yui guides Kirito in using the key card to open the gate to the top of the World Tree.
24	24	"Gilded Hero"; Transliteration: "Mekki no Yūsha" (Japanese: 鍍金の勇者)	Tomohiko Itō	Yukie Sugawara	December 16, 2012	February 9, 2014	
Arriving at the top of the World Tree, Kirito and Yui finally reunite with Asuna. However, they are suddenly hit by high gravity magic, which forces Yui to retreat, and they are confronted by Oberon. As Oberon reveals that his mind control experiments are almost complete, he chains Asuna and molests her in front of Kirito. Falling into despair, Kirito hears the voice of Akihiko, who encourages him to stand up and fight. Using Akihiko's administrative functions, Kirito removes Oberon's powers and challenges him to a fight with no pain absorption, and shows Oberon the true meaning of pain before destroying him. After logging Asuna out to ensure her safety in the real world, Kirito meets with a remnant of Akihiko's memory, who gives him an item called the World Seed before leaving. Kirito respawns back at the World Tree, where Yui returns after hiding inside of Kirito's NerveGear storage. Kirito logs out of ALO, and in the real world, Kazuto heads to the hospital where Asuna is waiting.
25	25	"The World Seed"; Transliteration: "Sekai no Shushi" (Japanese: 世界の種子)	Tomohiko Itō	Munemasa Nakamoto	December 23, 2012	February 16, 2014	
Upon arriving outside the hospital, Kazuto is attacked by Sugō wielding a knife. Sugō decided to kill Kazuto for what he did to him. However, his poor eyesight prevents him from killing Kazuto, who disarms Sugō by taking the knife, then lacerates his neck, and ultimately spares his life to sell him out to the police to arrest him. Kazuto and Asuna reunite and share a kiss in her hospital room. The two attend the special school for students who were formerly SAO players. The police arrested Sugō for his cybercrimes, the 300 SAO players were released from the hospital, RECT Progress Inc. was dismantled and ALO was shut down. Akihiko committed suicide by using his NerveGear after SAO had collapsed. Kazuto, Asuna and Suguha visit Andrew at his café, where Ryōtarō "Klein" Tsuboi, Keiko "Silica" Ayano, Rika "Lisbeth" Shinozaki, Yolko, Kains, Yulier, Thinker and Sasha congratulate Kazuto for completing SAO and ALO. The World Seed created by Akihiko is a program package replacing the Cardinal System, the game system for SAO and ALO, thus reviving the virtual reality gaming genre. Suguha as Leafa returns to Alfheim, and Kazuto as Kirito catches her in midair when she falls from flying too high. After the two dance in the sky, Kirito takes Leafa to New Aincrad, vowing to start from scratch and clear all 100 Floors of this floating castle.

=== Sword Art Online: Extra Edition ===
Sword Art Online: Extra Edition is a special anime episode which was simulcast worldwide on December 31, 2013. In Japan, it was premiered on two broadcast channels: Tokyo MX and BS11. While in other countries, the special was streamed via the Internet on Daisuki and Crunchyroll. The extra edition was directed by Tomohiko Itō and screenplayed by the creator, Reki Kawahara, and Munemasa Nakamoto. It recounts the events of the original Sword Art Online anime, told in retrospect by the series characters and features new footage.

The main theme song is "Niji no Oto" (虹の音, Sound of the Rainbow) by Eir Aoi. "Crossing Field" by LiSA, "Overfly" by Luna Haruna, and "Innocence" by Eir Aoi are all insert songs.

Episode	Title	Directed by	Written by	Original release date	English release date
Special	"Sword Art Online: Extra Edition"; Transliteration: "Sōdo Āto Onrain: Ekisutora Edishon" (Japanese: ソードアート・オンライン Extra Edition)	Tomohiko Itō	Reki Kawahara, Munemasa Nakamoto	December 31, 2013	December 23, 2014
Suguha Kirigaya meets with Asuna Yuuki, Keiko Ayano and Rika Shinozaki in order to learn how to swim in the school swimming pool. Meanwhile, Kazuto Kirigaya goes to the school counseling office and meets Seijirō Kikuoka, a member of the Virtual Division of the Ministry of Internal Affairs and Communications, who investigates matters concerning the SAO incident in order to fully grasp the motives behind Akihiko Kayaba. Kazuto recounts and reflects on his experience while in Aincrad in SAO, while Suguha is told about Kazuto as Kirito and the times he spent with Keiko as Silica, and Rika as Lisbeth, as well as how he developed feelings for Asuna while in SAO. Kazuto then explains his experience while in Alfheim in ALO, recalling his mission with the help of Suguha as Leafa to rescue Asuna from Nobuyuki Sugō as Oberon the Fairy King at the World Tree. Suguha eventually learns how to swim and Kazuto finally finishes the meeting. While in ALO, Kirito, Asuna, Leafa, Yui, Klein and Agil go to Turtle Island in preparation for a quest with a giant whale as their reward. They dive into the ocean and arrive at an undersea temple where they meet a non-player character named Nerakk, who asks the group to find a pearl inside the undersea temple. After exploring the undersea temple and finding the pearl, it is revealed that the pearl is the Child's Egg, an egg containing a strange creature inside, and that Nerakk is actually Krakken the Abyss Lord, the boss of the quest. The battle is interrupted by another non-player character named Leviathan the Sea Lord, who forces Krakken the Abyss Lord to retreat and collects the Child's Egg, thereby clearing the quest. The group returns to the surface on the back of the giant whale. After the credits, Kazuto's phone rings back at his house, with the ID reading Seijirō Kikuoka.

== Home media release ==
=== Japanese ===
Aniplex, in partnership with Sony Music Entertainment Japan, distributed the episodes in nine volumes in DVD and Blu-ray format across Japan. Sword Art Online: Extra Edition was released on April 23, 2014, in DVD and Blu-ray limited editions, including a bonus Sword Art Offline: Extra Edition episode.

Aniplex (Japan, Region 2)
Volume	Episodes	DVD and Blu-ray release date
Volume 1	1–2	October 24, 2012
Volume 2	3–5	November 21, 2012
Volume 3	6–8	December 26, 2012
Volume 4	9–11	January 23, 2013
Volume 5	12–14	February 27, 2013
Volume 6	15–16	March 27, 2013
Volume 7	17–19	April 24, 2013
Volume 8	20–22	May 22, 2013
Volume 9	23–25	June 26, 2013

=== English ===
In North America, Aniplex of America released the series in four DVD and Blu-ray volumes beginning on August 13, 2013. In Australasia, Madman Entertainment released volume one in DVD and Blu-ray on December 18, 2013, and concluded with volume four on March 19, 2014. In Europe, Manga Entertainment began to release the anime on December 16, 2013. Sword Art Online: Extra Edition was licensed by Aniplex of America and released by Blu-ray and DVD in North America on December 23, 2014.

Aniplex of America (North America, Region 1)
Volume	Episodes	DVD and Blu-ray release date
Part 1	1–7	August 13, 2013
Part 2	8–14	September 17, 2013
Part 3	15–19	October 15, 2013
Part 4	20–25	November 19, 2013

Manga Entertainment (Europe, Region 2)
Volume	Episodes	DVD and Blu-ray release date
Part 1	1–7	December 16, 2013
Part 2	8–14	January 27, 2014
Part 3	15–19	February 24, 2014
Part 4	20–25	March 31, 2014

Madman Entertainment (Australasia, Region 4)
Volume	Episodes	DVD and Blu-ray release date
Part 1	1–7	December 18, 2013
Part 2	8–14	January 15, 2014
Part 3	15–19	February 19, 2014
Part 4	20–25	March 19, 2014

=== Sword Art Offline ===
Sword Art Offline is a series of bonus episodes released in their own DVD and Blu-ray volumes in Japan. The show has 10 episodes, including the extra edition. Aniplex of America announced that they will include those episodes in the English version of the volumes with English subtitles.

Sword Art Offline episode list
Title	Packaged in Japan with
"Sword Art Offline 1"	Volume 1
Features some highlights of Episodes 1 and 2, with Klein as a special guest, life counsel section held by Kirito, and trivia sections led by Yui.
"Sword Art Offline 2"	Volume 2
Features some highlights of Episodes 3, 4, and 5, with Klein replacing Kirito as life counsel host, and Silica as the special guest.
"Sword Art Offline 3"	Volume 3
Features some highlights of Episodes 6, 7, and 8, with Lisbeth as the special guest.
"Sword Art Offline 4"	Volume 4
Features some highlights of Episodes 9, 10, and 11, with Yui as the special guest. Heathcliff substitutes for Yui as trivia guide.
"Sword Art Offline 5"	Volume 5
Features some highlights of Episodes 12, 13, and 14, with Heathcliff as the special guest.
"Sword Art Offline 6"	Volume 6
The show received a major overhaul due to the Fairy Dance arc, with Leafa replaced Asuna as main anchor, and a new section titled "Slot Talk" replacing Klein's Life Counsel. There was no special guest and it highlighted Episodes 15 and 16.
"Sword Art Offline 7"	Volume 7
Features some highlights of Episodes 17, 18, and 19, with Yui once again the special guest. Oberon substitutes for Yui as trivia guide.
"Sword Art Offline 8"	Volume 8
Features some highlights of Episodes 20, 21, and 22.
"Sword Art Offline 9"	Volume 9
Features some highlights of Episodes 23, 24, and 25.
"Sword Art Offline: Extra Edition"	Sword Art Online: Extra Edition DVD/Blu-ray
Features some highlights of the special episode, with Leafa and Asuna as hosts, Kirito as the commentator, and Yui as the special guest.

== See also ==
- Sword Art Online Abridged, an American web series adapting/abridging the season
