= Sword Art Online II =

- Season 2
- Promotional poster for Sword Art Online II
- No. of episodes: 24

Release
- Original network: Tokyo MX
- Original release: July 5 – December 20, 2014

Season chronology
- ← Previous; Sword Art Online Next → Alicization

The second season of the Sword Art Online anime television series, titled Sword Art Online II, based on the light novel series written by Reki Kawahara and illustrated by Abec, was produced by A-1 Pictures and directed by Tomohiko Itō. It is divided into the story arc "Phantom Bullet" which adapts volumes 5–6 and the side stories "Calibur" and "Mother's Rosario" which are respectively adapted from volume 7 and 8 of the light novel. The episodes are each 23 minutes in length and adapts Kawahara's light novels from the fifth through the seventh volumes as well as parts of the eighth volume. The story of the second season follows Kazuto "Kirito" Kirigaya as he plays the new virtual reality game called "Gun Gale Online" (GGO), where he allies himself with a girl named Shino "Sinon" Asada and enters a tournament to investigate a player known only as "Death Gun", who has the ability to kill a person in the real world by killing their virtual avatar. Kirito and his friends return to "Alfheim Online" (ALO), Which was revived when Kirito was given the world seed, to retrieve the Holy Sword Excalibur from Thrym, the King of the Frost Giants, in order to restore the city of Jötunheimr back to its former glory. Asuna befriends a girl named Yuuki Konno, leader of the Sleeping Knights, who asks Asuna to join them in one last quest together. However, Asuna later discovers that Yuuki is suffering from a terminal illness and does not have very long to live.

This 24-episode season initially ran in Japan from July 5 to December 20, 2014, on Tokyo MX with later airings on Chiba TV, tvk, Teleball, GYT, GTV, MBS, TVA, TVh, TVQ and BS11. The series was made available as a worldwide simulcast by Aniplex. It was also picked up by Crunchyroll for online simulcast streaming in North America and other select parts of the world. Daisuki allowed users to stream the series in select European countries.

Five pieces of theme music are used for this series. The first opening theme is "Ignite" performed by Eir Aoi. The first ending theme is "Startear" performed by Luna Haruna. Since the "Calibur" arc, the second opening theme is "Courage", which is performed by Asuna Yuuki's voice actress, Haruka Tomatsu, while the second ending theme is "No More Time Machine", which is performed by Lisa, and the third ending theme is "Shirushi", also performed by Lisa.

== Episodes ==
=== Sword Art Online II ===
Story	Episode (Note: On some streaming platform like Dasiki, Episode 14.5 were labelled as 15 with all episodes after labelled with episode number one higher than others (e.g. episode 15 labelled as #16) due to system restriction.)	Title	Directed by	Written by	Original release date (Note: Sword Art Online II premiered in Tokyo MX's Saturday 23:30 (11:30 p.m. JST) time slot.)	English air date (Note: Adult Swim lists the series as premiering at 1:00 a.m. ET/PT on Saturday, which is effectively Sunday.)	Ref.
Story arc 3: Phantom Bullet
26	1	"The World of Guns"; Transliteration: "Jū no Sekai" (Japanese: 銃の世界)	Tomohiko Itō	Tomohiko Itō	July 5, 2014 (Note: The first episode was screened at special events held in the United States, France, Germany, Hong Kong, Taiwan, Korea and Japan before the television premiere between June 29 and July 4, 2014.)	March 29, 2015	
A new virtual reality game known as "Gun Gale Online" (GGO) is promoted via streamed broadcast, featuring top-ranked player named XeXeeD. In a bar, a cloaked man nicknamed "Death Gun" fires a bullet from his pistol through the video screen, causing XeXeeD to suddenly convulse and disconnect. A month later, Kazuto Kirigaya and Asuna Yuuki are at a park on a date, discussing the differences between the real and virtual worlds. Four hours earlier, Kazuto met with Seijirō Kikuoka, a member of the Virtual Division of the Ministry of Internal Affairs and Communications, who reveals that Tamotsu Shigemura, real-life persona of XeXeeD, died of acute heart failure a few days after his avatar was shot by Death Guns army. Kikuoka, believing that Death Gun is specifically targeting professional Gun Gale Online players, begs Kazuto to once again take up the role of "Kirito" and investigate the situation. In the present, Kazuto and Asuna talk about how the vertical structure of Aincrad in "Sword Art Online" (SAO) represents the axis of time and the plane of space.
27	2	"Cold-Hearted Sniper"; Transliteration: "Kōri no Sogeki Shu" (Japanese: 氷の狙撃手)	Shigeki Kawai	Yukie Sugawara	July 12, 2014	April 5, 2015	
GGO player Sinon snipes a boss in an underground dungeon in SBC Glocken, managing to defeat it with her FR F2 sniper rifle and receiving a PGM Hécate II as her reward. She later assists squadron leader Dyne and squadron member Ginrou in an ambush against another squadron, whose bodyguard named Behemoth is equipped with a minigun. Ginrou dies after being shot multiple times by Behemoth, and Dyne commits suicide by using a plasma grenade to take out Behemoth's squadron. When Sinon and Behemoth are the only ones remaining on the battlefield, Sinon shoots down Behemoth with her sniper rifle while falling from the sky, earning her victory in the gunfight despite suffering severe damage to her left leg. In "Alfheim Online" (ALO), Leafa, Silica and Lisbeth defeat a plant monster, while Kirito prepares to say something to Asuna.
28	3	"Memories of Blood"; Transliteration: "Senketsu no Kioku" (Japanese: 鮮血の記憶)	Hironori Aoyagi	Munemasa Nakamoto	July 19, 2014	April 12, 2015	
Shino Asada, real-life persona of Sinon, is ridiculed by schoolmate Endou, who then is warned away by Shino's friend Kyōji Shinkawa. After hanging out with Kyōji at a restaurant, Shino returns to her house, where she tries to hold a gun replica, inducing a past memory. When she was eleven years old, she shot a robber to death with his own gun at a post office when her mother was threatened to be killed. This flashback triggers a terrifying panic attack for Shino. Meanwhile, Kirito informs Asuna that he is going to be playing GGO for a couple of days. Kazuto goes to the hospital to log in to GGO using a new gaming console called the "AmuSphere", while his body will be monitored by nurse Natsuki Aki. It is revealed that Shino was introduced to GGO by Kyōji as a form of immersion therapy for her fear of guns. While Shino logs in to GGO as well, Death Gun overhears an online voice chat discussion about him. He grins after looking at a photo of Sinon.
29	4	"GGO"	Hidetoshi Takahashi	Yukie Sugawara	July 26, 2014	April 19, 2015	
In GGO, Kirito becomes baffled that his avatar has feminine qualities. He wanders around the city and spots Sinon, who mistakes him as a girl. He explains that he needs to go to the General Governor's Office to sign up for the Bullet of Bullets (BoB), a player versus player tournament. Sinon directs Kirito to a market to buy weaponry and armor, but first he must earn more credits. He participates in a gambling arcade game, in which a player must run up and tag the gunman while dodging the bullets fired, in order to receive the jackpot, and he succeeds in doing so, thanks to his skills in agility. Kirito ultimately decides to purchase a photon sword, and Sinon convinces him to buy an FN Five-seven semi-automatic pistol as a "beginner firearm". Realizing that they only have ten minutes to get to the General Governor's Office before it closes, they spot a buggy rental station nearby. Kirito commandeers a buggy and rides with Sinon onto the highway. Impressed and exhilarated with his driving abilities, Sinon tells Kirito to go faster.
30	5	"Guns and Swords"; Transliteration: "Jū to Ken" (Japanese: 銃と剣)	Daisuke Takashima	Munemasa Nakamoto	August 2, 2014	April 26, 2015	
Kirito and Sinon arrive in time at the terminals of the General Governor's Office to register for the BoB. Kirito leaves his contact information blank, and ends up in the same block as Sinon in the qualifiers. While waiting for them to begin, Kirito reveals his gender after an embarrassing incident with Sinon in the changing room, and this creates a rift between them. Sinon explains the rules of the tournament and expects to see Kirito in the final rounds. The two briefly encounter Spiegel, game avatar of Kyōji, who wishes Sinon good luck in the tournament. Kirito is transferred to his first battle against opponent Uemaru, in which Kirito uses his speed and photon sword to deflect bullets, something no other player had ever thought to attempt before. After winning the match, Kirito returns to the waiting area, where he encounters Death Gun, who asks Kirito if he is the "real deal". Kirito recognizes Death Gun as a former member of the SAO guild of murderous red players, Laughing Coffin.
31	6	"Showdown in the Wilderness"; Transliteration: "Kōya no Kettō" (Japanese: 曠野の決闘)	Shunsuke Machitani	Yukito Kizawa	August 9, 2014	May 3, 2015	
Death Gun vows to kill Kirito someday, whether or not he is the "real deal". Kirito recalls a time when he and his party fought against Laughing Coffin in SAO, feeling anguished that he personally killed three members of Laughing Coffin during the fight. Sinon later finds Kirito stricken with trauma, but he is transferred to his next battle before confiding in her. Kirito wins against his opponent Ginko, while Sinon wins against her opponent Stinger, so Kirito and Sinon are up against each other in the final round in the qualifiers for their block. Both finalists in each block of qualifiers both qualify for the finals so the result of the final round in the qualifiers doesn't really matter. As Kirito calmly approaches Sinon from a distance, Sinon repeatedly misses her shot. She personally confronts him about his promise to not hold back against her during their battle. Kirito challenges Sinon to a duel, photon sword versus sniper rifle. He slices her bullet in half from only yards away and charges at her, holding his photon sword to her neck. He predicted that she was aiming for his legs by watching her eyes through the lens of her gun scope, shocking her greatly. He lets her go and convinces her to surrender the match, but she states that their battle in the finals will be different.
32	7	"Crimson Memories"; Transliteration: "Kurenai no Kioku" (Japanese: 紅の記憶)	Shuu Watanabe	Yukito Kizawa	August 16, 2014	May 10, 2015	
At home, Kazuto's sister Suguha Kirigaya shows Kazuto a news article about the BoB, in which Suguha has already found out from Asuna that Kazuto converted from ALO to GGO. Kirito assures Suguha to not worry about him, since he will return to ALO as soon as he finishes his work in GGO. Meanwhile, Kyōji notices that Shino is acting differently and tries to calm her down when she vents her anger about Kirito. When Kyōji tries to hug her, she pushes him back and rejects him. Back at the hospital, Kazuto tells Aki about how he killed the three members of Laughing Coffin, but she reminds him that he killed them to protect others, before he logs in to GGO again. In ALO, Asuna, Leafa, Klein, Silica, Lisbeth and Yui work together to defeat a lizard monster before getting ready to watch a live broadcast of the BoB. In GGO, Sinon meets Kirito at the General Governor's Office, and they tell each other that they will not lose.
33	8	"Bullet of Bullets"; Transliteration: "Baretto obu Barettsu" (Japanese: バレット・オブ・バレッツ)	Hirokazu Yamada	Yukie Sugawara	August 23, 2014	May 17, 2015	
Kirito believes that Death Gun will be under the guise of an alias and use the tournament to stage another murder. Sinon later explains to Kirito the rules and regulations of the battle royale round of the BoB, and she says that there are three players other than him out of thirty players who have not participated in the previous tournaments. Kirito indirectly confides in Sinon about his reason for entering the tournament. During the battle royale, Sinon decides to target Dyne as well as Pale Rider, one of the first-time tournament players. When Sinon prepares to snipe Dyne near a bridge, Kirito stops her and tells her to watch the duel between Dyne and Pale Rider. Kirito and Sinon witness as Pale Rider uses his acrobatic skills to defeat Dyne, but Pale Rider is suddenly shot with a silenced stun bullet. Death Gun reveals himself at the bridge and prepares to finish off Pale Rider. However, Kirito urges Sinon to shoot Death Gun before Death Gun shoots Pale Rider.
34	9	"Death Gun"; Transliteration: "Desu Gan" (Japanese: デス·ガン)	Yoshihiko Iwata	Yukie Sugawara	August 30, 2014	May 31, 2015	
Sinon attempts to shoot Death Gun, but he dodges the bullet and kills Pale Rider with his pistol. Asuna, Leafa, Klein, Silica, Lisbeth and Yui also realize that Death Gun is a part of Laughing Coffin. Sinon and Kirito deduces that Death Gun traveled underwater in the river, and is now heading north. Asuna logs out of ALO to find Kikuoka for answers. Kirito and Sinon reach the end of the river and try to find the two other first-time tournament players, Musketeer X and Sterben. They locate Musketeer X at a stadium and decide to split up, but before Sinon takes her position, she is suddenly shot with a stun bullet. Death Gun, revealed to be Sterben, appears and proclaims that he is going to kill her. She is shocked when Death Gun pulls out his Type 54 pistol, coincidentally the same type of gun that she used to kill the robber at the post office when she was eleven years old.
35	10	"Death Chaser"; Transliteration: "Shi no Tsuigeki-sha" (Japanese: 死の追撃者)	Makoto Hoshino	Munemasa Nakamoto	September 6, 2014	June 7, 2015	
Kirito intercepts Death Gun, injuring him with a sniper rifle and chasing him off with a smoke grenade. Kirito carries Sinon to a buggy rental station and commandeers a buggy, while telling her to shoot the only functional mechanical horse to make it unusable. However, Sinon is unable to exert force on the trigger due to psychological trauma, which allows Death Gun to catch up and take control of the mechanical horse. During the subsequent chase, Death Gun fires at Kirito and Sinon with his pistol, terrifying the latter. When Sinon tries to shoot at Death Gun, Kirito is forced to help her pull the trigger. Though the shot misses Death Gun, it hits the fuel tank of a truck, which explodes and forces Death Gun to abandon his horse. Kirito and Sinon escape into the desert, where they find a cave to take cover for a while. Kirito reveals that he defeated Musketeer X and took her weapons prior to saving Sinon from Death Gun. Kirito tells Sinon to not throw her life away by facing Death Gun on her own, much to her rebellion. They each confess their traumatic memories of who they killed in the past.
36	11	"What It Means to Be Strong"; Transliteration: "Tsuyosa no Imi" (Japanese: 強さの意味)	Daisuke Takashima	Munemasa Nakamoto	September 13, 2014	June 14, 2015	
Kirito tells Sinon that he is trying to accept the weight of his traumatic memories as a means of closure. Kirito and Sinon try to figure out how Death Gun is able to shoot a player in the virtual world and kill the same player in the real world. They have the idea that Death Gun may have used his camouflage mantle to peek at the players' contact information in the terminals, which is a violation of etiquette and privacy. However, Kirito realizes that Death Gun is two people, in which one of them shoots the player in the virtual world, while the other kills the player in the real world by injecting them with succinylcholine, targeting people who live alone in areas of low security. The pair realise, much to Shino's horror, that Death Gun's partner is currently in her room in real life waiting for her avatar Sinon to be shot by Sterbern in game. In ALO, Kikuoka logs in as Chrysheight, who confirms the current situation to Asuna, Leafa, Klein, Silica, Lisbeth and Yui. Although they are upset that Kirito took on this assignment by himself, they come to realize that he did not want them to get involved with any potential danger. In GGO, Kirito and Sinon decide on a course of action, with Kirito as the decoy and Sinon as the surprise attack.
37	12	"Bullet of a Phantom"; Transliteration: "Maboroshi no Jūdan" (Japanese: 幻の銃弾)	Hiroshi Kimura	Yukito Kizawa	September 20, 2014	June 21, 2015	
With twenty-four players dead and five players alive, Kirito speculates that there may be more accomplices of Death Gun who are committing murder in the real world. Kirito and Sinon believe that Yamikaze may be another target for Death Gun. With that in mind, Kirito goes out in the desert as bait and waits for either Yamikaze or Death Gun to attack him. Kirito senses Yamikaze closing in on him, but Death Gun fires a bullet, which Kirito dodges by a hair. Yamikaze tries to hide, but Sinon kills Yamikaze to protect Kirito. Death Gun then realizes that Sinon is aiming at him, and as they shoot a bullet at each other, Sinon destroys Death Gun's sniper rifle at the cost of her telescopic sight shattering. However, as Kirito is about to strike Death Gun, the latter pulls an estoc from the remains of his rifle and counters the attack. After the two exchange insults and threats, Death Gun begins assaulting Kirito with overwhelming speed.
38	13	"Phantom Bullet"; Transliteration: "Fantomu Baretto" (Japanese: ファントム・バレット)	Shigeki Kawai	Yukito Kizawa	September 27, 2014	June 28, 2015	
Recalling a debriefing before the raid against Laughing Coffin in SAO, Kirito finally recognizes Death Gun as Red-Eyed XaXa, formerly second-in-command of Laughing Coffin. Sinon creates a bullet path as a distraction, and Kirito pulls out his pistol to fire at XaXa, making the latter vulnerable from using his camouflage mantle. This allows Kirito to use all of his willpower to slice XaXa in half, but XaXa reassures him that their battle is not over yet before he dies. Kirito and Sinon reveal their real names to each other, and they agree to end the BoB by committing an in-game double suicide using a grenade, crowning both of them the winners. After logging out, Shino is visited by Kyōji, who makes romantic advances toward her. He pulls out a syringe and reveals himself as the second accomplice. When Kyōji then starts to molest Shino, Kazuto bursts through the door and attacks Kyōji.
39	14	"One Little Step"; Transliteration: "Chisana Ippo" (Japanese: 小さな一歩)	Tomohiko Itō	Yukie Sugawara	October 4, 2014	July 12, 2015	
Kyōji manages to inject Kazuto in the chest with the syringe, but Shino bashes Kyōji unconscious with a stereo record player, before finding out that Kazuto had a hospital electrode still stuck on his chest which protected him from the syringe. Shino is later ridiculed again by Endou, who points a replica air gun at Shino but fails to fire a bullet. Shino takes the gun from Endou, disables the safety and shoots an empty soda can, before returning the gun back to Endou, proving that she overcame her fear. Kazuto picks Shino up and takes her to see Kikuoka to report on the Death Gun incident, in which Kyōji and his brother Shōichi Shinkawa worked together to kill players in both the real and virtual worlds. Kirito and Shino later meet with Asuna and Rika Shinozaki at the café owned by Andrew Gill "Agil" Mills. After Kirito reveals that he told Asuna and Rika about her past, Shino is introduced to Sachie Oosawa, a former employee at the post office during the robbery, who was pregnant at the time with her now four-year-old daughter Mizue. Shino finally finds closure in the lives she saved, shedding tears of happiness.
Side Story 1: Calibur
40	15	"The Queen of the Lake"; Transliteration: "Mizuumi no Joō" (Japanese: 湖の女王)	Shuu Watanabe	Atsushi Takayama, Munemasa Nakamoto	October 18, 2014	July 19, 2015	
One month after the GGO incident, Suguha "Leafa" Kirigaya shows her brother Kazuto "Kirito" Kirigaya a news article about a legendary item, the Holy Sword Excaliber, which has been discovered in a floating dungeon located in Jötunheimr in ALO. The two rally Asuna Yuuki, Shino "Sinon" Asada, Ryōtarō "Klein" Tsuboi, Keiko "Silica" Ayano and Rika "Lisbeth" Shinozaki together to prepare for the mission to retrieve Excaliber. They enter Jötunheimr through a secret passageway and use Tonky, a friendly beast evil god monster resembling a flying jellyfish-elephant, to fly towards the dungeon. They witness players assisting a humanoid evil god monster to massacre a beast evil god monster. Suddenly, Urðr, the Queen of the Lake, appears behind them and explains that the massacre was ordered by Thrym, the King of the Frost Giants, who threw Excaliber into Urðr's Spring and caused the formerly green world of Jötunheimr to turn into an icy wasteland. She requests them to retrieve Excaliber from the bottom of the dungeon, the inverted ice pyramid Thrymheim, before all of the beast evil god monsters are slaughtered.
41	16	"The King of the Giants"; Transliteration: "Kyojin no Ō" (Japanese: 巨人の王)	Hidetoshi Takahashi	Munemasa Nakamoto, Ryôsuke Suzuki	October 25, 2014	July 26, 2015	
At the entrance to Thrymheim, the group is determined to succeed in the quest in order to prevent Thrym from invading Alfheim and causing the cataclysmic event Ragnarok to happen. At the end of the second floor, they use elemental magic to power their weapons in order to take down two minotaurs with a great amount of teamwork. After they defeat a giant insect on the third floor, they encounter a woman locked in an ice cage, and despite fearing it may be a trap, Klein destroys the ice cage to free her. Kirito reluctantly agrees for the woman, recognized as Freyja, to join the group. After Asuna recharges and Freyja boosts the group's health, they enter the boss room filled with gold, where they are met by Thrym.
42	17	"Excalibur"; Transliteration: "Ekusukyaribā" (Japanese: エクスキャリバー)	Hirokazu Yamada	Yukie Sugawara	November 1, 2014	August 2, 2015	
The group engages in battle against Thrym, overwhelming him with their attacks, but he soon retaliates. Among the pile of gold, Kirito finds a golden hammer and tosses it to Freyja, who suddenly transforms into Thor, the Norse god of thunder. With the group's help, Thor defeats Thrym once and for all, rewarding Klein with the golden hammer Mjölnir. A staircase opens up and leads to the last floor, where Kirito pulls the sword out of the ice with much effort, causing the floor to break off and drop down a chasm. As Tonky arrives to save them, Kirito is forced to throw Excaliber into the chasm due to its heavy item weight, but Sinon uses her bow and arrow to retrieve it. As a result, Jötunheimr is rejuvenated and filled with fresh water and greenery. Urðr and her sisters Verðandi and Skuld appear and thank them for saving Jötunheimr, in which Urðr rewards Kirito with Excaliber. In the real world, Kazuto, Suguha and Shino test out an audiovisual bidirectional communication probe for a mechatronics project to allow Yui to interact with the real world. The group later has lunch to celebrate the conclusion of the quest.
Side Story 2: Mother's Rosario
43	18	"Forest House"; Transliteration: "Mori no Ie" (Japanese: 森の家)	Kosaya	Munemasa Nakamoto	November 8, 2014	August 9, 2015	
While Kazuto "Kirito" Kirigaya and Asuna Yuuki reminisces about their time in Aincrad, Andrew Gill "Agil" Mills informs them about the third update in ALO, which has unlocked the 21st through the 30th Floors on New Aincrad. With the help of their friends, Kirito and Asuna manage to defeat the boss of the 21st Floor, allowing them to enter the 22nd Floor, where they are able to purchase their old honeymoon log cabin again. At night, Asuna is told about an unbeatable player named Zekken (or Absolute Sword), who challenged and defeated many players at an island on the 24th Floor. Rika "Lisbeth" Shinozaki, Keiko "Silica" Ayano and Suguha "Leafa" Kirigaya share information about what they have learned about Zekken, noting that even Kirito was defeated by Zekken in the past. Lisbeth tells Asuna that Zekken cannot be a survivor of SAO, because Kirito would have lost his dual wielding technique to Zekken if that was the case.
44	19	"Zekken" (Japanese: 絶剣)	Shigeki Kawai	Munemasa Nakamoto	November 15, 2014	August 16, 2015	
Asuna logs out of ALO and has dinner with her mother Kyouko Yuuki, who shows high concern for Asuna's education, wanting her to go to college to have a successful career and future husband. Asuna storms out when Kyouko states that Kazuto is an unsuitable husband. In her room, Asuna laments that despite being powerful in the virtual world, she feels powerless in the real world. The next day, Asuna goes to the 24th Floor to meet with Kirito, who shares his first impressions of Zekken. At the island, Asuna discovers that Zekken is actually a girl named Yuuki Konno. During the duel, both Asuna and Yuuki are able to block attacks and land some hits on each other using their original sword skills, but Yuuki stops her assault before having the opportunity to defeat Asuna. Satisfied with the duel, Yuuki then asks Asuna to help her with something.
45	20	"Sleeping Knights"; Transliteration: "Surīpingu Naitsu" (Japanese: スリーピング・ナイツ)	Un Kokusai	Munemasa Nakamoto, Ryôsuke Suzuki	November 22, 2014	August 23, 2015	
On the 27th Floor, Asuna is introduced to Yuuki's guild, the Sleeping Knights (Yuuki, Siune, Jun, Tecchi, Talken and Nori). They need Asuna's help in defeating the boss of the 27th Floor with their party alone, to have all of their names permanently etched on the Monument of Swordsmen on the 1st Floor, since they will not be able to adventure together after winter. However, Kyouko forcefully logs Asuna out of ALO to her dismay. The next day, Asuna and the Sleeping Knights clear the dungeon of the 27th Floor and encounter a few players in hiding, before attempting to fight the boss, the Four-Armed Giant. After being defeated, Asuna informs the Sleeping Knights that the few players they encountered are scouts who specialize in boss raids. When they go back to the boss room, much of the raid party is gathered at the door, not allowing them to pass. Asuna is inspired when Yuuki declares that they should fight to get their point across. The raid party reinforcements arrive, but Kirito drops in to block the reinforcements.
46	21	"Swordsman's Memorial"; Transliteration: "Kenshi no Hi" (Japanese: 剣士の碑)	Yasuyuki Fuse	Atsushi Takayama, Munemasa Nakamoto	November 29, 2014	August 30, 2015	
While Kirito takes on the raid party reinforcements, Klein arrives and helps Kirito hold them off. Asuna and the Sleeping Knights then fight their way through the raid party blocking the boss room. Inside the boss room, Asuna and the Sleeping Knights battle the Four-Armed Giant again, in which Asuna figures out that the jewel on the Four-Armed Giant's chest is its weakness. Yuuki uses Tecchi's back as a stepping stone to jump and uses her sword skill to destroy the jewel, thereby destroying the Four-Armed Giant. With the mission concluded, the Sleeping Knights agree to have a celebration at Asuna's log house. During the celebration, Asuna asks Yuuki if she could join the Sleeping Knights, but Yuuki declines since the group will be disbanded in the spring. They go to the Monument of Swordsmen on the 1st Floor to take a picture with their names carved on the large stone tablet behind them. After accidentally addressing Asuna as her older sister, Yuuki unexpectedly starts crying and abruptly logs out.
47	22	"Journey's End"; Transliteration: "Tabiji no Hate" (Japanese: 旅路の果て)	Yasuto Nishikata	Yukie Sugawara	December 6, 2014	September 13, 2015	
Three days later, Siune tells Asuna to forget about ever meeting the Sleeping Knights for her own sake. After school, Asuna meets up with Kazuto, who gives her the address to a hospital where a virtual reality gaming console called the "Medicuboid" is undergoing clinical trials. At the hospital, Asuna meets Yuuki's primary care physician Doctor Kurahashi, who explains that the Medicuboid is designed for patients in terminal care, and that Yuuki suffers from AIDS due to an infection via blood transfusion during her mother's labor complications. She has been put in a sterile room to avoid the risk of further infection and has been permanently hooked up to the Medicuboid for three years. Asuna breaks down into tears after learning that Yuuki does not have very long to live, but Yuuki communicates with Asuna via Medicuboid, verifying that she can hear and see Asuna. Using the AmuSphere in the next room to log into the game, Asuna rushes to the place she first met Yuuki in ALO. Yuuki reveals that the Sleeping Knights are all patients in terminal care, being the reason why they needed Asuna to help them finish one last quest before Yuuki's impending death.
48	23	"Beginning of a Dream"; Transliteration: "Yume no Hajimari" (Japanese: 夢の始まり)	Shigeki Kawai	Yukie Sugawara	December 13, 2014	September 20, 2015	
Asuna takes the audiovisual bidirectional communication probe to give Yuuki the experience of attending school for a day. Yuuki requests Asuna to take her to her old house to see it one last time, since the house will be demolished soon. Yuuki says that her mother does not understand what her feelings are, which Asuna can relate with her own mother as well. Although Yuuki denies that she is as strong as Asuna, Yuuki says that she is honest with her feelings. Following Yuuki's advice, Asuna goes home and convinces Kyouko to log in to ALO so she could express how she feels. At the log cabin while it is snowing, Kyouko is reminded of when her parents were proud of her and how they wished to protect their home for Kyouko to always return to. Asuna then reveals that life is not about just doing things for oneself, and the happiness of others could make one happy as well. The next morning, Kyouko tells Asuna that she has to prove herself if she says that she is strong enough to live a selfless life.
49	24	"Mother's Rosario"; Transliteration: "Mazāzu Rozario" (Japanese: マザーズ・ロザリオ)	Tomohiko Itō	Tomohiko Itō	December 20, 2014	September 27, 2015	
Months later, Asuna receives an urgent message from Kurahashi that Yuuki's condition had deteriorated. Asuna rushes to the hospital and requests Kurahashi to hook Yuuki up to the Medicuboid one last time. Asuna meets Yuuki at the island, where Yuuki creates a scroll containing her original sword skill and gives it to Asuna. All of Yuuki's and Asuna's friends and allies arrive to see Yuuki in her final moments, fulfilling Yuuki's wish for all of her loved ones to come see her before she dies. After Yuuki's memorial service, Asuna meets Si-eun An, real-life persona of Siune, who has been discharged from the hospital after her successful treatment for acute lymphoblastic leukemia. Asuna and Si-eun learn from Kazuto and Kurahashi about the idea of applying the audiovisual bidirectional communication probe for medical technology purposes, thanks to Yuuki's contributions. Asuna is surprised that the Medicuboid designs came from a benefactor, Rinko Koujiro, the doctor who monitored Akihiko Kayaba during the SAO incident, thus Akihiko was the inventor of the Medicuboid. Kazuto and Asuna join their friends for a picnic photo after discussing how the virtual world has benefited them in the real world.

=== Sword Art Offline II ===
Story	Packaged in Japan with home video release
1	"Sword Art Offline Two 1"; Transliteration: "Sōdo Āto Ofurain Tsū Sono Ichi" (Japanese: そーどあーと・おふらいん つー その1)
2	"Sword Art Offline Two 2"; Transliteration: "Sōdo Āto Ofurain Tsū Sono Ni" (Japanese: そーどあーと・おふらいん つー その2)
3	"Sword Art Offline Two 3"; Transliteration: "Sōdo Āto Ofurain Tsū Sono San" (Japanese: そーどあーと・おふらいん つー その3)
4	"Sword Art Offline Two 4"; Transliteration: "Sōdo Āto Ofurain Tsū Sono Shi" (Japanese: そーどあーと・おふらいん つー その4)
5	"Sword Art Offline Two 5"; Transliteration: "Sōdo Āto Ofurain Tsū Sono Go" (Japanese: そーどあーと・おふらいん つー その5)
6	"Sword Art Offline Two 6"; Transliteration: "Sōdo Āto Ofurain Tsū Sono Roku" (Japanese: そーどあーと・おふらいん つー その6)
7	"Sword Art Offline Two 7"; Transliteration: "Sōdo Āto Ofurain Tsū Sono Nana" (Japanese: そーどあーと・おふらいん つー その7)
8	"Sword Art Offline Two 8"; Transliteration: "Sōdo Āto Ofurain Tsū Sono Hachi" (Japanese: そーどあーと・おふらいん つー その8)
9	"Sword Art Offline Two 9"; Transliteration: "Sōdo Āto Ofurain Tsū Sono Kyuu" (Japanese: そーどあーと・おふらいん つー その9)

=== Recap special ===
No. overall	Episode	Title	Original release date	Ref.
39.5	14.5	"Debriefing"	October 11, 2014	
This recap special summarizes all the events chronologically revolving around Sinon.

== Home media release 1 ==
=== Japanese ===
Aniplex (Japan, Region 2)
Volume	Episodes	Blu-ray and DVD release date
Volume 1	1–3	October 22, 2014
Volume 2	4–6	November 26, 2014
Volume 3	7–9	December 24, 2014
Volume 4	10–12	January 28, 2015
Volume 5	13–14.5	February 25, 2015
Volume 6	15–17	March 25, 2015
Volume 7	18–20	April 22, 2015
Volume 8	21–22	May 27, 2015
Volume 9	23–24	June 24, 2015
