= List of Sword Art Online episodes =

Sword Art Online is an anime television series based on the light novel series of the same title written by Reki Kawahara and illustrated by abec. The anime series adaptation of Sword Art Online was announced at Dengeki Bunko Autumn Festival 2011, along with Reki Kawahara's other light novel series, Accel World. The anime is produced by Aniplex and Genco, animated by A-1 Pictures and directed by Tomohiko Ito with music by Yuki Kajiura. The first season aired on Tokyo MX, tvk, TV Saitama, TV Aichi, RKB, HBC and MBS between July 8 and December 23, 2012, and on AT-X, Chiba TV and BS11 at later dates. Adult Swim's Toonami programming block aired the anime starting on July 28, 2013. The series was also streamed on Crunchyroll and Hulu.

A second season, titled Sword Art Online II, aired July 5 to December 20, 2014. At Katsucon, it was announced that the English dub of the second season would air on Adult Swim's Toonami on March 29, 2015.

A third season, titled Sword Art Online: Alicization, began airing on October 7, 2018, with a one-hour world premiere which aired in Japan, the United States, Australia, France, Germany, Russia and South Korea on September 15, 2018. The first half of Sword Art Online: Alicization aired from October 7, 2018, through March 31, 2019. The second half, titled War of Underworld, aired on October 13, 2019. The final part of the War of Underworld series was originally scheduled to premiere on April 26, 2020, but due to the effects of the COVID-19 pandemic in Japan, it was rescheduled to July 12, 2020.

Alicization covered four cours (47 episodes) and adapted from the novel's ninth volume, Alicization Beginning, to the eighteenth volume, Alicization Lasting. The English dub of the third season premiered on February 10, 2019, on Adult Swim's Toonami programming block. The English dub version for the second cour of the second part of the third season premiered on Adult Swim's Toonami on November 8, 2020.

== Series overview ==
Season	Episodes		Originally released	
Season	Episodes		First released	Last released
1	25		July 8, 2012	December 23, 2012
2	24		July 5, 2014	December 20, 2014
3	47	24	October 7, 2018	March 31, 2019
3	47	12	October 13, 2019	December 29, 2019
3	47	11	July 12, 2020	September 20, 2020

== Episodes ==
=== Season 1 (2012) ===
Story	Episode	Title	Directed by	Written by	Original release date (Note: Tokyo MX lists the series as premiering at 24:00 on Saturday, which is effectively Sunday at 12:00 a.m. JST.)	English air date (Note: Adult Swim lists the series as premiering at 2:00 a.m. ET/PT on Saturday, which is effectively Sunday.)	Ref.
Story arc 1: Aincrad
1	1	"The World of Swords"; Transliteration: "Ken no Sekai" (Japanese: 剣の世界)	Tomohiko Itō	Yukie Sugawara, Yukito Kizawa	July 8, 2012	July 28, 2013	
2	2	"Beater"; Transliteration: "Bītā" (Japanese: ビーター)	Yoshiyuki Fujiwara	Munemasa Nakamoto	July 15, 2012	August 4, 2013	
3	3	"The Red-Nosed Reindeer"; Transliteration: "Akahana no Tonakai" (赤鼻のトナカイ)	Yuuki Itohafrer	Yukie Sugawara	July 22, 2012	August 11, 2013	
4	4	"The Black Swordsman"; Transliteration: "Kuro no Kenshi" (Japanese: 黒の剣士)	Shinya Watada	Yoshikazu Mukai	July 29, 2012	August 18, 2013	
5	5	"Murder in the Safe Zone"; Transliteration: "Kennai Jiken" (Japanese: 圏内事件)	Yasuyuki Fuse	Yukito Kizawa	August 5, 2012	August 25, 2013	
6	6	"Illusionary Avenger"; Transliteration: "Maboroshi no Fukushū-sha" (Japanese: 幻の復讐者)	Kazuma Satō	Yukito Kizawa	August 12, 2012	September 8, 2013	
7	7	"The Temperature of the Heart"; Transliteration: "Kokoro no Ondo" (Japanese: 心の温度)	Makoto Hoshino	Yoshikazu Mukai	August 19, 2012	September 15, 2013	
8	8	"The Sword Dance of Black and White"; Transliteration: "Kuro to Shiro no Kenbu" (Japanese: 黒と白の剣舞)	Tatsumi Fujii	Shuji Iriyama	August 26, 2012	September 22, 2013	
9	9	"The Blue-Eyed Demon"; Transliteration: "Seigan no Akuma" (Japanese: 青眼の悪魔)	Koichi Kikuta	Munemasa Nakamoto, Naoki Shōji	September 2, 2012	September 29, 2013	
10	10	"Crimson Killing Intent"; Transliteration: "Kurenai no Satsui" (Japanese: 紅の殺意)	Hideya Takahashi	Yukito Kizawa	September 9, 2012	October 6, 2013	
11	11	"Girl of the Morning Dew"; Transliteration: "Asatsuyu no Shōjo" (Japanese: 朝露の少女)	Pyeon-Gang Ho	Yukie Sugawara	September 16, 2012	October 13, 2013	
12	12	"Yui's Heart"; Transliteration: "Yui no Kokoro" (Japanese: ユイの心)	Tamaki Nakatsu	Yukie Sugawara	September 23, 2012	October 20, 2013	
13	13	"Edge of Hell's Abyss"; Transliteration: "Naraku no Fuchi" (Japanese: 奈落の淵)	Takahiro Shikama	Yoshikazu Mukai	September 30, 2012	October 27, 2013	
14	14	"The End of the World"; Transliteration: "Sekai no Shūen" (Japanese: 世界の終焉)	Tomohiko Itō	Yukito Kizawa	October 7, 2012	November 3, 2013	
Story arc 2: Fairy Dance
15	15	"Return"; Transliteration: "Kikan" (Japanese: 帰還)	Shigetaka Ikeda	Munemasa Nakamoto	October 14, 2012	November 10, 2013	
16	16	"Land of the Fairies"; Transliteration: "Yōsei-tachi no Kuni" (Japanese: 妖精たちの国)	Yasuyuki Fuse	Yukie Sugawara	October 21, 2012	November 17, 2013	
17	17	"Captive Queen"; Transliteration: "Toraware no Joō" (Japanese: 囚われの女王)	Yoshiyuki Fujiwara	Yoshikazu Mukai	October 28, 2012	November 24, 2013	
18	18	"To the World Tree"; Transliteration: "Sekaiju e" (Japanese: 世界樹へ)	Takayoshi Morimiya	Yukito Kizawa	November 4, 2012	December 1, 2013	
19	19	"The Legrue Corridor"; Transliteration: "Rugurū Kairō" (Japanese: ルグルー回廊)	Pyeon-Gang Ho	Shuji Iriyama	November 11, 2012	January 5, 2014 (Note: TV Guide errorously stated that the English version of "The Lugru Corridor" was originally aired on the night of December 28–29, 2013, but Toonami did not air this episode on that night.)	
20	20	"General of the Blazing Flame"; Transliteration: "Mōen no Shō" (Japanese: 猛炎の将)	Makoto Hoshino, Takahiro Shikama	Naoki Shōji	November 18, 2012	January 12, 2014	
21	21	"The Truth About Alfheim"; Transliteration: "Aruvuheimu no Shinjitsu" (Japanese: アルヴヘイムの真実)	Pyeon-Gang Ho	Munemasa Nakamoto	November 25, 2012	January 19, 2014	
22	22	"The Grand Quest"; Transliteration: "Gurando Kuesuto" (Japanese: グランド・クエスト)	Kazuhisa Ouno	Yukito Kizawa	December 2, 2012	January 26, 2014	
23	23	"Bonds"; Transliteration: "Kizuna" (Japanese: 絆)	Shigetaka Ikeda	Yoshikazu Mukai	December 9, 2012	February 2, 2014	
24	24	"Gilded Hero"; Transliteration: "Mekki no Yūsha" (Japanese: 鍍金の勇者)	Tomohiko Itō	Yukie Sugawara	December 16, 2012	February 9, 2014	
25	25	"The World Seed"; Transliteration: "Sekai no Shushi" (Japanese: 世界の種子)	Tomohiko Itō	Munemasa Nakamoto	December 23, 2012	February 16, 2014	

=== Season 2: II (2014) ===
Story	Episode (Note: On some streaming platform like Dasiki, Episode 14.5 were labelled as 15 with all episodes after labelled with episode number one higher than others (e.g. episode 15 labelled as #16) due to system restriction.)	Title	Directed by	Written by	Original release date (Note: Sword Art Online II premiered in Tokyo MX's Saturday 23:30 (11:30 p.m. JST) time slot.)	English air date (Note: Adult Swim lists the series as premiering at 1:00 a.m. ET/PT on Saturday, which is effectively Sunday.)	Ref.
Story arc 3: Phantom Bullet
26	1	"The World of Guns"; Transliteration: "Jū no Sekai" (Japanese: 銃の世界)	Tomohiko Itō	Tomohiko Itō	July 5, 2014 (Note: The first episode was screened at special events held in the United States, France, Germany, Hong Kong, Taiwan, Korea and Japan before the television premiere between June 29 and July 4, 2014.)	March 29, 2015	
27	2	"Cold-Hearted Sniper"; Transliteration: "Kōri no Sogeki Shu" (Japanese: 氷の狙撃手)	Shigeki Kawai	Yukie Sugawara	July 12, 2014	April 5, 2015	
28	3	"Memories of Blood"; Transliteration: "Senketsu no Kioku" (Japanese: 鮮血の記憶)	Hironori Aoyagi	Munemasa Nakamoto	July 19, 2014	April 12, 2015	
29	4	"GGO"	Hidetoshi Takahashi	Yukie Sugawara	July 26, 2014	April 19, 2015	
30	5	"Guns and Swords"; Transliteration: "Jū to Ken" (Japanese: 銃と剣)	Daisuke Takashima	Munemasa Nakamoto	August 2, 2014	April 26, 2015	
31	6	"Showdown in the Wilderness"; Transliteration: "Kōya no Kettō" (Japanese: 曠野の決闘)	Shunsuke Machitani	Yukito Kizawa	August 9, 2014	May 3, 2015	
32	7	"Crimson Memories"; Transliteration: "Kurenai no Kioku" (Japanese: 紅の記憶)	Shuu Watanabe	Yukito Kizawa	August 16, 2014	May 10, 2015	
33	8	"Bullet of Bullets"; Transliteration: "Baretto obu Barettsu" (Japanese: バレット・オブ・バレッツ)	Hirokazu Yamada	Yukie Sugawara	August 23, 2014	May 17, 2015	
34	9	"Death Gun"; Transliteration: "Desu Gan" (Japanese: デス·ガン)	Yoshihiko Iwata	Yukie Sugawara	August 30, 2014	May 31, 2015	
35	10	"Death Chaser"; Transliteration: "Shi no Tsuigeki-sha" (Japanese: 死の追撃者)	Makoto Hoshino	Munemasa Nakamoto	September 6, 2014	June 7, 2015	
36	11	"What It Means to Be Strong"; Transliteration: "Tsuyosa no Imi" (Japanese: 強さの意味)	Daisuke Takashima	Munemasa Nakamoto	September 13, 2014	June 14, 2015	
37	12	"Bullet of a Phantom"; Transliteration: "Maboroshi no Jūdan" (Japanese: 幻の銃弾)	Hiroshi Kimura	Yukito Kizawa	September 20, 2014	June 21, 2015	
38	13	"Phantom Bullet"; Transliteration: "Fantomu Baretto" (Japanese: ファントム・バレット)	Shigeki Kawai	Yukito Kizawa	September 27, 2014	June 28, 2015	
39	14	"One Little Step"; Transliteration: "Chisana Ippo" (Japanese: 小さな一歩)	Tomohiko Itō	Yukie Sugawara	October 4, 2014	July 12, 2015	
Side Story 1: Calibur
40	15	"The Queen of the Lake"; Transliteration: "Mizuumi no Joō" (Japanese: 湖の女王)	Shuu Watanabe	Atsushi Takayama, Munemasa Nakamoto	October 18, 2014	July 19, 2015	
41	16	"The King of the Giants"; Transliteration: "Kyojin no Ō" (Japanese: 巨人の王)	Hidetoshi Takahashi	Munemasa Nakamoto, Ryôsuke Suzuki	October 25, 2014	July 26, 2015	
42	17	"Excalibur"; Transliteration: "Ekusukyaribā" (Japanese: エクスキャリバー)	Hirokazu Yamada	Yukie Sugawara	November 1, 2014	August 2, 2015	
Side Story 2: Mother's Rosario
43	18	"Forest House"; Transliteration: "Mori no Ie" (Japanese: 森の家)	Kosaya	Munemasa Nakamoto	November 8, 2014	August 9, 2015	
44	19	"Zekken" (Japanese: 絶剣)	Shigeki Kawai	Munemasa Nakamoto	November 15, 2014	August 16, 2015	
45	20	"Sleeping Knights"; Transliteration: "Surīpingu Naitsu" (Japanese: スリーピング・ナイツ)	Un Kokusai	Munemasa Nakamoto, Ryôsuke Suzuki	November 22, 2014	August 23, 2015	
46	21	"Swordsman's Memorial"; Transliteration: "Kenshi no Hi" (Japanese: 剣士の碑)	Yasuyuki Fuse	Atsushi Takayama, Munemasa Nakamoto	November 29, 2014	August 30, 2015	
47	22	"Journey's End"; Transliteration: "Tabiji no Hate" (Japanese: 旅路の果て)	Yasuto Nishikata	Yukie Sugawara	December 6, 2014	September 13, 2015	
48	23	"Beginning of a Dream"; Transliteration: "Yume no Hajimari" (Japanese: 夢の始まり)	Shigeki Kawai	Yukie Sugawara	December 13, 2014	September 20, 2015	
49	24	"Mother's Rosario"; Transliteration: "Mazāzu Rozario" (Japanese: マザーズ・ロザリオ)	Tomohiko Itō	Tomohiko Itō	December 20, 2014	September 27, 2015	

=== Season 3: Alicization (2018–20) ===
Story	Episode	Title (Note: All English titles are taken from Crunchyroll.)	Directed by	Written by	Original release date	English air date	Ref.
Story arc 4: Alicization
Part 1: Alicization Beginning
50	1	"Underworld"; Transliteration: "Andāwārudo" (Japanese: アンダーワールド)	Manabu Ono, Tsuyoshi Tobita	Yukito Kizawa	October 7, 2018 (Note: Sword Art Online: Alicization premiered with a special one-hour episode, with pre-screenings in several countries on September 15, 2018.)	February 10, 2019	
51	2	"The Demon Tree"; Transliteration: "Akuma no Ki" (Japanese: 悪魔の樹)	Takashi Sakuma	Yukito Kizawa	October 14, 2018	February 17, 2019	
52	3	"The End Mountains"; Transliteration: "Hate no Sanmyaku" (Japanese: 果ての山脈)	Shunsuke Ishikawa	Ko Nekota	October 21, 2018	February 24, 2019	
53	4	"Departure"; Transliteration: "Tabidachi" (Japanese: 旅立ち)	Michiru Itabisashi	Ko Nekota	October 28, 2018	March 3, 2019	
54	5	"Ocean Turtle"; Transliteration: "Ōshan Tātoru" (Japanese: オーシャン・タートル)	Kōji Kobayashi	Yukito Kizawa	November 4, 2018	March 10, 2019	
55	6	"Project Alicization"; Transliteration: "Arishiazēshon Keikaku" (Japanese: アリシアゼーション計画)	Hiroki Hirano	Yukito Kizawa	November 11, 2018	March 24, 2019 (Note: The English dub of episode 6 of Alicization originally aired on March 17, but due to a broadcast error six minutes into the episode that caused it to freeze, it had to be skipped to the first half of episode 12 of Megalobox. The full uninterrupted episode was uploaded hours later on Adult Swim's website. Toonami re-aired the episode on March 24, pushing back episode 7 for a back-to-back airing with episode 8 the following week on March 31.)	
56	7	"Swordcraft Academy"; Transliteration: "Ken no Manabiya" (Japanese: 剣の学び舎)	Shunsuke Ishikawa	Ko Nekota	November 18, 2018	March 31, 2019	
57	8	"Swordsman's Pride"; Transliteration: "Kenshi no Kyōji" (Japanese: 剣士の矜持)	Shigeki Kawai	Yukito Kizawa	November 25, 2018	March 31, 2019	
58	9	"Nobleman's Responsibilities"; Transliteration: "Kizoku no Sekimu" (Japanese: 貴族の責務)	Michiru Itabisashi	Munemasa Nakamoto, Yukito Kizawa	December 2, 2018	April 7, 2019	
59	10	"Taboo Index"; Transliteration: "Kinki Mokuroku" (Japanese: 禁忌目録)	Shunsuke Nakashige	Munemasa Nakamoto	December 9, 2018	April 7, 2019	
60	11	"Central Cathedral"; Transliteration: "Sentoraru Kasedoraru" (Japanese: セントラル・カセドラル)	Satoshi Saga	Munemasa Nakamoto	December 16, 2018	April 14, 2019	
61	12	"The Sage of the Library"; Transliteration: "Tosho-shitsu no Kenja" (Japanese: 図書室の賢者)	Tsuyoshi Tobita	Munemasa Nakamoto, Yukito Kizawa	December 23, 2018	April 21, 2019	
62	13	"Ruler and Mediator"; Transliteration: "Shihai-sha to Chōtei-sha" (Japanese: 支配者と調停者)	Hiroshi Kimura	Munemasa Nakamoto, Yukito Kizawa	January 6, 2019	April 28, 2019	
Part 2: Alicization Rising
63	14	"The Crimson Knight"; Transliteration: "Guren no Kishi" (Japanese: 紅蓮の騎士)	Shunsuke Ishikawa	Munemasa Nakamoto	January 13, 2019	May 5, 2019	
64	15	"The Relentless Knight"; Transliteration: "Retsujitsu no Kishi" (Japanese: 烈日の騎士)	Hirotaka Tokuda	Munemasa Nakamoto	January 20, 2019	May 12, 2019	
65	16	"The Osmanthus Knight"; Transliteration: "Kinmokusei no Kishi" (Japanese: 金木犀の騎士)	Saori Den	Munemasa Nakamoto	January 27, 2019	May 19, 2019	
66	17	"Truce"; Transliteration: "Kyūsen Kyōtei" (Japanese: 休戦協定)	Michiru Itabisashi	Yukito Kizawa	February 3, 2019	May 26, 2019	
67	18	"The Legendary Hero"; Transliteration: "Densetsu no Eiyū" (Japanese: 伝説の英雄)	Ken Takahashi	Yukito Kizawa	February 10, 2019	June 2, 2019	
68	19	"The Seal of the Right Eye"; Transliteration: "Migime no Fūin" (Japanese: 右目の封印)	Shunsuke Ishikawa	Yukito Kizawa	February 24, 2019	June 9, 2019	
69	20	"Synthesis"; Transliteration: "Shinsesaizu" (Japanese: シンセサイズ)	Satoshi Saga, Takuma Suzuki	Yukito Kizawa	March 3, 2019	June 16, 2019	
Part 3: Alicization Uniting
70	21	"The 32nd Knight"; Transliteration: "San jū ni-banme no kishi" (Japanese: 三十二番目の騎士)	Shunsuke Nakashige	Yukito Kizawa	March 10, 2019	June 23, 2019	
71	22	"Titan of the Sword"; Transliteration: "Ken no Kyojin" (Japanese: 剣の巨人)	Hiroshi Kimura	Munemasa Nakamoto	March 17, 2019	June 30, 2019	
72	23	"Administrator"; Transliteration: "Adominisutorēta" (Japanese: アドミニストレータ)	Hirotaka Tokuda, Yūsuke Maruyama, Michiru Itabisashi	Yukito Kizawa	March 24, 2019	July 7, 2019	
73	24	"My Hero"; Transliteration: "Boku no Eiyū" (Japanese: ぼくの英雄)	Takashi Sakuma, Manabu Ono	Yukito Kizawa	March 31, 2019	July 14, 2019	

Story	Episode	Title	Directed by	Written by	Original release date	English airdate	Ref.
Part 4: Alicization Invading
74	25	"In the Far North"; Transliteration: "Kita no Ji Nite" (Japanese: 北の地にて)	Takashi Sakuma	Munemasa Nakamoto	October 13, 2019 (Note: The first 2 episodes were screened on October 6, 2019 at Madman Anime Festival Perth, Australia, and at Anime Fest @ NYCC in New York City, United States.)	January 19, 2020	
75	26	"Raids"; Transliteration: "Shuugeki" (Japanese: 襲撃)	Takehiro Miura	Munemasa Nakamoto	October 20, 2019	January 26, 2020	
76	27	"The Final Load Test"; Transliteration: "Saishū Fuka Jikken" (Japanese: 最終負荷実験)	Hiroshi Kimura	Munemasa Nakamoto	October 27, 2019	February 2, 2020	
77	28	"Dark Territory"; Transliteration: "Dāku Teritorī" (Japanese: ダークテリトリー)	Naomi Nakayama, Takashi Sakuma	Yukito Kizawa	November 3, 2019	February 9, 2020	
78	29	"The Night Before Battle"; Transliteration: "Kaisen Zenya" (Japanese: 開戦前夜)	Chiku Onoue	Yukito Kizawa	November 10, 2019	February 16, 2020	
Part 5: Alicization Exploding
79	30	"Battle of the Knights"; Transliteration: "Kishi-tachi no Tatakai" (Japanese: 騎士たちの戦い)	Takuma Suzuki	Yukito Kizawa	November 17, 2019	February 23, 2020	
80	31	"Stigma of the Disqualified"; Transliteration: "Shikkaku-sha no Rakuin" (Japanese: 失格者の烙印)	Hideya Ito	Kohei Urushibara	November 24, 2019	March 1, 2020	
81	32	"Blood and Life"; Transliteration: "Chi to Inochi" (Japanese: 血と命)	Shunsuke Nakashige	Munemasa Nakamoto	December 1, 2019	March 8, 2020	
82	33	"Sword and Fist"; Transliteration: "Ken to Ken" (Japanese: 剣と拳)	Hiroshi Kimura	Kohei Urushibara	December 8, 2019	March 15, 2020	
83	34	"Stacia, the Goddess of Creation"; Transliteration: "Sōsei Shin Suteishia" (Japanese: 創世神ステイシア)	Takashi Sakuma	Kohei Urushibara	December 15, 2019	March 22, 2020	
Part 6: Alicization Awakening
84	35	"Heartless Choice"; Transliteration: "Hijō no Sentaku" (Japanese: 非情の選択)	Akira Yamada	Munemasa Nakamoto	December 22, 2019	March 29, 2020	
85	36	"Ray of Light"; Transliteration: "Hitosuji no Hikari" (Japanese: 一筋の光)	Kenji Seto, Shunsuke Nakashige	Munemasa Nakamoto	December 29, 2019	April 5, 2020	
86	37	"The War of Underworld"; Transliteration: "Andāwārudo Taisen" (Japanese: アンダーワールド大戦)	Manabu Ono	Kohei Urushibara	July 12, 2020	November 8, 2020	
87	38	"End to Eternity"; Transliteration: "Mugen no Hate" (Japanese: 無限の果て)	Toru Hamasaki	Kohei Urushibara	July 19, 2020	November 15, 2020	
88	39	"Instigation"; Transliteration: "Sendō" (Japanese: 扇動)	Takehiro Miura	Munemasa Nakamoto	July 26, 2020	November 22, 2020	
89	40	"Code 871"; Transliteration: "Kōdo Hachi-Nana-Ichi" (Japanese: コード871)	Takashi Sakuma	Kohei Urushibara	August 2, 2020	December 6, 2020	
90	41	"Prince of Hell"; Transliteration: "Akuma no Ko" (Japanese: 悪魔の子)	Akira Yamada	Munemasa Nakamoto	August 9, 2020	December 13, 2020	
Part 7: Alicization Lasting
91	42	"Memories"; Transliteration: "Kioku" (Japanese: 記憶)	Yuya Horiuchi	Munemasa Nakamoto	August 16, 2020	January 3, 2021	
92	43	"Awakening"; Transliteration: "Kakusei" (Japanese: 覚醒)	Shunsuke Nakashige	Kohei Urushibara	August 23, 2020	January 10, 2021	
93	44	"The Night-Sky Blade"; Transliteration: "Yozora no Ken" (Japanese: 夜空の剣)	Masakazu Kohara	Munemasa Nakamoto	August 30, 2020	January 17, 2021	
94	45	"Beyond Time"; Transliteration: "Toki no Kanata" (Japanese: 時の彼方)	Tomoya Tanaka	Munemasa Nakamoto	September 6, 2020	January 24, 2021	
95	46	"Alice"; Transliteration: "Arisu" (Japanese: アリス)	Akira Yamada	Munemasa Nakamoto	September 13, 2020	January 31, 2021	
96	47	"New World"; Transliteration: "Nyū Wārudo" (Japanese: ニューワールド)	Takashi Sakuma	Munemasa Nakamoto	September 20, 2020	February 7, 2021	

== See also ==
- Sword Art Online Abridged, an American web series adapting/abridging the first season of Sword Art Online
