= Takayuki Hirao =

Japanese anime director

- 平尾隆之
- Born: January 10, 1979 (age 47); Tsuda, Kagawa, Japan
- Occupation: Anime director

Takayuki Hirao (平尾 隆之, Hirao Takayuki) is a Japanese anime director credited for work with Ufotable on The Garden of Sinners: Paradox Spiral, Gyo, Majocco Shimai no Yoyo to Nene, and God Eater.

== Filmography ==
=== Anime ===
Year	Title	Crew role
2005	Futakoi Alternative	Director
2009	God Eater (OVA)	Director
2015–16	God Eater (TV)	Director

=== Films ===
Year	Title	Crew role
2008	Kara no Kyoukai: Paradox Spiral	Director
2012	Gyo	Director
2013	Magical Sisters Yoyo and Nene	Director
2021	Pompo: The Cinéphile	Director
TBA	Wasted Chef	Director
