= Wasted Chef =

Upcoming Japanese animated film by Takayuki Hirao

- ウェイステッド・シェフ
- Directed by: Takayuki Hirao
- Written by: Takayuki Hirao
- Produced by: Kōsuke Arai; Ryōichirō Matsuo; Yūnosuke Uno
- Music by: Kenta Matsukuma
- Production company: CLAP
- Distributed by: Kadokawa Animation
- Country: Japan
- Language: Japanese

Wasted Chef is an upcoming original anime film written and directed by Takayuki Hirao, produced by CLAP and distributed by Kadokawa Animation. It features character designs by Shingo Adachi and music by Kenta Matsukama, both of whom previously worked with Hirao on the 2021 anime film Pompo: The Cinéphile. The project was first announced during a screening for Pompo: The Cinéphile at a film festival held at New Chitose Airport in November 2024, where artwork produced for it was shown. The film was previewed at the Annecy Animation Showcase at the 2026 Cannes Film Festival in May 2026.

== Manga adaptation ==
A manga adaptation, illustrated by Aero05, began serialization in Kadokawa Shoten's Young Ace magazine on June 4, 2026.
