= Sword Art Online (TV series) =

Japanese anime television series

- Also known as: List: Sword Art Online II (S2); Sword Art Online: Alicization (#50–73); Sword Art Online: Alicization – War of Underworld (#74–96)
- ソードアート・オンライン; Sōdo Āto Onrain
- Genre: Adventure; Science fiction
- Based on: Sword Art Online by Reki Kawahara (Note: Author) and Abec (Note: Illustrator)
- Directed by: Tomohiko Itō (S1–2); Manabu Ono (S3)
- Voices of: Yoshitsugu Matsuoka; Haruka Tomatsu; Kanae Itō; Ayana Taketatsu; Miyuki Sawashiro; Nobunaga Shimazaki; Ai Kayano
- Music by: Yuki Kajiura
- Country of origin: Japan
- Original language: Japanese
- No. of seasons: 3
- No. of episodes: 96 + SP (list of episodes)

Production
- Executive producers: Tomonori Ochikoshi (S1–2); Masuo Ueda (S1); Jun Katou (S3); Hiroyuki Shimizu (#50–62); Shinichiro Kashiwada (#63–96)
- Producers: List: Nobuhiro Ōsawa (chief); Atsuhiro Iwakami (chief; S1–2); Kazuma Miki (S1–2 / chief; S3); Shinichiro Kashiwada (S1–2 / chief; #50–62); Nobuhiro Nakayama (chief; #74–96); Yōsuke Futami (S2–3); Masami Niwa (S3); Misato Aoki (S3); Kaoru Adachi (S3); Ryūtarō Kawakami (S3); Takaaki Yuasa (#50–73); Keisuke Hirai (#74–96)
- Cinematography: Mutsumi Usuda (S1–2); Takeshi Hirooka (S1); Kentarō Waki (S3); Kenta Hayashi (#50–85); Shōta Kodera (#86–96)
- Animator: A-1 Pictures (Note: Main Animators: Atsushi Saitō (S1); Kengo Matsumoto (S2))
- Editors: Shigeru Nishiyama (S1–2); Yūji Kondō (S3)
- Running time: 23 minutes; 25 minutes (#25); 47 minutes (#50); 100 minutes (special)
- Production companies: Aniplex; Kadokawa (Note: Credited through its internal division and brand company ASCII Media Works (S1–2)); Bandai Namco Entertainment (Note: Formerly known as Namco Bandai Games (S1) and Bandai Namco Games (S2)); Genco (S1–2); Straight Edge (S3); Egg Firm (S3)

Original release
- Network: Tokyo MX, GYT, GTV, tvk (S1), BS11 (S3)
- Release: July 8, 2012 – September 20, 2020

Related
- Sword Art Online Alternative: Gun Gale Online (2018–2024)

Sword Art Online (Japanese: ソードアート・オンライン, Hepburn: Sōdo Āto Onrain) is a Japanese anime television series produced by A-1 Pictures, based on the light novel series Sword Art Online written by Reki Kawahara and illustrated by Abec. It takes place in the 2020s and focuses on protagonists Kazuto "Kirito" Kirigaya and Asuna Yuuki as they play through various VRMMORPG worlds, and later their involvement in the matters of a simulated civilization. The anime aired a total of three seasons from July 2012 to September 2020. An anime television film, titled Sword Art Online: Extra Edition, was released in December 2013.

== Series overview ==
Season	Episodes		Originally released	
Season	Episodes		First released	Last released
1	25		July 8, 2012	December 23, 2012
2	24		July 5, 2014	December 20, 2014
3	47	24	October 7, 2018	March 31, 2019
3	47	12	October 13, 2019	December 29, 2019
3	47	11	July 12, 2020	September 20, 2020

== Release ==
An anime adaptation of Sword Art Online was announced at Dengeki Bunko Autumn Festival 2011, along with Reki Kawahara's other light novel series, Accel World. The anime is produced by Aniplex and Genco, animated by A-1 Pictures, and directed by Tomohiko Ito, with music by Yuki Kajiura. The anime aired on Tokyo MX, tvk, TVS, TV Aichi, RKB, HBC, and MBS between July 8 and December 23, 2012, and on AT-X, Chiba TV, and BS11 at later dates. The series was also streamed on Crunchyroll and Hulu. The anime is adapted from the first four novels and parts of volume 8.

The anime has been licensed in North America by Aniplex of America and an English-language dub premiered on Adult Swim's Toonami from July 28, 2013, to February 16, 2014. The series was released by Aniplex of America in four DVD and Blu-ray sets, with special extras on the BD sets, between August 13 and November 19, 2013. Manga Entertainment released the first series on BD/DVD in the United Kingdom in December 2013, while Madman Entertainment released the series in Australia and the English-language version began airing on ABC Me on June 7, 2014.

A year-end special, titled Sword Art Online Extra Edition, aired on December 31, 2013. The special recapped the previously aired anime series and included some new footage. Extra Edition was streamed worldwide a few hours after its airing in Japan. The two-hour-long special was available on Daisuki worldwide except French-speaking areas, as well as China and Korea. Daisuki offered subtitles in various languages such as English, Spanish, Portuguese, Italian, and German. English-speaking countries, Mexico, Central and South America could also watch the stream on Crunchyroll. Extra Edition was also simulcast in South Korea on Aniplus cable channel and in China on the LeTV streaming website. French-speaking countries could watch on the Wakanim streaming website. The Blu-ray and DVD of Extra Edition was released on April 23, 2014, in Japan. The limited edition included a Yui character song titled "Heart Sweet Heart" by Kanae Itō and an original side-story written by Kawahara titled "Sword Art Online: Niji no Hashi" (ソードアート・オンライン 虹の橋, Sōdo Āto Onrain: Niji no Hashi; Sword Art Online: Rainbow Bridge).

At the end of the special, the anime television series was confirmed for a second season, titled Sword Art Online II, which premiered on July 5, 2014. The first 14 episodes of the second season are an adaptation of volumes 5 and 6 of the light novels that cover the Phantom Bullet arc. Episodes 15 to 17 cover the Calibur arc from volume 8 of the novels, with episodes 18 to 24 covering volume 7 of the novels, the Mother's Rosario arc. Premiere screening events of the second season were held in the United States, France, Germany, Hong Kong, South Korea, Taiwan, and Japan before the television premiere between June 29 and July 4, 2014. At Katsucon, it was announced that the English dub of the second season would air on Toonami beginning March 29, 2015.

The third season of Sword Art Online, titled Sword Art Online: Alicization, and a spin-off anime, titled Sword Art Online Alternative Gun Gale Online, were announced in 2017. Sword Art Online Alternative Gun Gale Online, animated by 3Hz, premiered in April 2018. Sword Art Online: Alicization aired from October 7, 2018, to March 31, 2019, with a one-hour world premiere that aired in Japan, the United States, Australia, France, Germany, Russia, and South Korea on September 15, 2018. The English dub of the third season premiered on February 10, 2019, on Toonami. The season was originally announced to air for four cours, and adapt from the novel's ninth volume, Alicization Beginning, to the eighteenth volume, Alicization Lasting. However, the season ended with episode 24 – completing the fourteenth volume of the novel, Alicization Uniting – and continued that same year on October 13, with a second part titled War of Underworld. The second half of War of Underworld was originally scheduled to premiere in April 2020, but due to the COVID-19 pandemic in Japan, it was rescheduled to air from July 12 to September 20, 2020.

== Music ==
Yuki Kajiura composed the soundtrack for the Sword Art Online anime, which was later released in the limited edition of the anime's fourth and seventh Blu-ray and DVD volumes. The first volume of the second season's soundtrack was bundled with the limited edition of the season's third and seventh Blu-ray and DVD ones.

From episodes 1 until 14 episodes of Season 1, the opening theme song is "Crossing Field" by Lisa , and the ending theme song is "Yume Sekai" (ユメセカイ; Dream World) by Haruka Tomatsu. From episode 15 onwards, the opening theme is "Innocence" by Eir Aoi, and the ending theme is "Overfly" by Luna Haruna. The theme song of Sword Art Online: Extra Edition is "Niji no Oto" (虹の音; Sound of the Rainbow) by Eir Aoi.

For Season 2, the first opening theme is "Ignite" by Eir Aoi, and the first ending theme is "Startear" by Haruna. The second opening theme is "Courage" by Tomatsu, while the second and ending themes – "No More Time Machine" and "Shirushi" (シルシ; Sign) respectively – are sung by Lisa. The song "Catch the Moment" by Lisa is used as the theme song to Sword Art Online: Ordinal Scale.

For the third season, the first opening theme is "Adamas" by Lisa while the corresponding ending theme is "Iris" (アイリス, Airisu) by Eir Aoi. The second opening theme is "Resister" by Asca, and the second ending theme is "Forget-me-not" by Reona, with episode 19 featuring "Niji no Kanata ni" (虹の彼方に; Beyond the Rainbow), also sung by Reona.

For the second half of the third season, the first opening theme is "Resolution" by Tomatsu, and the first ending theme is "Unlasting" by Lisa. The second opening theme is "Anima" by Reona, and the second ending theme is "I will..." by Eir Aoi. The song "Yuke" (往け) by LiSA was used as the theme song to Sword Art Online Progressive: Aria of a Starless Night, while the song "Shinzō" (心臓; Heart) by Eir Aoi was used as the theme song to Sword Art Online Progressive: Scherzo of Deep Night.

A number of character songs were included in the Blu-ray and DVD volume releases of the anime. These were collected into two compilation albums: Sword Art Online Song Collection, which included character songs released in the season one volumes, was released on August 27, 2014, while Sword Art Online Song Collection II, which included character songs released in the season two volumes, was released on March 22, 2017.

Wanting to celebrate the anime's tenth anniversary, the song "Sо̄kyū no Fanfare" (蒼穹のファンファーレ, Sōkyū no Fanfāre) was used as the theme song for the commemorative event "Sword Art Online: Full Dive", held on November 6, 2022. The song was composed by Yuki Kajiura and performed by Reona, Asca, and Eir Aoi, who were in charge of previous opening and ending themes for the series.

== Reception ==
Richard Eisenbeis of Kotaku hailed Sword Art Online as the smartest series in recent years, praising its deep insight on the psychological aspects of virtual reality on the human psyche, its sociological views on creating a realistic economy and society in a massively multiplayer online game setting, and the writing staff's ability to juggle a wide variety of genres within the series. Eisenbeis particularly noted how the romance between Kirito and Asuna brings "definition to exactly what love is like in a virtual world." However, at the time of this preliminary review, he had only watched the first 12 episodes of the series. He has since gone on to review the second half of the series, lauding its excellent use of plot twists and praising its well-written and believable villain. Moreover, Eisenbeis felt that some of the initial positive aspects of the series were lost in the second half, such as the focus on psychological repercussions and social interactions that could be seen in an online game. Criticism was also levied towards the aspect of turning Asuna into a damsel in distress, stating that a female lead as strong as her was "reduced to nothing but the quest item the male lead is hunting for." Eisenbeis closed his review of the series by stating regarding the two halves: "However, both are enjoyable for what they are."

Rebecca Silverman of Anime News Network criticized the series as having pacing problems, logical gaps and "sloppy writing". Theron Martin of the same website criticized the story as struggling "to achieve and maintain the level of gravitas that life-or-death danger should have", while calling it unwilling to commit to Kirito's "lone wolf" image.

Anime News Network reviewer Theron Martin praised the anime adaptation of the Alicization arc, describing the opening episode as "about the best adaptation that could be hoped for of the relevant source material".

Piotr Konieczny writing for The Encyclopedia of Science Fiction described Sword Art Online as a major cultural phenomenon that helped popularize virtual reality gaming narratives, LitRPG and isekai-related fiction worldwide. It emphasized the series' comparatively optimistic portrayal of virtual worlds as environments capable of fostering love, community and personal growth, contrasting this approach with the darker visions of cyberspace found in earlier science fiction. The entry noted praise for the animation, Yuki Kajiura's music, Kirito and Asuna's romance, and the increasingly ambitious exploration of artificial consciousness in later story arcs. However, it also highlighted criticism of uneven pacing, narrative inconsistencies, convenient resolutions and Kirito's overpowered characterization. Particular criticism concerned the treatment of female characters, including Asuna's diminished agency in the Alfheim arc and the recurring use of sexual violence as a plot device. Despite these shortcomings, Konieczny regarded the franchise as exceptionally influential, arguing that Kirito helped establish a commercially dominant archetype of the powerful, romantically sought-after gamer protagonist.

== Sword Art Online Abridged ==
Sword Art Online Abridged is a Canadian abridged fantasy web series parodying Sword Art Online. The series was created by Something Witty Entertainment and first aired on March 30, 2013, predating the official English dub release. The second season premiered on December 14, 2017, with its final episode in its development stages. The success of the series led to Something Witty Entertainment posting similarly abridged versions of My Hero Academia and Fruits Basket on its YouTube channel.

The story of Sword Art Online Abridged is similar to the original. The players of the MMORPG Sword Art Online are trapped in the game and must beat all 100 floors of Aincrad to escape. If the players die in-game or their headset is removed, they die in real life. However, SAO Abridged changes the character's personalities significantly and creates new storylines.

Of the recurring cast, Jon Swinnard (known online as CheesemanJoe) and Anthony DiMascio (known online as Dizzasta) play as Klein (Username: BallsDeep69), a 'friend' of Kirito. Klein's username, which has been changed from his original counterpart to BallsDeep69, is a running gag in the series.

The series received a positive critical reception, receiving praise for its improvements to the original's pacing and storylines. Some critics considered Kirito and Asuna's romance to be greatly improved from the original series.
