= Occult Academy =

Japanese anime television series

- Occult Academy title card

世紀末オカルト学院 (Seikimatsu Okaruto Gakuin)
- Genre: Fantasy, Supernatural
- Created by: A-1 Pictures
- Anime television series
- Directed by: Tomohiko Itō
- Produced by: Masatoshi Fujimoto; Shinnosuke Wada
- Written by: Seishi Minakami
- Music by: Elements Garden
- Studio: A-1 Pictures
- Licensed by: NA: NIS America
- Original network: TV Tokyo
- Original run: July 6, 2010 – September 27, 2010
- Episodes: 13

Occult Academy (世紀末オカルト学院, Seikimatsu Okaruto Gakuin; "End of Century Occult Academy") is a Japanese anime television series produced by A-1 Pictures and Aniplex and directed by Tomohiko Itō. The 13-episode anime premiered in Japan on the TV Tokyo television network on July 6, 2010. Occult Academy is the third and final project of Anime no Chikara. It was shown by Crunchyroll an hour after the Japanese broadcast. A manga adaptation of the anime is currently serialized in Media Factory's Monthly Comic Alive. A series of DVD/Blu-ray releases are made over six volumes. Volumes one through five each contain two episodes from the series and comes with extras, such as bonus songs sung by various voice actors for the characters. The final volume covers the last three episodes. There are also four spinoff episodes, the first of which is included with the second volume. The series has been picked up in North America by NIS America, who released the series on Blu-ray on May 8, 2012.

== Plot ==
Maya is the daughter of the former Headmaster of Waldstein Academy. In 2012, the world is invaded by aliens, and time travelers like Fumiaki are sent back to the year 1999 to prevent apocalypse by destroying the Nostradamus Key. In 1999, Maya returns to the Academy as headmaster with the intention of destroying it. Her plan is interrupted when she meets Fumiaki and learns of the forthcoming destruction. They form a pact to look for the Key.

In order to find the Key, time agents were provided with specially created cell phones. By using the phone, Maya and Fumiaki investigate occult occurrences.

== Characters ==
Maya Kumashiro (神代 マヤ, Kumashiro Maya)
Voiced by: Yōko Hikasa
The daughter of the Waldstein Academy's late headmaster, Junichirou Kumashiro. She hates the occult despite her vast knowledge about it. Her hatred stems from her father's obsession with the occult thus causing a strained relationship between his wife and daughter. After her father's death, Maya becomes headmistress of the "Occult Academy" and vows to destroy the school. However, as the series progresses, Maya's hatred for the occult lessens. Eventually she regains her former love for the occult, promising to keep it safe rather than to destroy it. Later, it is revealed that the Academy was Maya's Christmas present from her father. Maya realizes that she turned her back on her father when he was only trying to fulfill her Christmas wish. She then makes a promise to her dead father to save the Academy and the World. With the arrival of Fumiaki Uchida, she forms a partnership with him in order to find the key of Nostradamus which will cause an alien invasion on July 21, 1999.
Fumiaki Uchida (内田 文明, Uchida Fumiaki)
Voiced by: Takahiro Mizushima, Sayuri Yahagi (young)
A time traveler from 2012 who is sent to 1999 to find the key of Nostradamus. He is forced to become #6 after the agent before him, #5, was killed. In 1999, Fumiaki was a little boy with special psychic powers. Dubbed "Uchida Bunmei", he appeared on many television shows, demonstrating his psychic powers by bending a spoon. His popularity grew quickly, but it came at a heavy cost. As he became more popular, his mother became obsessed with his fame, to the point that she refuses him a normal social life. Fumiaki eventually loses his psychic powers, and by 2012, he was considered a fake. He is also known as "Abe Minoru", which is the collective identity for all of the time agents.
Upon arriving in 1999, Fumiaki encounters Maya, who thought of him as a coward at first, since all he would do is run in fear. However, after Maya sees part of his life in a near-death experience and realizes that he, like her, was also a lonely child he earns some respect. He and Maya form a team to find the Nostradamus Key and prevent the alien invasion.
Mikaze Nakagawa (中川 美風, Nakagawa Mikaze)
Voiced by: Minori Chihara
Mikaze is a cute teenage girl who works at a local diner. Her cooking skills are extremely outstanding, and Fumiaki Uchida eats at her diner everyday. However, despite her cute and cheerful personality, Mikaze is not a normal teenage girl.
Chihiro Kawashima (川島 千尋, Kawashima Chihiro)
Voiced by: Yū Kobayashi
Chihiro serves as the vice-principal for Waldstein Academy. She is depicted as a stern woman, although with a penchant for keeping a love diary. She is very much infatuated with Bunmei, and develops a hatred for Mikaze because of that.
Ami Kuroki (黒木 亜美, Kuroki Ami)
Voiced by: Ayahi Takagaki
Ami is Maya's childhood friend as well as classmate in the Academy. She genuinely cares for Maya and tries to soften Maya's hatred of the occult. Ami is often seen with Kozue, JK, and Smile.
Kozue Naruse (成瀬 こずえ, Naruse Kozue)
Voiced by: Kana Hanazawa
Kozue is Ami's friend and classmate at the Academy. She deeply embraces the occult, as shown through her endeavors to prove to Maya that the occult is very real including agreeing to go through a near death experience for a class demonstration. Kozue is portrayed as a being very clumsy, and is often the first to fall victim to demons.
Smile (スマイル, Sumairu)
Voiced by: Hiroki Takahashi
Smile acts as the mechanic for the Academy. He first meets Maya and the others when Ami requested his and JK's help to find the possessed former principal. Smile is shown to be very adept at physical combat although he often carries an enormous wrench as a weapon. He usually appears with JK.
JK
Voiced by: Takehito Koyasu
JK is an occult dowser who specializes in using dowsing rods to locate supernatural phenomena. Like Kozue, he is also an occult maniac and often accompanies the other characters when occult-related events occur. He is able to engage in combat using his dowsing rods, but usually relies on Smile to get him out of trouble.

== Reception ==
Anime News Network's Zac Bertschy sees that the "animation and character designs are gorgeous, with some really nice background work" and "an incredibly strong start to a show with huge promise". Theron Martin says that the series "is one of the best-looking series of the new season (maybe the best), including some beautiful background art, nice animation courtesy of A-1 Pictures, and character designs that certainly won't bore". Carl Kimlinger finds that the series "is, if not the best, certainly the most entertaining of the series to emerge from Aniplex's Anime no Chikara project" and "is more Sam Raimi than Tite Kubo". Hope Chapman comments that "it's still incredibly entertaining in a pure, enchanting way, a little reminiscent of the most humorous bits in Mamoru Hosoda's films".

== Musicography ==
=== Main theme ===
Opening theme "Flying Humanoid"
Lyrics, music, arrangement: Kenta Matsukuma. Vocal artist: Shoko Nakagawa. Label: Sony Music Records
Ending theme "Kimi ga iru basho" ('The Place Where You Are')
Lyrics: Masato Nakayama (Elements Garden). Music, arrangement: Junpei Fujita (Elements Garden). Vocal artist: Ayahi Takagaki. Label: Music Ray'n

=== Background music ===
- Piano: Lisa Nakazono
  - Beethoven, Piano Sonata No. 21 ("Waldstein" sonata) (Episodes #1 ~ 13)
  - Liszt, studio La Campanella (Episodes #3~5, 10, 12)

=== Preview music ===
The previews with scenes from the next episode featured hit music from the latter 1990s, sung by female characters in the video. One of these songs, "White Love" was not from Sony Music, but from a rival label Toy's Factory.

"Love Machine" (Episodes #1, 12)
Maya Kumashiro (Yōko Hikasa) (#1); Sasazuka Exo Sister (#12)
"Be Together" (#2, 3)
Mikaze Nakagawa(Minori Chihara)
"Asia no Junshin" (#4, 5)
Kozue Naruse (Kana Hanazawa)
"Hot Limit" (#6, 7)
Ami Kuroki (Ayahi Takagaki)
"White Love" (#8, 9)
Akari Okamoto (Inori Minase)
"Rōningyō no yakata '99" (#10, 11)
Chihiro Kawashima (Yū Kobayashi)
