= Yoyo and Nene, the Little Witch Sisters =

2013 film directed by Takayuki Hirao

- Directed by: Takayuki Hirao
- Screenplay by: Kazuharu Sato; Takayuki Hirao; Takumi Minamijima
- Based on: Noroiya Shimai by Hirarin
- Produced by: Rie Shima; Hikaru Kondo; Sanae Miki
- Starring: Sumire Morohoshi; Ai Kakuma
- Edited by: Tsuyoshi Imai
- Music by: Go Shiina
- Production company: Ufotable
- Distributed by: King Records
- Release dates: October 12, 2013 (Scotland Loves Anime); December 28, 2013 (Japan)
- Running time: 100 minutes
- Country: Japan
- Language: Japanese

Yoyo and Nene, the Little Witch Sisters (魔女っこ姉妹のヨヨとネネ, Majokko Shimai no Yoyo to Nene) is a 2013 Japanese animated fantasy film directed by Takayuki Hirao, based on the Noroiya Shimai series of Japanese comics by Hirarin.

It is also known in English as Magical Sisters Yoyo and Nene, Little Witches Yoyo & Nene, or Magical Witches Yoyo and Nene, or Magical Sisters Yoyo & Nene.

== Cast ==
- Sumire Morohoshi as Yoyo
- Ai Kakuma as Nene
- Takahiro Sakurai as Takeo
- Miyuki Sawashiro as Takahiro
- Rio Sasaki as Aki

== Plot ==
Yoyo and Nene work as "noroiya" (cursers) using magic in a fantasy world. One day a big tree suddenly appears in a forest, and tall buildings that look like they are from another world (our world) can be seen entangled in it. The two sisters go there to investigate, and Yoyo gets transported to our world. Yoyo then encounters two children who are startled by her sudden appearance and rush back home. But, at home they find their parents turning into monsters.
