= Daisuki (website) =

Defunct Japanese anime streaming website

- Website type: Video streaming service
- Dissolved: 11:59, October 31, 2017 (+09:00)
- Headquarters: Tokyo, Japan
- Area served: Worldwide
- Industry: Anime; Video on Demand
- Parent: Anime Consortium Japan; Bandai Namco Holdings
- Website: Daisuki.net (Archived)
- Registration: Optional
- Launched: May 16, 2013; 13 years ago
- Current status: Defunct

Daisuki (Japanese: 株式会社ダイスキ, Hepburn: Kabushiki-gaisha Daisuki) was a Japanese website focused on streaming anime content, which was founded in 2013 by Asatsu-DK and six production companies: Toei Animation, Aniplex, Sunrise, TMS Entertainment, Nihon Ad Systems, and Dentsu. Daisuki was managed by Anime Consortium Japan, an anime content joint venture financed by Asatsu-DK, Bandai Namco, the Cool Japan Fund, and several animation studios, and which is currently managed by Bandai Namco.

The service was terminated on October 31, 2017, at 11:59 JST. However, streaming of Dragon Ball Super continued until February 22, 2018, when it was transferred to Dragon Ball Super Card Game.

== Content ==
Originally airing 30 episodes of content on May 16, the first series to be included were Sword Art Online, Puella Magi Madoka Magica, The Prince of Tennis: The National Tournament, Lupin III: Part II, Mobile Suit Z Gundam, and Mobile Suit Gundam SEED.

== History ==
Originally set to launch in April 2013, Daisuki was delayed until May 16, 2013. The initial media services were streaming over the web, with future plans to expand for mobile devices and the PlayStation 3 and Xbox 360 consoles. In October 2013, they released an iPad app, followed by an iPhone app in February 2014, and an Android app in January 2015.

== Operation ==
Founded on October 17, 2012, Daisuki Inc. was a joint venture between Asatsu-DK and six major anime studios. The venture's backers by initial shareholder stakes were split with minority shares amongst all backers. The largest minority shareholder is Asatsu-DK with 121,000,000 yen for a 26.3% stake; Toei Animation, Aniplex, Sunrise, TMS Entertainment, and Nihon Ad Systems each have a 61,700,000 yen investment for 13.4% shares. Dentsu has 30,000,000 yen invested for a 6.5% stake. However, its capital on launch was noted to be 229,750,000 yen. The CEO was Kunihiko Shibata.

In an interview with Japanator, it was announced that the releases on Daisuki would be released worldwide without region restrictions except in cases of exclusive rights licensed by other companies.

Daisuki Inc, was folded in 2014 and replaced by Anime Consortium Japan (ACJ), which took over the operation of the Daisuki.net website. ACJ's initial shareholders included Bandai Namco Holding inc., Asatsu-DK inc., Aniplex inc., the Cool Japan Fund, Toei Animation, Sunrise, TMS Entertainment, Nihon Ad Systems, and Dentsu Inc. In 2015 they were joined by Kodansha, Shueisha, Shogakukan, Kadokawa, Bushiroad Inc., and Good Smile Company. Shin Unozawa, an executive vice president of Bandai Namco Entertainment, serves as ACJ's president and representative. In March 2017, Bandai Namco purchased the entirety of Anime Consortium Japan for 2.1 billion yen.

On August 1, 2017, Daisuki released a statement announcing the closure of their operations effective October 31, 2017. The service was terminated on October 31, 2017, at 11:59 JST. Despite this, Daisuki continued to stream Dragon Ball Super until February 22, 2018, where it was instead transferred over to Dragon Ball Super Card Game.
