= Tomohiko Itō (director) =

Japanese anime director

- 伊藤 智彦
- Born: October 20, 1978 (age 47); Kasugai, Aichi, Japan
- Other name: Kagurazaka Tokiichi (神楽坂 時市)
- Education: Tokyo University of Marine Science and Technology
- Occupation: Director

Tomohiko Itō (伊藤 智彦, Itō Tomohiko; born October 20, 1978) is a Japanese anime director, best known for directing the A-1 Pictures projects Occult Academy, the first season of Silver Spoon, the first two seasons of Sword Art Online, and Erased. He currently resides in Shinjuku, Tokyo.

== Career ==
After graduating from Tokyo University of Marine Science and Technology, Itō joined Madhouse and switched from being a production assistant to an episode director. He participated in various productions under the pseudonym of Kagurazaka Tokiichi from his time at Madhouse. The pen name is derived from the place where he lived and his grandfather's name. He worked as an assistant director on Death Note, The Girl Who Leapt Through Time and Summer Wars before making his directorial debut with Occult Academy.

He is a listener of the radio show Seishun Radio Mania and has transmit to the show that he will make his directorial debut with Occult Academy. He also requested Shoko Nakagawa's song "Flying Humanoid" for the October 16, 2010 broadcast.

On September 16, 2022, Itō launched his first manga series titled Wonder X with illustrations by Mekki Kuroyama in Kadokawa Shoten's Comic Newtype website.

== Filmography ==
=== TV series ===
- Occult Academy (2010) - Director
- Sword Art Online (2012) - Director
- Silver Spoon (2013) - Director
- Sword Art Online II (2014) - Director
- Erased (2016) - Director
- The Millionaire Detective Balance: Unlimited (2020) - Director

=== Films ===
- Sword Art Online: Extra Edition (2013) - Director
- Sword Art Online The Movie: Ordinal Scale (2017) - Director
- Hello World (2019) - Director
- Kusunoki no Bannin (2026) - Director
