= List of Sword Art Online light novels =

Sword Art Online
- Created by: Reki Kawahara & abec
- Owners: Dengeki Bunko (via ASCII Media Works); Yen Press (English)
- Years: 2009–present

Print publications
- Novels: Ongoing series: Sword Art Online (2009–present) Progressive (2012–present) Gun Gale Online (2014–present) Gourmet Seekers (2023–present) Material (2026–present): Ended series: Material Edition (2007–2019) Short stories (2009–2025) Clover's Regret (2016–2018): One-off novels: IF Official Novel Anthology (2023) Mystery Labyrinth (2023) Gambler's Honor (2026)

Sword Art Online is a Japanese light novel series written by Reki Kawahara with accompanying illustrations drawn by abec. The series takes place in the then near-future and focuses on various virtual reality MMORPG worlds. Originally self-published online under the pseudonym Fumio Kunori, ASCII Media Works began publishing the novels on April 10, 2009, under their Dengeki Bunko imprint. The series has since grown to 29 volumes as of April 10, 2026. Yen Press began publishing the novels in English in North America and the United Kingdom with the first volume on April 22, 2014. With more than 30 million copies in print worldwide, the novels are also published in China, Taiwan, South Korea, Thailand, Brazil, Russia, Germany, Poland, Austria, France, Switzerland, and Italy.

Kawahara also began writing another light novel series alongside the main story titled Sword Art Online: Progressive, which tells the story of Kirito and Asuna as they progressed through clearing Aincrad from the beginning. The first volume was released on October 10, 2012. As of November 10, 2026, ten volumes have been published as part of the Progressive series.

In addition to the main storyline, Kawahara has also written side stories, also called "extra stories", some of which have been included alongside the main story on his website (which has since been withdrawn since the start of commercial publication), in the main light novel series, and as parts of the Progressive light novel series. Many of them have been published as short stories, including the Material Edition series and others at COMITIA doujinshi conventions, in Dengeki Bunko Magazine, as part of Dengeki Fair and bookstore promotional events and exhibitions, included as limited edition bonuses in the anime Blu-rays/DVDs and a music single, in art books, at cinema showings of the anime films, and with themed airsoft guns. The doujinshi releases have included manga and other artwork by Kawahara himself. Some of the stories have been crossovers with the Accel World and The Irregular at Magic High School light novel series.

Aside from the light novels written by Kawahara, multiple spin-off light novel series have been published, written by other authors with Kawahara's supervision. These include the Sword Art Online Alternative Gun Gale Online series written by Keiichi Sigsawa and illustrated by Kouhaku Kuroboshi, the Sword Art Online Alternative Clover's Regret series written by Soichiro Watase and illustrated by Ginta, the Sword Art Online Alternative Gourmet Seekers series written by Y.A and illustrated by Megumi Nagahama, Sword Art Online Alternative Mystery Labyrinth written by Tenryū Konno and illustrated by Shiho Enta, and Sword Art Online Alternative Gambler's Honor written by Ren Sudou and illustrated by Enji. While these series take place in the same world as the main series written by Kawahara, they each feature different characters and stories than the main series.

== Volume list ==
=== Sword Art Online ===
No.	Title	Original release date	English release date
1	Sword Art Online 1: Aincrad; Ainkuraddo (アインクラッド)	April 10, 2009; 978-4-04-867760-8	April 22, 2014; 978-0-316-37124-7
Prologue; Chapters 1-25
Being one of the world's luckiest gamers, Kirito gets the chance to play Sword Art Online, the world's first ever VRMMORPG (Virtual Reality Massively Multiplayer Online Role Playing Game), only available to 10,000 people. Players immerse themselves into the game and are able to live a totally different life. However, all 10,000 players gets trapped in this game where game over in-game means death, both virtual and real. The only way to escape this game alive is to clear all 100 floors of Aincrad, but after having been trapped in this virtual world for two years, there are still 26 floors to clear with only 6,000 players left.
2	Sword Art Online 2: Aincrad; Ainkuraddo (アインクラッド)	August 10, 2009; 978-4-04-867935-0	August 26, 2014; 978-0-316-37681-5
Prologue; "The Black Swordsman" (黒の剣士, Kuro no Kenshi); "Warmth of the Heart" (心の温度, Kokoro no Ondo); "The Girl in the Morning Dew" (朝露の少女, Asatsuyu no Shoujo); "Red-Nosed Reindeer" (赤鼻のトナカイ, Akahana no Tonakai)
A collection of four short stories revolving around Kirito that take place when the players of Sword Art Online are trapped in the game.
3	Sword Art Online 3: Fairy Dance; Fearyi Dansu (フェアリィ・ダンス)	December 10, 2009; 978-4-04-868193-3	December 16, 2014; 978-0-316-29642-7
Prologue; Chapters 1-3
Kirito has finished the game Sword Art Online and has returned to reality. However, he soon discovers that Asuna and 300 other people are still stuck in-game. Kirito soon finds out that they are trapped in a game called Alfheim Online and rushes back into virtual reality to save Asuna.
4	Sword Art Online 4: Fairy Dance; Fearyi Dansu (フェアリィ・ダンス)	April 10, 2010; 978-4-04-868452-1	April 21, 2015; 978-0-316-29643-4
Prologue; Chapters 5-9
After foiling the ambush from the Salamanders, Kirito and Leafa continue to head towards the World Tree but end up in the underworld, Jötunheimr. After a series of experiences to both of the gamers, they soon arrive at the base of the World Tree, Arun. Kirito immediately tries to fly into the World Tree and save Asuna. However, before he saves her, he is faced with a few surprising findings.
5	Sword Art Online 5: Phantom Bullet; Fantomu Baretto (ファントム・バレット)	August 10, 2010; 978-4-04-868763-8	August 18, 2015; 978-0-316-29644-1
Prologue; Chapters 1-7
After saving his girlfriend, Kirito changes game: Following the request of Kikuoka, an officer from the Internal Defense Department he dives into a game filled with gunpowder and firearms. With the help of Sinon, a sniper, he investigates a series of murders committed by the mysterious Death Gun.
6	Sword Art Online 6: Phantom Bullet; Fantomu Baretto (ファントム・バレット)	December 10, 2010; 978-4-04-870132-7	December 15, 2015; 978-0-316-29645-8
Chapters 7-16
Kirito enters in the middle of the action by participating in the Bullet Of Bullets PVP battle. In meantime he deduces that the opponent is a member of the old Sword Art Online game's red (killer) guild, Laughing Coffin.
7	Sword Art Online 7: Mother's Rosary; Mazāzu Rozario (マザーズ・ロザリオ)	April 8, 2011; 978-4-04-870431-1	April 19, 2016; 978-0-316-39040-8
Prologue; Chapters 1-12
A spin-off focusing on Kirito's girlfriend Asuna and "Absolute Sword" Konno Yuuki.
8	Sword Art Online 8: Early and Late; Ārī ando Reito (アーリー・アンド・レイト)	August 10, 2011; 978-4-04-870733-6	August 30, 2016; 978-0-316-39041-5
"A Crime Within the Walls" (圏内事件, Kennai Jiken); "Calibur" (キャリバー, Kyariba); "The First Day" (はじまりの日, Hajimari no Hi)
Short stories from the world of Sword Art Online and Alfheim Online.
9	Sword Art Online 9: Alicization Beginning; Arishizēshon Biginingu (アリシゼーション・ビギニング)	February 10, 2012; 978-4-04-886271-4	December 13, 2016; 978-0-316-39042-2
"Prologue I" (プロローグ I, Purorōgu I); "Prologue II" (プロローグ II, Purorōgu II); "Interlude I" (転章I, Ten Shyou I); Chapter 1. "Underworld" (アンダーワールド, Andawarudo)
Kirito wakes up in the middle of a forest with no memories of how he came here. He deduces that he might have dived into none other than Underworld, a virtual world he had dived as part of his part time job but with the memories of his diving blocked by his employer and is supposedly very realistic that matches even the real world. While exploring the forest, he stumbled upon a boy named Eugeo, who is carrying out his job of cutting down a giant tree. The chance meeting between the two marks the beginning of Kirito's adventure into this mysterious world.
10	Sword Art Online 10: Alicization Running; Arishizēshon Ran'ningu (アリシゼーション・ランニング)	July 10, 2012; 978-4-04-886697-2	April 18, 2017; 978-0-316-39043-9
Chapter 2. "Project Alicization" (アリシゼーション計画, Arishizeshon Keikaku); Chapter 3. "Zakkaria Sword Arts Tournament" (ザッカリア剣術大会, Zakkaria Kenjutsu Taikai); Chapter 4. "Sword Mastery Academy" (帝立修剣学院, Teiritsu Syuuken Gakuin); "Interlude II" (転章II, Ten Shyou II)
11	Sword Art Online 11: Alicization Turning; Arishizēshon Tāningu (アリシゼーション・ターニング)	December 10, 2012; 978-4-04-891157-3	August 22, 2017; 978-0-316-39044-6
Chapter 5. "Seal of the Right Eye" (右眼の封印, Migime no Huuin); "Interlude III" (転章III, Ten Shyou III); Chapter 6. "The Prisoners and Knight" (囚人と騎士, Meshiudo to Kishi)
12	Sword Art Online 12: Alicization Rising; Arishizēshon Raijingu (アリシゼーション・ライジング)	April 10, 2013; 978-4-04-891529-8	December 12, 2017; 978-0-316-39045-3
Chapter 7. "The Two Supervisors" (二人の管理者, Futari no Kanrisha); Chapter 8. "Central Cathedral" (セントラル・カセドラル, Sentoraru Kasedoraru)
13	Sword Art Online 13: Alicization Dividing; Arishizēshon Dibaidingu (アリシゼーション・ディバイディング)	August 10, 2013; 978-4-04-891757-5	April 24, 2018; 978-0-316-39046-0
"Interlude IV" (転章IV, Ten Shyou IV); Chapter 9. "Integrity Knight Alice" (整合騎士アリス, Seigou Kishi Arisu); Chapter 10. "Integrity Knight Commander Bercouli" (整合騎士長ベルクーリ, Seigou Kishicho Berukuri); Chapter 11. "The Secret of the Chamber of Elders" (元老院の秘密, Genrouin no Himitsu)
14	Sword Art Online 14: Alicization Uniting; Arishizēshon Yunaitingu (アリシゼーション・ユナイティング)	April 10, 2014; 978-4-04-866505-6	August 21, 2018; 978-0-316-56106-8
Chapter 12. "Highest Minister Administrator" (最高司祭アドミニストレータ, Saikou Shisai Adominisutorēta); Chapter 13. "The Decisive Battle" (決戦, Kessen)
15	Sword Art Online 15: Alicization Invading; Arishizēshon Inbēdingu (アリシゼーション・インベーディング)	August 9, 2014; 978-4-04-866775-3	December 18, 2018; 978-0-316-39049-1
Chapter 14. "Subtilizer" (魂を盗む者(サトライザー), Satoraizā); Chapter 15. "In the Northern Territory" (北の地にて, Kita no Chi Nite); Chapter 16. "Attack on Ocean Turtle" (オーシャン・タートル襲撃, Ōshan Tātoru Shūgeki); Chapter 17. "Dark Territory" (ダークテリトリー, Dāku Teritorī)
After the decisive battle against the Highest Minister Administrator the Human Empire's defences are shaken. However the Great East Gate is on the verge of crumbling. The Order of the Integrity Knights needs to prepare against the incoming army from the Dark Territory once the gate crumbles.
16	Sword Art Online 16: Alicization Exploding; Arishizēshon Ekusupurōdingu (アリシゼーション・エクスプローディング)	August 8, 2015; 978-4-04-865307-7	May 21, 2019; 978-1-9753-0418-8
Chapter 18. "War of the Underworld" (アンダーワールド大戦, Andāwārudo Taisen); Chapter 19. "The Radiant Medium" (光の巫女, Hikari no Miko)
17	Sword Art Online 17: Alicization Awakening; Arishizēshon Aueikingu (アリシゼーション・アウェイクニング)	April 10, 2016; 978-4-04-865883-6	October 29, 2019; 978-1-9753-5697-2
Chapter 20. "Each Own Battle" (それぞれの戦い, Sore Zore no Tatakai); Chapter 21. "Awakening" (覚醒, Kakusei)
18	Sword Art Online 18: Alicization Lasting; Arishizēshon Rasutingu (アリシゼーション・ラスティング)	August 10, 2016; 978-4-04-892250-0	January 7, 2020; 978-1-9753-5699-6
Chapter 21. "Awakening (Cont.)" (覚醒(承前), Kakusei (Shouzen)); Chapter 22. "The Decisive Battle" (決戦, Kessen); Chapter 23. "Return" (帰還, Kikan); "Epilogue" (エピローグ, Epirōgu); "Prologue III" (プロローグ III, Purorōgu III)
19	Sword Art Online 19: Moon Cradle; Mūn Kureidoru (ムーン・クレイドル)	February 10, 2017; 978-4-04-892668-3	April 21, 2020; 978-1-9753-5701-6
Chapters 1-10
20	Sword Art Online 20: Moon Cradle; Mūn Kureidoru (ムーン・クレイドル)	September 8, 2017; 978-4-04-893283-7	August 18, 2020; 978-1-9753-5703-0
Chapters 1-10
21	Sword Art Online 21: Unital Ring I Yunaitaru Ringu I (ユナイタル・リングⅠ)	December 7, 2018; 978-4-04-912211-4	January 19, 2021; 978-1-9753-1595-5
Prologue; Chapters 1-9
22	Sword Art Online 22: Kiss and Fly; Kisu ando Furai (キス・アンド・フライ)	October 10, 2019; 978-4-04-912675-4	June 22, 2021; 978-1-9753-2174-1
"The Day Before" (ザ・デイ・ビフォア, Za Dei Bifoa); "The Day After" (ザ・デイ・アフター, Za Dei Afutā); "Rainbow Bridge" (虹の橋, Niji no Hashi); "Sisters' Prayer"
23	Sword Art Online 23: Unital Ring II; Yunaitaru Ringu II (ユナイタル・リングII)	December 10, 2019; 978-4-04-912891-8	November 9, 2021; 978-1-9753-2176-5
Chapters 1-10
24	Sword Art Online 24: Unital Ring III; Yunaitaru Ringu III (ユナイタル・リングⅢ)	May 9, 2020; 978-4-04-913155-0	May 3, 2022; 978-1-9753-2178-9
Chapters 1-10
25	Sword Art Online 25: Unital Ring IV; Yunaitaru Ringu IV (ユナイタル・リングIV)	December 10, 2020; 978-4-04-913531-2	September 20, 2022; 978-1-9753-4340-8
Chapters 1-11
26	Sword Art Online 26: Unital Ring V Yunaitaru Ringu V (ユナイタル・リングⅤ)	October 8, 2021; 978-4-04-914035-4	March 21, 2023; 978-1-9753-4896-0
Chapters 1-23
27	Sword Art Online 27: Unital Ring VI; Yunaitaru Ringu VI (ユナイタル・リングⅥ)	October 7, 2022; 978-4-04-914622-6	August 22, 2023; 978-1-9753-6977-4
Chapters 1-15
28	Sword Art Online 28: Unital Ring VII; Yunaitaru Ringu VII (ユナイタル・リングⅦ)	June 7, 2024; 978-4-04-915556-3	July 8, 2025; 979-8-8554-1554-4
Chapters 1-12
29	Sword Art Online 29: Unital Ring VIII; Yunaitaru Ringu VIII (ユナイタル・リングⅧ)	April 10, 2026; 978-4-04-916930-0	—

=== Sword Art Online: Progressive ===
No.	Title	Original release date	English release date
1	Sword Art Online: Progressive 1	October 10, 2012; 978-4-04-886977-5	March 24, 2015; 978-0-316-25936-1
"Aria on a Starless Night" (星なき夜のアリア, Hoshi Naki Yoru no Aria); "Interlude - The Reason For The Whiskers" (幕間 - ヒゲの理由, Makuai - Hige no Riyū); "Rondo for a Fragile Blade" (儚き剣のロンド, Hakanaki Ken no Rondo)
2	Sword Art Online: Progressive 2	December 10, 2013; 978-4-04-866163-8	June 30, 2015; 978-0-316-34217-9
"Concerto of Black and White" (黒白のコンチェルト, Kokubyaku no Koncheruto)
3	Sword Art Online: Progressive 3	December 10, 2014; 978-4-04-869096-6	October 27, 2015; 978-0-316-34883-6
"Barcarolle of Froth" (泡影のバルカローレ, Hōei no Barukarōre)
4	Sword Art Online: Progressive 4	December 10, 2015; 978-4-04-865566-8	October 25, 2016; 978-0-316-54542-6
"Scherzo of Deep Night" (冥き夕闇のスケルツォ, Kuraki Yūyami no Sukerutso)
5	Sword Art Online: Progressive 5	February 10, 2018; 978-4-04-893613-2	November 13, 2018; 978-1-9753-2814-6
"Canon of the Golden Rule (Start)" (黄金律のカノン（上）, Kogane Ritsu no Kanon (Ue))
6	Sword Art Online: Progressive 6	May 10, 2018; 978-4-04-893797-9	July 9, 2019; 978-1-9753-8333-6
"Canon of the Golden Rule (End)" (黄金律のカノン（下）, Kogane Ritsu no Kanon (Shita))
7	Sword Art Online: Progressive 7	March 10, 2021; 978-4-04-913677-7	January 18, 2022; 978-1-9753-3991-3
"Rhapsody of Crimson Heat (Part One)" (赤き焦熱のラプソディ（上）, Akaki Shōnetsu no Rapusodi (Ue))
8	Sword Art Online: Progressive 8	June 10, 2021; 978-4-04-913830-6	June 7, 2022; 978-1-9753-4338-5
"Rhapsody of Crimson Heat (Part Two)" (赤き焦熱のラプソディ（下）, Akaki Shōnetsu no Rapusodi (Shita))
9	Sword Art Online: Progressive 9	March 7, 2025; 978-4-04-916182-3	May 12, 2026; 979-8-8554-2789-9
"Nocturne of the Blue Reflected Moon (Part One)" (青き水月のノクターン（上）, Aoki Suigetsu no Nokutān (Ue))
10	Sword Art Online: Progressive 10	November 10, 2026; 978-4-04-952301-0	—

=== Sword Art Online Alternative Gun Gale Online ===
No.	Title	Original release date	English release date
1	Sword Art Online Alternative Gun Gale Online I: Squad Jam —Sukuwaddo Jamu— (—スクワッド・ジャム—)	December 10, 2014; 978-4-04-869094-2	June 26, 2018; 978-1-9753-2752-1
2	Sword Art Online Alternative Gun Gale Online II: 2nd Squad Jam: Start —Sekando Sukuwaddo Jamu ＜Jou＞— (—セカンド・スクワッド・ジャム ＜上＞—)	March 10, 2015; 978-4-04-869095-9	September 18, 2018; 978-1-9753-5384-1
3	Sword Art Online Alternative Gun Gale Online III: 2nd Squad Jam: Finish —Sekando Sukuwaddo Jamu ＜Ge＞— (—セカンド・スクワッド・ジャム ＜下＞—)	June 10, 2015; 978-4-04-865190-5	February 19, 2019; 978-1-9753-5385-8
4	Sword Art Online Alternative Gun Gale Online IV: 3rd Squad Jam: Betrayers' Choice —Sādo Sukuwaddo Jamu Bitoreiyāzu Choisu ＜Jou＞— (—サード・スクワッド・ジャム ビトレイヤーズ・チョイス〈上〉—)	March 10, 2016; 978-4-04-865818-8	July 30, 2019; 978-1-9753-5386-5
5	Sword Art Online Alternative Gun Gale Online V: 3rd Squad Jam: Betrayers' Choice: Finish —Sādo Sukuwaddo Jamu Bitoreiyāzu Choisu ＜Ge＞— (—サード・スクワッド・ジャム ビトレイヤーズ・チョイス〈下〉—)	July 9, 2016; 978-4-04-892110-7	December 12, 2019; 978-1-9753-5387-2
6	Sword Art Online Alternative Gun Gale Online VI: One Summer Day —Wan Samā Dei— (—ワン・サマー・デイ—)	March 10, 2017; 978-4-04-892745-1	February 25, 2020; 978-1-9753-5388-9
7	Sword Art Online Alternative Gun Gale Online VII: 4th Squad Jam: Start —Fōsu Sukuwaddo Jamu ＜Jou＞— (—フォース・スクワッド・ジャム〈上〉—)	June 9, 2018; 978-4-04-893789-4	November 24, 2020; 978-1-9753-1532-0
8	Sword Art Online Alternative Gun Gale Online VIII: 4th Squad Jam: Continue —Fōsu Sukuwaddo Jamu ＜Chū＞— (—フォース・スクワッド・ジャム〈中〉—)	August 10, 2018; 978-4-04-893878-5	March 2, 2021; 978-1-9753-1597-9
9	Sword Art Online Alternative Gun Gale Online IX: 4th Squad Jam: Finish —Fōsu Sukuwaddo Jamu ＜Ge＞— (—フォース・スクワッド・ジャム〈下〉—)	December 7, 2018; 978-4-04-912093-6	June 22, 2021; 978-1-9753-1599-3
10	Sword Art Online Alternative Gun Gale Online X: Five Ordeals —Faibu Ōdīruzu— (—ファイブ・オーディールズ—)	April 10, 2020; 978-4-04-913132-1	November 9, 2021; 978-1-9753-2180-2
11	Sword Art Online Alternative Gun Gale Online XI: 5th Squad Jam: Start —Fifusu Sukuwaddo Jamu ＜Jou＞— (—フィフス・スクワッド・ジャム〈上〉—)	November 10, 2021; 978-4-04-913940-2	November 22, 2022; 978-1-9753-4856-4
12	Sword Art Online Alternative Gun Gale Online XII: 5th Squad Jam: Continue —Fifusu Sukuwaddo Jamu ＜Chū＞— (—フィフス・スクワッド・ジャム〈中〉—)	February 10, 2022; 978-4-04-914142-9	June 20, 2023; 978-1-9753-6786-2
13	Sword Art Online Alternative Gun Gale Online XIII: 5th Squad Jam: Finish —Fifusu Sukuwaddo Jamu ＜Ge＞— (—フィフス・スクワッド・ジャム〈下〉—)	March 10, 2023; 978-4-04-914143-6	November 21, 2023; 978-1-9753-7523-2
14	Sword Art Online Alternative Gun Gale Online XIV: Invitation from Vivi —Inbitēshon furomu Bībī— (—インビテーション・フロム・ビービー—)	October 10, 2024; 978-4-04-915907-3	November 11, 2025; 979-8-8554-2093-7

=== Sword Art Online Alternative Clover's Regret ===
No.	Title	Original release date	English release date
1	Sword Art Online Alternative Clover's Regret	November 10, 2016; 978-4-04-892487-0	August 20, 2024; 978-1-9753-9068-6
2	Sword Art Online Alternative Clover's Regret 2	January 10, 2018; 978-4-04-893594-4	December 10, 2024; 978-1-9753-9070-9
3	Sword Art Online Alternative Clover's Regret 3	August 10, 2018; 978-4-04-893971-3	April 15, 2025; 978-1-9753-9072-3

=== Sword Art Online IF Official Novel Anthology ===
No.	Title	Japanese release date	Japanese ISBN
1	Sword Art Online IF Official Novel Anthology	November 10, 2023	978-4-04-915348-4

=== Sword Art Online Alternative Gourmet Seekers ===
No.	Title	Japanese release date	Japanese ISBN
1	Sword Art Online Alternative Gourmet Seekers	November 17, 2023	978-4-04-915210-4
2	Sword Art Online Alternative Gourmet Seekers 2	October 17, 2024	978-4-04-915828-1

=== Sword Art Online Alternative Mystery Labyrinth ===
No.	Title	Japanese release date	Japanese ISBN
1	Sword Art Online Alternative Mystery Labyrinth: Murder in the Labyrinth Pavilion; Meikyū-kan no Satsujin (迷宮館の殺人)	December 8, 2023	978-4-04-915278-4

=== Sword Art Online Alternative Gambler's Honor ===
No.	Title	Japanese release date	Japanese ISBN
1	Sword Art Online Alternative Gambler's Honor	May 9, 2026	978-4-04-915275-3

=== Sword Art Online: Material ===
No.	Title	Japanese release date	Japanese ISBN
1	Sword Art Online: Material 1: Sugary Days; Shugārī Deizu (シュガーリィ・デイズ)	August 7, 2026	978-4-04-952437-6

=== Sword Art Online Material Edition ===
No.	Title	Japanese release date	Japanese ISBN
1	Sword Art Online: Extra Story "The Progressers" (Note: Republished as part of Material Edition: The Assemblage (2011) and Material Edition: Remix (2019)); Sōdo Āto Onrain: Ekusutora Sutōrī "Kōryakushatachi" (ソードアートオンライン：エクストラストーリー「攻略者たち」)	November 18, 2007	—
2	Early Characters; Ārī Kyarakutāzu (アーリーキャラクターズ)	February 10, 2008	—
3	Ceramic Heart; Seramikku Hāto (セラミックハート)	May 5, 2008	—
4	Cold Hand, Warm Heart; Kōrudo Hando Wōmu Hāto (コールドハンド・ウォームハート)	November 16, 2008	—
5	Salvia; Sarubia (サルビア)	May 5, 2009	—
6	Algade Showdown; Arugēdo no Kettou (アルゲードの決斗)	November 15, 2009	—
7	Continuation: Aria on a Starless Night (Note: Republished as part of Progressive Volume 1); Zoku Hoshi-naki Yoru no Aria (続・星なき夜のアリア)	August 21, 2011	—
8	Rondo for a Fragile Blade (First Chapter); Hakanaki Ken no Rondo Daiisshō (儚き剣のロンド 第一章)	October 30, 2011	—
9	Concerto of Black & White (First Chapter) (Note: Republished as part of Progressive Volume 2); Kokubyaku no Koncheruto Daiisshō (黒白のコンチェルト 第一章)	February 5, 2012	—
10	Sword Art Online 16.6 (Note: Later published as "Sugary Days 1" in Sugary Days (2015) and Sugary Days (2018))	October 20, 2013	—
11	Sword Art Online 16.7 (Note: Later published as "Sugary Days 2" in Sugary Days (2015) and Sugary Days (2018))	February 2, 2014	—
12	Sword Art Online 16.8 (Note: Later published as "Sugary Days 3" in Sugary Days (2015) and Sugary Days (2018))	May 5, 2014	—
13	Sword Art Online 16.9 (Note: Later published as "Sugary Days 4" in Sugary Days (2015) and Sugary Days (2018))	August 31, 2014	—
14	Sugary Days 5 (Note: Republished as part of "Sugary Days" (2015) and Sugary Days (2018))	November 23, 2014	—
15	Sugary Days 6 (Note: Republished as part of Sugary Days (2018))	May 5, 2015	—
16	Sugary Days 7	August 30, 2015	—
17	The Much-Talked-About Esteemed Sub-leader (Note: Republished as part of Material Edition: Remix (2019)); Uwasa no Fuku Danchō-sama (うわさの副団長さま)	November 15, 2015	—
18	Sugary Days 8	January 31, 2016	—
19	Sugary Days 9	May 5, 2016	—
20	Monochromatic Colors; Monokuromatikku Karāzu (モノクロマティック・カラーズ)	August 21, 2016	—
21	SAOP4.2	October 23, 2016	—
22	Augmented Magic (Note: Republished as part of Sword Art Online Volume 21: Unital Ring I); Ōgumenteddo Majikku (オーグメンテッドマジック)	February 12, 2017	—
23	Sugary Days 10	May 6, 2017	—
24	Sugary Days 11	August 20, 2017	—
25	Sugary Days 12	November 23, 2017	—
26	Sugary Days 13	February 11, 2018	—
27	Sugary Days 14	May 5, 2018	—
28	Sword Art Online Extra Story X3: "32/33" (Note: Republished as part of "If You Were Here"); Sōdo Āto Onrain Gaiden X3 "32/33" (ソードアート・オンライン外伝X3 『32/33』)	February 17, 2019	—
29	Sword Art Online Extra Story X3: "32/33" (2); Sōdo Āto Onrain Gaiden X3 "32/33" ② (ソードアート・オンライン外伝X3 『32/33』②)	May 12, 2019	—

=== Sword Art Online Material Edition collections ===
No.	Title	Japanese release date	Japanese ISBN
–	Sword Art Online Material Edition: The Assemblage; Sōdo Āto Onrain Materiaru Edishon Sōshūhen (ソードアート・オンライン マテリアル・エディション総集編)	February 13, 2011	—
Includes the first six Material Editions, the "what if" short story "There is But One Ultimate Way", and the first four Word Gear Press event papers sold at previous events, as well as art from the author's website.
–	Sword Art Online: Sugary Days; Sōdo Āto Onrain Shugāryi Deizu (ソードアート・オンライン シュガーリィ・デイズ)	August 9, 2018	—
Released at Comitia 125. Includes the complete Sugary Days storyline, originally released in Material Editions 10-16, 18-19, and 23-27, along with a newly written epilogue.
–	Sword Art Online Material Edition: Remix; Sōdo Āto Onrain Materiaru Edishon: Remikkusu (ソードアート・オンライン マテリアル・エディション：リミックス)	September 6, 2019	—
Originally released at the Sword Art Online Ex-Chronicle event, held on August 4–18, 2019. The manga Material Editions were redrawn by the Phantom Bullet and Project Alicization manga artist Kōtarō Yamada. Includes Material Editions 1-6, 17 and 20; also includes "Sound of Water, Sound of Hammer", "The Fourteenth Autumn" and "A Spot of Sunshine in the Winter" from the character edition books.

=== Sword Art Online short stories ===
No.	Title	Japanese release date	Japanese ISBN
–	Versus (Note: Republished as part of Accel World Volume 10: Elements); Bāsasu (バーサス)	April 10, 2010	—
Released as part of the «All-in-1-Book: Accel World & Sword Art Online» attachment to volume 13 of Dengeki Bunko Magazine. Later included in Accel World light novel volume 10 on December 10, 2011. Crossover with Accel World.
–	Sword Art Online Extra Story X2: There is But One Ultimate Way (Note: Republished as part of Material Edition: The Assemblage (2011)); Sōdo Āto Onrain Gaiden X2 Tatta Hitotsu no Kyūkyoku-teki na Yarikata (ソードアート オンライン 外伝X2 たったひとつの究極的なやりかた)	May 4, 2010	—
Originally released at Comitia 92. Re-released in Sword Art Online Material Edition: Assemblage on February 13, 2011.
–	Calibur SS; Kyaribā Sukoshi Shippai han (キャリバー SS(すこししっぱい)版)	June 10, 2011	—
Released in Dengeki Bunko Magazine volume 20.
–	Lisbeth Edition	May 5, 2012	—
"Sound of Water, Sound of Hammer" (水音、槌音, Mizuoto, tsuchioto); "Extraordinary Ordinary Days" (非日常という日常, Hi nichijō to iu nichijō)
Released at Comitia 100.
–	Breaking the Damage Limit; Damēji no Genkai Toppa (ダメージの限界突破)	October 2012	—
Released as a story trading card at Dengeki Bunko Trounce! Breaking Limits Fair.
–	The Day Before (Note: Republished as part of Sword Art Online Volume 22: Kiss and Fly); Za Dei Bifoa (ザ・デイ・ビフォア)	October 24, 2012	—
Included in the Japanese Sword Art Online anime Blu-ray/DVD volume 1 limited edition.
–	Silica Edition	November 18, 2012	—
"A Spot of Sunshine in the Winter" (冬の陽だまり, Fuyu no Hidamari); "The Final Promise" (最後の約束, Saigo no Yakusoku)
Released at Comitia 102.
–	Open-Air Bath; Rotenburo (露天風呂)	February 9, 2013	—
Released in a "story pencil board" attachment to volume 30 of Dengeki Bunko Magazine. On September 28, 2020, the story was re-released via the Kawahara Reki Channel on Niconico as the first entry of the channel's subscribers-only vintage side story lineup.
–	Celeste Fairy; Cheresute no Yōsei (チェレステの妖精)	April 10, 2013	—
Released as part of the «All-in-1-Book: Accel World & Sword Art Online» attachment to volume 31 of Dengeki Bunko Magazine.
–	Pina Edition	May 5, 2013	—
"The Fourteenth Autumn" (十四回目の秋, Jū Yon Kai Me no Aki); "Pina Edition Bonus Manga Theatre" (ピナ・エディ・おまけ・まんが劇場, Pina Edi Omake Manga Gekijō)
Released at Comitia 104.
–	The Day After; Za Dei Afutā (ザ・デイ・アフター)	June 26, 2013	—
Included in the Japanese Sword Art Online anime Blu-ray/DVD volume 9 limited edition.
–	Rainbow Bridge; Niji no Hashi (虹の橋)	April 23, 2014	—
Included in the Japanese Sword Art Online: Extra Edition anime Blu-ray/DVD limited edition.
–	Dream Game -Crossover- Dorīmu Gēmu —Kurosuoba— (ドリーム・ゲーム —くろすおーばー—)	August 9, 2014	—
Released via Dengeki Bunko Magazine. First part of the crossover witch The Irregular at Magic High School. Written by Tsutomu Satō.
–	16.8.5	August 10, 2014	—
Released as part of a file that was given to buyers of volume 15 from select retailers as part of Dengeki Fighting Fair.
–	Versus II; Bāsasu II (バーサスII)	October 10, 2014	—
Released in Dengeki Bunko Magazine volume 41. Second part of the crossover with The Irregular at Magic High School.
–	Objectors! ～VRMMO Development Tragedy～ Obujekutāzu！ ～VRMMO Kaihatsu Hiwa～ (Objectors!(オブジェクターズ！) ～VRMMO開発悲話～)	December 10, 2014	—
Initially released on the author's personal website under the title "VRMMO Development Tragedy". Re-released in the volume 41 of Dengeki Bunko Magazine with an added epilogue.
–	Sugary Days; Shugāryi Deizu (シュガーリィ・デイズ)	May 25, 2015	—
Included in the Japanese Sword Art Online II anime Blu-ray/DVD volume 5 limited edition. A compilation of Material Editions released in 2013 and 2014 (Sugary Days 1-5) with additions and fixes.
–	Sisters' Prayer	June 24, 2015	—
Included in the Japanese Sword Art Online II anime Blu-ray/DVD volume 9 limited edition.
–	chromatic colors Kuromatikku Karāzu (クロマティック・カラーズ)	January 20, 2016	—
Released as part of Sword Art Online abec Art Works, the first art book by abec. An English translation of the art book with the story was released on November 28, 2017 by Yen Press.
–	SAOP4.1 (Note: Republished as part of Progressive Volume 5)	August 2016	—
Released for the Dengeki Bunko Choukansha Fair 2016.
–	Hopeful Chant; Hōpufuru Chanto (ホープフル・チャント)	March 4, 2017	—
Released as a free bonus to those who came to see Sword Art Online: Ordinal Scale in Japan in the third week of the official cinema release between March 4 and March 10, 2017.
–	Agil and Klein's Exciting Meal; Egiru to Kurain no Wakuwaku Gohan (エギルとクラインのわくわくご飯)	August 1, 2017	—
Released for the Dengeki Bunko Choukansha Fair 2017.
–	Cordial Chords; Kōdiaru Kōdo (コーディアル・コード)	September 27, 2017	—
Included in the Japanese Sword Art Online: Ordinal Scale anime Blu-ray/DVD limited edition.
–	Salvia and the MTB; Sarubia to MTB (サルビアとMTB)	June 9, 2018	—
Updated republication of Material Edition 5 "Salvia" as part of Dengeki Bunko Magazine volume 62.
–	The End of the Summer and the Straw Hat; Natsunoowari to Mugiwara Bōshi (夏の終わりと麦藁帽子)	August 2018	—
Released for the Dengeki Bunko Choukansha Fair 2018.
–	Sword Art Online Alternative Gun Gale Online: How LLENN stopped fretting and had her fire for combat sparked by Pitohui; Sōdo Āto Onrain Orutanatibu Gangeiru Onrain —Ren wa ikaga ni nayamu no o yame, pitofūi ni tōshiwomoyasu-yō ni natta ka— (ソードアート・オンライン オルタナティブ ガンゲイル・オンライン —レンは如何に悩むのをやめ、ピトフーイに闘志を燃やすようになったか—)	November 28, 2018	—
Included in the Japanese Sword Art Online Alternative Gun Gale Online anime Blu-ray/DVD volume 6 limited edition.
–	Distant Journey; Disutanto Jānī (ディスタント・ジャーニー)	January 30, 2019	—
Included in the Japanese Sword Art Online: Alicization anime Blu-ray/DVD volume 1 limited edition.
–	Sword Art Online Alternative Gun Gale Online: Her step, step (Note: Republished as part of Sword Art Online Alternative Gun Gale Online Volume 10: Five Ordeals); Sōdo Āto Onrain Orutanatibu Gangeiru Onrain Kanojo no Suteppu Suteppu (ソードアート・オンライン オルタナティブ ガンゲイル・オンライン 彼女のステップ・ステップ)	June 26, 2019	—
Included in the single "Prologue" by Elza Kanzaki (CV: Reona) limited edition.
–	Summer Memories; Natsunoomoide (夏の思い出)	August 2019	—
First part released for the Dengeki Bunko Choukansha Fair 2019, the second on Kawahara's website.
–	If You Were Here	August 28, 2019	—
Included in the Japanese Sword Art Online: Alicization anime Blu-ray/DVD volume 8 limited edition. A compilation of Material Editions released in 2019 (Extra Story X3: "32/33" 1 and 2) with additions and fixes.
–	If You Wish It	January 29, 2020	—
Included in the Japanese Sword Art Online: Alicization – War of Underworld anime Blu-ray/DVD volume 2 limited edition. A sequel to "If You Were Here".
–	prismatic colors Purizumatikku Karāzu (プリズマティック・カラーズ)	March 27, 2020	—
Released as part of Sword Art Online abec Art Works Wanderers, the second art book by abec. An English translation of the art book with the story was released on June 21, 2022 by Yen Press.
–	If We Could Walk Together	December 9, 2020	—
Included in the Japanese Sword Art Online: Alicization – War of Underworld anime Blu-ray/DVD volume 8 limited edition. A sequel to "If You Wish It".
–	Bluish Memories; Burūisshu Memorī (ブルーイッシュ・メモリー)	August 6, 2021	—
Released for the Dengeki Bunko Choukansha Fair 2021.
–	Sword Art Online Progressive: The Next Day; Sōdo Āto Onrain Puroguresshibu Sono Tsugunohi (ソードアート・オンライン プログレッシブ その次の日)	November 13, 2021	—
Distributed with the Sword Art Online Progressive: Aria of a Starless Night movie as a third week screening bonus. Sequel to "The First Day".
–	Sword Art Online: Memorable Song; Sōdo Āto Onrain Memoraburu Songu (ソードアート・オンライン メモラブル・ソング)	July 8, 2022	—
Included in the Japanese Sword Art Online Progressive: Aria of a Starless Night anime Blu-ray/DVD limited edition.
–	Sword Art Online: 7th Floor Once More; Sōdo Āto Onrain Nana-sō Futatabi (ソードアート・オンライン 七層ふたたび)	August 5, 2022	—
Released for the Dengeki Bunko Choukansha Fair 2022.
–	Sword Art Online Progressive: The Seventh Day; Sōdo Āto Onrain Puroguresshibu Nanukame (ソードアート・オンライン プログレッシブ 七日目)	November 5, 2022	—
Distributed with the Sword Art Online Progressive: Scherzo of Deep Night movie as a third week screening bonus.
–	Sword Art Online Progressive: Curable Pain; Sōdo Āto Onrain Puroguresshibu Kyuaraburu Pein (ソードアート・オンライン プログレッシブ キュアラブル・ペイン)	May 25, 2023	—
Included in the Japanese Sword Art Online Progressive: Scherzo of Deep Night anime Blu-ray/DVD limited edition.
–	Sword Art Online Progressive: 7th Floor, for the Third Time; Sōdo Āto Onrain Puroguresshibu Nana-sō mi Tabi (ソードアート・オンライン プログレッシブ 七層みたび)	August 4, 2023	—
Released for the Dengeki Bunko Choukansha Fair 2023.
–	Sword Art Online Alternative Gun Gale Online: The Mountain Rabbit Never Sleeps ~I shouldn't have paid him any attention~ Sōdo Āto Onrain Orutanatibu Gangeiru Onrain Santo wa Nemuranai ~Aite ni suru n janakatta~ (ソードアート・オンライン オルタナティブ ガンゲイル・オンライン 山兎は眠らない ～相手にするんじゃなかった～)	January 29, 2025	—
Included in the Japanese Sword Art Online Alternative Gun Gale Online II anime Blu-ray/DVD volume 2 limited edition.
–	Sword Art Online: Summer Homework Never Ends; Sōdo Āto Onrain Samāwāku ga Owaranai (ソードアート・オンライン サマーワークが終わらない)	August 1, 2025	—
Released for the Dengeki Bunko Choukansha Fair 2025.
