= Sword Art Online Progressive: Aria of a Starless Night =

Sword Art Online: Progressive – Aria of a Starless Night
- Theatrical release poster

Japanese name
- Kanji: 劇場版 ソードアート・オンライン -プログレッシブ- 星なき夜のアリア
Transcriptions
- Revised Hepburn: Gekijōban Sōdo Āto Onrain Puroguresshibu Hoshi Naki Yoru no Aria
- Directed by: Ayako Kōno
- Screenplay by: Yukito Kizawa
- Story by: Reki Kawahara
- Based on: Sword Art Online: Progressive by Reki Kawahara
- Produced by: Shintarou Kawakami; Kaoru Adachi; Yousuke Futami; Keisuke Hirai; Masami Niwa
- Starring: Yoshitsugu Matsuoka; Haruka Tomatsu; Inori Minase
- Cinematography: Yuki Ōshima
- Edited by: Kiyoshi Hirose
- Music by: Yuki Kajiura
- Production company: A-1 Pictures
- Distributed by: Aniplex
- Release date: October 30, 2021
- Running time: 97 minutes
- Country: Japan
- Language: Japanese
- Box office: US$14.03 million

Sword Art Online: Progressive – Aria of a Starless Night (Note: Japanese: 劇場版 ソードアート・オンライン -プログレッシブ- 星なき夜のアリア, Hepburn: Gekijōban Sōdo Āto Onrain Puroguresshibu Hoshi-naki Yoru no Aria; also known as Sword Art Online: Progressive the Movie – Hoshi Naki Yoru no Aria or Sword Art Online the Movie -Progressive- Aria of a Starless Night) is a 2021 Japanese animated science fiction action adventure film based on the Sword Art Online: Progressive light novels written by Reki Kawahara and illustrated by abec, which serve as an expanded retelling of Sword Art Online's Aincrad storyline. The film is produced by A-1 Pictures and directed by Ayako Kōno, while featuring character designs by Kento Toya and music by Yuki Kajiura. This is the second film, after Sword Art Online the Movie: Ordinal Scale, of the Sword Art Online anime series. The film depicts the story of Asuna's initial struggle to cope with being trapped in Sword Art Online along with her friend Mito, the first encounter between her and Kirito, and general in-depth coverage of events that occurred on Aincrad's first floor that were either skimmed over or skipped entirely in the original series. The film premiered in Japan on October 30, 2021.

A sequel film titled Sword Art Online Progressive: Scherzo of Deep Night, which mainly focuses on events on the fifth floor, premiered in Japan on October 22, 2022.

== Plot ==
In 2022, Akihiko Kayaba creates a virtual reality massively multiplayer online role-playing game (VRMMORPG) named Sword Art Online (SAO). As depicted in the first volume of the Sword Art Online: Progressive light novel series, the NerveGear is a 2nd generation FullDive device developed by a company named Argus, with Kayaba as its creator. It has a single interface that covers the player's entire head. It controls the player's consciousness by redirecting the brain's signals to the NerveGear, such that they can experience and control their in-game characters with their minds without any physical movement. It has its own battery source, as well as a high-frequency electromagnetic microwave transmitter.

On November 6, 2022, 10,000 players log into SAO for the first time, only to discover that they are unable to log out of the game. Kayaba reveals himself to tell the players that they must beat all 100 floors of Aincrad, the enormous steel castle that is the setting of SAO if they want to escape the game. Only then would they be able to log out. Dying inside of the game or having their NerveGear forcibly removed from their head will cause them to have their brains destroyed by the NerveGear, thus killing them in real life as well.

Asuna, who had logged into the game to play with her school friend Misumi Tozawa, or Mito within the game, initially struggles to cope with her new reality of being trapped inside the game. Having been an original beta tester, Mito uses her previous experience to help Asuna level up quickly by killing monsters far outside the start town where the non-beta players would be unaware of, and the two form a party. A few weeks later, Asuna and Mito head off to kill nepenthes, a plant-based monster located in a mountainous terrain of the floor. Mito warns Asuna that killing the nepenthes with a ball over its head will cause it to spew out smoke and trigger a massive assault of nearby plants, and to avoid it at all cost. During battle, Mito leaves to capture a rare sly shrewman and during that time Asuna unknowingly kills the nepenthes with the overhead ball, triggering an onslaught of them. Mito attempts to save Asuna but is forced over a cliff by the plants and is unable to reach her as the nepenthes begin travelling down the mountain to attack her. Watching Asuna's health bar fall down to dangerous levels, Mito panics and leaves their newly formed party. Asuna receives the disbanded party notice just in time to get attacked by an even more dangerous monster after killing all the nepenthes. Before she is killed, Kirito arrives and eliminates the monster. He offers her healing potions and a map back to the nearest town before abruptly leaving.

On the morning of November 27, 2022, Asuna wakes up alone in her lodge room and declares that if she is to die in this new world, she will go out in her own way. She purchases a cloak and spends the next three days killing monsters inside a cave. Kirito enters the cave and insists that she go to the nearest town and recuperate her health before she is killed, to which she refuses and suddenly collapses from exhaustion. She awakens outside of it, having been dragged out by Kirito, who requests that she join him in town for a group meeting on preparation for defeating the first floor boss.

The two arrive in town and attend the meeting organized by the player Diabel, who announces to the attendants that they will all form multiple sets of parties and strategize in order to defeat the floor boss, Illfang the Kobold Lord, tomorrow morning. Asuna notices that Mito is one of the players in attendance but fails to interact with her as she feels betrayed because she left her to die. Later that night, Kirito gives Asuna a new sword and the two practice their fighting strategy. During this, Asuna asks Kirito if beta testers are bad people as she explains to him that she was deserted by one as she was just about to die. Kirito goes on to explain that he had a previous similar experience and feels that she was simply scared to lose her own life and chose to save herself in the moment, which gives Asuna some relief on the matter.

The next day, Kirito, Asuna, Mito, Diabel and the remaining group of party members arrive at the boss room and battle Illfang and his minion sentinels. When Illfang's health becomes low, Diabel goes for the finishing attack, but before he can see Illfang's true weapon, he is mortally wounded by its onslaught. With his dying breath, Diabel tells Kirito to defeat the boss and save the players at all costs. With the assistance of Asuna and Mito, Kirito successfully defeats Illfang, but after the victory, the other players immediately accuse Kirito of letting Diabel die by having previous knowledge about Illfang he did not share with the players and they proceed to label him a "beater", a combination of the words "beta-tester" and "cheater". Kirito accepts this title and claims the prize for defeating Illfang: a black leather trench coat. He then becomes the first player to clear the first floor by stepping through the gate.

After discovering the cloaked girl with Kirito was actually Asuna, Mito apologizes to her for what happened back in the mountains and offers to form a party with her again. Asuna declines the offer, believing that she has found her own path forward within this world and that it involves Kirito. The two depart as Asuna joins Kirito on the second floor and the two formally exchange their names with each other. As the two head off to activate the second floor teleporter, a mysterious girl can be seen hiding behind the floor gate, apparently eager that the two current strongest players have joined forces.

== Voice cast ==
Character Name		Voice Cast	
English	Japanese	Japanese	English
Kirito / Kazuto Kirigaya	Kirito (キリト) / Kirigaya Kazuto (桐ヶ谷 和人)	Yoshitsugu Matsuoka	Bryce Papenbrook
Asuna / Asuna Yuuki	Asuna (アスナ) / Yuuki Asuna (結城 明日奈)	Haruka Tomatsu	Cherami Leigh
Mito / Misumi Tozawa	Mito (ミト) / Tozawa Misumi (兎沢 深澄)	Inori Minase; Ryūsei Nakao (Beta Avatar)	Anairis Quiñones; Kayleigh McKee (Beta Avatar)
Shozo Yuuki	Yuuki Shōzō (結城彰三)	Kazuhiro Yamaji	Keith Silverstein
Kyoko Yuuki	Yuuki Kyōkō (結城 京子)	Megumi Hayashibara	Dorothy Elias-Fahn
Koichiro Yuuki	Yūki Kōichirō (結城浩一郎)	Junji Majima	Ryan Colt Levy
Akiyo Sada	Sada Akiyo (佐田 明代)	Sayaka Kobayashi	Michelle Ruff
Silica / Keiko Ayano	Shirika (シリカ) / Ayano Keiko (綾野珪子)	Rina Hidaka	Christine Marie Cabanos
Klein / Ryotaro Tsuboi	Kurain (クライン) / Tsuboi Ryōtarō (壷井遼太郎)	Hiroaki Hirata	Kirk Thornton
Agil / Andrew Gilbert Mills	Egiru (エギル) / Andoryū Girubāto Miruzu / (アンドリュー・ギルバート・ミルズ)	Hiroki Yasumoto	Patrick Seitz
Akihiko Kayaba	Kayaba Akihiko (茅場晶彦)	Koichi Yamadera	David W. Collins
Argo / Tomo Carina Hosaka	Arugo (アルゴ) / Hosaka Karīna Tomo (帆坂 カリーナ 朋)	Shiori Izawa	Kimberley Anne Campbell
Kibao	Kiabō (キバオウ)	Tomokazu Seki	Derek Stephen Prince
Diabel	Diaberu (ディアベル)	Nobuyuki Hiyama	Sean Chiplock
Johnny Black / Atsushi Kanamoto	Jonī Burakku (ジョニー・ブラック) / Kanamoto Atsushi (金本 敦)	Ryōta Ōsaka	Alejandro Saab

== Production ==
After the finale of Sword Art Online: Alicization – War of Underworld, an anime film adaptation of Sword Art Online: Progressive was announced on September 19, 2020. A first teaser trailer and key visual of the anime film was also released on the same day. An official teaser trailer of the anime film was released on AnimeUS, which showcases Asuna in civilian clothing staring at an advertisement of the Sword Art Online, a virtual reality (VR) game, developed by the company named Argus and scheduled for release on November 6, 2022. The key visual showcases Asuna drawing her sword, as the massive city of Aincrad floats above her head.

The trailer of the film was released on AnimeUS and Aniplex USA on November 8 and November 19, 2020, respectively. The first trailer of the film was released of the official Twitter account of the anime. The official English website of the anime film was launched on November 19, 2020. It was later revealed to be a new film titled Sword Art Online the Movie -Progressive- Aria of a Starless Night, as per the official English website. The film is set to premiere in fall 2021.

Ayako Kōno is directing the film, with Yasuyuki Kai as the action director, and A-1 Pictures returning for production. The voice cast from the anime series returned to reprise their roles in the film, including voice actor Yoshitsugu Matsuoka as Kirito and Haruka Tomatsu as Asuna.

On March 27, 2021, it was announced that the film would be released theatrically in Japan in Autumn 2021. Along with the new trailer, a second key visual was released, with Inori Minase joining the cast as the new character Mito. On July 3, 2021, at Aniplex Online Fest 2021, a new poster revealed that the film's release date would be October 30, 2021.

The film is an adaptation of the first volume of the Sword Art Online: Progressive light novel series. This light novel series is a remake of the Sword Art Online tale that starts at the beginning of Kirito and Asuna's adventure – on the very first level of the world of Aincrad. The title, "Aria of a Starless Night" is taken from the first chapter of the first volume of the light novel series which covers events that took place on first floor of Aincrad.

Mito is an anime original character created exclusively for the film series and did not previously exist in the original Progressive light novel series.

== Release ==
=== Japan ===
The film premiered on October 30, 2021, in Japan. The advance ticket booking was announced on December 25, 2020, on the film's official website. The theatrical version of the first limited-edition advance ticket using a teaser visual with Asuna standing in front of Aincrad was released on December 28, 2020, and ended on January 11, 2021 (Monday) on the Aniplex+ website. Aniplex announced that the film's first limited-edition advance ticket has recorded the world's fastest advance ticket sale. These limited-edition advance tickets were expected to be delivered by the end of February 2021.

A stage exhibition for the film was announced on February 18, 2021, to be held at the "Connect Green Stage" of AnimeJapan 2021 from March 27 to March 28, 2021, with the event being held online due to the COVID-19 pandemic.

The second limited-edition ticket sales began on March 27, 2021, and end on April 11, 2021. The theatrical version of the first limited-edition advance ticket depicting Asuna and Kirito standing against the night sky. These limited-edition advance tickets were scheduled to be delivered sequentially from the beginning of June 2021. Another special edition ticket sale was announced namely Mubichike card. The sale of these tickets begins on April 10, 2021. The second edition of this card has been planned. A list of theatres participating in Autumn 2021 release was announced by the official website.

On June 23, 2021, the "Public Commemorative Special Program" will be broadcast on ABEMA TV on July 7, 2021. The introduction of the series and the latest information on the film will be released. On July 4, 2021, more information about the film was released at Aniplex Online Fest 2021. Among the information released were the new "Aincrad" edition poster drawn by Reki Kawahara was released, revealing the theatrical release date for Japan. The second edition of Mubichike card was announced. The sale of these tickets begins on July 10, 2021. This card can be used at theaters nationwide. A new service named "Mubichike Digital Card" was announced to be implemented, setting record to be the first digital movie ticket in history of Cinema of Japan.

The film and its sequel Sword Art Online Progressive: Scherzo of Deep Night premiered on television for the first time on Fuji Television on January 20 and 21, 2024 respectively. (Note: Aria of a Starless Night is listed to premiere at 24:55 on January 19, 2024, which is January 20 at 0:55 a.m. Scherzo of Deep Night is listed to premiere at 26:15 on January 20, 2024, which is January 21 at 2:15 a.m.)

=== International ===
Aniplex of America licensed the film for release in North American theaters in 2021. Funimation partnered with Aniplex and theatrically distributed the film in both Japanese with English subtitles and an English dub in the United States and Canada on December 3, the United Kingdom, Ireland, Australia and New Zealand on December 9.

The film was also released in South Africa on December 10 with an English Dub showing.

The film was also released in India on February 25, 2022, with an English Sub.

A virtual exhibition for the film took place during Aniplex Online Fest 2021 on July 3, 2021. ODEX Anime via their official YouTube channel announced that the film is coming soon in Singapore, Malaysia, Indonesia, Philippines, Vietnam, Brunei, Myanmar, Cambodia, Laos, and Mongolia. The film will also be released in GCC and MENA regions.

The film was also released in the IMAX format, with native IMAX 12-track sound mix. It also remarks the first film in native Dolby Atmos sound mix and Dolby Vision HDR treatment in the series.

== Reception ==
=== Box office ===
The film grossed around 1,326,146,793 yen (about US$11.67 million) as of December 13, 2021, in Japan. In the United States and Canada, the film made $1.05 million in its opening weekend, finishing tenth at the box office.

=== Critical response ===
Richard Eisenbeis of Anime News Network praised the film as a "solid introduction to Asuna" that puts her relationship with Kirito in a new light, commending its "crystal clear" animation, flashily executed battle scenes, and unexpected character arcs, though he noted it "doesn't come close to reaching the heights" of the main story. Melvyn Tan of Anime Trending reported that it "delivers on that front" with an enjoyable combination of action and music, praising the welcome decision to position Asuna as the lead character, though he noted that some surprisingly stiff non-action animation and a newly introduced character who ultimately felt tacked on distracted from the big screen experience.

Marc York of CBR gave the film a highly positive review, stating that it is a "viewing experience worthy of the big screen" that features well-developed characters, an engaging story, and stunningly cinematic action scenes, while noting that changing the main protagonist to Asuna successfully enhances the narrative's general sense of danger. Writing for Anime Corner, Tamara Lazic said, "Sword Art Online Progressive: Aria of a Starless Night is a visually sumptuous, science-fiction action-adventure entry that delivers top-tier animation and thrilling combat for longtime fans, even as its Asuna-focused retelling and an underused new character leave the narrative feeling uneven at times."

Sage Ashford of Comicon.com stated that positioning Asuna as the lead protagonist is a "welcome change" that helps ground the series and develop one of the franchise's most important characters.

=== Accolades ===
Year	Award	Category	Nominee(s)	Result	Ref.
2022	Newtype Anime Awards	Best Picture (Film)	Sword Art Online Progressive: Aria of a Starless Night	Won	
2022	Newtype Anime Awards	Best Male Character	Kirito	Won	
2022	Newtype Anime Awards	Best Female Character	Asuna	Won	
2022	Newtype Anime Awards	Best Female Character	Mito	Nominated	
2022	Newtype Anime Awards	Best Theme Song	"Yuke" by LiSA	Won	
2022	Newtype Anime Awards	Best Director	Ayako Kōno	Nominated	
2022	Newtype Anime Awards	Best Screenplay	Yukito Kizawa	Nominated	
2022	Newtype Anime Awards	Best Character Design	Kento Toya	Won	
2022	Newtype Anime Awards	Best Sound	Yuki Kajiura	Won	
2022	Newtype Anime Awards	Best Prop/Mecha Design	Sword Art Online Progressive: Aria of a Starless Night	Nominated	

== Sequel ==
A sequel film titled Sword Art Online Progressive: Scherzo of Deep Night premiered on October 22, 2022. It was initially scheduled for September 10, 2022, but was later delayed due to production issues caused by the COVID-19 pandemic. It adapts the fourth volume of the light novel series, due to one of the overarching storylines not being completed in the original light novel series.
