= Sword Art Online Progressive: Scherzo of Deep Night =

2022 Japanese film

Sword Art Online: Progressive – Scherzo of Deep Night
- Theatrical release poster

Japanese name
- Kanji: 劇場版 ソードアート・オンライン -プログレッシブ- 冥き夕闇のスケルツォ
Transcriptions
- Revised Hepburn: Gekijōban Sōdo Āto Onrain Puroguresshibu Kuraki Yūyami no Sukerutso
- Directed by: Ayako Kōno
- Screenplay by: Yukito Kizawa
- Story by: Reki Kawahara
- Based on: Sword Art Online: Progressive by Reki Kawahara
- Produced by: Kaoru Adachi; Yousuke Futami; Masami Niwa; Kazuki Uejima; Hiroyuki Yuzawa
- Starring: Yoshitsugu Matsuoka; Haruka Tomatsu; Inori Minase
- Cinematography: Yuki Ōshima
- Edited by: Kiyoshi Hirose
- Music by: Yuki Kajiura
- Production company: A-1 Pictures
- Distributed by: Aniplex
- Release date: October 22, 2022
- Running time: 100 minutes
- Country: Japan
- Language: Japanese
- Box office: US$9.07 million

Sword Art Online: Progressive – Scherzo of Deep Night (Japanese: 劇場版 ソードアート・オンライン -プログレッシブ- 冥き夕闇のスケルツォ, Hepburn: Gekijōban Sōdo Āto Onrain Puroguresshibu Kuraki Yūyami no Sukerutso) is a 2022 Japanese animated science fiction action adventure film based on the Sword Art Online: Progressive light novels written by Reki Kawahara and illustrated by abec, and a sequel to the 2021 film Sword Art Online: Progressive – Aria of a Starless Night. The staff and cast from the first film reprised their roles, including production by A-1 Pictures and direction by Ayako Kōno, with character designs by Kento Toya and music by Yuki Kajiura. It was released on July 14, 2023.

== Plot ==
In December 2022, the two lead guilds ALS and DKB, along with a few other players, defeat the 4th floor boss. The two guilds are somewhat at odds with each other over how to complete the game. After, main characters Asuna and Kirito along with side character Argo discuss a New Year's party planned by the two guilds. Asuna and Kirito go into the dungeon below the 5th floor's main town, where Asuna overhears two other players have conceived a plan to destroy the two guilds; the plan includes the guild ALS walking out of the party to kill the 5th floor raid boss, where it had otherwise been a joint effort.

Kirito and Asuna later discuss the negative impact that ALS killing the raid boss would have on the effort to finish the game and then confront the leader of ALS, Kibaou, who acknowledges the plan's existence. He reasons that the 5th floor boss has a powerful item that would give his guild the advantage in clearing the floors, but that he was forced into the plan by a faction within his guild. He gives a mixed blessing to Kirito, Asuna, and any other group who attempts and succeeds in killing the raid boss before his guild attempts to kill it. Kirito and Asuna gather a few members for their raid but fail to recruit Mito who is still disappointed by her actions in the previous film.

Kirito, Asuna, and their raid group enter the dungeon and kill the monsters on the way to the raid boss. They discuss strategy before sending Kirito and Argo to scout the raid boss' room, only to start the fight by accident. The fight initially involves the boss' arms and legs attacking the players when the players step on lines on the ground. Shortly, the rest of the raid joins the group but set off the same attacks unwittingly. They eventually do enough damage to the raid boss where it exposes a crest, known to be a weakness, before the head hides itself. When the group attempts to retreat, the head comes out of the ground and seizes Asuna, who is freed by the surprise appearance of Mito. Then the crest begins appearing at random locations on the arms and legs of the raid boss; after a number of attacks on the crest, the raid boss materializes as a golem with the crest on his face. They subsequently destroy the golem and retrieve the rare item. While the rest of their party leaves to the 6th floor, Asuna and Kirito confront the now-arrived guild ALS. Kirito provides two conditions for providing the item, neither of which the guild then agrees to, but otherwise the guild peacefully departs.

Later, on New Year's Eve on the 5th floor, Kirito and Asuna are ambushed by another player. They briefly scuffle and then the unnamed player disappears, wherein Kirito and Asuna realize the existence of a group or guild dedicated to killing other players. The film concludes with the two enjoying fireworks.

== Voice cast ==
Character Name		Voice Cast	
English	Japanese	Japanese	English
Kirito / Kazuto Kirigaya	Kirito (キリト) / Kirigaya Kazuto (桐ヶ谷 和人)	Yoshitsugu Matsuoka	Bryce Papenbrook
Asuna / Asuna Yuuki	Asuna (アスナ) / Yuuki Asuna (結城 明日奈)	Haruka Tomatsu	Cherami Leigh
Argo / Carina Tomo Hosaka	Arugo (アルゴ) / Hosaka Karīna Tomo (帆坂 カリーナ 朋)	Shiori Izawa	Kimberley Anne Campbell
Mito / Misumi Tozawa	Mito (ミト) / Tozawa Misumi (兎沢 深澄)	Inori Minase	Anairis Quiñones
Liten	Rīten (リーテン)	Kaede Hondo	AmaLee
Morte	Morute (モルテ)	Yūsuke Kobayashi	A.J. Beckles
Agil / Andrew Gilbert Mills	Egiru (エギル) / Andoryū Girubāto Miruzu / (アンドリュー・ギルバート・ミルズ)	Hiroki Yasumoto	Patrick Seitz
Kibaou	Kibaō (キバオウ)	Tomokazu Seki	Derek Stephen Prince

== Production ==
Shortly after the release of Sword Art Online Progressive: Aria of a Starless Night, a sequel film and its title was announced, with its release set for 2022. The staff and cast from the previous film reprised their roles, such as production by A-1 Pictures and direction by Ayako Kōno, with character designs by Kento Toya and music by Yuki Kajiura. Eir Aoi performed the film's main theme, "Shinzō" (心臓, Heart).

The film adapted the fourth volume of the light novel series due to one of the overarching storylines of the series not being completed.

== Release ==
The film was initially set to have an advance screening on August 24, 2022, before a full theatrical release on September 10. However, the release was delayed to October 22 due to the COVID-19 pandemic in Japan. Aniplex of America licensed the film for release in North America on February 3, 2023.

Its prequel Sword Art Online Progressive: Aria of a Starless Night and the film itself premiered on television for the first time on Fuji Television on January 20 and 21, 2024 respectively. (Note: Aria of a Starless Night is listed to premiere at 24:55 on January 19, 2024, which is January 20 at 0:55 a.m. Scherzo of Deep Night is listed to premiere at 26:15 on January 20, 2024, which is January 21 at 2:15 a.m.)

== Reception ==
=== Critical response ===
Richard Eisenbeis of Anime News Network gave the film a "C+" rating, praising the world-building, production, and soundtrack, but criticizing its over-reliance to the same tropes presented in its predecessor, making the film "both more predictable and less emotionally powerful." Writing for The Guardian, Phil Hoad gave the film two out of five stars, praising its action sequences and animation, but criticizing its plot, noting "there is precious little ambition here beyond what feels like a clunky and redundant transposition of the videogaming experience." Meanwhile, Nick Valdez of Comic Book Resources gave it a positive review, praising its production and characters, but noted that the film is for longtime viewers and fans of the Sword Art Online franchise.

Brittany Vincent of IGN gave the film an unfavorable review, writing that while it is an "enjoyable enough return to the world of Aincrad" for longtime fans, it ultimately feels like a step backward due to its "rote story" and a strange, disappointing character devolution that transforms Asuna into a shadow of her former self. Cezary Jan Strusiewicz of Polygon also gave it a negative review, describing it as an "inconsequential pit stop" that is "just too safe and familiar", criticizing its predictable plot and a frustrating character downgrade that relegates Asuna back to cliché girl status, despite praising the phenomenal breakneck pace of the final boss battle. Matthew Magnus Lundeen, for Game Rant, said that while the film offers well-animated fight scenes, great music, and a tense boss battle, it ultimately serves as a "disappointing" and structurally "confused" anniversary celebration that leaves the viewer entertained but underwhelmed due to its "sluggish" early pacing, narrative inconsistency, and bizarre dialogue choices.

Melvyn Tan of Anime Trending reported that it provided "pleasant enjoyment" despite a "less engaging" main story, praising its memorable duels, the strong presence of supporting character Argo, and the cute chemistry between Asuna and Kirito, though he noted that the final battle lacked the punchiness and desperate intensity of the franchise's best action sequences. Writing for Anime Corner, Tamara Lazic said, "Sword Art Online Progressive: Scherzo of Deep Night is a highly enjoyable collection of some of the best that SAO has to offer, delivering top-of-the-line animation and a natural progression for Kirito and Asuna's relationship, though it ultimately doesn't offer anything new and feels like filler while we wait for the return of the TV anime."

Lucy-Jo Finnighan of Dexerto gave the film a score of 2 out of 5, describing it as "an experience we wish we could escape from too" despite its pretty animation and an enjoyable score, heavily criticizing its "painful to watch" waifu escapism, low narrative stakes, and a frustrating dynamic that sacrifices Asuna's focus to keep Kirito an overpowered blank slate. Abhishek Srivastava, for The Times of India, gave it a mixed-to-positive review, describing it as an "enjoyable experience" that effectively fulfills its purpose of entertaining the audience, while praising its well-defined main characters, refreshing relationship dynamics, and outstanding soundtrack, though he noted that the plot becomes somewhat disorganized in its execution.
