= Newtype =

Japanese pop culture magazine

- Cover of the May 2024 issue, featuring Delicious in Dungeon
- Categories: Anime, manga, tokusatsu, Japanese science fiction, and video games
- Frequency: Monthly
- Circulation: 160,750
- First issue: March 8, 1985; 41 years ago
- Company: Kadokawa Shoten
- Country: Japan
- Based in: Tokyo
- Language: Japanese
- Website: webnewtype.com

Newtype (Japanese: ニュータイプ, Hepburn: Nyūtaipu) is a monthly magazine originating from Japan covering anime and, to a lesser extent, manga, voice actors, science fiction, tokusatsu, and video games. It was launched by publishing company Kadokawa Shoten on March 8, 1985, and has since been released in Japan on the 10th of every month.

Newtype Korea was formerly published in South Korea. Spin-off publications of Newtype also exist in Japan, such as Newtype Hero and Newtype the Live, which are dedicated to tokusatsu and New Words, which is geared toward a more adult market, as well as numerous limited-run versions such as Clamp Newtype. An English-language version, Newtype USA, was published in North America between 2002 and 2008.

The magazine's name comes from the "Newtypes" in the Universal Century timeline of the Gundam series, specifically Mobile Suit Gundam (1979) and its sequel Mobile Suit Zeta Gundam (1985). Newtype launched a week after Zeta Gundam began airing on March 2, 1985.

== Content ==
=== Columns ===
Newtype runs several columns per month, typically written by creators within the anime and manga industries. Past and current contributors include Satsuki Igarashi (of Clamp), Mahiro Maeda, and Gilles Poitras. Newtype USA included columns from more history-minded writers (such as Jonathan Clements) as well as individuals involved in the US anime industry (such as Monica Rial).

=== Manga ===
Newtype usually contains a center insert with regularly serialized manga (often to be later published in tankōbon form by Kadokawa). The magazine is perhaps best known in Japan for serializing Mamoru Nagano's The Five Star Stories.

Manga serialized in Newtype USA varied due to licensing reasons. They had included Full Metal Panic!, Angel/Dust, Chrono Crusade, Lagoon Engine Einsatz, Neon Genesis Evangelion: Angelic Days, Angel/Dust Neo, and Kobato, only several of which actually appeared in the Japanese Newtype.

=== Fiction ===
Light novels have also been serialized within the Japanese version of the magazine in the past: these have included "For the Barrel" (an abstract adaptation of the Mobile Suit Gundam novel trilogy); a novelization of Overman King Gainer (accompanied by illustrations from the show's character designer, Kinu Nishimura); and the Yoshiyuki Tomino story "Gaia Gear", set in the far future of Gundam's Universal Century timeline.

=== Television schedule ===
A large insert within the magazine usually contains a television schedule for anime and tokusatsu programs set to run on various Japanese networks throughout the coming month, accompanied by synopses for each aired episode and network ratings for each show from the previous month.

=== Art-related material ===
Newtype contains a tip column for working with computer graphics in manga-style illustration, written by a different guest illustrator (or group of illustrators, in some cases) each month. The column generally centers around working with Adobe Photoshop and Corel Painter.

In the Japanese version (and in the early months of the American version), the last page of Newtype is usually reserved for one of a series of art pieces or illustrations (accompanied by comment or short column) from a known anime illustrator. Perhaps the best known of these is the "GUNDAM FIX" illustration series by Hajime Katoki, which placed mecha from the Gundam franchise within real-world photographic contexts. Other illustrators who have contributed to this back page in the past include Yoshikazu Yasuhiko (who ran a series of illustrations devoted to Mobile Suit Gundam: The Origin) and Hisashi Hirai (who ran a series devoted to his designs for Mobile Suit Gundam SEED, titled "Gundam SEED RGB").

== International versions ==
Newtype USA included both translated Japanese content and original U.S. material. Content included anime, manga, music, game, toy and model reviews, director interviews, artist profiles, and regular columns by industry experts, tastemakers, and deep-cover insiders. Newtype USA also included bonus content, such as posters, postcards, a centerfold spread, serialized manga, and a DVD insert. Newtype USA was published by A.D. Vision, parent company of the anime distributor ADV Films and manga publisher ADV Manga, but the magazine still featured content and promotional material from properties distributed by competing publishers. About 70% of the material is translated from the Japanese release, including matching cover and front story, and articles from American writers. Subscriptions on initial release were expected to hit 50,000.

The first Newtype USA issue was published in November 2002 (a preview issue of Newtype USA featuring RahXephon was distributed selectively at anime and comic conventions in late Q3 2002). and ended publication after the February 2008 issue. After its initial print run, sealed polybagged back issues of Newtype USA are considered highly collectible. It was replaced in 2008 with PiQ magazine, which ceased publication after four issues.

Newtype was also published in South Korea by Daewon C.I. under the name Newtype Korea. The first issue was released in July 1999 and the magazine lasted until June 2015, when the last issue was published. The magazine included translated Japanese content, with added emphasis on domestic South Korean animation projects. Daewon C.I. also used the Newtype branding for a line of imported Japanese animation DVDs and light novels, called "Newtype DVD" and "Newtype Light Novel" respectively. Both the original Japanese and English editions used the right-to-left format while the South Korean edition is reversed.

== Newtype Anime Awards ==
List of award winners
Year	Best TV Anime	Best Anime Film	Best Director	Best Actor	Best Supporting Actor	Best Actress	Best Supporting Actress	Best Male Character	Best Female Character	Ref.
2011	Puella Magi Madoka Magica	Macross Frontier the Movie: The Wings of Goodbye	Akiyuki Shinbo	Mamoru Miyano	Keiji Fujiwara	Aoi Yūki	Chiwa Saitō	Rintaro Okabe	Homura Akemi	
				Best Actor		Best Actress				
2012	Fate/Zero	K-On! the Movie	Atsushi Nishigori	Akio Ōtsuka		Eriko Nakamura		Rider	Haruka Amami	
2013	Attack on Titan	Steins;Gate: The Movie − Load Region of Déjà Vu	Tetsurō Araki	Tomokazu Sugita		Miyuki Sawashiro		Rintaro Okabe	Mikasa Ackerman	
2014	Kill la Kill	The Idolmaster Movie: Beyond the Brilliant Future!	Atsushi Nishigori	Yūki Kaji		Eriko Nakamura		Kazuto Kirigaya	Haruka Amami	
2015	Fate/stay night: Unlimited Blade Works	Psycho-Pass: The Movie	Takahiro Miura	Takuya Eguchi		Kana Hanazawa		Hachiman Hikigaya	Yukino Yukinoshita	
2016	Kabaneri of the Iron Fortress	Your Name	Masaharu Watanabe	Hiroshi Kamiya		Inori Minase		Subaru Natsuki	Rem	
2017	Fate/Apocrypha	Sword Art Online the Movie: Ordinal Scale	Takuya Igarashi	Yūichirō Umehara		Miyuki Sawashiro		Kazuto Kirigaya	Asuna Yuuki	
2018	The Idolmaster SideM	Bungo Stray Dogs: Dead Apple	Takuya Igarashi	Mamoru Miyano		Kana Hanazawa		Teru Tendo	Kyōka Izumi	
2019	Demon Slayer: Kimetsu no Yaiba	Promare	Haruo Sotozaki	Natsuki Hanae		Akari Kitō		Tanjiro Kamado	Nezuko Kamado	
2020	Kaguya-sama: Love Is War?	KonoSuba: God's Blessing on This Wonderful World! Legend of Crimson	Mamoru Hatakeyama	Makoto Furukawa		Aoi Koga		Miyuki Shirogane	Kaguya Shinomiya	
2021	Jujutsu Kaisen	Demon Slayer: Kimetsu no Yaiba – The Movie: Mugen Train	Haruo Sotozaki	Mamoru Miyano		Akari Kitō		Kyojuro Rengoku	Nezuko Kamado	
2022	Demon Slayer: Kimetsu no Yaiba Entertainment District Arc	Sword Art Online Progressive: Aria of a Starless Night	Haruo Sotozaki	Yoshitsugu Matsuoka		Aoi Koga		Kazuto Kirigaya	Asuna Yuuki	
				Best Voice Actor						
2023	Bocchi the Rock!	Sword Art Online Progressive: Scherzo of Deep Night	Keiichirō Saitō	Lynn				Kazuto Kirigaya	Suletta Mercury	
2024	Jujutsu Kaisen: Hidden Inventory / Premature Death & Shibuya Incident	Mobile Suit Gundam SEED Freedom	Shōta Goshozono	Yoshino Aoyama				Satoru Gojo	Frieren	
2025	Makeine: Too Many Losing Heroines!	Bocchi the Rock! Re:Re:	Kazuya Tsurumaki	Hikaru Tono				Kazuhiko Nukumizu	Hitori Gotō	
2026	Daemons of the Shadow Realm	Demon Slayer: Kimetsu no Yaiba – The Movie: Infinity Castle	Masahiro Andō	Kenjiro Tsuda				Satoru Gojo	Gigi Andalusia	

== See also ==
- List of animation awards
