= Angel/Dust =

Japanese manga

- North American cover of Angel/Dust

エンジェル/ダスト (Enjyeru/Dasuto)
- Genre: Action, Drama, Fantasy
- Manga
- Written by: Aoi Nanase
- Published by: Kadokawa Shoten
- English publisher: NA: ADV Manga
- Magazine: Newtype
- Original run: May 2000 – January 2001
- Volumes: 1

Angel/Dust (エンジェル/ダスト, Enjyeru/Dasuto) is a Japanese manga by Aoi Nanase. It was originally serialized in Newtype, and the chapters were collected into a single volume in June 2001. It has a sequel entitled Angel/Dust Neo. ADV Manga licensed this manga for release in English, and in 2005 it was serialized in the English version of Newtype. The English collected volume was released on November 22, 2005.

Angel/Dust tells the story of Yuina Hatori, a liceal student who desires to conduct a normal life, without make troubles to others. But, one day, she has an unexpected meeting with a particular creature. They then merge and try to catch "the black winged one," Lucifer.

== Story ==
Yuina Hatori is a shy high school sophomore who lives with her aunt because her mother is deceased and her father is too busy with his work to care for her. She dislikes speaking up for herself because she fears troubling others. Her one passion is singing, but as she is so timid, she is unable to sing in front of others. She believes her life to be normal, but then she has an encounter with Seraph, a humanoid android, an "Emulate" who is searching for Lucifer, the "black winged one." Things only complicate more when Yuina's childhood friend, Akiho Kudoh, transfers to her school.

== Characters ==
Yuina Hatori (羽鳥ゆいな Hatori Yuina)

- The main character of the story. She is withdrawn and doesn't want to trouble anyone. She enjoys singing, but she lacks confidence in her abilities.

Seraph (セラフ Serafu)

- An Emulate from another point in space and time. Like all Emulates, she is a battle android who can make contracts with humans and merge with them to give them great power. Before she made a contract with Yuina, her former human was a beautiful woman who also enjoyed singing.

Lucifer (ルシフェル Rushiferu)

- Known as the "black winged one" to Seraph. She is one of seven Emulates who refused to submit to humans and thus committed the most terrible of sins, in her words. She hates humans because she believes them to be arrogant, violent creatures. She is named after the fallen angel.

Akiho Kudoh (久遠あきほ Kudo Akiho)

- Yuina's childhood friend. She makes a contract with Lucifer so that she can fight with Yuina. She is frustrated by what she perceives as Yuina throwing away her singing talents.
