= The Isolator (novel series) =

Japanese light novel series

- First light novel volume cover

絶対ナル孤独者(アイソレータ) (Zettai Naru Kodoku-sha(Aisorēta))
- Genre: Science fiction
- Novel series
- Written by: Reki Kawahara (as Fumio Kunori)
- Published by: Self-published
- Original run: 2004 – 2009
- Light novel
- Written by: Reki Kawahara
- Illustrated by: Shimeji
- Published by: ASCII Media Works
- English publisher: NA: Yen Press
- Imprint: Dengeki Bunko
- Original run: June 10, 2014 – present
- Volumes: 5
- Manga
- Written by: Reki Kawahara
- Illustrated by: Naoki Koshimizu
- Published by: ASCII Media Works
- English publisher: NA: Yen Press
- Magazine: Dengeki Daioh
- Original run: June 27, 2015 – January 27, 2018
- Volumes: 4

The Isolator: Realization of Absolute Solitude (Japanese: 絶対ナル孤独者(アイソレータ), Hepburn: Zettai Naru Kodoku-sha(Aisorēta); lit. 'Absolute Solitary Person "Isolator"') is a Japanese light novel series written by Reki Kawahara and illustrated by Shimeji. Kawahara originally released the series as a web novel under the title "Absolute Solitude" (絶対ナル孤独, Zettai Naru Kodoku) on his website from 2004 to 2009. ASCII Media Works has published five volumes since June 2014. A manga adaptation, illustrated by Naoki Koshimizu, was serialized in Dengeki Daioh. Yen Press has licensed the novels and manga in North America.

== Plot ==
When Minoru Utsugi was eight years old, home invaders killed his parents and older sister while he hid in a cabinet. At 16, he still struggles with the trauma. Then mysterious alien orbs descend from the sky and take up residence inside some humans, granting them each a superpower that reflects their deepest desire. Minoru's power is the ability to protect himself inside an impenetrable shell. Some people gain a more active power, and not everyone uses their power for good.

== Characters ==
Protagonists
Minoru Utsugi (空木 ミノル, Utsugi Minoru), code name Isolator
Tomomi Minowa (箕輪 朋美, Minowa Tomomi)
Yumiko Azu (安須 ユミコ, Azu Yumiko), code name Accelerator
Norie Yoshimizu (由水 典江, Yoshimizu Norie)
Riri Isa (伊佐 理々, Isa Riri), code name Speculator
Olivier Saito (斉藤 オリヴィエ, Saitou Orivie), code name Divider
Denjirou Daimon (大門 伝二郎, Daimon Denjirou) (DD), code name Searcher

Antagonists
Hikaru Takaesu (高江洲 晃, Takaesu Hikaru), code name Biter
Yousuke Nakakubo (中久保 洋介, Nakakubo Yousuke), code name Igniter
Trancer
Stinger
Liquidizer

== Media ==
=== Light novels ===
No.	Original release date	Original ISBN	English release date	English ISBN
1	June 10, 2014	978-4-04-866510-0	June 23, 2015	978-0-316-26059-6
Fragment 1; Fragment 2; Sect.001 -The Biter-
2	February 10, 2015	978-4-04-869248-9	January 26, 2016	978-0-316-26889-9
Sect.002 -The Igniter-
3	February 10, 2016	978-4-04-865748-8	November 22, 2016	978-0-316-55272-1
Interlude 1 -The Retriever-; Sect.003 -The Trancer-
4	May 10, 2017	978-4-04-892894-6	June 26, 2018	978-1-9753-2627-2
Sect.004 -The Stinger-
5	May 10, 2019	978-4-04-912382-1	March 17, 2020	978-1-9753-0786-8
Sect.005 -The Liquidizer-

=== Manga ===
No.	Original release date	Original ISBN	English release date	English ISBN
1	February 10, 2016	978-4-04-865656-6	January 24, 2017	978-0-316-50464-5
2	October 8, 2016	978-4-04-892292-0	November 14, 2017	978-0-316-43976-3
3	July 10, 2017	978-4-04-892920-2	April 17, 2018	978-1-9753-0016-6
4	March 10, 2018	978-4-04-893645-3	December 11, 2018	978-1-9753-2916-7

== Reception ==
Yen Press' English edition of the first light novel volume received a positive review from Anime News Network. It was praised for its "believable characters" and the thought that "switching between the hero and villain's point of view really works." However, it was said that Shimeji's illustrations can make Takaesu (the antagonist of the first volume) "more wolf-like than shark-like in some images."
