= Aoi Nanase =

Japanese manga artist

Aoi Nanase 七瀬 葵
- Born: June 12, 1967 (age 59) Japan
- Area: Manga artist

Aoi Nanase (七瀬 葵, Nanase Aoi) is a Japanese manga artist.

== Works ==
=== Anime ===
- Seraphim Call
- Samurai Spirits 2: Asura Zanmaeden

=== Printed Works ===
- Artbooks
  - Angel Flavor
  - Seven Colors of Wind
- Manga
  - Angel/Dust (エンジェル/ダスト)
  - Angel/Dust Neo (エンジェル/ダストネオ)
  - Petit Monster (ぷちモン, Puchimon)
  - Heaven
  - Where the wind returns to (Oneshot)
- Light Novel
  - Report of the Nature Spirits (気象精霊記) (Illustrations)

=== Games ===
- Aquarian Age TCG
- Asuka 120%
- Eithéa (アイシア) (PS1 game)
- Dimension 0 (Zero)
- Monster Collection
