= Angel/Dust Neo =

Japanese manga

- Angel/Dust neo
- North American cover of Angel/Dust Neo

エンジェル/ダスト neo (Enjyeru/Dasuto neo)
- Genre: Fantasy, Harem
- Manga
- Written by: Aoi Nanase
- Published by: Kadokawa Shoten
- English publisher: NA: ADV Manga
- Magazine: Newtype
- Original run: August 2002 – June 2003
- Volumes: 1

Angel/Dust Neo (エンジェル/ダスト neo, Enjyeru/Dasuto neo) is a Japanese manga created by Aoi Nanase and the sequel to Angel/Dust. In this manga, Aoi Nanase revisits the elements of her earlier manga to craft a new story of the harem genre. It was originally serialized in Newtype, and the collected volume was released on November 1, 2003. ADV Manga has licensed this manga for publication in English. It was also serialized in Newtype USA and the English version of the collected volume was released in January 2007.

== Story ==
Akito Haga, a junior at Takashiro High School, prays each day at a neighborhood shrine for direction in his life. One day, however, he changes his prayers and pleads to "just give me anything". Suddenly, a girl with angel wings falls from the sky and collides with him. The girl, later named Marino, suffers from amnesia and is looked after by the shrine's priest. Confused by this, Akito leaves the shrine when he literally collides into yet another mysterious girl, Musia, on the stairway. She claims to be an emulate and wants to enter into a contract with him.

An emulate, as explained by Musia, is a computer. As the abilities of computers increased they developed a severe heat dissipation problem. The problem was solved by constructing the computer of biological materials.

If things couldn't get more out of hand in Akito's world, a few days later he and Musia run into yet another emulate, Leia, who also demands a contract with him. A fight between Leia and Musia over Akito ensues but is stopped when he declares that he'll decide between the two girls. They declare a truce and move into his home to await his decision.

The story revolves around Akito and the Emulates that have entered into his life.

== Characters ==
Akito Haga
A high school junior. He goes to the shrine to pray often, but he doesn't know what to do with his life. He lives with his older, chain-smoking sister. Later, he seems to develop feelings for Marino.

Marino (Shirakawa)
The first Emulate that Akito encounters. However, her memories are sealed away and thus doesn't remember trying to make a contract with Akito. She is adopted by the priest of the shrine she was found and starts working as a priestess. The priest gives her the family name "Shirakawa" and a little later enrolls her in high school. She winds up in the same class as Akito.

Musia (Haga)
The second Emulate that appears in the story. She estimates that she is from this planet, but from about 3,000 years in the future. Her rank is "Angel" and she looks (and acts) like a little girl. She can also be hard-edged. She is very helpful, but sometimes her eagerness causes problems. Early on, one morning out of boredom, she and Leia enroll themselves in Akito's High School class, using the family-name "Haga". She is especially fond of Akito and becomes jealous whenever another girl shows interest in him.

Leia (Haga)
The third and final Emulate that enters Akito's life. Her rank is "Virtue" and unlike Musia, she has a mature appearance and is calm and collected and a bit hard-edged. However, she is ignorant of normal human behaviors. She is also fond of Akito and is openly jealous of Marino. Neither Leia nor Musia know where they are relative to where they came from, or why they are here. Leia comments that the DNA here is too similar to the DNA where she came from for this to be a different planet.
