= Reki Kawahara =

Japanese light novel author (born 1974)

- 川原 礫
- Born: August 17, 1974 (age 52); Takasaki, Gunma, Japan
- Occupation: Novelist
- Writing career
- Genres: Science fiction; science fantasy; adventure
- Notable works: Sword Art Online; Accel World

Reki Kawahara (川原 礫, Kawahara Reki; born August 18, 1974) is a Japanese novelist. He is best known as the creator of Sword Art Online and Accel World, both of which have been adapted into anime series. He has been described as one of the most successful writers of light novels in the 2010s.

== Career ==
Kawahara wrote the first volume of Sword Art Online in 2001 as a competition entry for the 2002 ASCII Media Works Dengeki Game Novel Prize (電撃ゲーム小説大賞, Dengeki Game Shōsetsu Taishō; now Dengeki Novel Prize), but refrained from submitting it as he had exceeded the page limit; he instead published it as a web novel under the pen name Fumio Kunori (九里史生, Kunori Fumio). Over time, he wrote more main arcs and side stories, which were later updated for light novel publication.

The Isolator was serialized online starting in 2004, and began publishing in print in June 2014. 5 light novel volumes have been released as of August 2024.

Kawahara entered the first Accel World novel into ASCII Media Works' 15th Dengeki Novel Prize in 2008 and the novel won the Grand Prize. The first novel was published by ASCII Media Works on February 10, 2009 under their Dengeki Bunko imprint. As of March 8, 2024, 27 volumes have been published. An anime series debuted in April 2012.

After gaining fame from the Dengeki award, Kawahara republished Sword Art Online in print. 28 volumes have been published as of August 2024, as well as 8 volumes of Sword Art Online: Progressive. An anime series premiered in July 2012, and was followed by a for-TV movie Sword Art Online Extra Edition on December 31, 2013, a second anime series, Sword Art Online II, in July 2014, an original theatrical film, Sword Art Online The Movie: Ordinal Scale, in February 2017, and the third anime series, Sword Art Online: Alicization, in October 2018. Sword Art Online: Progressive was given an anime film adaptation in the form of Sword Art Online Progressive: Aria of a Starless Night, released in Japan on October 30, 2021. A second Progressive film was released in October 2022.

In 2022, Kawahara started publishing a new light novel series, titled Demons' Crest, with illustrations by Yukiko Horiguchi.

== Inspirations ==
Reki Kawahara has many inspirations growing up, from reading manga to online games. Reki Kawahara also stated in a Q&A session between the author Reki Kawahara and Heathcliff (Akihiko Kayaba) in 2005: "If I were to ask for you to mention one of the games you like best, which would it be?", Reki Kawahara stated the following "If you mean aside from SAO, it would be Wizardry, a game from long ago. I acquired a lot of inspiration from it".

== Works ==
=== Web novels ===
- Sword Art Online (2002)
- Absolute Solitude (2004)
- Transcendent Accelerated Burst Linker (2007)

=== Light novels ===
- Accel World (2009)
- Sword Art Online (2009)
- Sword Art Online: Progressive (2012)
- The Isolator: Realization of Absolute Solitude (2014)
- Sword Art Online Alternative: Gun Gale Online (2014) - supervision
- Sword Art Online Alternative: Clover's Regret (2016) - supervision
- Demons' Crest (2022)
- Sword Art Online Alternative: Gourmet Seekers (2023) - supervision
- Sword Art Online Alternative: Mystery Labyrinth (2023) - supervision
- Sword Art Online Alternative: Gambler's Honor (2026) - supervision
- Sword Art Online: Material (2026)

=== Films ===
- Sword Art Online: Extra Edition (2013) - screenplay
- Accel World: Infinite Burst (2016) - screenplay
- Sword Art Online the Movie: Ordinal Scale (2017) - screenplay
- Sword Art Online the Movie Progressive: Aria of a Starless Night (2021) - story
- Sword Art Online the Movie Progressive: Scherzo of Deep Night (2022) - story
- Sword Art Online the Movie: Integral Domain (2028) - story
