= Asuna (Sword Art Online) =

Main heroine in Sword Art Online

Asuna Yuuki
- Sword Art Online character
- Asuna, as she appears in Sword Art Online
- First appearance: Novel; Volume 1, Chapter 5 Progressive Volume 1, Aria of a Starless Night, Part 1 (Chronological): Manga; Aincrad Manga Stage.001 Progressive Manga Chapter 001 (Chronological): Anime; Episode 01 (Cameo) Episode 02 (Actual): Game; Infinity Moment
- Created by: Reki Kawahara
- Voiced by: Haruka Tomatsu (Japanese); Cherami Leigh (English)

In-universe information
- Race: Human (real world); Undine (ALO)
- Gender: Female
- Family: Shouzou Yuuki (father); Kyouko Yuuki (mother); Kouichirou Yuuki (older brother)
- Spouse: Kirito (partner/future husband)
- Nationality: Japanese

Asuna Yuuki (Japanese: 結城 明日奈, Hepburn: Yūki Asuna) is a fictional character in the Sword Art Online series of light novels by Reki Kawahara. She is mononymously more commonly known as simply Asuna (アスナ), her player name in the eponymous video game, which the novels are set in. Asuna appears as the lover of Kirito; as well as the female protagonist, and is in the sub-leader of the Knights of the Blood (血盟騎士団, Ketsumei Kishidan; lit. 'Knights of the Blood Oath') guild, notable for being the strongest guild in Aincrad. She is also depicted as having earned a reputation as a skilled player in-game, giving her the nickname Flash (閃光, Senkō), which, coupled with her physical attractiveness, have made her well-known and sought after by other players.

Both Asuna and Kirito have become popular characters in anime and manga fandom, frequently appearing on lists of the most popular anime characters. Additionally, Asuna has featured in numerous official Sword Art Online merchandise, and has been the subject of mixed to mostly positive critical reception, with focus on her relationship with Kirito, attractiveness, and role in the series.

== Creation and conception ==
Left: Asuna's rapier "Lambent Light" as shown in the TV series Right: Baguette Official character design by abec for the light novels

In an interview with series creator Reki Kawahara, the author noted that the female characters in Sword Art Online were not based on anyone he knew in the real world, with him stating "I don't usually make a character, setting, or anything before I start writing. As I write the story, the girls become what they are now. So, somehow, I don't know exactly, but somehow, my subliminal idea or some hidden emotion creates the characters to be strong and capable." Kawahara also added that he wrote the series to demonstrate that he views online gaming not as a social ill or escape from real life, and thus decided to show games in a more positive light in his light novels. In another interview with Anime News Network, interviewer Lynzee Loveridge noted that Asuna is a "very strong, capable female character", likening her to Genji's mother in The Tale of Genji, to which Kawahara agreed.

At Sakura-Con 2013, Kawahara noted that "the character of Asuna I might have created a little too perfectly for Sword Art Online. When teamed up with Kirito, there were hardly any problems the two as a pair could not overcome", in response to whether Asuna was a "tricky character" to develop. In an interview with Haruka Tomatsu, Asuna's voice actor, she said that "rather than having something similar to her, I feel that to me, she is the ideal person that I would want to become. After all, she can cook, she's smart... I think that she's the type of woman I wanted to become and admired. Leaving aside if I can cook well, though, I really like to cook. I don't really know if I can say if we are alike because of that, though."

=== Abilities ===
Lambent Light (ランベントライト, Ranbento Raito) is Asuna's signature one-handed rapier. She continued to use it as her main weapon of choice until the fateful battle on the 75th Floor. Kirito used this rapier to stab and defeat Heathcliff in the final battle, thus clearing the game. Her rapier, combined with her speed, earned her the nickname "Lightning Flash."

== Appearances ==
=== Sword Art Online ===
Asuna was the sub-leader of the Knights of the Blood (血盟騎士団, Ketsumei Kishidan; lit. 'Knights of the Blood Oath'), a medium-sized guild acknowledged as the strongest guild in Aincrad. Being one of the few women that play SAO and extremely attractive, she received many invitations and proposals. She is also a strong-willed, and an accomplished player known in-game as The Flash (閃光, Senkō) for her extraordinary fast skills with the rapier. Later, she falls in love with Kirito and they marry in-game after saving him from being killed by Kuradeel. Towards the end of SAO, she saves Kirito from a killing blow by Heathcliff at the cost of her life. However, her death was only in-game and she is reunited with Kirito and freed alongside him and the 6,147 surviving players from the game shortly after the death of Heathcliff.

=== Fairy Dance ===
Despite the completion of SAO, Asuna remained unconscious and was instead detained in another VRMMORPG cyberspace called Alfheim Online. She was forced to play the role of Titania (ティターニア, Titānia) the Queen of Fairies, with Nobuyuki Sugou, who imprisoned her and played as Oberon (オベイロン, Obeiron) the Fairy King. This was done so that he could marry Asuna in the real world, while she was unconscious, and take over RECT Inc., her father's company. She attempted to escape the World Tree and managed to steal a GM card, but was caught and sent back to her cage after two slime guards verified that she was the captive. When Yui's voice was heard, she threw the card down to her. Upon being released, she created two avatars for Alfheim, Asuna (as an Undine) and Erika (エリカ, Erika) (as a Sylph), and went on to continue living together with Kirito. She enrolled at the SAO Survivor School with Kazuto Kirigaya in the real world after everything ended. In the real world, her parents wanted her to follow in their footsteps. However, after living in SAO and meeting Kirito, she gained a different perspective and looked back on her past with disgust. She officially became Kazuto's real-life girlfriend and dreamed of marrying him and having a family with him in the future.

=== Alicization ===
Asuna was also a major character in Alicization. After Kirito disappeared off the grid after Johnny Black's attack in the real world, she discovered the existence of the Ocean Turtle (オーシャン・タートル, Ōshan Tātoru) and requested the help of Rinko Koujiro, who helped her get on board and convinced Seijirou Kikuoka to let her stay. When the Dark Territory began their attack, Asuna logged into the Underworld under the super account Stacia (ステイシア, Suteishia), the Goddess of Creation.

=== Other appearances ===
In Sword Art Online Abridged (SAO Abridged), an abridged fandub/re-adaptation of the anime by American animation studio Something Witty Entertainment, which as of 2024 has run for two seasons, Asuna is voiced by Carrie Johnston. Using original animated sequences and dialogue, in SAO Abridged, Asuna is given additional storylines, including having initially been a noob on joining SAO, and further fleshing out her relationship with Kirito and escape from Sugou.

== Reception ==
=== Critical commentary ===
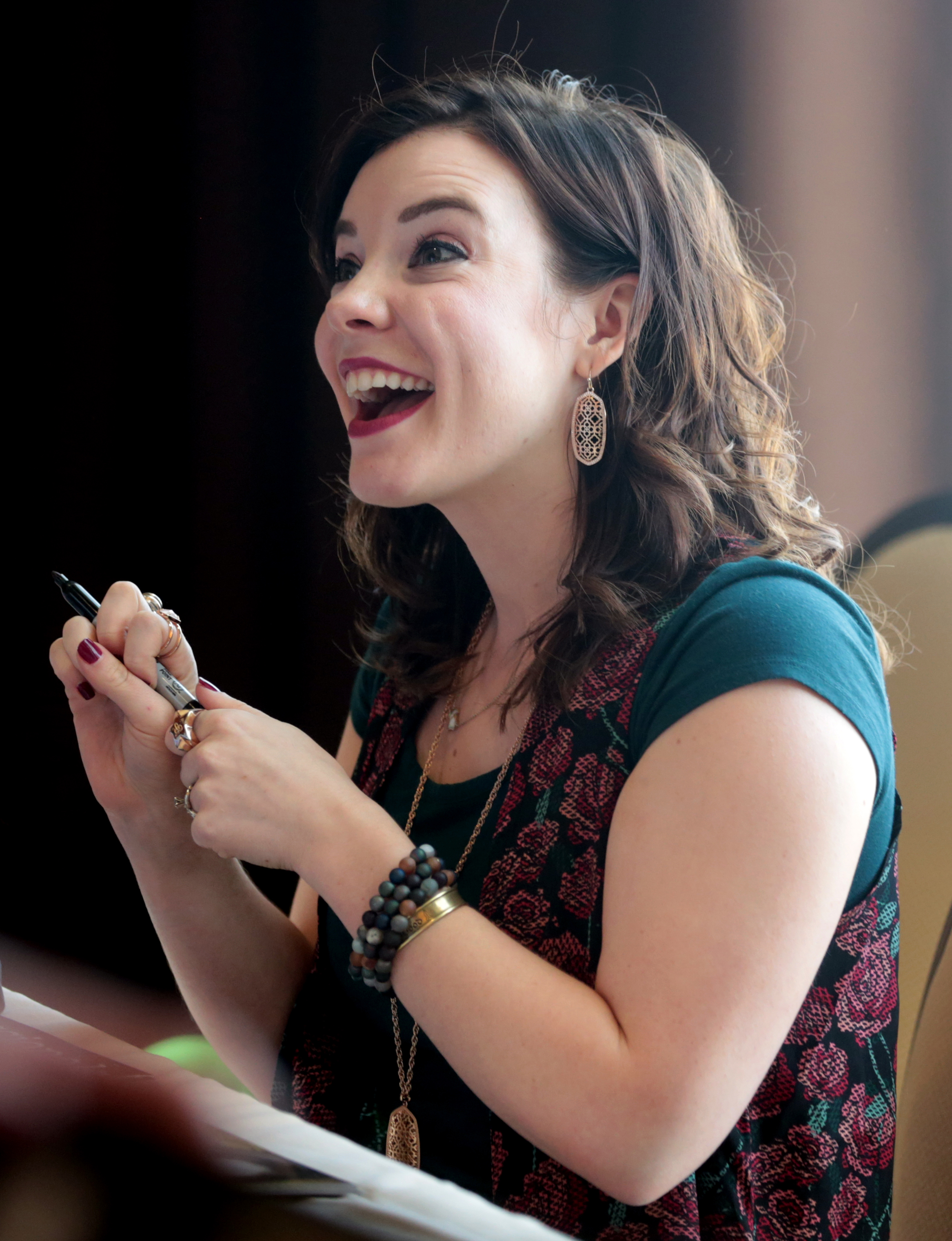
Cherami Leigh has received praise for her performance as Asuna in the English dub.

Asuna finds that she feels more at home in the recreated Sword Art Online than in the real world. For two years in the online world, she was a warrior in charge of her own destiny and helped lead others in their fight for freedom. In the real world she's the heiress to a rich and distinguished family full of CEOs and politicians and is thus expected to go to the best schools, get the best grades, get a highly respected job, and marry an influential high-society man – her whole life has been planned out for her since birth. There is no room in the plan for spending time in an online game with her friends, going to a non-top tier school, or loving a normal boy. Much of [...] Asuna's struggle with who she is and who she wants to be as she is pitted against her overbearing, intolerant mother at home.

— Richard Eisenbeis, Kotaku

In a review, Richard Eisenbeis of Kotaku hailed Sword Art Online as the smartest series in recent years; Eisenbeis particularly noted how the romance between Kirito and Asuna is explored bringing "definition to exactly what love is like in a virtual world." However, in the second half of the novels, criticism was levied at the aspect of turning Asuna into a damsel in distress trope, stating that a strong female lead was "reduced to nothing but the quest item the male lead is hunting for." Eisenbeis further complained that "in the first arc of Sword Art Online, Asuna was a strong fighter and one of the leaders who thousands depended on to get them through the death game alive. In the second arc, she was powerless, locked in a literal bird cage and molested by her captor while waiting for her hero to rescue her. In Gun Gale Online, she was little more than a spectator cheering on her man. And even in Calibre, she was just another member of the ensemble cast."

Responding to this criticism, Karen Mead of Japanator.com disagreed, writing that "in Asuna's case, her actions are instrumental to her own rescue; if she hadn't broken out of her cell and gone exploring late in the show, Kirito wouldn't have gotten the card he needed to get to where she was and rescue her", thus invalidating her role as a damsel in distress technically, though the criticism itself was still seen as valid. The claim that Kirito serves as a "Gary Stu" type character was also contested, citing his relationship with Asuna. Nevertheless, Eisenbeis praised the fourth arc of Sword Art Online as it focuses primarily on Asuna's point of view – an "excellent choice" in his opinion, as it "allows Asuna, who suddenly went from strong female lead to weak damsel in distress in the series' second arc, to once again come into her own and develop as a character." The arc as a whole was called "both heartbreaking and beautiful."

=== Popularity ===
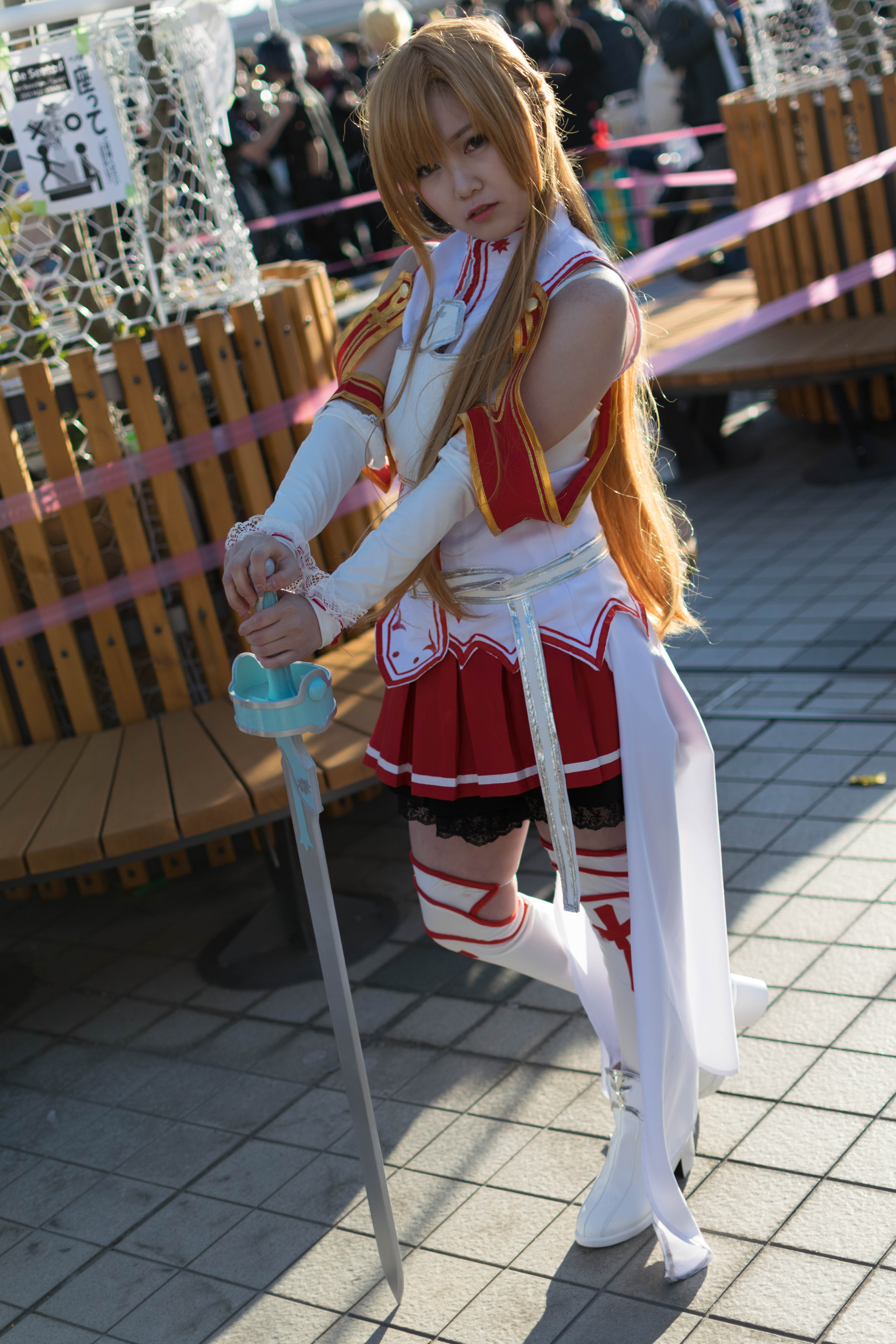
The popularity of the character has made her a popular subject of cosplay.

Asuna is one of the most popular characters in Sword Art Online. In a fan poll by anime website Charapedia, 10,000 respondents voted on their favourite couples in anime, with Asuna and Kirito topping the list. Kirito's confession to Asuna also placed third in a list of the top twenty "anime and manga love confessions" by the same website. A third Charapedia poll, which asked fans to list their favourite "cool" women in anime, had Asuna placed second with 525 votes. A fourth, which users listed the "top 20 female anime/manga characters not to provoke", had Asuna listed in third place. A fifth, where respondents ranked the "top 30 [anime] characters they'd like to work for", had Kirito placed twenty-ninth and Asuna twenty-sixth. Yet in another Charapedia poll, "Asuna" was first on a list of the "top 20 anime characters Japanese fans would name their children after"; "Kazuto" (Kirito) placed fourth. A Chinese website, Bilibili, took a reader poll to find the most "moe" characters of 2015; Asuna winning the female third place and Kirito listed in the male top 8. Asuna and Kirito were awarded first and second respectively in a character poll by Dengeki Bunko (the publisher of Sword Art Online) for their light novels. Additionally, Asuna scored first place in a Tokyo Otaku Mode survey where users polled which anime characters they most want to date, where 2,845 respondents from 100 countries participated.

Kirito and Asuna again made a list of the "[Top] 7 Couples Who Make Love and War" by Anime News Network, writing "love blossoms on the virtual battlefield and the two wed before taking on the game's creator together. Otamart, a popular Japanese app that specializes in anime, manga and idol products, polled users in which characters look best in swimsuits and yukatas, with Asuna placing 13th (for swimsuits) and 15th (for yukatas) respectively. Another Otamart poll asking users to rank the anime characters they would want to give chocolates to for Valentine's Day had Asuna placed both 10th on characters men wish to give chocolates to and men wish to receive chocolates from. The August 2014 issue of Newtype published results of a recent character popularity poll, with Asuna placing 4th for all female characters (Kirito placed 1st in the male character category). Asuna was ranked the eighth "Top 25 Hottest Anime Babes [of] 2013." Italian restaurant La Ricetta in Zama, Kanagawa features pancakes prepared with anime and video game character art, including Kirito and Asuna.

=== Merchandise ===
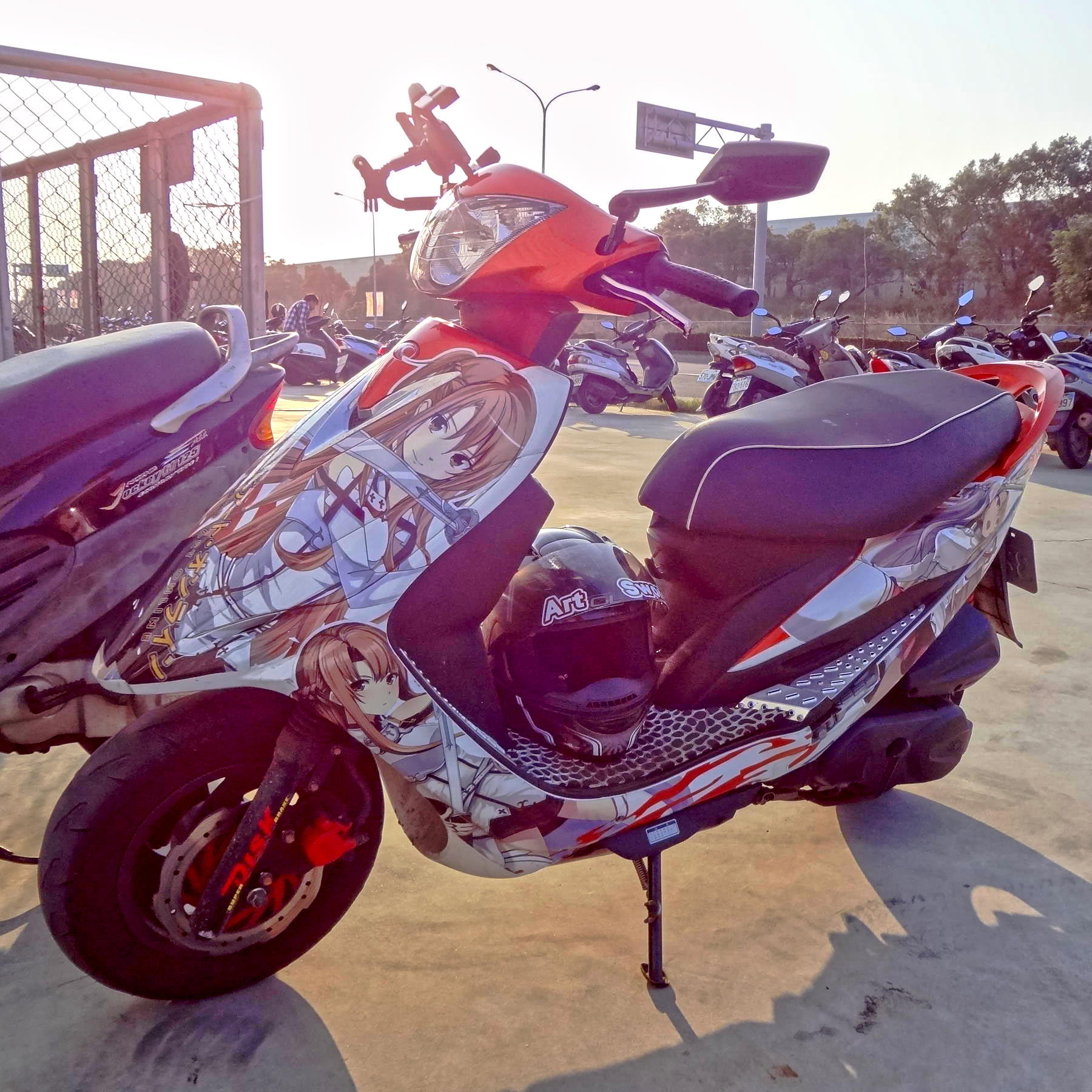
An Asuna itasha in Taichung, Taiwan

The character has received positive critical reception, and her popularity has led to her being featured in several promotional efforts or merchandise of the series. This includes two swimsuit figures of Asuna and Leafa, another character from Sword Art Online. There is also a "cooking version" figurine of Asuna, which released in May 2016. She also features in promotional advertisements for a series of Umaibo puffed corn snacks by Namco. An interactive digital assistant app titled "Wake Me Up Asuna", in which Asuna provides the user with information such as wake-up calls, current weather, fortune, and appointments, was released in June 2015 in Japan, followed by an international release in English. In the app, Asuna herself appears in multiple costumes, including her Knights of the Blood uniform and a yellow sweater. The app itself is free though users have to pay for English voice recognition and subtitles.

Sword Art Online girls (including Asuna) feature in a merchandise lottery by Bandai, with Anime News Network humorously noting that "the girls of Sword Art Online have brought in a pretty penny for the franchise's creators, whether the characters are lounging under parasols or starring in their own manga spin-off." Replicas of Asuna's "Wind Fleuret" and Kirito's "Elucidator" rapiers have been built. There are also Kirito, Asuna, and Sinon Sword Art Online-branded perfumes for sale; "Asuna" is described as " a sweet, irresistibly refreshing scent of galbanum and jasmine." Sword Art Online glasses based on the characters had a "Fairy Dance Asuna" model "inspired by [her] time in Yggdrasil, the World Tree", and "these glasses have pale pink frames with a red ribbon and flowing hair depicted on each arm." There are also earphone jack figures of Asuna (in both regular and Titania versions), Leafa, and Suguha. Asuna has featured in several Sword Art Online-related video games. This includes Dengeki Bunko: Fighting Climax, in which several characters appearing under the Dengeki Bunko imprint are featured. Asuna, Kirito and Leafa appeared in a campaign by the "Manga Anime Guardians" project in combating anime and manga piracy, with the project being supported by 15 anime production studios and manga publishers. There are also 3D light-up LED models of Kirito, Asuna, Sinon, Leafa, and Yuuki.
