= Kirito (Sword Art Online) =

Fictional character in Sword Art Online

- Sword Art Online character
- Kirito, as he appears in Sword Art Online
- First appearance: Sword Art Online 1: Aincrad (2009)
- Created by: Reki Kawahara
- Voiced by: Yoshitsugu Matsuoka (Japanese); Bryce Papenbrook (English)

In-universe information
- Race: ALO: Spriggan
- Spouse: Asuna Yuuki (partner/future wife)

Kazuto Kirigaya (桐ヶ谷 和人, Kirigaya Kazuto), born as Kazuto Narusaka (鳴坂 和人, Narusaka Kazuto), is the main protagonist of the Sword Art Online series of light novels written by Reki Kawahara. Known by a portmanteau of his name, Kirito (キリト, Kirito) is his user name in the Sword Art Online video game, which the series is partially set in.

Kirito is a teenager who was chosen as one of 1,000 beta testers for a virtual reality massively multiplayer online role-playing game (VRMMORPG) for the NerveGear: Sword Art Online. After the game is released to the general public, he and the rest of the 10,000 players discover that they are unable to log out and are trapped in the simulation unless they manage to beat the game. In the anime adaptation, Kirito is voiced in Japanese by Yoshitsugu Matsuoka and in English by Bryce Papenbrook.

== Creation and conception ==
Character design by abec for the light novels, which include his dual swords, Elucidator and Dark Repulser

In an interview with Sword Art Online series creator Reki Kawahara, he wrote the series to change popular opinion of online gaming; viewing it not a social ill or just an escape from real life, and thus decided to show games in a more positive light in his light novels. He stated that he does not usually put aspects of himself into his characters, he did note that "neither of us are good at forming parties. We [both] tend to play solo in these games a lot." When asked about Kirito using a sword in a gun-based game during the Gun Gale Online arc, Kawahara responded that the energy sword in Halo can be the most powerful weapon if used properly.

In the anime adaptation, Kirito is voiced in Japanese by Yoshitsugu Matsuoka and in English by Bryce Papenbrook. In an interview with Matsuoka on the similarities between him and his character, Matsuoka opinioned that "there's only one chance" for success in both acting and for Kirito in the game universe. He also noted that he wanted to be a good example through his acting.

== Appearances ==
=== Sword Art Online ===
Kazuto "Kirito" Kirigaya was one of 1,000 testers in the previous closed beta of Sword Art Online (SAO), a virtual reality massively multiplayer online role-playing game (VRMMORPG) played with a VR headset, known as the NerveGear. The helmet stimulates the user's five senses via their brain, allowing players to experience and control their in-game characters with their minds. He later joins the official version of the game where he becomes one of the 10,000 players to log into the game on its opening. The players only discover that they are unable to log out and are trapped in the game. Akihiko Kayaba, the game's creator, appears and tells the players that they must beat the game to escape. Aincrad, a steel castle and the setting of SAO, has 100 floors that need to be climbed and completed to finish the game. Those who suffer in-game deaths or forcibly remove the NerveGear will suffer real-life deaths.

During the start of SAO, he befriended a girl named Asuna Yuuki. During the 1st Floor Boss raid, as Illfang the Kobold Lord's weaponry and attack patterns differed from the beta, and while the raid party relied on a published beta test version of information about it by the information broker Argo, Diavel was killed by the boss while attempting to obtain the Last Attack bonus, though Kirito and Asuna finished off the boss afterwards. Because of this, the beginner players' hatred for beta testers resurfaced and threatened to go out of control. Driven to protect other beta testers from discrimination, Kirito ended the tension by falsely claiming that a majority of beta testers were inefficient and incapable players, while only a select few of them were skilled like himself and withholding important information from normal players in order to hoard the best resources in the death game. This resulted in all of the beginner players' hatred and rage being directed at him rather than all beta testers, as well as the creation of the player category Beater (ビーター, Bītā) (a portmanteau of "Beta Tester" and "Cheater"). For being the first player to defeat the 1st Floor Boss, Kirito received the Coat of Midnight (コート・オブ・ミッドナイト, Kōto Obu Middonaito), a black leather trench coat that becomes his trademark appearance for the rest of the series.

Kirito remained a solo player for the majority of the game, isolating himself from greater groups, bearing the "Beater" role to prevent other former beta testers from being discriminated, and actively taking part in Boss battles as one of the Clearers (攻略組, Kōryaku Gumi; lit. 'Capture group'). At some point in 2023, he met Sachi and her guild, the Moonlit Black Cats (月夜の黒猫団, Tsukiyo no Kuroneko-dan), after helping them safely escape a dangerous dungeon and joined them, but he kept his level a secret from them. One day, when the guild's leader Keita left to buy their guild base, the rest of the guild went off to hunt for treasure but ended up being trapped in an Anti-Crystal Area somewhere in a Labyrinth on a higher floor and killed by monsters, except for Kirito, who wallowed in his despair and returned to being a solo player until he read the time delayed message Sachi left for him on Christmas Eve, urging him to survive.

On February 2024, Kirito befriended a girl named Silica and helped her revive Pina, her pet Feathered Little Dragon (フェザーリドラ, Fezā Ridora). On June 2024, Kirito met a blacksmith named Lisbeth, who forged a new sword for him after he unlocked a unique skill: Dual Blades (二刀流, Nitōryū; lit. 'Two Sword Style'), although he kept it hidden to avoid attention. However, he was forced to reveal it during the 74th Floor Boss fight in order to save the people nearby as they were unable to leave by teleport crystal and defeat the boss. He was forced to join the Knights of the Blood (血盟騎士団, Ketsumei Kishidan; lit. 'Knights of the Blood Oath') after the revelation of his skill and he accepted the duel against and lost to Heathcliff, the guild's leader, for allowing Asuna to go with him. Later, he realizes he is in love with Asuna, who returns his feelings, and they marry in-game. On November 2024, Kirito exposed Heathcliff as Kayaba after the 75th Floor Boss was defeated and faced him in a one-on-one duel with a condition; allowing every player to log out if Kirito wins. In the end, Kirito managed to defeat Heathcliff and freed himself, Asuna, and the 6,147 surviving players from the game.

Despite the completion of SAO, Kazuto discovers in the real world that 300 SAO players, including Asuna, remain trapped in their NerveGears. As he goes to the hospital to see Asuna, he meets her father, Shouzou Yuuki, who is asked by an associate of his, Nobuyuki Sugou, to make a decision, which Sugou later reveals to be his marriage to Asuna, angering Kazuto. Several hours later, he is informed by Agil, another SAO survivor, that a figure similar to Asuna was spotted on "The World Tree" in another VRMMORPG cyberspace called Alfheim Online (ALO). Assisted in-game by his cousin Suguha "Leafa" Kirigaya and Yui, a navigation pixie (originally an AI from SAO), he quickly learns that the trapped players in ALO are part of a plan conceived by Sugou to perform illegal experiments on their minds, with his main goal being to create the perfect mind-control for financial gain and to subjugate Asuna, whom he intends to marry in the real world, in order to assume control of her family's corporation. Kirito eventually stops the experiment and rescues the remaining 300 players, foiling Sugou's plans. Before leaving ALO to see Asuna, Kayaba, who has uploaded his mind to the Internet using an experimental and destructively high-power version of the NerveGear at the cost of his life, entrusts Kirito with The Seed – a package program designed to create virtual worlds. Kazuto eventually reunites with Asuna in the real world, and The Seed is released onto the Internet, reviving Aincrad as other VRMMORPGs begin to thrive.

=== Gun Gale Online ===
Several months later, at the prompting of a government official named Seijirou Kikuoka, Kazuto is recruited to investigate a series of murders involving another VRMMORPG called Gun Gale Online (GGO), the AmuSphere (the successor of the NerveGear), and a serial killer known as Death Gun. Aided by a female player named Shino "Sinon" Asada, he participates in a gunfight tournament called the Bullet of Bullets (BoB) and discovers the truth behind the murders, which originated with Death Gun being a former member of the player-killing guild Laughing Coffin (笑う棺桶, Rafin Kofin) in SAO. Through his and Sinon's efforts, they won against Death Gun in a battle and two suspects are captured, though the third suspect, Atsushi Kanamoto (otherwise known as Johnny Black (ジョニー・ブラック, Jonī Burakku)), escapes.

=== Alicization ===
Kazuto is later recruited to assist in testing an experimental FullDive machine, Soul Translator (STL), which has an interface that is far more realistic and complex than the previous machine he had played to help develop an artificial intelligence for the Ministry of Defense (MOD) named A.L.I.C.E. He tests the STL by entering a virtual reality cyberspace created with The Seed package, named UnderWorld (UW). In the UW, the flow of time proceeds a thousand times faster than in the real world, and Kirito's memories of what happens inside are restricted. However, Black injures Kazuto with suxamethonium chloride. The MOD recovers Kazuto and places him back into the STL to preserve his mind while attempts are made to save him. Meanwhile, it is revealed that UnderWorld was created as part of an experiment to create artificial intelligence that could be used for military purposes.

=== Other appearances ===
In Sword Art Online Abridged (SAO Abridged), an abridged fandub/re-adaptation of the anime by Canadian animation studio Something Witty Entertainment, which as of 2024 has run for two seasons, Kirito is voiced by Matthew J. Kok. Using original animated sequences and dialogue, in SAO Abridged, Kirito is given additional storylines including post-traumatic stress disorder as a result of the death of his original team before the first floor of SAO was cleared.

Kirito makes a cameo appearance in the eighth episode of the anime series Eromanga Sensei, with Yoshitsugu Matsuoka reprising his role.

== Reception ==
=== Critical commentary ===
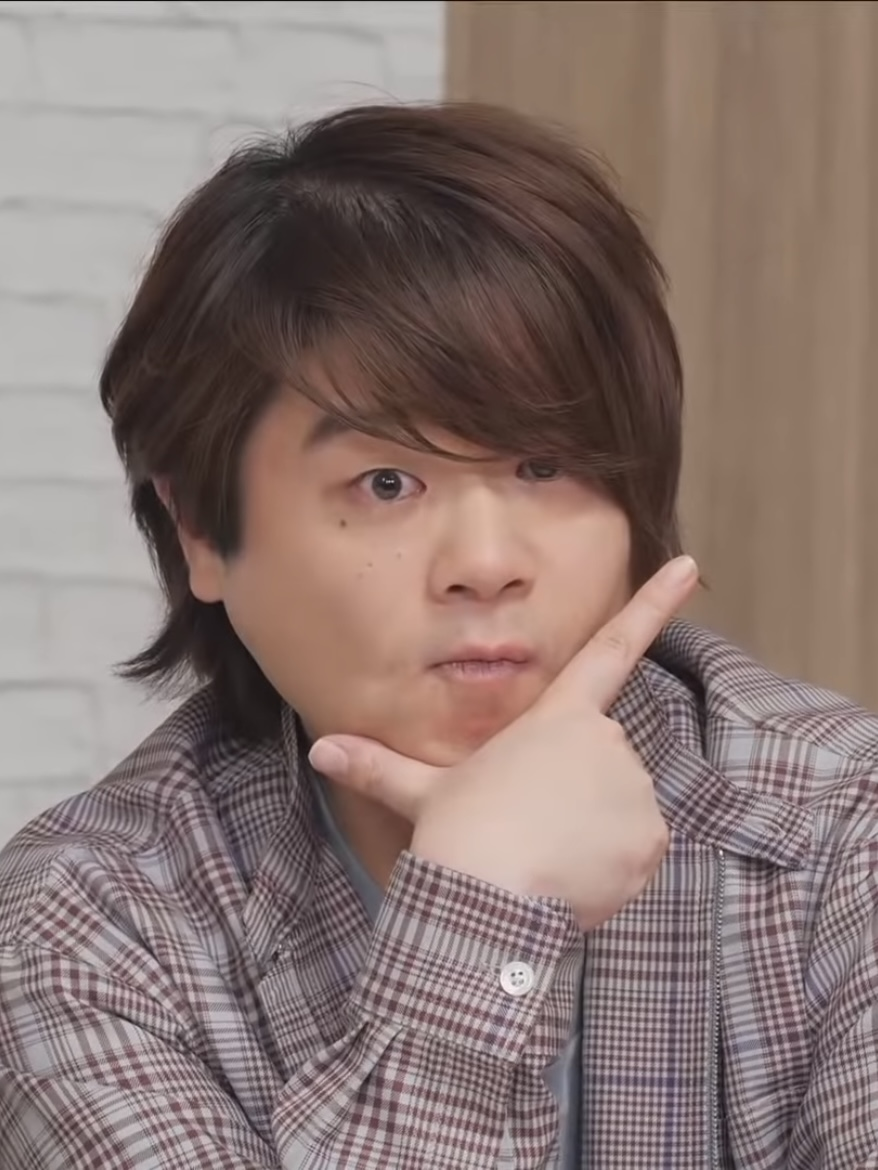
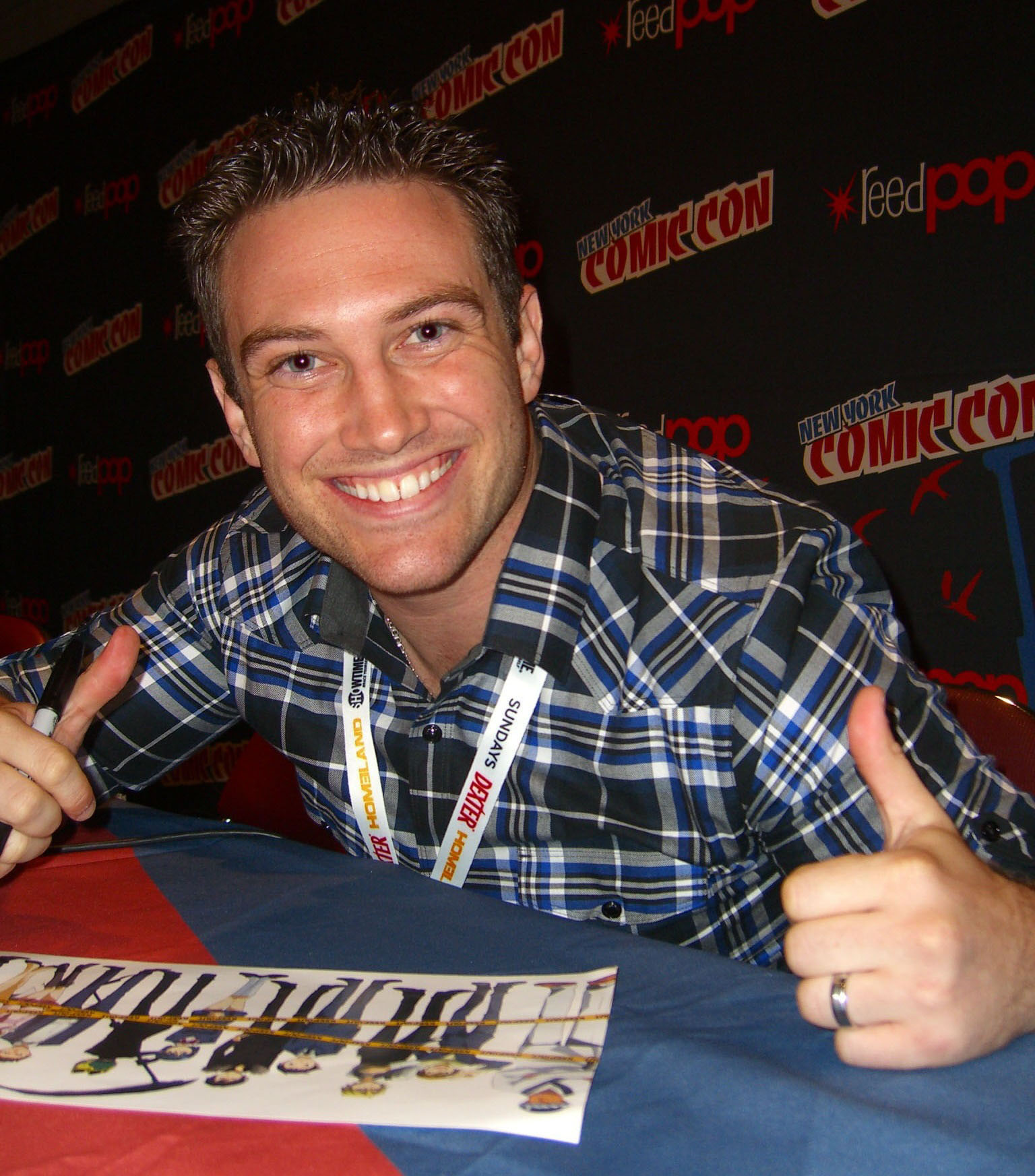
The performances of Yoshitsugu Matsuoka (left) and Bryce Papenbrook (right), the respective Japanese and English voices of Kirito, has received praise.

Usually, the complaint with male characters who have all the girls falling for them in anime is that the character does nothing to earn it; the girls just fall for him because it's in the script. In Kirito's case, he's extremely skilled at the game and actively uses his skills to help people weaker than him ... in other words, the girls who like him have actual legit reasons for liking him.

You can say that Kirito is too competent and noble and it strains credulity, or you can say that the girls on this show are dumb for liking him, but not both. The idea that the girls like a guy who is competent and also nice paints them as good judges of character, versus mindless objects who like a character for no apparent reason.

— Karen Mead, Japanator.com

In a review, Richard Eisenbeis of Kotaku hailed Sword Art Online as the smartest series in recent years; Eisenbeis particularly noted how the romance between Kirito and Asuna is explored bringing "definition to exactly what love is like in a virtual world." However, the two characters' relationship in the second half of the novels was criticized, with Eisenbeis complaining about Asuna being deregulated to a damsel in distress stock character for Kirito to fight for, lamenting that the "strong female lead" had been "reduced to nothing but the quest item the male lead is hunting for." The love triangle between Kirito and the other female characters was also scrutinized; Eisenbeis considered it "ludicrous" that Kirito would consider abandoning Asuna, especially considering his devotion to her in the previous storyline. Nevertheless, Kirito was considered a likable and "fun" character.

In response to criticism directed at the series that Kirito was a "Mary Sue" type character, Karen Mead of Japanator.com wrote that "I don't think we ever see enough of Kirito's weaknesses to balance out his strengths: he's pretty much a genius at video games, as well as a kind, giving person, and those are some pretty major positives." However, she praised the positive aspects of Kirito's character, and his "competent and noble" self distinguishes him from other harem protagonists in that he actually earns the girls' affection. Carly Smith of The Escapist criticized Sword Art Online II and compared it unfavourably to the original storyline, summarizing "welcome to Sword Art Online II: the show where everyone loves Kirito and nothing matters", and that the anime doesn't "start to shine" until "Kirito is pushed to the sidelines".

In an interview with Bryce Papenbrook, Kirito's English voice actor, when asked whether he would pick Kirito or Eren Yeager (whom he also voiced) from Attack on Titan in a fight, Papenbrook joked that "Inside a game, obviously Kirito would win, because he has God Mode running at all times. I think in real life, Kirito is strong-willed and passionate, but I think Eren would slice him up in real life. He's just too crazy."

=== Popularity ===
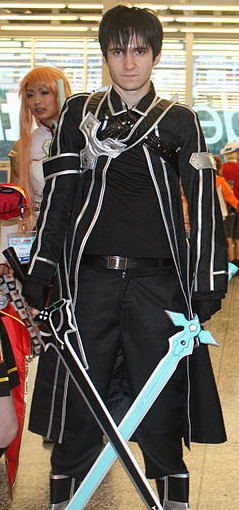
The popularity of the character has made him a popular subject of cosplay.

Kirito is one of the most popular characters in Sword Art Online. In a poll by anime website Charapedia, 10,000 respondents voted on their favorite couples in anime, with Kirito and Asuna topping the list. Additionally, a Chinese website, bilibili, took a reader poll to find the most "moe" characters of 2015; Kirito placed sixth in the male top 8 and Asuna third in the female top 8. Asuna and Kirito were awarded first and second respectively in a character poll by Dengeki Bunko (the publisher of Sword Art Online) for their light novels. Asuna and Kirito once again made a list of the "[Top] 7 Couples Who Make Love and War" by Anime News Network, writing "love blossoms on the virtual battlefield and the two wed before taking on the game's creator together. The August 2014 issue of Newtype published results of a recent character popularity poll, with Kirito placing 1st overall for male characters; Asuna placed 4th for all female characters. Another poll which would decide the characters placed on a Sword Art Online artbook had Kirito placed in fourth place. "Kazuto" (Kirito) was also fourth on a list of the "top 20 anime characters Japanese fans would name their children after"; "Asuna" placed first. Italian restaurant La Ricetta in Zama, Kanagawa features pancakes prepared with anime and video game character art, including Kirito and Asuna.

=== Merchandise ===
The character has received positive critical reception, and his popularity has led to him being featured in several promotional efforts and merchandise of the series. Kirito makes an appearance in an April 2015 campaign which promotes Namco gaming arcades. Fan-made replicas of Asuna's "Lambent Light" and Kirito's "Elucidator" rapiers have been built by the Man At Arms team of blacksmiths and craftsmen. There are also Kirito, Asuna, and Sinon Sword Art Online-branded perfumes for sale; "Kirito" is described as "dry citrus with a touch of brandy, meant to evoke a mature spirit. It uses green apple, apricot and lime above Muguet, Rose, Jasmine, grapefruit and a musk and brandy base." Sword Art Online glasses based on the characters had a "Kirito" model; "these matte black frames feature a cross and the excalibur on each arm [of the glasses]." A series of anime-inspired Christmas cards featured characters such as Rin Matsuoka from Free!, Godoka from Puella Magi Madoka Magica, and Kirito. He has also appeared in several Sword Art Online-related video games. This includes Dengeki Bunko: Fighting Climax, in which several characters appearing under the Dengeki Bunko imprint are featured. In a costume swap between video games Sword Art Online: Lost Song and God Eater 2: Rage Burst, Lost Song received a Julius costume for Kirito and an Alisa costume for Asuna whilst Rage Burst received costumes of Kirito and Sinon. Asuna, Kirito and Leafa appeared in a campaign by the "Manga Anime Guardians" project in combating anime and manga piracy, with the project being supported by 15 anime production studios and manga publishers. There are also 3D light-up LED models of Kirito, Asuna, Sinon, Leafa and Yuuki.

== See also ==
- List of Sword Art Online characters
