= List of Shadows House episodes =

Key visual for the series

Shadows House is a Japanese anime television series based on the manga series Shadows House by the manga artist duo Somato. The series was announced on the cover of the sixth volume of the manga in October 2020. The series is animated by CloverWorks and directed by Kazuki Ōhashi, with scripts written by Toshiya Ōno, character designs by Chizuko Kusakabe, and music composed by Kenichiro Suehiro. It aired from April 11 to July 4, 2021, on Tokyo MX and other channels. (Note: Tokyo MX listed the air dates for the series on Saturday at 24:30, which is effectively Sunday at 0:30 a.m. JST.) The opening song is the instrumental "A Hollow Shadow" by Suehiro, and the ending song is "Nai Nai" (ないない), is performed by Reona. The ending song for the eighth episode is the instrumental "My Perfect World" (私の完璧な世界, Watashi no Kanpeki na Sekai) by Suehiro. Funimation licensed the series outside of Asia. Following Sony's acquisition of Crunchyroll, the series was moved to Crunchyroll. In Southeast Asia, the series is licensed by Muse Communication. It was broadcast on Animax Asia in the region.

On September 11, 2021, it was announced during a livestream that a second season has been greenlit. The main cast and staff reprised their roles. It aired from July 9 to September 24, 2022. (Note: Tokyo MX listed the air dates for the series on Friday at 24:00, which is effectively Saturday at midnight JST.) The opening theme song is "Shall We Dance?" by Reona, while the ending theme song is "Masquerade" by ClariS.

== Series overview ==
Season	Episodes	Originally released	
Season	Episodes	First released	Last released
1	13	April 11, 2021	July 4, 2021
2	12	July 9, 2022	September 24, 2022

== Episodes ==
=== Season 1 (2021) ===
No. overall	No. in season	Title	Directed by	Written by	Original release date
1	1	"The Shadow and Her Doll"; Transliteration: "Shadō to Iki Ningyō" (Japanese: シャドーと生き人形)	Kazuki Ōhashi	Toshiya Ōno	April 11, 2021
A group of children consume cups of coffee-colored drinks before pledging their servitude to Shadows House and their masters or mistresses. A female Living Doll wakes up and readies herself to serve her Shadow mistress Kate Mirror, whose bedroom needs to be cleaned from being full of soot emitted by her. Throughout the day, Kate is shown to be quiet, reserved and poised, while her Living Doll appears to be optimistic, bubbly and clumsy. Initially from being around her Living Doll, Kate frequently emits soot as a sign of worry, anger or anxiety, but the two eventually warm up to each other after Kate shares bread with her Living Doll. As the day goes by, they go beyond their relationship as master and servant by playing a card game, reading letters and having tea time. Kate gives her Living Doll a makeover and christens her with the name Emilico. Excited, Emilico glances out the window and notices a grouchy-looking Living Doll who glares at her when she waves.
2	2	"Outside the Room"; Transliteration: "Heya no Soto ni wa" (Japanese: 部屋の外には)	Hayato Sakai	Momoka Toyoda	April 18, 2021
Kate informs Emilico that she will be dispatched to clean areas beyond the bedroom. Discovering the shocking existence of other Living Dolls in Shadows House, Emilico is assigned with Lou, Mia and Rosemary as part of Cleaning Squad 10 for the great hall. Upon returning to Kate's bedroom, Emilico accidentally soaks Katie's precious stuffed doll, which infuriates Kate. While Kate takes a bath, Emilico desperately tries to repair the stuffed doll. Emilico also sews a bird plushie that she names Rolly, paying homage for her fascination of bread. Emilico and Kate then reconcile. Later on, Emilico falls off a windowsill while cleaning it, landing in the courtyard below. Kate scurries to retrieve Emilico from the courtyard, only to bump into Mia and her Shadow mistress Sarah. Mia perfectly mimics the facial expressions and body language of Sarah, who chastises Emilico for being a failure as a Living Doll. After noticing that Emilico tried to protect that which she treasures, Kate instructs her to take better care of herself. Before going to bed, Emilico journals all the trivial things that she could fret about, leading her to ponder the true nature of Shadows House.
3	3	"The Soot Sickness"; Transliteration: "Susu ni Yoru Yamai" (Japanese: すすによる病)	Takashi Sakuma	Yūji Ōnishi	April 25, 2021
Reuniting with Lou, Mia and Rosemary, Emilico is given a tour of the accessible rooms for the Living Dolls. Emilico and Lou learn that Mia and Rosemary have already undergone their big debut, a ceremony where Shadows and their Living Dolls are judged on their level of competency as a sign of adulthood. An emergency bell suddenly rings, signaling an approaching Phantom, a creature amassed from a cluster of Scorches, which are piles of soot left uncleaned. As the Cleaning Squads are dispatched, Emilico and Lou witness Mia being attacked by Rosemary, whose head becomes engulfed by a Scorch. After Lou uses cleaning spray to embrittle part of the Scorch, Emilico instinctively dumps water from a flower vase at Rosemary in order to completely dispel the Scorch. However, Rosemary develops "soot sickness", temporarily rendering her incapable of proper speech and movement. While taking a bath, Emilico learns that Mia was born completely literate. Rosemary recovers from soot sickness after being treated by the First-Aid Team. In the evening, Emilico returns to Kate's bedroom, where Kate discovers her telekinetic connection to her own emitted soot, though they must keep to themselves since there is no lore about this particular soot power.
4	4	"Watchers in the Night"; Transliteration: "Shin'ya no Mimawari" (Japanese: 深夜の見回り)	Jun Takahashi	Rino Yamazaki	May 2, 2021
The grouchy-looking Living Doll, recognized as Barbie, part of an elite group called the Star Bearers, interrogates the Cleaning Squads over what caused the Phantom to appear in the first place. A male Living Doll named Shaun defends a female Living Doll named Rum, whom Barbie accuses of being the perpetrator, though Emilico rebukes Barbie for jumping to conclusions. In retaliation, Barbie assigns Emilico, Shaun and Rum on night watch duty for one week to investigate what conjured the Phantom. As the sleepless nights go by, their cleaning duties during the daytime become less efficient. On the fifth night, Shaun supplies blankets for the three of them to rest. Rum runs away upon being spooked by a Veiled Doll, a mute servant who caters for the basic needs of the Living Dolls. Emilico and Shaun stumble upon the front door, nearly evading a booby trap. When they find Rum, they discover that a trapdoor leading to the soot cellar had come loose, which caused soot to leak out and collect into Scorches. Meanwhile, Kate wonders when Emilico will return so they can prepare for their debut together.
5	5	"The Debut"; Transliteration: ""Ohirome"" (Japanese: "お披露目")	Yoshihiro Sugai	Toshiya Ōno	May 9, 2021
Barbie is taken aback when the Phantom mayhem was caused by a loose trapdoor and not neglect. The Living Dolls (Emilico, Shaun, Rum, Ricky and Lou) make their final preparations for the debut with their respective Shadows (Kate, John, Shirley, Patrick and Louise). The debutants are greeted by an adult named Edward, who serves as the judge for the debut. Edward places figurines of the Shadows on a six-tier bookshelf, where Louise and Patrick are placed on the second tier, while John, Shirley and Kate are placed on the third tier. Louise rises to the first tier when she points out that Living Dolls are mere "faces". Shirley drops to the fourth tier when Rum fails to express what Shirley feels, while Kate drops to the fourth tier when Emilico temporarily leaves her side. Kate then drops to the fifth tier when Louise scoffs at the name of Emilico. Edward plays a waltz on the piano, encouraging the Shadows to dance with their Living Dolls, but Patrick is placed on the third tier for reversing the roles of lead and follow with Ricky. Edward takes the Shadows to a garden labyrinth, while leaving the Living Dolls to eat their desserts.
6	6	"The Garden Labyrinth"; Transliteration: "Teien Meiro" (Japanese: 庭園迷路)	Hiromi Tanaka	Momoka Toyoda	May 16, 2021
Emilico, Shaun, Lou, Ricky and Rum learn that there are five fèves hidden in their desserts, though Emilico deduces that the five fèves form a key that unlocks the door towards the entrance to the garden labyrinth. Edward instructs the Living Dolls to rescue their Shadows within two hours before exiting the garden labyrinth. The Living Dolls select one item from a mixed collection to help with their quest: shears for Lou, magnifying glass for Shaun, soot suit for Ricky, lantern for Rum and pushcart for Emilico. As the challenge begins, Shaun struggles on his own; Emilico teams up with Rum; and Ricky plans to use Lou to his advantage. A explosion is heard from a distance, which turns out to be from John, who uses his soot power to detonate the crate that he was put in and starts to wander around. John eventually finds Kate in a suspended birdcage held by a crane over a bed of thorns, though she declines his marriage proposal. Kate surmises that there are no repercussions for using soot powers. The progress of the debutants is being monitored by the Third Floor Adults (Ryan, Dorothy, Joseph and Sophie).
7	7	"An Incomplete Map"; Transliteration: "Fukanzen na Chizu" (Japanese: 不完全な地図)	Takeru Ogiwara	Yūji Ōnishi	May 23, 2021
Aileen and Gerald, the Second Floor Adults, keep tabs on Edward from afar. While Shaun gets caught in a pitfall trap, Ricky worries when Lou almost falls off a cliff. When Emilico and Rum find Patrick inside a crate, Emilico gives Patrick an orange and a daffodil since she is prohibited from rescuing him. Shaun finds a way out of the pitfall trap and encounters Emilico and Rum. The three of them sit at a bench near a closed gate across from various animal statues. Based on the view of the scenery, they rotate the rabbit statue in order to open the gate. After passing by John's detonated crate, Emilico, Shaun and Rum stumble upon John at a folly. As John admits that he briefly spoke with Kate earlier, Emilico uses Shaun's magnifying glass and Rum's lantern to locate the Shadows and areas of elevation on their maps. With the bridge leading to Kate now inoperable, Emilico and Rum prepare to travel underground as they part ways with Shaun and John.
8	8	"In the Palm of His Hand"; Transliteration: "Te no Hira no Ue" (Japanese: 手のひらの上)	Ken Sanuma	Rino Yamazaki	May 30, 2021
Lou and Ricky chance upon Shirley, who is sewn to her birdcage and surrounded by poison ivy. It is explained that the Shadows emit soot in different patterns: straight up for Kate, like sparks for John, in all directions for Patrick, no emission for Shirley and in curls for Louise. Lou and Ricky find Louise in a pitfall trap underneath a hedge, where Lou makes a rope ladder to rescue Louise. Before Emilico and Rum enter a walled maze section filled with Scorches, Emilico uses some items collected in her pushcart to don a maid outfit and wield a broom. Despite hitting some dead-ends, Emilico and Rum eventually find a trapdoor at the end of a tunnel. After Rum confides that she named herself since Shirley has never spoken to her before, Emilico encourages Rum to rescue Shirley, who assumably has no negative emotions. Kate realizes that the accumulation of her emitted soot is beginning to break the chains attached to the birdcage. Meanwhile, Edward reveals his true colors behind the process of organizing the debut to Allie and Jer, the face counterparts of Aileen and Gerald.
9	9	"A Birdcage and Flowers"; Transliteration: "Torikago to Hana" (Japanese: 鳥籠と花)	Takashi Sakuma	Toshiya Ōno	June 6, 2021
The Third Floor Adults continue monitoring the progress of the debutants. At a full-height turnstile which requires two people to lift a bar at either side to pass through, Ricky needs to collaborate with Shaun, who knows where Patrick is located in the garden labyrinth. On the other hand, Shaun initially doubts that Lou gave up her shears to Ricky as a token of her gratitude, though Lou and Louise are indeed the first pair to exit the garden labyrinth. Edward sends a boulder after Ricky, prompting John to pass through and pummel the boulder. The Third Floor Adults give a commentary as Ricky molds Patrick's emitted soot into a key to unlock his crate, while Rum prunes the poison ivy surrounding Shirley inside her birdcage. Reuniting with Kate, Emilico recounts her adventure so far. Having no access to control the crane, Emilico is graced by Ricky, who relinquishes the shears as a order from Patrick. Although she cuts a path through the thorns, the birdcage collapses as Kate hangs onto the ceiling vent. Emilico jumps off the top of the crane and catches Kate in midair. They land in the pushcart cushioned by flowers that Emilico had gathered earlier.
10	10	"The Final Pair"; Transliteration: "Saigo no Ittsui" (Japanese: 最後の一対)	Tazumi Mukaiyama	Toshiya Ōno	June 13, 2021
With only ten minutes remaining, Emilico uses the pushcart as a boat to ride the waterways, while Kate uses her soot powers to control the pushcart. Meanwhile, Rum is happy when her name is addressed by Shirley, but this pair does not make it out of the garden labyrinth in time. Barbara, the Shadow of Barbie, congratulates Emilico and Kate on acing the debut, in which a party is thrown for the successful debutants. Susanna, the Shadow of Susie, serves a bitter cup of special coffee to Emilico and Kate, who then meet Maryrose, the Shadow of Rosemary. Rum and Shirley are the only pair of debutants who failed the debut. Accompanied by Allie and Jer, Edward meets with the Third Floor Adults and explains that a Shadow is a form of a Morph, a parasitic fairy that specializes in mimicry and imitation. It is noted that the special coffee is made from soot by Lord Grandfather, the head of the household. After revealing that Rum will soon be repurposed as a Veiled Doll, Edward is given the role of being the newest caretaker of the Children's Wing against his wishes.
11	11	"The Dark Drink"; Transliteration: "Kuroi Nomimono" (Japanese: 黒い飲み物)	Yūma Suzuki	Toshiya Ōno	June 20, 2021
After noticing that Emilico's personality has altered after drinking the special coffee, Kate finds Emilico's journal hidden in her bedroom. Upon learning that drinking plenty of water can cure soot sickness, Kate applies that logic to help Emilico flush the special coffee out of her system and revert to her normal personality. Meanwhile, Ryan and Dorothy, bearing their face counterparts, travel by soot train to visit a nearby village called Mirrorside. They serve a cup of special coffee to three children earmarked for becoming Living Dolls. When Emilico later goes missing, Kate meets with John in his bedroom, where she reveals that Living Dolls are human children who have been brainwashed by Shadows House. When John realizes that Shaun is acting too compliant, John attempts to knock Shaun back to his senses. Kate, John and Patrick meet with Louise in her bedroom. After revealing that her soot power allows her to control others if her soot is consumed, Louise reveals that Emilico was abducted by a Veiled Doll, assumably Edward because of his floral suit hidden under black mourning clothes. John, Patrick and Louise agree to help Kate find Emilico.
12	12	"To Lord Grandfather's Wing"; Transliteration: "Ojii-sama to Tomo ni Aru Tō e" (Japanese: おじい様と共にある棟へ)	Hayato Sakai	Yujin Ōnishi	June 27, 2021
Emilico is blindfolded and bound to a chair by Edward, who uses his soot power to manipulate his voice and desperately tries to get Emilico to expose Kate's intentions, but to no avail. Meanwhile, Shaun hatches a plan for Kate to sneak inside Lord Grandfather's Wing disguised a Veiled Doll. Kate, John and Louise sneak out by accessing Patrick's bedroom, while Patrick deals with Barbara when she unexpectedly pays a visit. Both Ricky and Lou are returned to normal after Patrick and Louise each value them as humans. Patrick then tells Kate that Edward is the caretaker of the Children's Wing, meaning he is somewhere on the first or second floors. Disguised as a Veiled Doll, Kate enters Lord Grandfather's Wing, finding a room where the special coffee is being stored. During her search for Emilico, Kate is unknowingly trailed by a Morph wearing a pink bow. As Edward continues to interrogate Emilico, the latter realizes that Kate is nearby. Aileen and Gerald alert Edward that they suspect an intruder. Edward then manages to deceive Kate into unveiling her disguise when she tries to rescue Emilico.
13	13	"For the Sake of the Shadows Family"; Transliteration: "Shadō-ke no Tame ni" (Japanese: シャドー家のために)	Kazuki Ōhashi; Yui Ikari	Toshiya Ōno	July 4, 2021
Edward wishes to be promoted to the third floor of Lord Grandfather's Wing by exposing Kate as a malcontent enemy of Shadows House. Disguised as a Veiled Doll, John sneaks inside Lord Grandfather's Wing, briefly guided by the Morph wearing a pink bow before momentarily being discovered by Aileen and Gerald. The Morph wearing a pink bow helps Emilico and Kate escape before meeting up with John. Edward, Aileen and Gerald eventually catch up to Emilico, Kate and John at the top of a tower, though John propels Emilico and Kate away as the two take flight. Emilico and Kate reunite with Shaun, Ricky and Patrick in the Children's Wing. As Edward gives chase and tries to corner them, this is all witnessed by the Star Bearers led by Barbara, who reports this violation to the Third Floor Adults. Although the Third Floor Adults agree to demote Aileen and Gerald to the first floor, Lord Grandfather leniently reprimands Edward instead of banishing him from Shadows House. The Morph wearing a pink bow presumably belongs to Rum, confined inside a room that resembles a holding cell. A soot train brings three children as new Living Dolls for Shadows House.

=== Season 2 (2022) ===
No. overall	No. in season	Title	Directed by	Written by	Original release date
14	1	"Those Newly Come of Age"; Transliteration: "Shin Seijin-tachi" (Japanese: 新成人たち)	Yui Ikari	Toshiya Ōno	July 9, 2022
Barbie and Barbara fend off Scorches in a corridor, where a robed figure slips past them. In the middle of the night, Barbie urges all the Cleaning Squads to report any information about this incident. Upon being informed by Emilico, Kate Mirror surmises that Edward could be the robed figure. In the morning, Maryrose and Rosemary give an orientation to Emilico, Kate, Lou and Louise about the Children's Wing, which includes the library, conservatory, music room and dance hall. Afterwards, the Shadows are separated from the Living Dolls for a special lesson, in which Susanna teaches Kate, John and Louise about mastering their unique soot powers in a training room. Meanwhile, Susie attends to Emilico, Shaun and Lou in the parlor, where Susie momentarily leaves to retrieve the first-aid kit when Emilico cuts her finger from a broken plate. Susanna becomes suspicious when Kate attempts to discreetly pass a letter to John, but Kate manages to smooth things over with Susanna. Barbie barges into the training room with Barbara having an uncontrolled soot output. While evacuating, Susanna explains to Kate, John and Louise that Barbara solely releases sixty percent of the soot that Shadows House produces in a day.
15	2	"The Best Star Bearer"; Transliteration: "Saikō no "Hoshitsuki"" (Japanese: 最高の"星つき")	Miki Aoki	Momoka Toyoda	July 16, 2022
Barbie, Barbara, Ben, Benjamin, Susie, Susanna, Olly and Oliver, collectively the members of the Star Bearers, hold a meeting. Oliver showcases a giant canister vacuum cleaner called the Mobile Soot Collector as his latest invention, though Susanna points out that it cannot leave Oliver's bedroom due to its sheer size. Meanwhile, it is revealed that Kate declined John's marriage proposal in her letter, but this was done on purpose for John to emit soot and uncover a hidden message about the special coffee brainwashing the Living Dolls. Shaun tells Emilico that the effects of the special coffee may only be temporary. After the Cleaning Squads clean the great hall, the Star Bearers administer servings of special coffee to the Cleaning Squads, but Emilico and Shaun manage to discreetly spit out theirs. As Kate deduces that the special coffee forces the Living Dolls into servitude, she resolves to become a Star Bearer in order to gain access to the supply of special coffee. After Cleaning Squad 10 finishes cleaning duty, Emilico studies with Rosemary in the classroom, but Rosemary ends up falling asleep. In the dance hall, Kate furthers her plan by talking to Maryrose, who is well acquainted with Barbara.
16	3	"A Great Cleaning"; Transliteration: "Ōsōji" (Japanese: 大掃除)	Takashi Sakuma	Takahito Ōnishi	July 23, 2022
Emilico and Kate go to the training room, where they have an unpleasant encounter with the Living Doll twins both named Belle accompanied by their Shadow twins named Isabelle and Mirabelle. Kate stops Isabelle and Mirabelle from using their soot power to control the movements of Emilico, who briefly acts like a dog. The next morning, the Cleaning Squads are attacked in the great hall by Scorches harbored by Rosemary, who has contracted soot sickness. Susie and Ben help fend off the Scorches, but Mia and Doug from the Cleaning Squads are among those who have contracted soot sickness. When the Scorches combine into a Phantom, both Olly and Nancy from the Research Team arrive with a smaller version of the Mobile Soot Collector. Emilico volunteers to wield the nozzle, and Ben helps break up the Phantom back into Scorches. Shaun and Ricky fail in their attempt to pursue the robed figure spotted on the ceiling beams. Emilico successfully vacuums the Phantom before Lou and Ricky catch her from falling. The Belle Twins then involuntarily break the glass bottles of special coffee intended for the weekly rejoicing party of the Living Dolls.
17	4	"Potential Suspects"; Transliteration: "Hannin Kōho" (Japanese: 犯人候補)	Shin'ichirō Ueda	Rino Yamazaki	July 30, 2022
Oliver tells Barbara, Benjamin and Susanna that the Scorches were intentionally released from the soot-crushing room. After Gil and Eve from the First-Aid Team give a final tally on those stricken with soot sickness, Barbara wants the Star Bearers to handle things on their own without reporting to Edward about the loss of the special coffee. The Living Dolls and Shadows are assembled in the meeting room of the Star Bearers' Residential Tower, where Barbara announces that the whole incident was caused by the Belle Twins, who are put on soot pipe cleaning duty as punishment. The Star Bearers then interrogate an unintimidated Kate, who sternly offers to find the true perpetrator. In her bedroom, Kate analyzes that the true perpetrator could be a Shadow with a high soot volume. Emilico and Kate visit the washing room, where Mia has recovered while Rosemary is still undergoing treatment. Planning to map out a floor plan of the Children's Wing, Emilico and Kate meet with Shaun and John in the courtyard. They spot an old cabin from afar after climbing an external stairway leading to the third floor. John forcibly opens the cabin, but the front gable wall topples to the ground.
18	5	"A Midnight Meeting of Peers"; Transliteration: "Shin'ya no Dōkikai" (Japanese: 深夜の同期会)	Tazumi Mukaiyama	Momoka Toyoda	August 6, 2022
Olly, Oliver, Jeremy, Jeremiah, Liddy, Lydia, Nancy and Anna, collectively the members of the Research Team, are exposed inside the old cabin used as a research lab. While Shaun watches as Olly eagerly tests Emilico's motor skills, Kate and John learn a few trade secrets from Oliver: Barbara, Benjamin, Gilbert, Kate and John are the five Shadows with the highest soot volume; Douglas and Sarah emit soot in the same "stalactite" pattern as Kate; and the robed figure is most likely a male adult familiar with the Children's Wing. Shaun picks three different deodorizing perfumes from ten total that the robed figure could have been wearing at the time, but Lydia debunks this theory because each Shadow has a unique odor. Before leaving, Kate and John are given keys, while Emilico and Shaun are given long-distance key extender sticks to access the Living Dolls' rooms from the outside. At midnight, Kate, John, Louise and Patrick hold a meeting, rallying around the Phantom incidents to establish a bond of trust and commonality. When molding sculptures, they find out that there are textural differences in their emitted soot. Louise and Patrick decide to join Kate and John in their budding revolt.
19	6	"Night Sky"; Transliteration: "Yoru no Sora" (Japanese: 夜の空)	Koitohan	Yūji Ōnishi	August 13, 2022
Emilico and Shaun continue mapping out Shadows House and wonder about their human lives beyond its walls. While sitting on the roof, Emilico and Shaun deduce a few things: the Shadows were made to mimic the Living Dolls instead of the opposite; Rum is now a Veiled Doll; and the names of the Shadows are the true names of the Living Dolls. Emilico and Shaun then look up at the starry sky in awe. When they resume mapping out Shadows House, Emilico has a brief encounter with the mysterious robed figure nicknamed Master Robe, who vanishes before Shaun catches up to Emilico. The next morning, the rejoicing party is held at the great hall four days too early. While trying to undo the brainwashing effects of the special coffee from Emilico, Kate notes that the special coffee was only a grand placebo, while Benjamin just used his soot power to intensify the emotions of the Living Dolls once inhaled. While fixing the front gable wall of the research lab, John is eventually lecture by Jeremiah about the energy levels of Scorches which vary by density. Oliver then arrives to inform John that he has been summoned by the Star Bearers.
20	7	"Individual Investigations"; Transliteration: "Kobetsu Sōsa" (Japanese: 個別捜査)	Shin'ichirō Ueda	Rino Yamazaki	August 20, 2022
Louise has Lou put on her charm to convince other Shadows to share details about their soot powers. Maryrose tells Louise to consult with the Star Bearers for more information regarding an invitation to Lord Grandfather's Wing. In the gym of the Star Bearer's Residential Tower, Benjamin suggests to Louise that Lou needs to take better care of her face and body. Following advice from Ricky, Patrick speaks with two older Shadows still residing in the Children's Wing named William and Henry, confirming that Barbara and Maryrose are the oldest Shadows residing in the Children's Wing. John pass by after being scolded by the Star Bearers for trying to petition Kate for marriage. Patrick then visits the library to learn more about marriage, running into Sarah there. Afterwards, Patrick visits the conservatory, where he meets Margaret. He considers wanting to grow flowers with her someday, and she gives him a white peony as a memento of their acquaintance. Ricky and Patrick chances upon Lou and Louise as well as Emilico and Kate in the hallway. Patrick is shown to have unrequited love for Emilico ever since their encounter during their debut.
21	8	"The Identity of Master Robe"; Transliteration: "Rōbu-sama no Shōtai" (Japanese: ローブ様の正体)	Tazumi Mukaiyama	Momoka Toyoda	August 27, 2022
Emilico and Kate witness the Belle Twins being rushed to the washing room on a stretcher. While holding another meeting of peers in the evening with Louise and Patrick, Kate narrows the culprit to two likely suspects in Sarah and Douglas. John arrives with the unsettling news that high soot volume and Phantoms have no correlation, according to Jeremiah. Shaun recognizes that the scent of the white peony kept in Patrick's bathroom is the same as the scent of Master Robe, leading Kate to conclude who the culprit might be, based on who did not contract sook sickness during the most recent Phantom incident. Emilico, Kate, Shaun and John head to a flower bed, where a message in a bottle is buried. At night, they meet with Master Robe in the great hall. When Master Robe reveals the shocking secret about Morphs, Kate becomes increasingly upset when it is confirmed that she has retained memories prior to becoming a Shadow. This all culminates to the exposure of the identity of Master Robe, who is unveiled to be Maryrose.
22	9	"The Last Lessons"; Transliteration: "Saigo no Jugyō" (Japanese: 最後の授業)	Jun Takahashi	Yūji Ōnishi	September 3, 2022
Maryrose can manipulate soot, despite possessing a low soot volume. Rosemary arrives in crutches, explaining that she willingly has a Scorch anchored in her stomach. It is revealed that an invitation to Lord Grandfather's Wing is a summons for a Living Doll and Shadow to undergo a fusion ceremony in order to become an adult. Rosemary attacks Emilico and Shaun with Scorches, leading them to contract soot sickness. Kate and John retreat to a nearby forest, being chased by Rosemary and Maryrose with several Scorches, which are soon plunged into an aqueduct after Kate creates a bridge made from soot. Maryrose then releases a bottle of soot, nearly dragging Kate into the aqueduct. After being saved by John, Kate realizes that Maryrose can absorb and manipulate soot. Maryrose transforms John's soot blasted from his fist into Scorches, prompting Kate and John take cover when the Scorches fuse into a Phantom. While being accompanied by Aileen and Gerald, Edward runs into a Second Floor Adult named Thomas, the previous caretaker of the Children's Wing. Inside a Box of Completion, Edward cuts open a cocoon, revealing a dead Living Doll and a shriveled up Shadow, the result of a failed fusion.
23	10	"The Value of Friends"; Transliteration: "Nakama no Kachi" (Japanese: 仲間の価値)	Ken Sanuma	Rino Yamazaki	September 10, 2022
Kate and John are forced to continue evading when Maryrose corners them with her dispersed Scorches. Having filled their mouths with water beforehand and pretending to contract soot sickness, Emilico and Shaun run off in search of Kate and John. After Kate shares bread with John to replenish his stamina, they proceed to jump into an aqueduct and travel to the fountain garden while the Scorches lurk nearby. Kate and John seemingly get captured by Maryrose, who reforms the Scorches back into a Phantom. However, Kate previously used her soot power so Emilico and Shaun can be disguised as Kate and John, while John uses the last ounce of his strength to destroy the Phantom. Rosemary and Maryrose are ultimately apprehended, admitting defeat and accepting punishment. Despite initial hesitance, Rosemary and Maryrose are handed over to the Star Bearers the next morning.
24	11	"The Answer of the Two"; Transliteration: "Futari no Kotae" (Japanese: ふたりの答え)	Hayato Sakai	Toshiya Ōno	September 17, 2022
Emilico and Kate are requested to accompany the Star Bearers as they escort Rosemary and Maryrose through the Passageway of Glory, the corridor that connects the Children's Wing to Lord Grandfather's Wing. In the past, a Shadow named Christopher and his Living Doll named Anthony were beloved by the residents of the Children's Wing at that time. When Christopher received an invitation to Lord Grandfather's Wing, Maryrose abruptly ceased contact with Barbara. Having accidentally wounded Barbie's forehead out of frustration towards Maryrose, Barbara was put in charge of supervising the Children's Wing as a Star Bearer until Barbie's forehead healed. Before then, Maryrose convinced Anthony to stop drinking the special coffee due to its brainwashing effects. However, Anthony fled back to the Children's Wing, revealing that Christopher committed suicide after learning the gruesome truth about the fusion ceremony. In the present, Barbie and Barbara escort Rosemary and Maryrose to Edward at the halfway point in the Passageway of Glory. Maryrose summons a Phantom to capture Edward, but Edward subdues Maryrose with deafening sound. Declaring their reticence to sacrifice that which is precious for the sake of undergoing the fusion ceremony, Rosemary and Maryrose leap off the balcony to their deaths.
25	12	"Those Who Fight Back"; Transliteration: "Aragau Mono-tachi" (Japanese: 抗う者たち)	Yui Ikari	Toshiya Ōno	September 24, 2022
Edward realizes that he will be blamed for the deaths of Rosemary and Maryrose. Kate returns to her bedroom, where she is awaited by Anthony wearing a robe. She deduces that Anthony was an accomplice for Maryrose. Anthony leaves with the promise that Kate will need him to take command of the Children's Wing. The next morning, Emilico questions her duties as a Living Doll after having a dream that unlocks her childhood memory before moving into Shadows House. Later on, Kate tells Emilico about how the Living Dolls drink the special coffee to keep themselves in a docile state. With Maryrose gone, Barbara transfers Isabelle and Mirabelle from Team 9 with Elizabeth and Margaret to Team 10 with Kate, Sarah and Louise. As Emilico works extra hard to fulfill her role as new leader of Cleaning Squad 10, she stands up to Barbie and vouches that one Belle Twin serves as the Living Doll for both Isabelle and Mirabelle after the death of the other Belle Twin. As they pass by Barbie and Barbara in the courtyard, Emilico and Kate yearn to continue the legacy of Rosemary and Maryrose, planning to rebel against Shadows House.
