= List of Shadows House chapters =

Shadows House is a Japanese manga series written and illustrated by the duo Somato (specifically, written and designed by Nori and illustrated by Hisshi). It began serialization in Shueisha's seinen manga magazine Weekly Young Jump on September 6, 2018. Shueisha has compiled its chapters into individual tankōbon volumes. The first volume was released on January 18, 2019. As of July 17, 2026, twenty-two volumes have been released.

The manga has been licensed for English release in North America by Yen Press.

== Volumes ==
No.	Original release date	Original ISBN	English release date	English ISBN
1	January 18, 2019	978-4-08-891184-7	June 21, 2022	978-1-9753-4592-1
1. "Kate and Emilico" (ケイトとエミリコ, Keito to Emiriko); 2. "Broken Dolls Are..." (壊れた人形は, Kowareta Ningyō wa); 3. "Manual" (説明書, Setsumeisho); 4. "Sootmen" (すすだるま, Susu Daruma); 5. "Hunger" (空腹, Kūfuku); 6. "Mirror" (鏡, Kagami); 7. "Another Face" (別の顔, Betsu no Kao); 8. "Outside the Room, There's..." (部屋の外には, Heya no Soto ni wa); 9. "The Desooting Room" (すす取りの間, Susutori no Ma); 10. "An Indelible Blot" (落ちない汚れ, Ochinai Yogore); 11. "The Undebuted Pair" (お披露目前の二人, Ohirome Mae no Futari); 12. "In Filth" (汚しながら, Yogoshi Nagara)
2	May 17, 2019	978-4-08-891266-0	October 18, 2022	978-1-9753-4594-5
13. "Lessons" (授業, Jugyō); 14. "Phantom" (亡霊, Bōrei); 15. "Dolls That Move" (動く人形, Ugoku Ningyō); 16. "Wash Day" (洗浄の日, Senjō no Hi); 17. "Star-Bearer" (星つき, Hoshi-tsuki); 18. "On Night Patrol" (深夜の見回りにて, Shin'ya no Mimawari Nite); 19. "Don't Think" (余計なこと, Yokei na Koto); 20. "An Obliging Shadow" (親切なお影様, Shinsetsu na Okage-sama); 21. "The Night Before" (前夜, Zen'ya); 22. "Five New Pairs" (五対の新人, Gotsui no Shinjin); 23. "Ranking" (格付け, Kakuzuke); 24. "Names" (名前, Namae)
3	September 19, 2019	978-4-08-891363-6	February 21, 2023	978-1-9753-4596-9
25. "Appraisal Standards" (審査基準, Shinsa Kijun); 26. "Odd Tools" (不揃いな道具たち, Fuzoroi na Dōgu-tachi); 27. "The Garden Maze" (庭園迷路, Teien Meiro); 28. "Eyes" (視線, Shisen); 29. "Incomplete Maps" (不完全な地図, Fukanzen na Chizu); 30. "The Black Dots" (黒い点, Kuroi Ten); 31. "A Mistake" (失敗, Shippai); 32. "The Trick Grows Clear" (浮かび上がる細工, Ukabiagaru Zaiku); 33. "First Place" (首席, Shuseki); 34. "How I Always Look" (いつもの姿, Itsumo no Sugata); 35. "Since We Can't See" (見えないから, Mienai Kara); 36. "Examiner" (試験官, Shiken-kan)
4	February 19, 2020	978-4-08-891461-9	July 18, 2023	978-1-9753-4598-3
37. ""Faces"" (「顔」, Kao); 38. "Pass" (合格, Gōkaku); 39. "The Most Unfortunate" (一番かわいそうな, Ichiban Kawaisō na); 40. "Anxious Soot" (不安の煤, Fuan no Susu); 41. "Birdcage and Flowers" (鳥籠と花, Torikago to Hana); 42. "Solution" (解, Kai); 43. "The Final Pair" (最後の一対, Saigo no Ittsui); 44. "What It Means to Come of Age" (成人になるということ, Seijin ni Naru to Iu Koto); 45. "General Evaluation" (総評, Sōhyō); 46. "L-I-V-I-N-G. D-O-L-L-S." (いきにんぎょう, Iki Ningyō); 47. "A Soot-Based Illness" (すすによる病, Susu ni Yoru Yamai); 48. "A Shadow of Normal Life" (日常生活の影, Nichijō Seikatsu no Kage); 49. "Soot Talents" (すすの能力, Susu no Nōryoku); 50. "The Letter" (手紙, Tegami)
5	June 19, 2020	978-4-08-891545-6	November 21, 2023	978-1-9753-4600-3
51. "John and Shaun" (ジョンとショーン, Jon to Shōn); 52. "The Four Star-Bearer Pairs" (四対の星つき, Yontsui no Hoshitsuki); 53. "The Hour of Rejoicing" (喜びの会, Yorokobi no Kai); 54. "Rivals" (好敵手たち, Kōtekishu-tachi); 55. "The Rosemary Incident" (ローズマリーの変, Rōzumarī no Hen); 56. "Deep Clean" (大掃除, Ōsōji); 57. "Beyond Repair" (破鏡不照, Hakyō Fushō); 58. "Suspects" (犯人候補, Han'nin Kōho); 59. "A Stroll" (散策, Sansaku); 60. "The Research Team" (研究班, Kenkyū-han); 61. "A Midnight Reunion" (深夜の同期会, Shin'ya no Dōkikai); 62. "Night Sky" (夜の空, Yoru no Sora)
6	October 16, 2020	978-4-08-891713-9	March 19, 2024	978-1-9753-4602-7
63. "Living Doll Assembly" (集められる生き人形, Atsumerareru Iki Ningyō); 64. "Regarding Coagles" (こびりつきについて, Kobiritsuki ni Tsuite); 65. "Regarding Summoning" (お呼ばれについて, Oyobare ni Tsuite); 66. "Regarding Marriage" (婚姻について, Kon'in ni Tsuite); 67. "The Noble Robe's Identity" (ローブ様の正体は..., Rōbu-sama no Shōtai wa...); 68. "The Phantom Incident Culprit" (亡霊騒ぎの犯人, Bōrei Sawagi no Han'nin); 69. "Reason" (理由, Riyū); 70. "The Final Lessons" (最後の授業, Saigo no Jugyō); 71. "A Summoning and a Welcome" (お呼ばれとお迎え, Oyobare to Omukae); 72. "Kindness" (やさしさ, Yasashi-sa); 73. "Three Options at the Canal" (水路の三択, Suiro no Mitaku); 74. "The Value of Companions" (仲間の価値, Nakama no Kachi)
7	March 18, 2021	978-4-08-891819-8	September 17, 2024	979-8-8554-0065-6
75. "The Promise" (約束, Yakusoku); 76. "Unfading Scars" (消えない傷, Kienai Kizu); 77. "A Choice with No Right Answer" (答えのない選択, Kotae no Nai Sentaku); 78. "The Pair's Answer" (ふたりの答え, Futari no Kotae); 79. "Those Who Resist" (抗う者たち, Aragau Monotachi); 80. "Daily Routine" (日常, Nichijō); 81. "New Leaders" (新しい班長, Atarashī Hanchō); 82. "Team Emilico" (エミリコ班, Emiriko-han); 83. "A Knotty Problem" (難題, Nandai); 84. "Infraction" (ルール違反, Rūru Ihan); 85. "Special Coffee" (特別な珈琲, Tokubetsu na Kōhī); 86. "The Administrator's Agenda" (管理者の思惑, Kanrisha no Omowaku)
8	June 18, 2021	978-4-08-892008-5	January 21, 2025	979-8-8554-0343-5
87. "Inspection" (視察, Shisatsu); 88. "Appraisal" (値踏み, Nebumi); 89. "Honeyed Words" (甘言, Kangen); 90. "A Golden Opportunity" (千載一遇, Senzai'ichigū); 91. "Kate" (ケイト, Keito); 92. "Faceless Doll (1)" (顔の見えない人形 (1), Kao no Mienai Ningyō (1)); 93. "Faceless Doll (2)" (顔の見えない人形 (2), Kao no Mienai Ningyō (2)); 94. "Spies" (内通者, Naitsūsha); 95. "Since Then" (あれから, Are Kara); 96. "From Now On" (これから, Kore Kara); 97. "What I Can Believe In" (信じられるもの, Shinjirareru Mono)
9	November 19, 2021	978-4-08-892139-6	July 22, 2025	979-8-8554-0345-9
98. "A Trap is Laid" (仕掛けられた罠, Shikakerareta Wana); 99. "An Unexpected Visitor" (思わぬ来訪者, Omowanu Raihōsha); 100. "Reunion of Five Pairs" (五対の同期会, Gotsui no Dōki Kai); 101. "Bonds" (絆, Kizuna); 102. "Memories" (思い出, Omoide); 103. "The Day Before" (前日, Zenjitsu); 104. "A Certain Girl's Name" (或る少女の名前, Aru Shōjo no Namae); 105. "The Promised Starry Sky" (約束の星空, Yakusoku no Hoshizora); 106. "My Name" (わたしの名前, Watashi no Namae)
10	March 18, 2022	978-4-08-892246-1	January 20, 2026	979-8-8554-0347-3
107. "Soliloquy" (独白, Dokuhaku); 108. "Childhood" (生い立ち, Oitachi); 109. "Shadows House" (シャドーハウス, Shadō Hausu); 110. "A Peculiar, Unwritten Rule" (奇妙な不文律, Kimyō na Fubunritsu); 111. "The Shadows Lurking in the Woods" (森に潜む影, Mori ni Hisomu Kage); 112. "Arrival at the Manor" (入館, Nyūkan); 113. "Terms of a Pair" (対の条件, Ittsui no Jōken); 114. "Your Name Is…" (あなたの名前は, Anata no Namae wa); 115. "Emilico" (エミリコ, Emiriko)
11	June 17, 2022	978-4-08-892337-6	June 23, 2026	979-8-8554-0349-7
116. "The First Errand" (初めてのお遣い, Hajimete no Otsukai); 117. "Power Dynamics" (勢力図, Seiryokuzu); 118. "The Assembly of Roses" (薔薇の集い, Bara no Tsudoi); 119. "The Spark of Reform" (改革の口火, Kaikaku no Kuchibi); 120. "Polarization" (ニ極化, Ni Kyoku-ka); 121. "The Hunted" (狩られる者, Karareru Mono); 122. "Duel" (決闘, Kettō); 123. "A Wrong Choice" (間違った選択, Machigatta Sentaku); 124. "Sincerity and True Feelings" (誠意と本意, Seii to Hon'i)
12	October 19, 2022	978-4-08-892462-5	November 24, 2026	979-8-8554-0351-0
125. "Bitterness and Sweetness" (苦さと甘さ, Nigasa to Amasa); 126. "The Key to Strength" (強さの秘訣, Tsuyosa no Hiketsu); 127. "Helping Hand (1)" (救いの手 (1), Sukuinote (1)); 128. "Helping Hand (2)" (救いの手 (2), Sukuinote (2)); 129. "Mysterious Means" (秘密の手段, Himitsu no Shudan); 130. "Experiment and Miscalculation" (実験と誤算, Jikken to Gosan); 131. "Proving the Hypothesis" (仮説の証明, Kasetsu no Shōmei); 132. "Trump Card" (奥の手, Oku no Te); 133. "Peerless Existence" (無二の存在, Muni no Sonzai)
13	February 17, 2023	978-4-08-892601-8	—	—
134. "Heart" (心, Kokoro); 135. "Master-Servant Relationship" (主従関係, Shujū Kankei); 136. "For Whom" (誰がために, Taga Tame Ni); 137. "Garbage" (がらくた, Garakuta); 138. "Baton Relay" (バトンリレー, Batonrirē); 139. "Results of the Comparison" (照合結果, Shōgō Kekka); 140. "A Hole in the Plan" (計画の穴, Keikaku no Ana); 141. "Crime Motive" (犯行動機, Hankō Dōki); 142. "Lessons Learned" (学びの成果, Manabi no Seika)
14	July 19, 2023	978-4-08-892771-8	—	—
143. "The Difference in Power" (実力差, Jitsuryoku-sa); 144. "What Cannot Be Surrendered" (譲れないもの, Yuzurenai Mono); 145. "Ramifications of the Duel" (決闘の代償, Kettō no Daishō); 146. "Confession" (告自, Tsuge-ji); 147. "Some Scars Don't Heal" (癒えぬ傷痕, Ienu Kizuato); 148. "Sincerity" (本心, Honshin); 149. "Lewis" (ルイス, Ruisu); 150. "A Show of Determination" (決意の証, Ketsui no Akashi); 151. "Smile" (笑顔, Egao); 152. "The Truth" (真実, Shinjitsu); 153. "Election Results" (投票結果, Tōhyō Kekka)
15	October 19, 2023	978-4-08-892865-4	—	—
154. "Mission and Responsibility" (使命と責任, Shimei to Sekinin); 155. "Ephemeral" (かりそめ, Karisome); 156. "A Brief Respite" (東の間, Higashi no Ma); 157. "Soulmate" (ソウルメイト, Sōrumeito); 158. "State of Emergency" (緊急事態, Kinkyū Jitai); 159. "The Fragrance of Sin" (罪の香り, Tsumi no Kaori); 160. "Margaret" (マーガレット, Māgaretto); 161. "Noble Heart" (気高き心, Kedakaki Kokoro); 162. "Uncontrollable Situation" (暴走状態, Bōsō Jōtai); 163. "Language of Flowers" (花言葉, Hana Kotoba); 164. "Fragments of Favor" (恩恵の欠片, Onkei no Kakera)
16	February 19, 2024	978-4-08-893113-5	—	—
165. "Tragedy and Opportunity" (悲劇と好機, Higeki to Kōki); 166. "Means and Ends" (手段と目的, Shudan to Mokuteki); 167. "Disciplinary Team" (風紀班, Fūki-han); 168. "Behind the Curtains" (裏工作, Ura Kōsaku); 169. "The Five New Pairs" (新たな五対, Aratana Gotsui); 170. "Behind the Scenes" (舞台裏, Butaiura); 171. "King" (キング, Kingu); 172. "The First Trial" (ひとつの試験, Hitotsu no Shiken); 173. "Solidarity" (結束, Kessoku); 174. "Their Secret" (彼女たちの秘密, Kanojotachi no Himitsu); 175. "The Wall that Blocks the Way" (立ちはだかる壁, Tachihadakaru Kabe)
17	May 17, 2024	978-4-08-893259-0	—	—
176. "Suggestion and Awakening" (暗示と覚醒, Anji to Kakusei); 177. "Oliver's Trial" (オリバーの試験, Oribā no Shiken); 178. "The Respective Battles" (それぞれの戦い, Sorezore no Tatakai); 179. "The Curse's True Form" (呪いの正体, Noroi no Shōtai); 180. "Scheme" (策略, Sakuryaku); 181. "Re-examination" (再試験, Sai Shiken); 182. "Master and Apprentice" (師弟, Shitei); 183. "Memories of the Circus" (サーカスの記憶, Sākasu no Kioku); 184. "The Two Intruders" (二体の侵入者, Ni-tai no Shin'nyū-sha); 185. "The Operation Continues" (作戦続行, Sakusen Zokkō); 186. "United Front" (共同戦線, Kyōdō Sensen)
18	September 19, 2024	978-4-08-893377-1	—	—
187. "Suspicion" (猜疑心, Saigishin); 188. "Enemies and Allies" (敵と味方, Teki to Mikata); 189. "Unification's Ceremony" (一体化の儀式, Ittaika no Gishiki); 190. "Fanatic" (狂信者, Kyōshinja); 191. "Missed Memories" (欠けた記憶, Kaketa Kioku); 192. "Monster" (怪物, Kaibutsu); 193. "The End of the Operation" (作戦の結末, Sakusen no Ketsumatsu); 194. "Undercurrent" (水面下, Suimenka); 195. "New Teams" (新班編成, Shin-han Hensei); 196. "Master Cristopher" (クリストファー様, Kurisutofā-sama); 197. "Anthony" (アンソニー, Ansonī)
19	January 17, 2025	978-4-08-893479-2	—	—
198. "Soliloquy" (独白, Dokuhaku); 199. "Upbringing" (生い立ち, Oitachi); 200. "Shadows House" (シャドーハウス, Shadō Hausu); 201. "Loss" (喪失, Sōshitsu); 202. "Remaining Friends" (残った仲間, Nokotta Nakama); 203. "Deception" (欺瞞, Giman); 204. "Servant" (奉仕者, Hōshi-sha); 205. "Downfall" (没落, Botsuraku); 206. "Discord" (葛藤, Kattō); 207. "All in One Place" (一堂に会して, Ichidō ni Kai Shite); 208. "Rules" (正義, Seigi)
20	July 17, 2025	978-4-08-893617-8	—	—
209. "Starry Night" (星降る夜, Hoshi Furu Yoru); 210. "Tag Team Formation" (タッグを組んで, Taggu o Kunde); 211. "Visit" (お見舞い, O Mimai); 212. "Eve's Worries" (イヴの悩み, Ivu no Nayami); 213. "Suzie's Dream" (スージーの夢, Sūjī no Yume); 214. "Older Sister" (お姉ちゃん, O Nēchan); 215. "Records and Memory" (記録と記憶, Kiroku to Kioku); 216. "Louise's Awakening" (ルイーズの目覚め, Ruīzu no Mezame); 217. "Revenge" (かたき討ち, Katakiuchi); 218. "Scheduled Report" (定期報告会, Teiki Hōkokukai); 219. "Face-to-Face" (直談判, Jikadanpan)
21	January 19, 2026	978-4-08-894058-8	—	—
220. "Joseph's Intentions" (ジョゼフの思惑, Jozefu no Omowaku); 221. "Old Tale" (昔語り, Mukashigatari); 222. "Blinded by Peace" (平和ボケ, Heiwa Boke); 223. "Removing the Veil" (氷解, Hyōkai); 224. "Together in Coal Mine" (コールマインと共に, Kōrumain to Tomoni); 225. "Reunion" (再会, Saikai); 226. "How We Feel About the Grandfather" (おじい様への想い, Ojī-sama e no Omoi); 227. "Inspection" (見学, Kengaku); 228. "A Chance for Growth" (成長の機会, Seichō no Kikai); 229. "Mia's Whereabouts" (ミアの居場所, Mia no Ibasho); 230. Hataage (旗揚げ)
22	July 17, 2026	978-4-08-894270-4	—	—
231. Doroshī wa Kireisuki (ドロシーはきれい好き); 232. Habatsu (派閥); 233. Fushin'na Tayori (不審な便り); 234. Kanō tte ita Nozomi (叶っていた望み); 235. Himeta Omoi (秘めた想い); 236. Uramichi (裏道); 237. Nandodemo (何度でも); 238. Senjō ni Mau (戦場に舞う); 239. Haiin (敗因); 240. Raian no Kubi (ライアンの首); 241. Sofi no Heya (ソフィの部屋)

== Chapters not yet in tankōbon format ==
242. Rūru Muyō (ルール無用)
243. Yureru Tomasu (揺れるトマス)
244. Hon'ne (本音)
245. Mein Disshu (メインディッシュ)
246. Kenshin to Mukui (献身と報い)
247. Teisen Yōkyū (停戦要求)
248. Shiawase na Ketsumatsu (幸せな結末)
249. Shukuteki (宿敵)
250. Jozefu no Heya (ジョゼフの部屋)
251. Shadō (シャドー)
252. Kyasarin no Kyōiku (キャサリンの教育)
