= Innocence (Eir Aoi song) =

2012 song by Eir Aoi

Single by Eir Aoi

from the album Blau
- Released: November 21, 2012
- Genre: J-pop, rock
- Length: 4:37
- Label: SME Records
- Songwriters: Eir, Ryosuke Shigenaga

Eir Aoi singles chronology
"Aurora" (2012)	"Innocence" (2012)	"Cobalt Sky" (2013)

"Innocence" is the third single by Japanese singer Eir Aoi, released on November 21, 2012, under SME Records. The song gained significant recognition as the second opening theme for the 2012 anime series, Sword Art Online, specifically for the "Fairy Dance" arc.

The song is one of Aoi's most commercially successful tracks, receiving a Gold certification from the Recording Industry Association of Japan (RIAJ) for exceeding 100,000 digital downloads. It also achieved success on physical charts, maintaining a presence on the Oricon Weekly Singles Chart for 28 weeks.

== Background and release ==
The single was announced in September 2012 as the second opening theme for the anime series Sword Art Online. It was released by SME Records on November 21, 2012, in three formats: a standard CD, a limited CD+DVD edition, and a press-limited anime edition. The anime edition features alternative cover art and includes the "TV size" version of the title track.

== Production and composition ==
"Innocence" was composed and arranged by Ryosuke Shigenaga, with lyrics credited to Shigenaga and Eir Aoi. The song is a J-pop track with rock instrumentation, featuring Masanori Mine on guitar and Fire on bass. The recording was mixed by Eiichi Nishizawa at Studio Sound Valley.

== Music video ==
The music video for "Innocence" was directed by Hideaki Sunaga. The video features Aoi performing in a room with light fixtures and outdoor scenes set in a field. The video was later included on the DVD for the limited edition release of the album Blau.

== Release history/formats ==
Region	Date	Format	Label	Catalog
Japan	November 21, 2012	CD single (Regular)	SME Records	SECL-1216
Japan	November 21, 2012	CD + DVD (Limited)	SME Records	SECL-1214–5
Japan	November 21, 2012	CD + DVD (Anime)	SME Records	SECL-1217–8
Various	November 21, 2012	Digital download	SME Records	—
