= Yakusoku =

Yakusoku may refer to:

- The Rendezvous (1972 film), or Yakusoku, a Japanese film
- Yakusoku (MUCC song), 2010
- Yakusoku (Lead song), 2015
- Yakusoku -Promise Code- (GARNiDELiA song), 2016
- Yakusoku (Eir Aoi song), 2018
