= Kuro (manga) =

Japanese manga series

- First tankōbon volume cover, featuring Coco and Kuro (held in her arms)

黒
- Genre: Horror fantasy; Mystery; Slice of life
- Manga
- Written by: Somato
- Published by: Shueisha
- English publisher: NA: Yen Press
- Imprint: Young Jump Comics
- Magazine: Aoblo! (2011–12); Aoharu Online (2013); Tonari no Young Jump (2014–16)
- Original run: May 24, 2011 – June 24, 2016
- Volumes: 3
- icon

Kuro (黒; lit. 'Black') is a Japanese web manga series written and illustrated by the duo Somato. It was serialized across three Shueisha's websites from 2011 to 2016; Aoblo!, Aoharu Online, and Tonari no Young Jump. Its chapters were collected in three tankōbon volumes.

== Plot ==
A black-haired girl named Coco and her cat, Kuro, live in a manor on the outskirts of town. Though they live peacefully, their existence is fraught with unseen dangers, and Coco remains unaware that monstrous entities share their home. Kuro is no ordinary feline, and Coco herself suffers from lost childhood memories. Despite subtle unease about the irregularities in her life, she finds contentment in her daily routine with Kuro. The townspeople exhibit varied attitudes toward Coco: some befriend her, others offer unwavering support, while a few remain distant or openly hostile. Some people hate Kuro because of their connection to Coco's mysterious origins and the town's ongoing conflict with the creatures lurking in the shadows. Over time, Kuro's appetite diminishes, and Coco's health declines until she becomes reclusive. Concerned, Milk and Maria enter the manor to aid her, only to find Coco in a visibly altered state. Their efforts to help her trigger the return of her repressed memories, revealing the tragic past that shaped her fate.

== Publication ==
Written and illustrated by the duo Somato, Kuro started on Shueisha's Aoblo! website on May 24, 2011. On November 30, 2012, Aoblo! was relaunched as Aoharu Online, and the series resumed publication there on January 31, 2013. The website ended service on December 27, 2013, and the series resumed on the Tonari no Young Jump website on January 17, 2014. Shueisha collected its chapters in three tankōbon volumes, with the first one released on May 19, 2014; the third volume was released on June 17, 2016, while the series concluded on Tonari no Young Jump a week later on June 24.

A ten-page special crossover chapter with Somato's next manga series, Shadows House, titled "Shadows House × Kuro" (シャドーハウス × 黒, Shadō Hausu Kuro), was published in Young Jump Heroine on August 10, 2022. A three-volume shinsōban edition of Kuro, which includes the crossover chapter in the third volume, was released by Shueisha on January 19, 2026.

In October 2025, Yen Press announced that it had licensed the manga for English release in North America. The series was released in a 392-pages "Complete Edition" volume on May 26, 2026.

=== Volumes ===
No.	Original release date	Original ISBN	English release date	English ISBN
1	May 19, 2014	978-4-08-879833-2	May 26, 2026	979-8-8554-1441-7
2	March 19, 2015	978-4-08-890117-6	May 26, 2026	979-8-8554-1441-7
3	June 17, 2016	978-4-08-890361-3	May 26, 2026	979-8-8554-1441-7

== Reception ==
The series ranked tenth in the 2016 Next Manga Award's web category.
