= Tsubasa (Eir Aoi song) =

- The regular edition cover

Single by Eir Aoi

from the album Best -E-
- B-side: "Carry Out"
- Released: July 17, 2016 (digital); July 20, 2016
- Recorded: 2017
- Studio: Rokubancho Studio (Tokyo, Japan)
- Genre: J-pop
- Length: 3:24
- Label: SME Record
- Composer: Ryuhey Yamada
- Lyricist: Uki

Eir Aoi singles chronology
| "Accentier" (2016) | "Tsubasa" (2016) | "Ryūsei / Yakusoku" (2018) |

Alternative cover
- The limited anime edition cover

Music video
- Tsubasa on YouTube

"Tsubasa" (翼, Wings) is a song by Japanese pop singer Eir Aoi. It was released as thirteenth single digitally on July 17, 2016, and received a physical release on July 20, 2016. It reached number 9 on Oricon and number 5 on Japan Hot 100. It was used as the opening theme song for the second season of anime series The Heroic Legend of Arslan. The song was released before her indefinite hiatus in November 2016, although she would resume her activities in 2018.

== Release and reception ==
On 5 June 2016, the official website of the anime The Heroic Legend of Arslan revealed about the opening theme song for the second season "Tsubasa" that would be sung by Eir Aoi. The song was released digitally on July 17, 2016, and received a physical release on July 20, 2016, on three edition; Regular edition, Limited edition and Limited anime edition. The single reached number 9 on Oricon, 5 on Japan Hot 100, and 2 on Japan Hot Animation with spent 9, 9 and 7 weeks respectively. In August 2016, "Tsubasa" was certified gold by the Recording Industry Association of Japan (RIAJ) for 100,000 full-track ringtone digital music downloads (Chaku Uta Full). The song was featured in her greatest hits album "Best -E-". The single also featured the cover of Do As Infinity song "Fukai Mori".

== Music video ==
The music video for "Tsubasa" was directed by Hideaki Sunaga. The video features Eir Aoi sing in land when the battlefield is take place, as some scene show some soldier fighting each other. Some scene also show Eir Aoi sing in the castle with some soldiers. Also, some scene show the angel in a castle, with feather of the wing from the angel spread out, and some scene also show the dragon seen on the battlefield, make the soldiers unite to defeat it. The video end when Eir Aoi stop sing with the angel, the dragon, and the soldiers feature in the scene, with the logo of the song also show in the scene.

== Track listing ==
=== Regular edition ===
CD
| No. | Title | Length |
|---|---|---|
| 1. | "Tsubasa" (翼 Wings) | 3:24 |
| 2. | "CARRY OUT" | 3:50 |
| 3. | "Fukai Mori" (Do As Infinity Cover) | 4:26 |
| 4. | "Tsubasa" (翼 Wings) (Instrumental) | 3:23 |

=== Limited edition ===
CD
| No. | Title | Length |
|---|---|---|
| 1. | "Tsubasa" (翼 Wings) | 3:24 |
| 2. | "CARRY OUT" | 3:50 |
| 3. | "Fukai Mori" (Do As Infinity Cover) | 4:26 |
| 4. | "Tsubasa" (翼 Wings) (Instrumental) | 3:23 |

DVD
| No. | Title | Length |
|---|---|---|
| 1. | "Tsubasa" (music video) | 3:33 |
| 2. | "Making of "Tsubasa"" |
| 3. | "Eir in New York City the movie" |

=== Limited anime edition ===
CD
| No. | Title | Length |
|---|---|---|
| 1. | "Tsubasa" (翼 Wings) | 3:24 |
| 2. | "CARRY OUT" | 3:50 |
| 3. | "Fukai Mori" (Do As Infinity Cover) | 4:26 |
| 4. | "Tsubasa" (翼 Wings) (The Heroic Legend of Arslan Second Season OP ver) | 1:31 |

== Personnel ==
Singer and bands

- Eir Aoi – vocals, lyrics ("Carry Out")
- Uki – lyrics ("Tsubasa")
- Hiroo Yamaguchi – bass
- Yuya Komoguchi, Tokunaga brothers – guitar
- Taro Yoshida – drums
- Hitoshi Konno - Violin
- Yusuke Kato – arranger, other instruments

Production

- Jun Ozawa, Yoshihiko Ohta – record
- Satoshi Morishige, Yoshihiko Ohta – mixer
- Hidekazu Sakai – mastering

== Charts ==
| Year | Chart | Peak position |
|---|---|---|
| 2016 | Oricon | 9 |
| 2016 | Japan Hot 100 | 5 |
| 2016 | Japan Hot Animation | 2 |

== Certifications ==
| Region | Certification | Certified units/sales |
|---|---|---|
| Japan (RIAJ) | Gold | 100,000^{*} |
^{*} Sales figures based on certification alone.

== Release history ==
| Region | Date | Label | Format | Catalog |
|---|---|---|---|---|
| Japan | 20 July 2016 | SME Record | CD | SECL-1942 |
| Japan | 20 July 2016 | SME Record | CD | SECL-1943 |
| Japan | 20 July 2016 | SME Record | CD+DVD | SECL-1940 |
