= Ignite (Eir Aoi song) =

Single by Eir Aoi

from the album D'Azur
- Released: August 20, 2014
- Recorded: 2014
- Genre: J-pop; anisong; electronic rock
- Length: 4:04:00
- Label: SME Records
- Songwriters: Eir; Tomoyuki Ogawa
- Producer: Saku

Eir Aoi singles chronology
| "Niji no Oto" (2014) | "Ignite" (2014) | "Tsunagarunouta" (2014) |

Music video
- Short Ver. on YouTube

"Ignite" is a song recorded by Japanese singer Eir Aoi, serving as her seventh major-label single. Written and composed by Saku (with arrangement also credited to Saku), the track was officially released on August 20, 2014, under the SME Records label.

== Background and release ==
"Ignite" was released as Eir Aoi's seventh single on August 20, 2014, through SME Records.

== Composition and lyrics ==
"Ignite" is an up-tempo electronic rock and J-pop song, with a duration of four minutes and four seconds. It is composed in the key of G minor at a tempo of 171 beats per minute. The song structure follows a standard verse-chorus form, opening with a distorted synthesizer motif that leads into a guitar-driven arrangement. The bridge features a prominent string quartet (viola, two violins, and cello) which contrasts with the song's electronic elements.

The lyrics, co-written by Eir Aoi and Tomoyuki Ogawa, utilize themes of "fire" and "ignition" as metaphors for internal resolve. According to Aoi, the song was written to reflect the psychological state of the character Kirito and his struggle with past trauma during the "Phantom Bullet" arc of Sword Art Online II.

== Media appearances and usage ==
Beyond its primary use as the first opening theme (OP1) for Sword Art Online II, the song has been featured in several other media formats:

- Video games: The song appears as a playable track in various rhythm games, including BanG Dream! Girls Band Party! (covered by the band Roselia) and the mobile game Sword Art Online: Integral Factor.
- Remixes: In 2021, an official remix by Fairlane was released on the SACRA MUSIC "Sacra Beats" YouTube channel, reimagining the track as a modern future bass composition.
- Karaoke: The track consistently ranked within the top 10 most-requested anime songs on Japanese karaoke platforms like DAM and Joysound throughout 2014 and 2015.

== Cover versions ==
Due to its commercial success, "Ignite" has been covered by numerous artists:

- Roselia: The fictional band from the BanG Dream! franchise included a cover of the song in the mobile game and on their 2018 album Anfang.
- English-language covers: Notable English interpretations have been produced by YouTubers AmaLee ( Amanda Lee) and PelleK, with Lee's version appearing on her album Nostalgia VII.
- The First Take: Aoi performed a special acoustic arrangement of the song for the YouTube series The First Take, which was later released as a standalone digital single.

== Production ==
The track's production involved the following creative and technical personnel:

- Songwriting: Eir (lyrics), Tomoyuki Ogawa (music/lyrics)
- Arrangement & Guitar: Saku
- Musicians: Takashi Okamura (bass), Daichi Hamasaki (drums), Yasuko Murata (viola), Yoko Fujinawa (violin)
- Engineering: Satoshi Morishige (recording), Hayashi Kenichi (mixing), Hidekazu Sakai (mastering)
- Executive Producers: Shunsuke Muramatsu, Daisuke Katsurada

== Music video and live performances ==
The music video for "Ignite" was filmed in mid-2014 and features Aoi performing in a high-contrast environment utilizing pyrotechnic effects and silhouette lighting, intended to parallel the "fire" and "light" metaphors within the lyrics. The visual production was handled by the following staff:

- Art Direction: Takuya Nakashiro (BUCCI)
- Photography: Makoto Okuguchi
- Styling: Tatsuhiko Marumoto
- Hair & Make-up: NOBU

A short version of the video was published to YouTube on July 11, 2014, eventually accumulating over 10 million views before being supplemented by higher-resolution digital releases.

Aoi has performed "Ignite" at several major domestic and international venues, including:

- Nippon Budokan (2015/2018): The song was a central fixture in her "World of Blue" (2015) and "Re Blue" (2018) special live concerts following her return from hiatus.
- ABU TV Song Festival (2018): Aoi represented Japan at the festival in Ashgabat, Turkmenistan, where she performed the track for an international broadcast audience.
- THE FIRST TAKE (2020): On August 28, 2020, Aoi appeared on the YouTube series The First Take, performing a stripped-back arrangement of "Ignite" in a single take. The performance emphasized the vocal technicality of the chorus and was later released as a digital single.

== Reception ==
The single peaked at number one on the Billboard Japan Hot 100 and reached number nine on the Oricon Weekly Singles Chart. It received a Platinum certification from the Recording Industry Association of Japan (RIAJ) for exceeding 250,000 digital downloads. Retrospective commentary has noted the song's high vocal difficulty, specifically regarding the sustained high notes required in live performances.

== Release history ==
| Region | Date | Format | Label | Catalog | Edition |
|---|---|---|---|---|---|
| Japan | August 20, 2014 | CD+DVD | SME Records | SECL-1552/3 | Limited Edition |
| Japan | August 20, 2014 | CD | SME Records | SECL-1554 | Regular Edition |
| Japan | August 20, 2014 | CD+DVD | SME Records | SECL-1555/6 | Limited Anime Edition |
| Japan | August 20, 2014 | Digital download | SME Records | — | Standard Edition |
| Taiwan | August 20, 2014 | CD+DVD | Sony Music | 88875010992 | Standard Edition |

== Certifications and commercial impact ==
Following its release, "Ignite" achieved significant commercial milestones within the Japanese digital music market. The song was noted for its longevity on the charts, appearing in the Billboard Japan Hot 100 Year-End list for 2014 at number 46, a high position for an anime-themed single released in the latter half of the year.

The single's digital performance led to multiple certifications by the Recording Industry Association of Japan (RIAJ). Initially certified Gold in 2015, the track's continued popularity resulted in an upgrade to Platinum status in January 2019, signifying over 250,000 verified paid downloads. In the context of the Sword Art Online franchise's discography, "Ignite" remains one of the highest-certified singles, alongside works by LiSA.

| Country | Certification | Certified units/sales |
|---|---|---|
| Japan (RIAJ) | Platinum | 250,000 (Digital downloads) |
| Japan (RIAJ) | Gold | 100,000 (Streaming) |
