= List of Shadows House characters =

A selection of the characters from the series

The Japanese manga series Shadows House series features an extensive cast of characters created by the manga artist duo Somato.

== Living Dolls ==
Living Dolls (生き人形, Iki Ningyō) are the servants of the Shadows, with each Shadow master having their own Doll. The Doll and their master have an identical silhouette and differ merely in their presence (or absence) of a face and their clothes. The Living Dolls are revealed to be humans that have all been abducted from a place called Mirrorside Village next to the Shadows House. Due to the Shadows House's production of charcoal for the village as an energy source, the villagers are all brainwashed into believing that letting their children work for the House is an ultimate bliss. All children from the village are trained by the school to be selected for by the third floor Shadows, with the exception of Emilico.

=== Emilico ===
Voiced by: Yū Sasahara (Japanese); Dani Chambers (English)

Emilico (エミリコ, Emiriko) is Kate's Living Doll, named after the protagonist of a storybook Kate enjoyed. Emilico is characterized by her cheerful, optimistic and kind demeanour, as well as her tendency to try and help anyone she can. Outside of being Kate's Living Doll, she is a member of Cleaning Squad 10 with Lou, Rosemary and Mia, and later becomes its leader. Despite sharing very different personalities, she and Kate get along very well. As they pry deeper into the secrets of the Shadows House, she begins to regain memories of her former life as a tightrope walker in a travelling circus, when she was invited to enter the House by Shaun, Lou, Ricky and Rum.

=== Shaun ===
Voiced by: Kōdai Sakai (Japanese); Jordan Dash Cruz (English)

Shaun (ショーン, Shōn) is an intelligent and steadfast boy who is John's Living Doll. While initially put under the effects of the brainwashing coffee, a fist-fight with John brings him back to his senses. He becomes Emilico and Kate's closest companion alongside his master as they rebel against the Shadows House. His original name is John, and he used to be the oldest of three siblings and the head of their class back in Mirrorside Village.

=== Lou ===
Voiced by: Ayane Sakura (Japanese); Marisa Duran (English)

Lou (ルウ, Rū) is a quiet, obedient girl who is Louise's Living Doll. While portrayed as listless most of the time, Lou is very determined and resolute when she sets her mind to things. Her original name is Louise.

=== Ricky ===
Voiced by: Reiji Kawashima (Japanese); Adam McArthur (English)

Ricky (リッキー, Rikkī) is Patrick's Living Doll who is first portrayed to be just as arrogant and prideful as his master, but as he warms up to the rest of the debutante class shows a more sensitive and kind personality. He later becomes enamoured with Lou. His original name is Patrick.

=== Rum ===
Voiced by: Shino Shimoji (Japanese); Risa Mei (English)

Rum (ラム, Ramu) is a shy, reserved Living Doll who seldom converses with anyone, even her master Shirley. After failing the debut, Rum is seemingly destroyed as a defective tool, later speculated to have been turned into a Faceless. She is revealed to have retained her sense of self thanks to Shirley, and becomes an insider for Kate's rebellion. Her original name is Shirley.

=== Mia ===
Voiced by: Saori Ōnishi (Japanese); Emily Fajardo (English)

Mia (ミア) is a sassy and playful girl who is Sarah's Living Doll. She is the second-in-command of Cleaning Squad 10 below Rosemary, and a mentor-figure to Emilico upon the latter's arrival into Shadows House. When Emilico becomes the leader of the squad instead of her, Mia shows hints of jealousy.

=== Rosemary ===
Voiced by: Mai Nakahara (Japanese); Michelle Lee (English)

Rosemary (ローズマリー, Rōzumarī) is a sisterly and gentle girl who is Maryrose's Living Doll. She is the former leader of Cleaning Squad 10 and a mentor-figure to both Lou and Emilico upon their arrival into Shadows House. Refusing to go to the adults' wing, she commits suicide with her master.

=== Barbie ===
Voiced by: Rie Kugimiya (Japanese); Elizabeth Maxwell (English)

Barbie (バービー, Bābī) is a violent, brusque and bad-tempered girl who is Barbara's Living Doll. Due to her master being the head of the Star Bearers and the Shadows House's largest soot producer, she is also the head of all the Cleaning Squads. Before debuting, Barbie used to be a cheerful and innocent girl who was best friends with Rosemary. However, Anthony's departure and Rosemary refusing to divulge anything to her resulted in her becoming cold and harsh.

=== Anthony ===
Voiced by: Kensho Ono (Japanese); Dallas Reid (English)

Anthony (アンソニー, Ansonī) is a young man who once worked as a servant in the Shadows House and as the Living Doll of Christopher.

=== Belle ===
Voiced by: Rumi Okubo (Japanese); Alexis Tipton (English)

Belle (ベル, Berū) is the name shared by a pair of twins who are Isabelle and Mirabelle's Living Dolls. Uncaring and arrogant, they used to be on Rum's Cleaning Squad and bullied other Living Dolls, but were later moved to Emilico's after Rum's departure. After accidentally breaking the bottles of coffee that were meant to brainwash the children, they are punished to clean the soot room filled with clingers. The effect of the clingers and cyclical vomiting eventually causes one of the Belle twins to die, leaving only one twin to act as a Doll for two masters. Grief-stricken at the loss of her sister, Belle eventually grows closer to Emilico and her kindness.

== Shadows ==
Shadows (シャドー, Shadō) are an enigmatic race inhabiting Shadows House. They are beings without faces, their true forms concealed beneath a perpetual shroud of black soot. To the outside world, they are represented by their Living Dolls, who serve as their voices and faces. Living in a grand mansion that mimics the world of humans, Shadows engage in a peculiar imitation of human society, complete with a hierarchical structure and social customs. However, their lives are far from ordinary. A constant battle against the ever-present soot defines their existence, as they and their surroundings are perpetually covered in the dark substance.

=== Kate Mirror ===
Voiced by: Akari Kitō (Japanese); Emi Lo (English)

Kate Mirror (ケイト・ミラー, Keito Mirā) is the Shadow of Emilico. Her intelligence and calm demeanour make her an expert at problem solving and keeping a clear head in difficult situations, effectively the opposite of Emilico's more outspoken and naive personality. While somewhat distant at first, Kate quickly grows attached to Emilico, enjoying their time together. She immediately takes it upon herself to break Emilico's brainwashing, and uses her soot powers to save her on multiple occasions. Suspicious about the Shadows House and its hierarchy, Kate slowly gains allies with Emilico to organise a rebellion against the manor. Kate is revealed to be the daughter of Lady Catherine, a human noble who once lived in the Mirrors House and subsequently became a Shadow. Her soot ability enables her to move objects from a distance.

=== John ===
Voiced by: Kōdai Sakai (Japanese); Jordan Dash Cruz (English)

John (ジョン, Jon) is the Shadow of Shaun. Unlike Shaun, John is free-spirited and honest, preferring to dive-in headfirst into a problem without prior thoughts. He falls in love with Kate at first sight and proceeds to propose to her. Like Kate and Emilico, he and Shaun get along very well and care for each other greatly. His soot ability is collecting a massive amount of soot on his fist and launching it. He is able to destroy objects as tough as a giant boulder at close range but his ability gets progressively weaker as it travels forward.

=== Louise ===
Voiced by: Ayane Sakura (Japanese); Marisa Duran (English)

Louise (ルイーズ, Ruīzu) is the Shadow of Lou. She has an open, ditzy and narcissistic personality, making her very fond of Lou for her face. While selfish and initially seemingly uncaring towards Lou, she begins to appreciate Lou's human qualities and care for her wellbeing. Her soot ability allows her to control others if her soot is consumed.

=== Patrick ===
Voiced by: Reiji Kawashima (Japanese); Adam McArthur (English)

Patrick (パトリック, Patorikku) is the Shadow of Ricky. Like his Living Doll, he is prideful, arrogant and always tries to create an air of nobility around himself, yet secretly gentle and sensitive. Unusual for a Shadow, Patrick relies heavily on Ricky to make decisions and how to present himself. Due to his weak soot powers compared to the rest of the debutante class, he grows very insecure about himself. He falls in love with Emilico due to her kindness during the debut.

=== Shirley ===
Voiced by: Shino Shimoji (Japanese); Risa Mei (English)

Shirley (シャーリー, Shārī) is the Shadow of Rum. Silent and seemingly lacking a personality, Shirley was not able to fully mimic Rum due to her being an introvert. She is the only one to fail the debut and seemingly dies, but actually reverts into back into her morph form. As a morph she has been able to sneak around the house and collect information regarding the truth about the Shadows. Her soot ability is shape-shifting into objects and beings around her size. When she transforms into a ribbon and wrap around Rum's finger they are able to communicate via thoughts.

=== Sarah ===
Voiced by: Saori Ōnishi (Japanese); Emily Fajardo (English)

Sarah (サラ, Sara) is the Shadow of Mia. Sarah is cruel, selfish and only concerned about elevating through the ranks of the house. She secretly physically abuses Mia in order to motivate her to become better for her sake. Throughout the story Sarah has always looked down upon Kate but this becomes full hatred after Kate becomes a group leader, later becoming a spy for Edward.

=== Maryrose ===
Voiced by: Mai Nakahara (Japanese); Michelle Lee (English)

Maryrose (マリーローズ, Marīrōzu) is the Shadow of Rosemary. Initially introduced as a caring individual towards her juniors, she is revealed to have been the perpetrator of both ghost incidents that have happened since Emilico's arrival. As a special morph she can remember her time as a morph and knows the truth about the house, carrying out the incidents in order to lure out like-minded people to escape together and postpone her advancement into the adult wing. In the end, she was caught by Kate and handed over to the Star Bearers. After a brief fight with Edward and losing, she and Rosemary seemingly commits suicide and jump off a bridge.

=== Barbara ===
Voiced by: Rie Kugimiya (Japanese); Elizabeth Maxwell (English)

Barbara (バーバラ, Bābara) is the Shadow of Barbie. As the leader of the Star Bearers she is in essence the head of the children house. She is able to produce an enormous amount of soot and is seen as an invaluable asset. However, since only children can produce soot for the house, her advancement into the adult house is constantly delayed.

=== Isabelle and Mirabelle ===
Voiced by: Rumi Okubo (Japanese); Alexis Tipton (English)

Isabelle (イザベル, Izaberu) and Mirabelle (ミラベル, Miraberu) are the Shadows of the Belle Twins. Like their Living Dolls, they are selfish and rude and enjoy bullying the Living Dolls of other Shadows, typically using their soot power which gives them the ability to control any human's movements. With the death of one of their Dolls, the twins now share the same Doll. They eventually grow to trust and like Kate.

=== Christopher ===
Voiced by: Kensho Ono (Japanese); Dallas Reid (English)

Christopher (クリストファー, Kurisutofā) was once a leader of the Star Bearers and the Shadow of Anthony.

== Adults ==
The adults of the Shadows House are its masters and live separately from the children and their Living Dolls in the adults wing, also known as the Great-Grandfather's wing. They consist of all those who have passed the debut and underwent unification with their Living Doll, creating a "perfect existence" of a Shadow with their Doll's face. Members of the adults wing are organised by rank into three different floors, with those on the third floor able to live alongside the Great-Grandfather and thus possess the highest authority.

=== Edward ===
Voiced by: Wataru Hatano (Japanese); Christopher Corey Smith (English)

Edward (エドワード, Edowādo) is the newest caretaker of the children's wing and a member of the second floor. He was first introduced as the judge of Kate and her class's debut. Wary and highly suspicious, he believes Kate is a dissident trying to destroy the house. His goal is to advance to the third floor so he can be closer to Great-Grandfather. His soot ability is to manipulate sound and vibrate air using soot.

=== Aileen ===
Voiced by: Yui Horie (Japanese); Anastasia Muñoz (English)

Aileen (アイリーン, Airīn) is a member of the second floor. She and Gerald cooperate with Edward in setting up the debutante and advancing to the third floor. Her soot ability is to create crows from soot that can be used to deliver messages.

=== Gerald ===
Voiced by: Takeo Ōtsuka (Japanese); Cory Phillips (English)

Gerald (ジェラルド, Jerarudo) is a member of the second floor. He and Aileen cooperate with Edward in setting up the debutante and advancing to the third floor.

=== Ryan ===
Voiced by: Daisuke Kishio (Japanese); Jason Liebrecht (English)

Ryan (ライアン, Raian) is a member of the third floor and a hot-tempered and violent man. He was first introduced as one of the observers of the debutante.

=== Dorothy ===
Voiced by: Yoko Hikasa (Japanese); Vanessa DeSilvio (English)

Dorothy (ドロシー, Doroshī) is a member of the third floor and a voluptuous and ruthless woman. She was first introduced as one of the observers of the debutante.

=== Joseph ===
Voiced by: Kenta Miyake (Japanese); Brent Mukai (English)

Joseph (ジョゼフ, Jozefu) is a member of the third floor who is always seen with a monocle and a pipe. He was first introduced as one of the observers of the debutante.

=== Sophie ===
Voiced by: Yumiri Hanamori (Japanese); Alex Moore (English)

Sophie (ソフィ, Sofi) is a member of the third floor who is typically calm and listless, but shows a maniacal hunger when confronted with soot. She was first introduced as one of the observers of the debutante. Her soot ability likely has something to do with butterflies.
