= Ryūsei (Eir Aoi song) =

- The regular edition cover

Single by Eir Aoi

from the album Fragment
- A-side: "Yakusoku" (double A-side)
- Released: April 22, 2018 (digital); June 13, 2018
- Recorded: 2017
- Studio: Sony Music Studio (Tokyo, Japan)
- Genre: J-pop
- Length: 4:13
- Label: Sacra Music
- Composer: Kohei Tsunami
- Lyricists: Eir Aoi, Kohei Tsunami

Eir Aoi singles chronology
"Tsubasa" (2016)	"Ryūsei" / "Yakusoku" (2018)	"Iris" (2018)

Alternative cover
- The limited anime edition cover

Music video
- 流星 on YouTube

"Ryūsei" (流星, Meteor) is a song by Japanese pop singer Eir Aoi. It was released digitally on April 22, 2018, and received a physical release together with the song "Yakusoku" on June 13, 2018, as her fourteenth single. It reached number 8 on Oricon and number 10 on Japan Hot 100. It was used as the opening theme song of anime series Sword Art Online Alternative Gun Gale Online. The single also mark her return from her hiatus, and also mark as her first double A-side single.

== Release and reception ==
On 8 February 2018, it was announced that she would resume her activities after her hiatus with the release of the music video "Yakusoku" (約束, Promise) on YouTube. This was confirmed on 7 March 2018 that her next release would be the opening theme to anime Sword Art Online Alternative Gun Gale Online, titled "Ryūsei" (流星, Meteor). The song was released digitally on April 22, 2018, and received a physical release together with the song "Yakusoku" on June 13, 2018, as her fourteenth single on three edition; Regular edition, Limited edition and Limited anime edition. The single reached number 8 on Oricon, 10 on Japan Hot 100, and 1 on Japan Hot Animation with spent 10, 20 and 13 weeks respectively. In June 2018, "Ryūsei" was certified gold by the Recording Industry Association of Japan (RIAJ) for 100,000 full-track ringtone digital music downloads (Chaku Uta Full). The song placed in 6th on Newtype Anime Awards for 2018 best theme song, The song was featured in her fourth album "Fragment".

== Music video ==
The music video for "Ryūsei" was directed by Takashi Tadokoro. The video features a girl with school uniform that was writing in her notebook on some school. After she finish writing, she torn a page that she was writing before and start to cry (it is revealed that she is writing a word "meteor", indicating that she want to see a meteor). Some scene featuring the girl running from her school to some place where the meteor and star can be seen. The video also feature Eir Aoi singing in the music studio. The video end when the girl finally can see a meteor on sky with the view of the city, smiling as the meteor faded away.

== Track listing ==
=== Regular edition ===
CD
No.	Title	Length
1.	"Ryūsei" (流星 Meteor)	4:13
2.	"Yakusoku" (約束 Promise)	4:47
3.	"Hitokakera no Yuuki" (ヒトカケラの勇気 A Piece of Courage)	3:52
4.	"Ryūsei" (流星 Meteor) (Instrumental)	4:11

=== Limited edition ===
CD
No.	Title	Length
1.	"Ryūsei" (流星 Meteor)	4:13
2.	"Yakusoku" (約束 Promise)	4:47
3.	"Hitokakera no Yuuki" (ヒトカケラの勇気 A Piece of Courage)	3:52
4.	"Ryūsei" (流星 Meteor) (Instrumental)	4:11

DVD
No.	Title	Length
1.	"Ryūsei" (music video)	4:11
2.	"Yakusoku" (music video)	4:45

=== Limited anime edition ===
CD
No.	Title	Length
1.	"Ryūsei" (流星 Meteor)	4:13
2.	"Yakusoku" (約束 Promise)	4:47
3.	"Hitokakera no Yuuki" (ヒトカケラの勇気 A Piece of Courage)	3:52
4.	"Ryūsei" (流星 Meteor) (Sword Art Online Alternative Gun Gale Online OP ver)	1:29

DVD
No.	Title	Length
1.	"Ryūsei" (Sword Art Online Alternative Gun Gale Online opening version without credit)	1:30

== Personnel ==
Singer and bands

- Eir Aoi – vocals, lyrics ("Ryūsei", "Yakusoku")
- Kohei Tsunami, Ryosuke Shigenaga, Katsuhiko Kurosu – lyrics
- Kohei Tsunami – bass, arranger, other instruments
- Takumi Sone – guitar

Production

- Satoshi Morishige – record
- Kenichi Koga – mixer

== Charts ==
Year	Chart	Peak position (shared with Yakusoku)
2018	Oricon	10
2018	Japan Hot 100	8
2018	Japan Hot Animation	1

== Certifications ==
Region	Certification	Certified units/sales
Japan (RIAJ)	Gold	100,000^{*}
^{*} Sales figures based on certification alone.

== Release history ==
Region	Date	Label	Format	Catalog
Japan	13 June 2018	Sacra Music	CD	VVCL-1255
Japan	13 June 2018	Sacra Music	CD+DVD	VVCL-1252
Japan	13 June 2018	Sacra Music	CD+DVD	VVCL-1256

== Awards and nominations ==
Year	Award	Category	Result
2018	Newtype Anime Awards	Best Theme Song	6th place
