= Eir Aoi =

Japanese singer (born 1988)

- 藍井 エイル
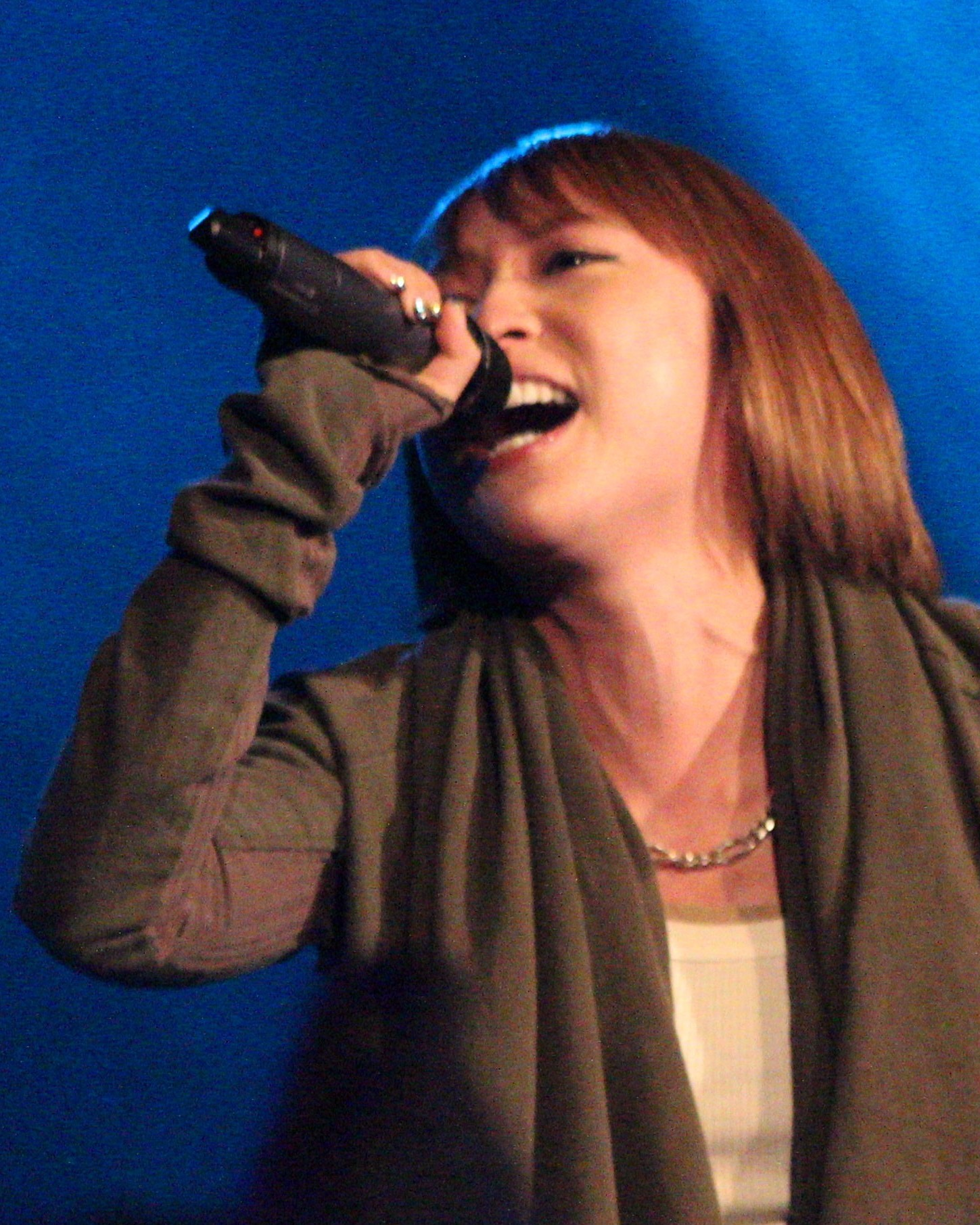
- Eir Aoi at Hyper Japan Festival 2015, London
- Born: November 30, 1988 (age 37); Sapporo, Japan
- Occupations: Singer, Songwriter
- Years active: 2011–2016; 2018–2023; 2024–present
- Musical career
- Genres: J-pop; anison; pop rock
- Instruments: Vocals, Guitar
- Labels: SME Records (2011–2016); Sacra Music (2018–2023); Lantis (2026–)
- Website: www.aoieir.com

Eir Aoi (Japanese: 藍井 エイル, Hepburn: Aoi Eiru; born November 30, 1988) is a Japanese singer from Sapporo, Hokkaido, signed to Sacra Music. After being discovered through the Japanese video sharing website Niconico, Aoi made her major debut in 2011 with the release of her first single "Memoria", which was used as the first ending theme to the 2011 anime television series Fate/Zero.

Aoi's music has been featured in various anime television series such as Sword Art Online, Classroom of the Elite, Kill la Kill, and The Heroic Legend of Arslan, as well as other television programs such as Rank Okoku. She has performed at various anime conventions in Asia, Europe, North and South America. She has cited her interest in anime, as well as artists such as Evanescence, Slipknot, and Do As Infinity, as influences in her career. In October 2016, following prolonged bouts of poor health, she announced an indefinite hiatus from musical activities following a two-day concert at the Nippon Budokan in November 2016. In February 2018, it was announced that she would resume her activities later that year.

== Biography ==
=== Early life and career ===
She had an interest in music since her childhood, and learned to play the guitar while in junior high school. As part of pursuing a career as a musician, she formed a band during her high school years. At one point when she felt that her dream of becoming a musician was fading away, she considered pursuing a career as a nurse. As she did not want to give up on her dreams, she decided to upload videos of her singing online. Her music break came after being discovered through the Japanese video sharing site Niconico. She first released the song "Frozen Eyez", which was included in a 2011 issue of the magazine LisAni!.

=== Major debut ===
Aoi made her major debut under SME Records with the release of the single "Memoria" on October 19, 2011, the title track of which was used as the first ending theme song to the 2011 anime series Fate/Zero. Her second single "Aurora", which was released on September 5, 2012, is used as the fourth opening theme song to the 2011 anime series Mobile Suit Gundam AGE. She released the mini-album Prayer on April 11, 2012; the album includes seven image songs for Fate/Zero. Her third single "Innocence", which was released on November 21, 2012, was used as the second opening theme song to the 2012 anime series Sword Art Online. Her first full album, Blau, was released on January 30, 2013; the album peaked at No. 4 on Oricon's weekly charted and charted for seven weeks. She made an appearance at Seattle's Sakura-Con anime convention in March 2013, performing her first three singles.

Aoi's fourth single "Cobalt Sky", was released on June 26, 2013. Her fifth single, "Sirius", was released on November 13, 2013, and was used as the first opening theme to the 2013 anime series Kill la Kill. Her song "Sanbika", released on the same single as "Sirius", was used as an insert song throughout the series. Her sixth single, "Niji no Oto" (虹の音, Sound of the Rainbow), which was released on January 1, 2014, was used as the opening theme to the special Sword Art Online: Extra Edition. She released her second album Aube on January 29, 2014; the album peaked at No. 6 on the Oricon weekly charts and charted for eight weeks. Her seventh single "Ignite", released on August 20, 2014, was used as the first opening theme to the 2014 anime series Sword Art Online II. Her eighth single "Tsunagaru Omoi", released on November 12, 2014, was used as the opening theme for the TBS show Rank Okoku.

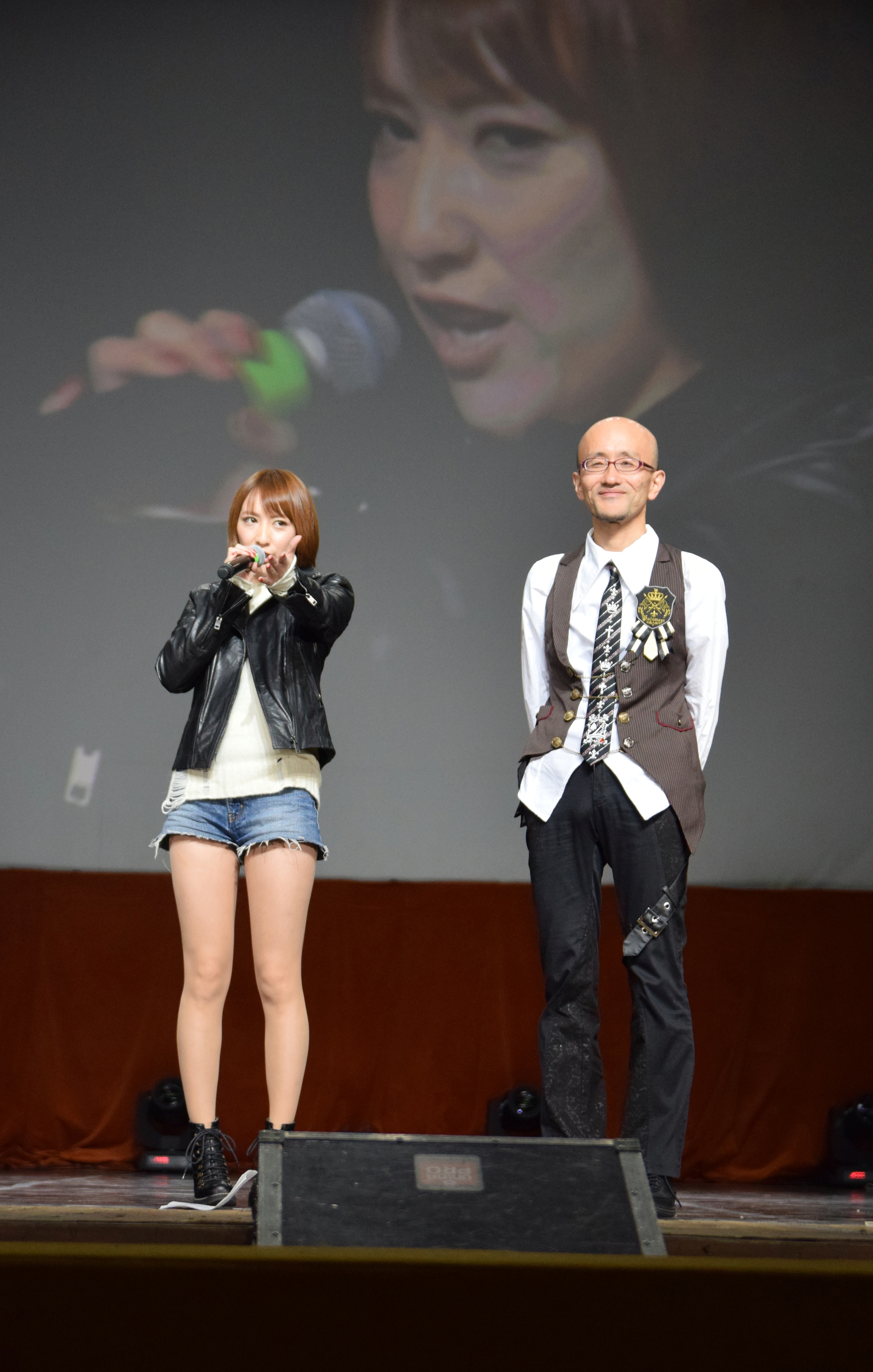
Aoi in Saint Petersburg, Russia, in 2014

Aoi's ninth single, "Genesis", released on February 18, 2015, is used as the ending theme to the 2015 anime series Aldnoah Zero:2nd Season. In March 2015, she appeared at the anime convention Kawaii Kon in Honolulu, Hawaiʻi. Her tenth single "Lapis Lazuli", released on April 22, 2015, was used as the ending theme to the 2015 anime series The Heroic Legend of Arslan. She released the digital single "Cynthia no Hikari" (シンシアの光, Cynthia's Light) on March 25, 2015; the title track is used as the opening theme of the 2015 video game Sword Art Online: Lost Song. Her third album D'Azur was released on June 24, 2015; the album peaked at No. 4 on the Oricon weekly charts and charted for fifteen weeks. Due to a sudden illness, she cancelled a scheduled appearance at Animelo Summer Live in August 2015, although she pushed through with appearances in the Philippines, Hong Kong, Taiwan, and Singapore later that year. Her eleventh single, "Shoegazer", was released on October 28, 2015.

Aoi released her twelfth single "Accentier", was released on March 2, 2016, and is used as the opening theme for the PlayStation Vita/PlayStation 4 game Digimon World: Next Order. Her thirteenth single "Tsubasa" (翼, Wings) was released on July 20, 2016, and was used as the opening theme for The Heroic Legend of Arslan: Dust Storm Dance. Her first and second greatest hits albums titled Best -E- and Best -A-, were released on October 19, 2016, in commemoration of the 5th anniversary of her career. Best -E- includes "Tsubasa", "Innocence", "Genesis", "Memoria", and "Cynthia no Hikari"; Best -A- includes "Lapis Lazuli", "Aurora", "Ignite", "Accentier", "Sirius", "Cobalt Sky", "Niji no Oto", and "Frozen Eyez".

=== Hiatus and return ===
On August 17, 2016, it was announced on her official Facebook page that she would put her career on hiatus due to poor health. Her remaining appearances for 2016 and a scheduled performance at Anime Festival Indonesia 2016, Animax Musix 2017 in Osaka in January 2017 were cancelled. On October 14, 2016, her management announced that she would put her musical career on indefinite hiatus following a final two concerts at Nippon Budokan on November 4 and 5, 2016.

On February 1, 2018, her website updated with an image of a flashing blue light. This was followed by an announcement on February 8 that she would resume her activities with the release of the music video "Yakusoku" (約束, Promise) on YouTube. Her management also announced that she had transferred to the music label Sacra Music. It was confirmed on March 7, 2018, that her next release would be the opening theme to anime Sword Art Online Alternative Gun Gale Online, titled "Ryūsei" (流星, Meteor). The song "Ryūsei" was released digitally on April 22, 2018, and received a physical release together with the song "Yakusoku" on June 13, 2018, as her fourteenth single. She held a concert at the Nippon Budokan to commemorate the resumption of her activities. Her fifteenth single "Iris" (アイリス) was released on October 24, 2018; the song is used as the first ending theme to the anime series Sword Art Online: Alicization. Her fourth album Fragment was released on April 17, 2019. Her sixteenth single "Tsuki o Ou Mayonaka" (月を追う真夜中, Following the Moon in the Middle of the Night) was released digitally on July 6, 2019, and received a physical release on August 28, 2019; the title song is used as the opening theme to the anime series Granbelm. Her seventeenth single "Hoshi ga Furu Yume" (星が降るユメ, Dream Of a Falling Star) was released digitally on October 19, 2019, and received a physical release on November 27, 2019; the title song is used as the ending theme to the anime series Fate/Grand Order - Absolute Demonic Front: Babylonia. She released her eighteenth single "I will..." digitally on July 20, 2020, and received a physical release on August 12, 2020; the title song is used as the ending theme of television series anime Sword Art Online: Alicization - War of Underworld: Part 2 . (Note: This single was originally scheduled to be released on June 3, 2020, but was delayed due to the postponement of the anime. The anime is getting delayed due to COVID-19 pandemic.) Her nineteenth single "Kodo" was released digitally on April 3, 2021, and received a physical release on June 16, 2021, the title song is used as the 2nd opening theme to the anime series Back Arrow. She released the single "Hello Hello Hello" on August 17, 2022; the title song is used as the 2nd ending theme to the anime series A Couple of Cuckoos.

In January 2023, Aoi's management announced she would be taking a temporary hiatus for health reasons.

Aoi announced her departure from Sacra Music on December 31, 2023. She subsequently moved to Lantis in 2026, with her song "Monster" being used as the opening theme to the fourth season of Classroom of the Elite, and her song "Esoragoto" being used as the first opening theme to the fourth season of That Time I Got Reincarnated as a Slime.

== Musical style and influences ==
Aoi's musical style has been influenced by her love of anime, as well as artists such as Evanescence, Slipknot, and Tomiko Van of Do As Infinity. She initially did not show her mouth on physical release images, only revealing her full appearance during a Niconico livestream in June 2012. According to her, this was to give her a "mysterious aura" and because she wanted to emphasize her eyes, which she described as "powerful". Speaking to the website J-Pop Go before her London concert in 2015, she explained how she believed she would have never been discovered had it not been for the internet, and how she believes that it can be used as a tool for her to "connect the world" and "make dreams come true".

Aoi's songwriting style is that, when producing a song that would be used in an anime, she would first read the original source material or the anime script, and for songs that would be used in games, she would first play the game or discuss the story with a producer. After this, she would write song lyrics that would take into account the feelings of the characters.

Aoi related the development of her singles "Memoria" and "Innocence" in an interview with Animate Times. She detailed how she always wanted to perform "light-conscious songs" even before she made her major debut, and that the theme of her early songs would be about "letting the light shine through your heart, even when times are difficult". "Memoria" was released at a time when she did not perform live as she still hid part of her face, and taking this into account, she wanted to make a song where emotions could be expressed through her singing as opposed to her mouth. For "Innocence", she wanted to produce a song that could express the growth and experiences that Sword Art Online's main characters Kirito and Asuna were encountering.

For her first album Blau, Aoi wanted to express varying emotions such as "real sadness" or "fun expressions", as opposed to her previous releases, which described as mainly focusing on "singing with strength or sorrow". For example, with the song "Yume no Owari" (夢の終わり, End of Dream), she sang it with a thick voice to "allow her to sound like an adult".

For her single "Accentier", Aoi wanted to produce a song that had a theme of "seeking the light, no matter how dark it gets". The title of the single comes from the word "accent", as she wanted the song to be a song to "cheer people on" and give people "an 'accent' of happiness". Aoi had been a long time fan of the Digimon franchise and was very happy to be chosen to perform a song for it.

== Discography ==
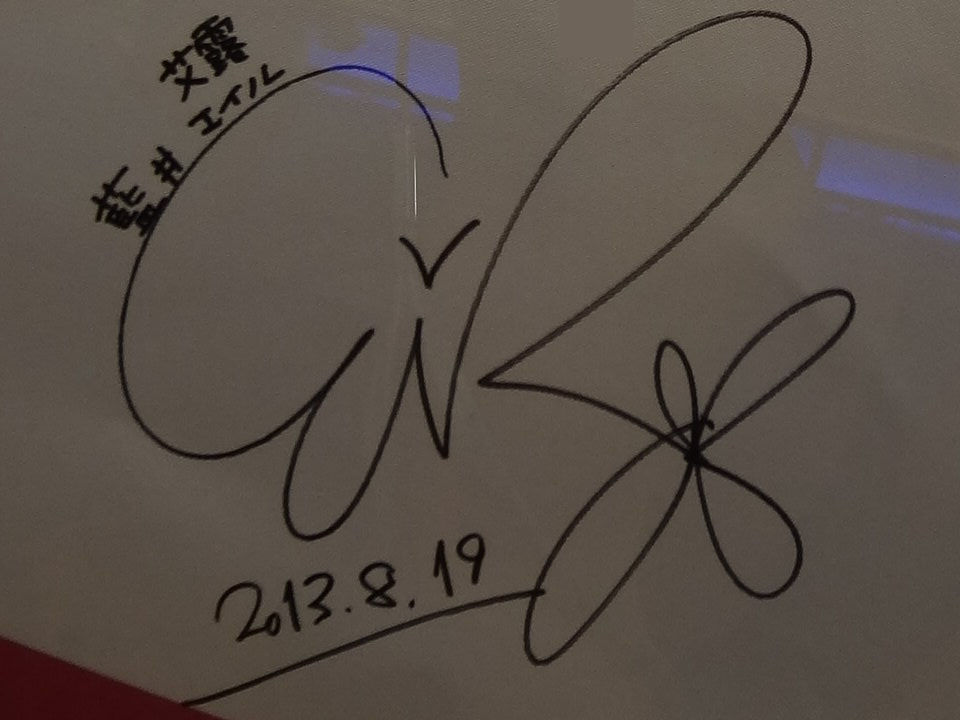
Eir's autograph, written at 14th (2013) Comic Exhibition

=== Studio and mini albums ===
Title	Album details	Peak position	Sales
Title	Album details	JPN	Sales
Prayer	Released: April 11, 2012; Label: SME Records; Formats: CD, digital download	12	—N/a
Blau	Released: January 30, 2013; Label: SME Records; Formats: CD, digital download	4	—N/a
Aube	Released: January 29, 2014; Label: SME Records; Formats: CD, digital download	6	—N/a
D'azur	Released: June 24, 2015; Label: SME Records; Formats: CD, digital download	4	JPN: 48,870
Fragment	Released: April 17, 2019; Label: Sacra Music; Formats: CD, digital download	5	JPN: 14,863
Kaleidoscope	Released: January 11, 2023; Label: Sacra Music; Formats: CD, digital download	9	JPN: 5,585
Unbound	Released: September 30, 2026; Label: Lantis; Formats: CD, digital download	34	JPN: 1,621

=== Greatest Hits albums ===
Title	Album details	Peak position	Sales
Title	Album details	JPN	Sales
Best -E-	Released: October 19, 2016; Label: SME Records; Formats: CD, digital download	3	JPN: 37,385+
Best -A-	Released: October 19, 2016; Label: SME Records; Formats: CD, digital download	4	JPN: 37,810+

=== Singles ===
Title	Year	Peak positions		Sales	Certifications	Album
Title	Year	JPN Oricon	JPN Billboard	Sales	Certifications	Album
"Memoria"	2011	8	19	JPN: 100,000+	RIAJ: Gold	Blau
"Aurora"	2012	22	71	—N/a		Blau
"Innocence"	2012	6	8	JPN: 100,000+	RIAJ: Gold	Blau
"Cobalt Sky"	2013	19	—	—N/a		Aube
"Sirius"	2013	21	32	JPN: 100,000+	RIAJ: Gold	Aube
"Niji no Oto" (虹の音 Sound of the Rainbow)	2014	12	18	—N/a		Aube
"Ignite"	2014	9	1	JPN: 250,000+	RIAJ: Platinum	D'Azur
"Tsunagaru Omoi" (ツナガルオモイ)	2014	20	51	—N/a		D'Azur
"Genesis"	2015	17	19	—N/a		D'Azur
"Lapis Lazuri" (ラピスラズリ)	2015	13	7	JPN: 250,000+	RIAJ: Platinum	D'Azur
"Shoegazer"	2015	26	36	—N/a		Best -A-
"Accentier"	2016	14	40	—N/a		Best -A-
"Tsubasa" ( 翼 Wings)	2016	9	5	JPN: 100,000	RIAJ: Gold	Best -E-
"Ryūsei / Yakusoku" (流星 / 約束 Meteor / Promise)	2018	8	10	—N/a		Fragment
"Iris" (アイリス)	2018	11	8	—N/a		Fragment
"Tsuki o Ou Mayonaka" (月を追う真夜中 Following the Moon in the Middle of the Night)	2019	24	79	JPN: 5,530		Non-album singles
"Hoshi ga Furu Yume" (星が降るユメ Dream Of a Falling Star)	2019	19	54	JPN: 6,925		Non-album singles
"I will..."	2020	6	64	JPN: 11,882		Non-album singles
"Kodo" (鼓動, Heartbeat)	2021	10	—	JPN: 4,840		Non-album singles
"Atok" (アトック)	2021	16	—	JPN: 4,059		Non-album singles
"PHOENIX PRAYER"	2022	10	—	JPN: 6,049		Non-album singles
"HELLO HELLO HELLO"	2022	16	—	JPN: 4,253		Non-album singles
"Shinzou" (心臓, Heart)	2022	16	84	JPN: 5,428 (Phy.); JPN: 5,256 (Dig.)		Non-album singles
MONSTER / unrealistic	2026	22	—	JPN: 2,292 (Phy.)		Non-album singles

==== Collaboration singles ====
Title	Year	Peak Oricon chart positions	Album
Sо̄kyū no Fanfare (蒼穹のファンファーレ, Fanfare of the Blue Sky) (with FictionJunction, ASCA, ReoNa): Released: October 28, 2022	2022	TBA	Non-album single

== Awards and nominations ==
Year	Award	Category	Nominee/work	Result
2014	Newtype Anime Awards	Best Theme Song	"Sirius" (from anime Kill la Kill)	Runner-up
2018	Newtype Anime Awards	Best Theme Song	"Ryūsei" (from anime Sword Art Online Alternative Gun Gale Online)	6th place
