= Reona =

Japanese singer (born 1998)

- Also known as: Reopeko; Elsa Kanzaki
- Born: October 20, 1998 (age 27); Amami Ōshima, Kagoshima Prefecture, Japan
- Genres: J-pop; anison
- Occupations: Singer; cosplayer
- Years active: 2018–present
- Label: Sacra Music (2017–present)
- Website: www.reona-reona.com

Reona (Japanese: レオナ [ɾe.o̞.na̠]; stylized as ReoNa, born October 20, 1998) is a Japanese singer who is signed to Sacra Music. Having been active as a cosplayer and independent musician, she made her major debut in 2018 as the singing voice of the character Elza Kanzaki in the anime series Sword Art Online Alternative: Gun Gale Online. Her first single under her own name was released in August 2018.

== Early life ==
Reona was born in Amami Ōshima on October 20, 1998. She became interested in becoming a cosplayer during her elementary school years, as she had been recommended to become one by a classmate. Her interest in cosplay was boosted after ordering a costume of the Vocaloid Hatsune Miku. She became active as a cosplayer while in junior high school, and went under the names Reopeko (れおぺこ) and ReoNa* while attending events such as Comiket 91 in 2016. She had also dreamed of becoming a singer for anime, and had released covers of songs on YouTube.

== Career ==
Reona had her break as a singer in 2017 when she became a finalist in an audition held by the music label Sacra Music. She made her major debut as a singer the following year as the singing voice of the character Elza Kanzaki in the anime series Sword Art Online Alternative: Gun Gale Online. She released the song "Pilgrim" (ピルグリム) on April 15, 2018; the song topped iTunes Japan's anime singles chart as well as Amazon Japan's digital music rankings. This was followed by the release of the digital singles "Step, Step" and "Independence". She released the mini-album Elza on July 4, 2018; the mini-album peaked at No. 8 on Oricon's weekly charts. Her first single under her own name, "Sweet Hurt", was released on August 29, 2018; the title track was used as the ending theme to the anime series Happy Sugar Life. Her second single "forget-me-not" was released digitally on January 13, 2019, and received a physical release on February 6, 2019; the title track was used as the second ending theme to the anime series Sword Art Online: Alicization, and the single also includes the song "Niji no Kanata ni" (虹の彼方に, Beyond the Rainbow), which was used as the ending theme for episode 19 of anime series Sword Art Online: Alicization.

Reona's feature single "Prologue" was released on June 26, 2019 under the Elza Kanzaki stage name. Her third single "Null" was released on August 28, 2019. She released her fourth single "Anima" digitally on July 13, 2020, and received a physical release on July 22, 2020; the title song was used as the opening theme of television series anime Sword Art Online: Alicization – War of Underworld: Part 2. (Note: This single was originally scheduled to be released on May 20, 2020, but was delayed due to the postponement of the anime. The anime is getting delayed due to COVID-19 pandemic.) Reona sang "Scar/let" as the opening for the video game Sword Art Online Alicization Lycoris, as well as appearing in the game as a playable character. On July 1, 2020 single "Untitled World" was released as part of promotion for "Episode 6: Partial Necrosis" update of the game Arknights. She released her first album, Unknown, on October 7, 2020.

Reona collaborated with Hiroyuki Sawano on the song "Time"; the song was used as the ending theme to the anime series The Seven Deadly Sins: Dragon's Judgement. She released her fifth single "Nai Nai" on May 12, 2021; the title song was used as the ending theme to the first season of the anime series Shadows House. Her sixth single "Shall We Dance?" was released on July 27, 2022; it was used as the opening theme of the second season of Shadows House. Reona's single "Alive" was used as the opening theme for the anime Arknights: Prelude To Dawn. Her song "VITA" was featured as the theme song in the video game Sword Art Online: Last Recollection. She held a one-off Nippon Budokan concert on March 6, 2023, and released her second studio album, Human, 2 days after, on March 8, 2023. Her single "R.I.P" was used as the ending theme song for the anime Arknights: Perish in Frost. On September 30, 2024, Reona released her 10-minute single "Our Song" (私たちの讃歌(ウタ), Watashitachi no Uta), the theme song for the Sword Art Online: Fractured Daydream video game, featuring all the artists who were involved in Reona's Sword Art Online works; the song contains elements from Ludwig van Beethoven's Symphony No. 9's fourth movement "Ode to Joy", as well as his Piano Sonata No. 8 "Pathetique", second movement.

== Influences ==
=== Artistic inspirations ===
Reona in a 2019 interview, talked about how her motivation comes from her dream at a young age to become a singer as she enjoyed singing and watching animated series. She continued by highlighting that she cares about her fans and all her admirers who welcome and love her music and thanks her fans for making her dream come true. In the same interview, Reona said she has multiple artists she admires making it difficult to choose only one as a role model. She highlights ever since she was the voice singer for Elza Kanzaki, a character from the anime Sword Art Online Alternative: Gun Gale Online, she began to play the guitar. Her Azalea guitar was inspired by Ed Sheeran's guitar since she had admired his guitar. Reona also talks about the anime series Higurashi When They Cry which she had seen a lot of during her youth and was considered an anime with a dark tone. She said the second season's opening song had the most impact on her music.

=== Lyric style and themes ===
Reona said her use of dark emotions and strong lyrics comes from her encounters and reflects her emotions in a 2019 interview. In scenarios with collaborations, she would do her best to find a balance between herself and the song. She would then go on to talk about her emotions with her lyricists and ask them to add those emotions to her lyrics. During a separate interview in 2022 with JRock News, Reona talked about her song "Numb" (written in entirely English). She describes the theme of the song to revolve around self-dissatisfaction escalating to self-disgust reflecting how she feels both mentally and emotionally.

=== Sword Art Online importance ===
Reona brought up in a 2021 interview that she was so thrilled to be the singing voice actor for the character Elza Kanzaki as it was the first time that she would sing in an anime and it was a moment that completely transformed her life. She describes about how heartfelt it was to hear her voice among the characters in a fight scene. In her 2019 interview, Reona credits her singing role for Elza Kanzaki as it allowed her to share her music with a wider audience. Reona continued in her 2021 interview and described how she began to place herself in the world of Sword Art Online, making the ending theme song "forget-me-not" for Sword Art Online: Alicization and making the opening theme song "Anima" for Sword Art Online: Alicization – War of Underworld. Reona continues about how for the 10th anniversary of the release of the SAO novel, she made the opening theme "Till the End" and when she watched the song in the music video, she was so close to having tears of joy. She highlighted she did not think she would be who she is today if she had never come across the Sword Art Online anime.

== Discography ==
=== As Elza Kanzaki ===
==== Singles ====
List of singles
Title	Year	Album
"Pilgrim"^{[note 1]}	2018	Elza
"Step, Step"^{[note 1]}	2018	Elza
"Disorder"^{[note 1]}	2018	Elza
"Independence"^{[note 1]}	2018	Elza
"Replica"^{[note 1]}	2018	Elza
"Hikari"^{[note 1]}	2018	Elza
"Rea(s)oN"^{[note 1]}	2018	Elza
"Alone"^{[note 1]}	2019	Prologue
"Dancer in the Discord"^{[note 1]}	2019	Prologue
"Sousouno Uta"^{[note 1]}	2019	Prologue
"Rea(s)oN" (Acoustic Live Version)^{[note 1]}	2019	Prologue
"Disorder" (Acoustic Live Version)^{[note 1]}	2019	Prologue
"Oh UnHappy Day"^{[note 1]}	2024	Elza2
"Girls Don't Cry"^{[note 1]}	2024	Elza2
"Toxic"^{[note 1]}	2024	Elza2
"Revolution"^{[note 1]}	2024	Elza2
"Hareruya"^{[note 1]}	2024	Elza2
"Game of Love"^{[note 1]}	2024	Elza2
"You"^{[note 1]}	2024	Elza2
"Alone -Naked-"^{[note 1]}	2024	Elza2

==== Mini-albums ====
List of albums, with selected chart positions
Title	Album details	Peak positions	
Title	Album details	JPN	JPN Hot 100
Elza	Released: July 4, 2018; Label: Sacra Music; Format: CD	8	3
Elza2	Released: November 23, 2024; Label: Sony Music Labels; Format: CD	11	—

=== As Reona ===
==== Albums ====
List of albums, with selected chart positions
Title	Album details	Peak chart positions	
Title	Album details	JPN Oricon	JPN Hot 100
Unknown	Released: October 7, 2020; Label: Sacra Music; Format: CD, CD+BD, CD+BD+Photo booklet	4	3
Human	Released: March 8, 2023; Label: Sacra Music; Format: CD, digital download, streaming	7	6
Heart	Released: October 8, 2025; Label: Sacra Music; Format: CD, digital download, streaming	10	—

==== Mini-albums ====
List of mini-albums, with selected chart positions
Title	Album details	Peak positions	
Title	Album details	JPN	JPN Hot 100
月姫 -A piece of blue glass moon- THEME SONG E.P.	Released: September 1, 2021; Label: Sacra Music; Format: CD, digital download, streaming	5	21
Naked	Released: May 11, 2022; Label: Sacra Music; Format: CD, digital download, streaming	6	—

==== Singles ====
===== As lead artist =====
List of singles, with selected chart positions
Title	Year	Peak chart positions		Notes	Album
Title	Year	JPN Oricon	JPN Hot 100	Notes	Album
"Sweet Hurt"	2018	26	82	Ending for anime Happy Sugar Life.	Unknown (Note: For the single "Null", only "Kaibutsu no Uta" was added to the album.)
"Forget-Me-Not"	2019	15	35	2nd Ending for anime Sword Art Online: Alicization.	Unknown
"Null" (Note: It includes: "Kaibutsu no Uta" (怪物の詩; lit. 'Monster Poem'); "Lotus"; "Ketsui no Asani" (決意の朝に; lit. 'On the Morning of Determination') (Aqua Timez cover))	2019	19	—		Unknown
"Anima"	2020	4	16	2nd Opening for anime Sword Art Online: Alicization – War of Underworld.	Unknown
"Nai Nai" (ないない; lit. 'No No')	2021	9	46	Ending for anime Shadows House.	Human
"Shall We Dance?" (シャル・ウィ・ダンス?)	2022	11	—	2nd Opening for anime Shadows House.	Human
"Alive"	2022	5	—	Opening for anime Arknights: Prelude To Dawn.	Human
"R.I.P."	2023	7	—	Ending for anime Arknights: Perish in Frost.	Non-album singles
"Gajumaru: Heaven in the Rain" (ガジュマル ～Heaven in the Rain～)	2024	11	—	Ending for anime Shangri-La Frontier.	Non-album singles
"GG"	2024	5	—	Ending for anime Sword Art Online Alternative: Gun Gale Online II.	Non-album singles
"End of Days"	2025	10	—	Opening for anime Arknights: Rise from Ember.	Non-album singles
"Amore"	2026	10	—	Opening for anime I Want to Love You Till Your Dying Day.	Non-album singles
"—" denotes items which did not chart.

==== Digital singles ====
List of singles
Title	Year	Album
"Ougon no Kagayaki"	2020	Non-album single
"Till the End"	2020	Unknown
"Untitled World"	2020	Unknown
"Scar/let" (English version)	2020	Non-album singles
"Anima (Josh Pan Remix) – Sacra Beats Singles"	2022	Non-album singles

===== As featured artist =====
List of singles, with selected chart positions
Title	Year	Peak chart positions		Notes	Album
Title	Year	JPN Oricon	JPN Hot 100	Notes	Album
"Time" (SawanoHiroyuki[nZk]:ReoNa)	2021	—	—	Ending for anime The Seven Deadly Sins: Dragon's Judgement.	IV
"Sо̄kyū no Fanfare (蒼穹のファンファーレ, Fanfare of the Blue Sky)" (with FictionJunction, ASCA, Eir Aoi)	2022	—	—	Theme song for the 10th anniversary of the anime Sword Art Online.	Non-album single
"Light Our Way" (with HoYoFair)	2025	—	—	Featured on the HoYoFair program to coincide with Genshin Impact's fifth anniversary.	Non-album single
"—" denotes items which did not chart.

== Awards and nominations ==
Award ceremony	Year	Category	Nominee(s)/work(s)	Result	Ref.
6th Crunchyroll Anime Awards	2022	Best Ending Sequence	"Nai Nai" (from Shadows House anime)	Nominated	
7th Crunchyroll Anime Awards	2023	Best Anime Song	"Shall We Dance?" (from the second season of Shadows House anime)	Nominated	

== Notes ==
- The singles were released as digital downloads.
