= Blau (album) =

Studio album by Eir Aoi
- Released: January 30, 2013
- Genre: J-pop
- Length: 65:46
- Label: SME Records

Eir Aoi chronology
Prayer (2012)	Blau (2013)	Aube (2014)

Singles from Phase 2
- 1. "Memoria" Released: October 19, 2011; 2. "Aurora" Released: September 5, 2012; 3. "Innocence" Released: November 21, 2012

Blau (stylized as BLAU) is the debut studio album by Japanese singer Eir Aoi. It was released under SME Records on January 30, 2013. It debuted at number four on Oricon chart, and reached number three on Billboard Japan Top Albums Sales. Blau takes its title from German word meaning "blue", denoting her image color and thought that "I want you to feel a variety of Eir Aoi". Three singles were released from the album: "Memoria", "Aurora", and "Innocence", all of them were used for anime theme songs. "Memoria" was chosen as Fate/Zero 's first ending theme, "Aurora" as Mobile Suit Gundam AGE 's fourth opening theme, and "Innocence" as Sword Art Online 's second opening theme. "Memoria" and "Innocence" were most successful songs of the album, have been certified Gold by the RIAJ for sales in Japan, with over 100,000 copies sold for each.

== Track listing ==
CD
No.	Title	Lyrics	Music	Length
1.	"Overture"		Ryosuke Shigenaga	0:50
2.	"Aurora"	Eir Aoi; Shigenaga	Shigenaga	4:20
3.	"Innocence"	Aoi; Shigenaga	Shigenaga	4:37
4.	"Satellite" (サテライト)	Katsuhiko Kurosu	Kurosu	4:25
5.	"Senkou Zenya" (閃光前夜 The Night Before the Flash)	Hiroki Arai	Arai	5:11
6.	"High & High"	Aoi; Takahiro Yasuda	Takahiro Yasuda	4:09
7.	"Avalon Blue" (アヴァロン・ブルー)	Aoi; Sohshi Iihama	Tomo.	4:48
8.	"Frozen Eyez"	Fumio Yasuda	Fumio Yasuda	5:11
9.	"Yume no Owari" (夢の終わり End of Dream)	Yusuke Shirato	Shirato	5:15
10.	"Lament"	Aoi; Iihama	Tomo.	5:17
11.	"Faceless" (フェイスレス)	Fumio Yasuda	Fumio Yasuda	4:26
12.	"Reunion"	Fumio Yasuda	Fumio Yasuda	3:38
13.	"Sora wo Aruku" (空を歩く Walk in the Sky)	Aoi; Takahiro Yasuda	Takahiro Yasuda	5:06
14.	"Memoria"	Aoi; Fumio Yasuda	Fumio Yasuda	4:48
15.	"Gloria" (Limited Edition Bonus Track)	Yui	Yui	3:27
Total length:				65:46

== Charts ==
=== Album ===
Chart (2013)	Peak position
Japanese Albums (Billboard)	3
Japanese Albums (Oricon)	4

=== Singles ===
Title	Year	Peak positions	
Title	Year	JPN Oricon	JPN Billboard
"Memoria"	2011	8	19
"Aurora"	2012	22	71
"Innocence"	2012	6	8
