= Yakusoku (Eir Aoi song) =

- The regular edition cover

Single by Eir Aoi

from the album Fragment
- A-side: "Ryūsei" (double A-side)
- Released: June 13, 2018
- Recorded: 2018
- Studio: Sony Music Studio (Tokyo, Japan)
- Genre: J-pop
- Length: 4:47
- Label: Sacra Music
- Composer: Ryosuke Shigenaga
- Lyricists: Eir Aoi, Ryosuke Shigenaga

Eir Aoi singles chronology
"Tsubasa" (2016)	"Yakusoku" / "Ryūsei" (2018)	"Iris" (2018)

Music video
- 約束(Youtube edit) on YouTube

"Yakusoku" (約束, Promise) is a song by Japanese pop singer Eir Aoi. It was released on her official YouTube on February 8, 2018 as her comeback song from her hiatus, before received a physical release together with the song "Ryūsei" on June 13, 2018 as her fourteenth single. It reached number 8 on Oricon and number 10 on Japan Hot 100. The single mark as her first double A-side single.

== Release and reception ==
On 8 February 2018, it was announced that she would resume her activities after her hiatus with the release of the music video "Yakusoku" (約束, Promise) on YouTube. The song itself was released together with the song "Ryūsei" on June 13, 2018 as her fourteenth single on three edition; Regular edition, Limited edition and Limited anime edition. The single reached number 8 on Oricon, and 10 on Japan Hot 100. The song was featured in her fourth album "Fragment".

== Music video ==
The music video for "Yakusoku" was directed by Yūsuke Tanaka. The video features a lyrics of the song with some footage of Eir Aoi with using blue jacket taking a photo session in the mountain, with some scene featuring a forest and also a mountain

== Track listing ==
=== Regular edition ===
CD
No.	Title	Length
1.	"Ryūsei" (流星 Meteor)	4:13
2.	"Yakusoku" (約束 Promise)	4:47
3.	"Hitokakera no Yuuki" (ヒトカケラの勇気 A Piece of Courage)	3:52
4.	"Ryūsei" (流星 Meteor) (Instrumental)	4:11

=== Limited edition ===
CD
No.	Title	Length
1.	"Ryūsei" (流星 Meteor)	4:13
2.	"Yakusoku" (約束 Promise)	4:47
3.	"Hitokakera no Yuuki" (ヒトカケラの勇気 A Piece of Courage)	3:52
4.	"Ryūsei" (流星 Meteor) (Instrumental)	4:11

DVD
No.	Title	Length
1.	"Ryūsei" (music video)	4:11
2.	"Yakusoku" (music video)	4:45

=== Limited anime edition ===
CD
No.	Title	Length
1.	"Ryūsei" (流星 Meteor)	4:13
2.	"Yakusoku" (約束 Promise)	4:47
3.	"Hitokakera no Yuuki" (ヒトカケラの勇気 A Piece of Courage)	3:52
4.	"Ryūsei" (流星 Meteor) (Sword Art Online Alternative Gun Gale Online OP ver)	1:29

DVD
No.	Title	Length
1.	"Ryūsei" (Sword Art Online Alternative Gun Gale Online opening version without credit)	1:30

== Personnel ==
Singer and bands

- Eir Aoi – vocals, lyrics ("Ryūsei", "Yakusoku")
- Kohei Tsunami, Ryosuke Shigenaga, Katsuhiko Kurosu – lyrics
- Ryosuke Shigenaga – Piano, arranger, other instruments
- Hiroki Arai - bass
- Takumi Sone – guitar
- Taro Yoshida – drums
- Tomoe Nakajima, Izumi Taniguchi, Nao Yamada - Violin, viola
- Kana Matsuo - Cello

Production

- Satoshi Morishige, Nobuyuki Fujiwara – record
- Kenichi Koga – mixer

== Charts ==
Year	Chart	Peak position (shared with Ryūsei)
2017	Oricon	10
2017	Japan Hot 100	8

== Release history ==
Region	Date	Label	Format	Catalog
Japan	13 June 2018	Sacra Music	CD	VVCL-1255
Japan	13 June 2018	Sacra Music	CD+DVD	VVCL-1252
Japan	13 June 2018	Sacra Music	CD+DVD	VVCL-1256
