= Shadows House =

Japanese manga series

- First tankōbon volume cover, featuring Emilico (left) and Kate Mirror (right)

シャドーハウス (Shadō Hausu)
- Genre: Dark fantasy; Mystery; Supernatural
- Manga
- Written by: Somato
- Published by: Shueisha
- English publisher: NA: Yen Press
- Imprint: Young Jump Comics
- Magazine: Weekly Young Jump
- Original run: September 6, 2018 – present
- Volumes: 22
- Anime television series
- Directed by: Kazuki Ōhashi
- Produced by: Souta Furuhashi; Shiryuu Kitazawa; Keisuke Satou; Chihiro Kawamura (S1); Hiroshi Kirinaga (S1); Yuuko Matsui (S2); Aina Nemoto (S2)
- Written by: Toshiya Ōno
- Music by: Kenichiro Suehiro
- Studio: CloverWorks
- Licensed by: Crunchyroll (Note: In North America through Crunchyroll, LLC.); SEA: Muse Communication
- Original network: Tokyo MX, BS11, Gunma TV, GYT, MBS, BS Asahi, Wowow, FTV
- English network: SEA: Animax Asia; US: Crunchyroll Channel
- Original run: April 11, 2021 – September 24, 2022
- Episodes: 25
- icon

Shadows House (Japanese: シャドーハウス, Hepburn: Shadō Hausu) is a Japanese manga series written and illustrated by the duo Somato. It has been serialized in Shueisha's seinen manga magazine Weekly Young Jump since September 2018, with its chapters collected in 22 tankōbon volumes as of July 2026.

A 13-episode anime television series adaptation produced by CloverWorks aired from April to July 2021. A second 12-episode season aired from July to September 2022.

== Plot ==
In a mansion live the denizens of the Shadow House, attended by their Living Doll partners who endlessly clean the soot their masters emit. Emilico, a young and cheerful Living Doll, is delighted to start serving her mistress Kate. As the two grow closer and are slowly exposed to various events within the House, they start to discover a number of dark secrets.

== Media ==
=== Manga ===
Written and illustrated by the duo Somato (specifically, written and designed by Nori and illustrated by Hisshi), Shadows House started in Shueisha's seinen manga magazine Weekly Young Jump on September 6, 2018; the Weekly Young Jump app, YanJan!, distributes a full-color version of the series. In July 2024, the manga entered its final story arc, and Somato announced a new serialization schedule: two chapters followed by a two-issue break, replacing the previous three-chapter-one-break cycle. They also noted that the story writer's health, poor since 2023, had not improved. Somato estimated at least one more year of serialization at this pace.

Shueisha has compiled its chapters into individual tankōbon volumes. The first volume was released on January 18, 2019. As of July 17, 2026, 22 volumes have been released.

The manga has been licensed for English release in North America by Yen Press, with the first volume released on June 21, 2022. As of January 21, 2025, eight volumes have been released.

A ten-page special crossover chapter with Somato's previous manga series, Kuro, titled "Shadows House × Kuro" (シャドーハウス × 黒, Shadō Hausu Kuro), was published in Young Jump Heroine on August 10, 2022.

=== Anime ===
In October 2020, an anime television series adaptation was announced on the cover of the manga's sixth volume. The series is produced by CloverWorks and directed by Kazuki Ōhashi, with scripts written by Toshiya Ōno, character designs by Chizuko Kusakabe, and music composed by Kenichiro Suehiro. It aired for 13 episodes from April 11 to July 4, 2021, on Tokyo MX and other channels. (Note: Tokyo MX listed the air dates for the series on Saturday at 24:30, which is effectively Sunday at 0:30 a.m. JST.) The opening theme is the instrumental "A Hollow Shadow", composed by Suehiro, while the ending theme is "Nai Nai" (ないない), performed by Reona. The ending song for the eighth episode is the instrumental "My Perfect World" (私の完璧な世界, Watashi no Kanpeki na Sekai), composed by Suehiro. Aniplex collected the episodes on six DVD and Blu-ray sets, released from June 23 to November 24, 2021.

In September 2021, it was announced that a second season was in production. The main cast and staff reprised their roles. It aired for 12 episodes from July 9 to September 24, 2022. (Note: Tokyo MX listed the air dates for the series on Friday at 24:00, which is effectively Saturday at midnight JST.) For the second season, the opening theme is "Shall We Dance?" (シャル・ウィ・ダンス?, Sharu Wī Dansu?), performed by Reona, while the ending theme is "Masquerade", performed by ClariS. Aniplex collected the episodes on six DVD and Blu-ray sets, released from September 28, 2022, to February 22, 2023.

==== English release ====
Funimation streamed the series outside of Asia. Following the announcement that Funimation would be unified under the Crunchyroll brand, the series became available on the namesake platform. Crunchyroll also streamed the second season. Both seasons were released on home video; the first one on September 20, 2022, and the second on August 29, 2023.

In Southeast Asia, the series is licensed by Muse Communication. Both seasons were broadcast on Animax Asia in the region.

== Reception ==
=== Manga ===
By October 2023, the manga had over 2.7 million copies in circulation. By July 2024, it had over 3 million copies in circulation. By July 2026, it had over 3.5 million copies in circulation.

Rebecca Silverman of Anime News Network gave the first volume a B+ rating. Silverman highlighted the relationship between Kate and Emilico, and praised the series for its Victorian-inspired setting and detailed artwork, commenting that it "calls to mind such well-known texts as Snow White and Through the Looking-Glass", also stating that Emilico resembles John Tenniel's illustrations of Alice from Alice's Adventures in Wonderland. Reviewing the second and third volumes, Silverman commented that while the first volume served as an introductory book, the second and third volumes are much more plot-packed, also praising the new introduced characters, and expressing that the worldbuilding "continues to be excellent." Antonio Mireles of The Fandom Post gave the first volume a B− grade. Mireles commented that, although the first volume does not make a strong first impression, he felt the series has potential to develop further. He praised the relationship between Kate and Emilico—"explored by great artistic expression due to the nature of the Shadows". Reviewing the first volume, Danica Davidson of Otaku USA lauded the series for its setting and artwork, commenting that it "does a good job of showing us a world gone by." Davidson also praised the "own unique blend" between the "wholesome feeling" of the older clothing, living styles, and characters, and the series' own "sinister and creepy" premise, ultimately calling the first volume "an interesting start."

=== Anime ===
Allen Moody of THEM Anime Reviews gave the series five out of five stars. Moody praised the series for its premise, setting and characters (highlighting the character of Kate), also positively comparing it to The Promised Neverland for the "atmosphere of claustrophobia and menace". Moody finally commented: "The first two seasons of Shadows House may have been mostly stage-setting, but I'm eager to see the rest of this saga unfold."

The first season's ending theme song, "Nai Nai" by Reona, was nominated for Best Ending Sequence at 6th Crunchyroll Anime Awards in 2022. The second season's opening theme, "Shall We Dance?" by Reona, was nominated for Best Anime Song at the 7th edition in 2023.
