= UMG Recordings, Inc. v. Shelter Capital Partners LLC =

United States Court of Appeals for the Ninth Circuit case

- Court: United States Court of Appeals for the Ninth Circuit
- Decided: December 20, 2011
- Citations: No. 09-55902, 2013 WL 1092793 (2013 Revised Ninth Circuit Opinion), 667 F.3d 1022 (9th Cir. 2011) (Original Ninth Circuit Opinion), CV 07-5744 AHM (AJWx) (District Court Opinion)

Case history
- Appealed from: United States District Court for the Central District of California

Court membership
- Judges sitting: Harry Pregerson, Raymond C. Fisher, and Marsha Berzon

UMG Recordings, Inc. v. Shelter Capital Partners LLC, 667 F.3d 1022 No. 09-55902, was a United States Court of Appeals for the Ninth Circuit case in which UMG sued video-sharing website Veoh, alleging that Veoh committed copyright infringement by hosting user-uploaded videos copyrighted by UMG. The Ninth Circuit upheld the decision of the United States District Court for the Central District of California that Veoh is protected under the Digital Millennium Copyright Act's safe harbor provisions. It was established that service providers are "entitled to broad protection against copyright infringement liability so long as they diligently remove infringing material upon notice of infringement".

== Background and case history ==
Veoh was a video-sharing web site where users could view, upload and share videos, much like YouTube.

On September 4, 2007, UMG, without filing any prior DMCA takedown notices, sued Veoh for vicarious and contributory copyright infringement. On September 11, 2009, Judge Howard Matz granted summary judgement in favor of Veoh, ruling that Veoh "qualifies for a DMCA safe harbor that protects the service from monetary damages for copyright infringements committed by its users". Despite successfully defending itself, Veoh declared bankruptcy shortly after the District Court ruling, with Veoh's CEO Dmitry Shapiro citing the cost of litigation as a cause.

On appeal, the Ninth Circuit reaffirmed the lower court's decision on December 20, 2011, though it remanded to the district court the question of whether Veoh was entitled to the recovery attorney's fee under Federal Rules of Civil Procedure Rule 68.

UMG failed in both district and appellate court to add three of Veoh's investors, Shelter Capital Partners, LLC, Shelter Venture Fund LP, and Spark Capital LLC, as defendants. Both courts noted that UMG did not sufficiently allege that the investors could be held liable for any indirect infringement.

In an unusual move, in 2013 the Ninth Circuit issued an update to their 2011 opinion in order to align their views with the findings by the Second Circuit in Viacom International Inc. v. YouTube, Inc. . The revisions sought to clarify the difference between actual and "red flag" knowledge, though it still failed to specifically state the conditions needed for information to qualify as red flag knowledge.

On April 4, 2013, the Ninth Circuit denied UMG's petition for a rehearing.

== DMCA safe harbor analysis ==
UMG claimed that Veoh did not qualify for liability protection under the DMCA Safe Harbor Provision for Online Storage (17 USC § 512(c)) because Veoh stepped outside the bounds of "storage" as defined by the provision, failed to act despite having knowledge of the infringing materials, and derived a direct financial benefit from infringing activities by their users.

=== Storage vs. access ===
The Safe Harbor provision states that "A service provider shall not be liable ... for infringement of copyright by reason of the storage at the direction of a user of material that resides on a system or network controlled or operated by or for the service provider". UMG argued that the phrase "by reason of storage" meant that the "infringement must be proximately caused by storage", and so Veoh disqualified itself by providing access on top of storage to these infringing videos. However, both the district and circuit court found that this interpretation was too literal, and that, the DMCA would not have included language requiring the service providers to "disable access" to infringing material had it meant that access was not protected. In particular, the Ninth Circuit reasoned that storage without access would be of little use to a web host:

UMG's theory fails to account for the reality that web hosts, like Veoh, also store user-submitted materials in order to make those materials accessible to other Internet users. The reason one has a website is so that others may view it.

=== Actual and apparent knowledge ===
UMG further alleged that, despite failing to send DMCA takedown notices, Veoh had "actual" knowledge of infringement as defined by DMCA under § 512(c)(1)(A)(i) because it was generally known that the site could be used to distribute infringing videos, and that "Veoh must have known that some of the content on its site was unauthorized." The Circuit held that, barring specific information regarding infringement such as from a DMCA takedown notification,

"merely hosting a category of copyrightable content, such as music videos, with the general knowledge that one's services could be used to share infringing material, is insufficient to meet the actual knowledge requirement under § 512(c)(1)(A)(i)",

and that "safe harbor would be rendered a dead letter" otherwise.

The circuit also denied UMG's claims that hints of infringement, such as tagging of videos with keywords which may imply infringement ("music video", "Avril Lavigne", "50 Cent", and "Britney Spears" for example) or news articles discussing illegal copies on Veoh, constitute apparent "red flag" knowledge of infringement under § 512(c)(1)(A)(ii) because such circumstances fail the test for red flag knowledge established in Perfect 10 v. CCBill.

The circuit went further by reinforcing their ruling from Perfect 10, Inc. v. CCBill LLC and A&M Records, Inc. v. Napster, Inc. that the burden of identifying infringing material must fall on the Copyright holder and not the service provider.

=== Financial benefits ===
UMG also failed to show that Veoh received a "financial benefit directly attributable to the infringing activity, in a case in which the service provider has the right and ability to control such activity" under §512(c)(1)(B). In particular, UMG tried to argue that the standard for "the right ability to control" should follow the same standards as vicarious infringement, which only required loose supervision of users (A&M Records, Inc. v. Napster, Inc.).

However, The Circuit held that "right and ability to control" infringing activity must logically encompass more than "the mere ability to delete and block access to infringing material" because §512(c) presumes such ability by service providers in requiring for them to removal of such material, and therefore must include another factor. Although it was left ambiguous what this additional factor may look like in the original 2011 Ninth Court opinion, the 2013 update added a citation agreeing with the Second Circuit's ruling in Viacom v. YouTube that "substantial influence on the activities of users", such as detailed control over content or active involvement in listings on sites such as eBay can constitute "the right and ability to control" infringing materials.

== Veoh's attempt to recover litigation costs ==
The Ninth Circuit refused to grant Veoh attorney's fees under 17 USC § 505 because it found that the suit was not frivolous or in bad faith, citing Fogerty v. Fantasy. However, it also denied Veoh's request for fee recovery under Federal Rules of Civil Procedure Rule 68, which states that if a party refuses a settlement offer, and final decision is less favorable for the party than the offer, that such a party would be responsible for paying the counterparty's fees subject to the underlying statute (17 USC § 505 in this case). The Circuit reasoned that Rule 68 did not apply even though Veoh did offer a settlement since it had already decided to not award fees under 17 USC § 505, and that Rule 68 does not apply to prevailing defendants. This has been a source of confusion and controversy, since prevailing defendants would not need Rule 68 which awards less than 17 USC § 505, and losing defendants would never be eligible for Rule 68 because 17 USC § 505 only applies to prevailing defendants.

== Significance and impact ==
The implications of this case are particularly significant because the Ninth Circuit's ruling in UMG is in harmony with the Second Circuit's ruling in Viacom. Although, in Viacom, the Second Circuit had found that the internet service providers are entitled to protection under the DMCA’s safe harbor provision, this issue had not been addressed by the Ninth Circuit that now found the scope of the safe harbors to be broad.

From the perspective of a content provider in the ninth circuit, this decision has positive implications. Ninth Circuit is home to some of the largest copyright owners and Internet service providers, who would benefit from the clarity that comes with having a more consistent definition of actual and red flag knowledge and the right and ability to control for purpose of the DMCA § 512(c) safe harbor.

Thus, the Ninth Circuit's ruling in UMG seems to suggest that, in future, the courts would side with the service providers.

== See also ==
- Viacom International Inc. v. YouTube, Inc.
- Perfect 10, Inc. v. CCBill LLC
- A&M Records, Inc. v. Napster, Inc.
- Fogerty v. Fantasy
- Wolk v. Kodak Imaging Network Inc.
