= Wolk v. Kodak Imaging Network, Inc. =

- Court: United States District Court for the Southern District of New York
- Full case name: Wolk v. Kodak Imaging Network, Inc.
- Decided: 2012-01-03
- Docket nos.: 1:10-cv-04135
- Defendants: Kodak Imaging Network, Inc., Eastman Kodak Company, and Photobucket.com, Inc.
- Citation: 840 F. Supp. 2d 724

Case history
- Prior action: Preliminary injunction denied 2011-03-17
- Subsequent action: Appeal filed Second Circuit US Court of Appeals 2012-01-30

Holding
- Photobucket qualifies for safe-harbor protections under 17 U.S.C. § 512(c) and Kodak is not directly liable for the printing of images from Photobucket site

Court membership
- Judge sitting: Robert W. Sweet

Keywords
- DMCA safe harbor, takedown notice, 17 U.S.C. § 512(c), 17 U.S.C. § 512(c)(3) notices, photofinishing

Wolk v. Kodak Imaging Network, Inc., 840 F. Supp. 2d 724 (S.D.N.Y. Jan. 3, 2012), was a United States district court case in which the visual artist Sheila Wolk brought suit against Kodak Imaging Network, Inc., Eastman Kodak Company, and Photobucket.com, Inc. for copyright infringement. Users uploaded Wolk's work to Photobucket, a user-generated content provider, which had a revenue sharing agreement with Kodak that permitted users to use Kodak Gallery to commercially print (photofinish) images from Photobucket's site—including unauthorized copies of Wolk's artwork.

The court held that Kodak was not liable for direct copyright infringement because its photofinishing system relied on an automated process, and liability requires volitional conduct beyond "mere ownership of a machine used by others to make illegal copies." The court also held that Photobucket was protected under the safe-harbor provisions of the Digital Millennium Copyright Act (DMCA). This case is one of the few to analyze the forms of injunctive relief available to plaintiffs suing online service providers protected from copyright liability by DMCA safe-harbor provisions.

== Facts ==
Prior to filing suit, Wolk sent fifteen takedown notices to Photobucket relating to nine of Wolk's works which Photobucket users had uploaded. Eleven of these notices did not comply with § 512(c)(3) of the DMCA (17 U.S.C. § 512(c)(3)) because they neglected to include the URLs for the infringing posts.

Photobucket promptly removed the infringing content in response to all of Wolk's DMCA-compliant notices and some of her non-compliant notices. However, Wolk also wanted Photobucket to proactively remove future posts containing the material she identified without the need for her to send additional notices.

Photobucket's agreement with Kodak relied on an automated system which transferred images from the Photobucket website to the Kodak Gallery, where "prints and other items incorporating the photographs" would be available for purchase from Kodak. Wolk described ten incidents in which Kodak "allegedly made, sold and shipped products using Wolk's copyrighted images without obtaining Wolk's permission or a valid license."

== Court opinion ==
=== Preliminary injunction ===
Wolk moved for a preliminary injunction to prevent Photobucket from infringing her copyrights. To obtain a preliminary injunction, a plaintiff must prove either "a likelihood of success on the merits" or "irreparable harm, that the balance of hardships falls in her favor, or that public policy supports her sought-after relief."

The court held that Wolk's claims were unlikely to succeed on the merits because Photobucket qualified for safe-harbor protections under the DMCA. Specifically, Photobucket qualified for the safe-harbor protections of 17 U.S.C. § 512(c) because (1) Photobucket fell within the statutory definition of "service provider," (2) it implemented a policy to deal with repeat infringers, (3) it did not interfere with "standard technical measures," and (4) under the circumstances of this case, it met the requirements for protection. Wolk argued that her notices to Photobucket identifying specific instances of infringement also served as notices of present and future infringement, effectively requiring Photobucket to police its site for user activity that infringes Wolk's copyrights. The court held that the DMCA imposes no such obligation on service providers.

Because Photobucket qualified for DMCA safe-harbor protections, the injunctive relief available to Wolk was limited to the three types enumerated in 17 U.S.C. § 512(j): an order restraining the provider from providing access to the infringing material or activity, an order restraining access to an account engaging in infringing activity, or other relief that the court deems necessary to prevent specific instances of infringement. The court held that this section provided no relief to Wolk because Photobucket had already complied with all of her takedown notices.

The court also found that Wolk failed to demonstrate irreparable harm, that the balance of hardships weighed in her favor, or that the injunction would serve the public interest.

Because she failed to prove the elements necessary to obtain a preliminary injunction, the court denied Wolk's motion.

=== Summary judgment ===
On May 2, 2011, Wolk moved for summary judgment against Photobucket and Kodak. In response, both Photobucket and Kodak filed cross-motions for summary judgment against Wolk. The court denied Wolk's motions and granted the motions of Photobucket and Kodak.

Courts will grant summary judgment if the evidence shows "that there is no genuine dispute as to any material fact and that the movant is entitled to judgment as a matter of law." Courts ask "whether the evidence presents a sufficient disagreement to require submission to a jury or whether it is so one-sided that one party must prevail as a matter of law."

==== Kodak ====
In her motion for summary judgment against Kodak, Wolk argued that Kodak directly infringed her copyrights by copying her images and printing them on products for its customers. She argued that she was entitled to statutory damages of up to $150,000 for each instance of infringement because Kodak "wilfully infringed" her copyrights.

To prevail on a claim of direct infringement, a plaintiff must prove that the defendant engaged in "volitional conduct" that caused the infringement. Here, the court held that "there is no evidence of volitional conduct, thereby preventing Wolk from establishing direct liability." Kodak fulfilled orders from Photobucket through an automatic computer system without any human intervention. Since the process was entirely automated, Kodak lacked the volition necessary to hold it liable for direct infringement.

Since Kodak could not be held liable for direct infringement, the court did not reach the questions of whether Kodak qualified for DMCA safe harbors, whether its infringement was "willful", or whether Wolk was entitled to statutory damages for each work of art infringed.

==== Photobucket ====
In her motion for summary judgment against Photobucket, Wolk argued that Photobucket was liable for direct, contributory, and vicarious copyright infringement.

First, the court held that Photobucket was entitled to safe-harbor protections under the DMCA. It found that Photobucket satisfied the three threshold requirements for safe-harbor protections: (1) it was a "service provider" within the statutory definition, (2) it adopted and reasonably implemented a policy to block repeat infringers, and (3) it accommodated and did not interfere with "standard technical measures." The court also found that Photobucket met the requirements for protection under 17 U.S.C. § 512(c), which creates a safe harbor for service providers that host "[i]nformation residing on systems or networks at [the] direction of users." The court addressed five points in its analysis of Photobucket's safe harbor under 17 U.S.C. § 512(c):

1. Actual knowledge of the infringing activity: Wolk argued that her takedown notices imposed a duty on Photobucket to remove all present and future instances of infringement of the works she listed. The court disagreed, holding that Photobucket was only required to remove the instances of infringing material that Wolk specifically identified in DMCA-compliant notices.
2. "Right and ability to control" and "financial benefit": Photobucket did not have the "right and ability to control" user-generated content because it did not prescreen user submissions before publishing them. In addition, Photobucket did not receive a financial benefit specifically from the infringing activity; rather, it profited by providing its services in general.
3. Removal of infringing material: Photobucket promptly removed infringing material when it received takedown notices.
4. Designated agent: Photobucket properly designated an agent to receive takedown notices as the DMCA requires.
5. Duty to police: Photobucket did not have a duty to monitor its service for evidence of infringing activity.

The court concluded that "Photobucket is able to take advantage of the 'safe harbor' provision under 17 U.S.C. § 512(c)." Thus Photobucket was not liable for direct copyright infringement.

Wolk also argued that Photobucket was secondarily liable for contributory and vicarious copyright infringement. The court held that the safe harbor under 17 U.S.C. § 512(c) protected Photobucket from these claims. Even without the safe harbor protections, however, the court noted that Wolk's claims for secondary liability would fail.

== Commentary ==
Eric Goldman wrote that "this is the most detailed judicial discussion of 512(j) to date", offering a substantial interpretation of the DMCA's injunctive provisions. He also wrote that this case establishes "useful boundary-setting for service providers" in future scenarios when those providers might find themselves faced with "copyright owners who want turnkey never-infringe-my-stuff-again services."

Martin Schwimmer of "The Trademark Blog" pointed out that Photobucket may not have pre-screening methods in place to police infringement, but larger companies like eBay do have this technology. He also commented that "it will continue to be cheaper and more effective to place intermediaries on actual notice than to bring 'constructive' notice/they shoulda known' litigations."

Thomas Yohannan of the California Western School of Law wrote that this case is "a reminder that the responsibility of finding infringing works is up to the copyright holder, not the website. A website that complies with the DMCA safe harbors is responsible for removing UGC (user-generated content) only if the copyright holder notifies them of the specific illegal content at that moment (a 512(c)(3) takedown notice). It's not responsible for future occurrences."

Joe Mullin of GigaOm wrote that "the fact that Photobucket was found to easily fit into the 'safe harbor' provided by the DMCA suggests that the path for internet companies to stay safe from copyright allegations is getting clearer in the wake of recent major decisions, such as the YouTube case."

=== Photofinishing liability ===
Photofinishing is the business or process of printing photographs from film negatives or digital images. This case, which released Kodak from liability associated with photofinishing, marks a possible departure from earlier cases holding photofinishers liable for creating unauthorized prints of copyrighted works. For instance, In 1999, the Professional Photographers of America sued Kmart, seeking $600,000 in damages and an injunction to prevent Kmart from violating copyright law by printing copyright protected images for their customers. Retailers have sought to avoid liability by refusing to print high-quality images without written releases from photographers.

In this case, the court established that the transmission of images from Photobucket to the Kodak Gallery did "not constitute a volitional act" because it was the result of an automated process. Eric Goldman commented that "Kodak's system was completely automated only because Kodak's engineers designed it that way,", and that "a richer theoretical grounding for the volitional doctrine and how it interplays with strict liability" could add clarity to this result. Goldman added that "this ruling has to be encouraging for other automated photofinishers (whether they print photos or other items), such as CafePress or Zazzle."

== See also ==
- IO Group, Inc. v. Veoh Networks, Inc.
- Viacom International Inc. v. YouTube, Inc.
- UMG Recordings, Inc. v. Shelter Capital Partners LLC
- Perfect 10, Inc. v. Google Inc.
- Perfect 10, Inc. v. CCBill LLC
