= Dance In The Game =

2022 song by ZAQ

"Dance in the Game"

Song by ZAQ
- Released: July 13, 2022
- Recorded: 2022
- Genre: Anisong, J-pop, Jazz-rock
- Length: 3:45
- Label: Lantis
- Songwriter: ZAQ
- Producer: ZAQ

ZAQ singles chronology
"Akubi" (2021)	"Dance in the Game" (2022)	"Sora no ne" (2023)

"Dance in the Game" is a song by Japanese singer and songwriter ZAQ. Released on July 13, 2022, the track served as the opening theme for the second season of the anime series Classroom of the Elite. Written, composed, and arranged by ZAQ herself, the single was published under the Lantis label.

== Production and Composition ==
"Dance in the Game" was written, composed, and arranged entirely by ZAQ.

== Lyrical Themes and Strategy ==
The lyrics of "Dance in the Game" serve as a metaphorical strategy guide for the anime's protagonist, Kiyotaka Ayanokoji. The "Game" in the title refers to the high-stakes social manipulation present in the Tokyo Koudo Ikusei Senior High School.

== Usage in Media ==
The song was used as the opening theme for the second season of Classroom of the Elite (Yōkoso Jitsuryoku Shijō Shugi no Kyōshitsu e).

== Music Video ==
The official music video was directed by Tohru Fujimura and produced by HAOKK Inc.

== Release History ==
The single was released physically and digitally on July 13, 2022, by the Lantis label. The physical release (Catalog No. LACM-24278) included a special "B-side" collaboration with voice actress Maaya Uchida.

=== Track listing ===
No.	Title	Lyrics	Music	Arrangement	Length
1.	"Dance in the Game"	ZAQ	ZAQ	ZAQ	3:45
2.	"Live wo Wasureta Otaku ni Sasageru Oratorio" (feat. Maaya Uchida)	ZAQ	ZAQ	ZAQ	3:39
3.	"Dance in the Game" (Off Vocal)	—	ZAQ	ZAQ	3:45
4.	"Live wo Wasureta Otaku ni Sasageru Oratorio" (Off Vocal)	—	ZAQ	ZAQ	3:39

== Personnel ==
Credits adapted from the liner notes.

- ZAQ – Vocals, Piano, Lyrics, Composition, Arrangement
- Maaya Uchida – Guest Vocals (Track 2)
- Tohru Fujimura – Music Video Director
- Takafumi Hoshino – Recording Engineer
- Yasuhiro Shirai – Mixing Engineer
