= Capitol Records, LLC v Vimeo, LLC =

2013 US District Court case

Capitol Records, LLC v. Vimeo, LLC
- Court: United States District Court for the Southern District of New York
- Full case name: Capitol Records, LLC, EMI Blackwood Music, INC., et al. v. Vimeo, LLC
- Decided: December 31, 2013
- Docket nos.: 1:09-cv-10101
- Citations: 972 F. Supp. 2d 500; 972 F. Supp. 2d 537

Case history
- Subsequent actions: Affirmed, 826 F.3d 78 (2d Cir. 2016); cert. denied, 137 S. Ct. 1374 (2017).

Court membership
- Judge sitting: Ronnie Abrams

Keywords
- cyberlaw·copyright law·DMCA·safe harbor

Capitol Records, LLC v. Vimeo, LLC, 972 F. Supp. 2d 500, 972 F. Supp. 2d 537 (S.D.N.Y. 2013), was a 2013 copyright infringement case out of the United States District Court for the Southern District of New York. The decision resolved cross-motions for summary judgment filed by a video-sharing service (Vimeo) and a pair of record labels (Capitol Records and EMI, divisions of Universal Music Group). Vimeo sought a ruling that, as a matter of law, it was entitled to safe harbor protection under the Digital Millennium Copyright Act (DMCA) as to a series of copyrighted videos that were uploaded to its platform; the record labels sought the opposite ruling.

== Facts ==
Vimeo began operating in 2004-2005 as an online video platform that requires its users to upload only material they have created or participated in the creation of. Vimeo does not pre-screen the uploaded material, and relies on community reviews to guarantee that users follow its Terms of service, which include a "Community Guideline" that sets restrictions on uploaded content. Vimeo also provides a web page for its copyright infringement policy regarding the DMCA. The policy is enforced by the "Community Team," which uses "Moderator Tools" to filter and remove videos that contain offensive or infringing content.

In December 2009, record companies Capitol Records and EMI filed a lawsuit claiming that 199 videos on Vimeo's platform infringed their music copyrights.

Vimeo did not dispute that it lacked authorization from the copyright owners and that the videos infringed the plaintiffs' copyrights. Nevertheless, Vimeo argued that it was entitled to “safe harbor” protection under 17 U.S.C. § 512(c) (information residing on systems or networks at direction of users) of the DMCA.

== Opinion ==
=== September 2013 Order ===
In evaluating a safe harbor defense under the DMCA, a court will first evaluate whether the party has met a set of three threshold criteria. The court will then decide whether the party has fulfilled the requirements of the safe harbor protection it invokes.

==== Threshold criteria ====
The threshold criteria require that an online service provider has adopted, reasonably implemented, and informed users of a policy to terminate accounts of users who repeatedly infringe their copyright policy. Based on this, the District Court discussed the following:

1. Whether or not Vimeo qualified as a service provider: "Service provider" is a broad term covering various online entities. The court noted that sites that provide more than basic file storage for users have consistently been found to be service providers. Thus, it reasoned, Vimeo can be considered an online service provider.
2. Whether or not Vimeo had adopted a repeated infringement policy: Vimeo's repeated infringement policy was clearly stated in its terms of use, and supported by emails that show employees did terminate accounts based on infringement. The court held this was enough to show adoption.
3. Whether or not Vimeo had informed users of the policy: This criterion requires the service provider to notify users that they face termination of their use of the service if they repeatedly violate copyright laws. The court determined that Vimeo required registered users to agree not to infringe one another's copyrights, informed users that their accounts could be terminated if the agreement was violated, and provided contact information for Vimeo's DMCA agent.
4. Whether or not Vimeo reasonably implemented the policy: The plaintiffs claimed that Vimeo's implementation was inadequate because it banned email addresses, not IP addresses, and that its treatment of notices received within a three-day period as single instances of infringement was too lenient. However, the court determined that the implementation need not be perfect, only reasonable, and that Vimeo met this requirement.
5. Whether or not Vimeo's policies interfered with "standard technical measures" of identifying and protecting copyrighted works: The court determined that although Vimeo's privacy policy did make it more difficult for copyright holders to collect information regarding their works, it did not specifically interfere with technical measures.

Based on this, the court determined that Vimeo met the threshold requirement for safe harbor protection under the DMCA.

==== Safe Harbor Requirements ====
As to whether Vimeo qualified for a safe harbor pursuant to §512(c), the District Court discussed several factors:

1. Storage at the direction of a user: 10 of the 199 videos had been uploaded by users who were or became Vimeo's employees. The court found that there was a triable issue as to whether they stored the content as "users" or as employees acting on behalf of Vimeo.
2. Knowledge of infringement: 2.a) Some employees had interacted with 55 of 199 infringing videos (by liking, commenting, or reviewing). There was a triable issue as to whether Vimeo acquired "actual or red flag knowledge" of the infringing videos due to these actions by their employees; 2.b) A series of emails by Vimeo employees commenting on or ignoring infringing content was insufficient to establish "willful blindness" on the part of Vimeo.
3. Ability to control infringing content with financial benefits: the court decided that Vimeo's control tactics were not pervasive enough to induce or influence its users to upload copyrighted material.
4. Expeditious removal: The court found that Vimeo had removed the infringing videos expeditiously at plaintiffs' request.

==== Pre-1972 Recordings ====
The court shared the plaintiffs' view that the DMCA safe harbors did not apply to recordings fixed before February 15, 1972, but declined to extend the DMCA protections, stating this was a policy matter that should be resolved by the Congress. Therefore, the court held that any infringing video-in-suit recorded prior to 1972 was not eligible for safe harbor protection.

=== December 2013 Order ===
On December 31, the court decided that:

1) Vimeo was entitled to summary judgment as to seventeen more videos related to the case. Fifteen of them were uploaded by "Plus" users, who accounted for 36% of the 43,000 new videos uploaded daily to the website. The court reasoned that the sheer number of these users made it unrealistic to believe that employees watched every one of their uploaded videos. As to two other videos that played copyrighted songs for a short time in the background, the court concluded that the infringement was not “obvious to a reasonable person”, leaving room for a fair use defense. 2) The court also allowed Plaintiffs to add other instances of infringement to the suit, many related to songs recorded before February 15, 1972, or to videos that Vimeos interacted with.

3) Finally, the court certified questions raised by the defendant, which means that : "(a) Whether the DMCA's safe-harbor provisions are applicable to sound recordings fixed prior to February 15, 1972; and (b) Whether, under Viacom International Inc. v. YouTube, Inc., a service provider's viewing of a user-generated video containing all or virtually all of a recognizable, copyrighted song may establish 'facts or circumstances' giving rise to 'red flag' knowledge of infringement."

== Significance and reactions ==
The case has generated different reactions from reviewers.

Justin E. Pierce and Matthew R. Farley have argued that cases like this help shed light on the fine-tuning of online service providers' rights, obligations and potential eligibility for safe harbor protection. In their analysis of the September 2013 Order, they pointed out some implications to providers of streaming video: "Don’t hedge on a copyright enforcement policy, and put it front and center. (...); Actions speak louder than words. (...); Streaming media companies should manage how their employees interact with users. (...); Although it may be difficult, streaming media startups should resist uploading initial content in order to populate and popularize their services. (...); As a general matter, tolerating “gray areas” will cost money. (...); 'Red flag' knowledge and willful blindness are significant expansions on actual knowledge."

Evan Sheres has stated: "Judge Abrams failed to establish a reasonable precedent regarding 'red flag' knowledge, further eroding the 'red flag' standard. Actual employee interaction with the infringing material, especially where the employees make it harder for copyright owners to issue takedown notices, should be sufficient to constitute infringement which is ‘objectively’ obvious to a reasonable person."

Others are particularly interested in the implications of applying the safe harbor protection to recordings made before February 1972.
