= Classroom of the Elite season 1 =

2017 anime television series

Classroom of the Elite
- Season 1
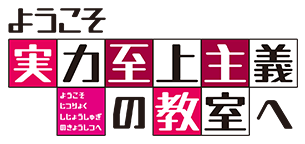
- Logo of the first season
- No. of episodes: 12

Release
- Original network: AT-X
- Original release: July 12 – September 27, 2017

Season chronology
- Next → Season 2

Classroom of the Elite is an anime television series based on the light novel of the same name, written by Shōgo Kinugasa and illustrated by Shunsaku Tomose. The first season of the anime series is produced by Lerche, directed by Seiji Kishi and Hiroyuki Hashimoto, with Aoi Akashiro handled the series composition, Kazuaki Morita designed the characters, and Ryo Takahashi composed the music. The opening theme song is "Caste Room", performed by ZAQ, while the ending theme song is "Beautiful Soldier", performed by Minami Kuribayashi. Crunchyroll streamed the series with subtitles, and Funimation streamed the English dub. The season aired from July 12 to September 27, 2017, on AT-X and other networks.

== Episodes ==
No. overall	No. in season	Title (Note: All English titles are taken from Crunchyroll.) (Note: The episode titles are taken from literature by various European philosophers.)	Directed by	Written by	Storyboarded by	Original release date	Ref.
1	1	"What is Evil? Whatever Springs from Weakness." (Note: "Was ist schlecht? - Alles, was aus der Schwäche stammt." — Friedrich Nietzsche, Der Antichrist); Transliteration: "Aku to wa Nani ka? Yowasa kara Shōzuru Subete no Mono da." (Japanese: 悪とは何か――弱さから生ずるすべてのものだ。)	Yū Kinome	Aoi Akashiro	Yusuke Kamata	July 12, 2017	
Kiyotaka Ayanokōji joins the school in Class 1-D at the Advanced Nurturing High School, an institution established by the government for training best students. Class-D's homeroom teacher, Sae Chabashira explains the point system as money, where everybody gets a monthly allowance of 100,000 points at local shops with one point equaling one yen. She warns the students that they are judged on merit. Ayanokōji navigates the system being careful about how he spends the points, while meeting the gregarious Kikyo Kushida and accompanying his selfish classmate Suzune Horikita. In an attempt to help Kushida become friends with Suzune, Ayanokōji brings them to a cafeteria, having secretly invited them and two other classmates. However, Suzune sees through the plan and leaves them. On April 30, the majority of Class-D lavishly spends their points and slacks off in class without reprimands, making Ayanokōji suspicious. On May 1, the Class-D students learn they never get any allowance, and Chabashira explains that it depends on merit. After ignoring their studies, the class lacks points for a month.
2	2	"It Takes a Great Talent and Skill to Conceal One's Talent and Skill." (Note: "C'est une grande habileté que de savoir cacher son habileté." — François de La Rochefoucauld, Maximes); Transliteration: "Sainō o Kakusu no ni mo Takuetsu Shita Sainō ga iru." (Japanese: 才能を隠すのにも卓越した才能がいる。)	Yoshinari Suzuki	Hayato Kazano	Noriaki Saito	July 19, 2017	
Chabashira explains how the system works at school. The four first-year classes are all ranked by merit, and Class-D has the opportunity to be promoted to Class-C with strong performances on exams. She warns that with the current situation, anybody who fails the exam will be expelled. Being aware of the system, everyone takes their studies often, except Ken Sudo, Kenji Ike, and Haruki Yamauchi. Ayanokōji and Suzune discuss these matters, and she asks him to invite the boys to the study group in the library. Kiyotaka and Kushida fail to invite them, due to Suzune's selfishness. Although Sudo lets everybody know he wants to play basketball, he has no interest in his studies. Ayanokōji discovers Suzune talking to her brother and student council president, Manabu. He threatens her with an agreement about a misplaced view about independent isolation. Ayanokōji intervenes, and Manabu reveals that he scored fifty points on every test and asks if it was a coincidence. The midterm exams come, and Class-D as a whole performs very well with some points among the first years at school.
3	3	"Man is an Animal that makes Bargains: No Other Animal Does This, No Dog exchanges Bones with Another." (Note: Quoted from Adam Smith, The Wealth of Nations); Transliteration: "Ningen wa Torihiki o Suru Yuiitsu no Dōbutsu de Aru. Hone o Kōkan Suru Inu wa inai." (Japanese: 人間は取引をする唯一の動物である。骨を交換する犬はいない)	Yusuke Kamata	Ohine Ezaki	Yusuke Kamata	July 26, 2017	
Class D gets the results of their last exam and everyone passes except for Sudo, who missed the passing threshold by one point. The grades were the result of Ayanokōji spending 15,000 points to buy exam questions from an upperclassman three days earlier. He explains that none of this is against school rules. Later, Ayanokōji discovers Chabashira asking her whether equality exists, and she answers that it does not and Ayanokōji agrees. Ayanokōji and Suzune spend the points to increase the test score by one point, so Sudo can stay in class. Kushida inadvertently leaves her cellphone, but Ayanokōji returns it to her. When he sees her having a selfish personality, she asks him to keep it a secret, or she will accuse him of raping her.
4	4	"We Should not be Upset that Others Hide the Truth from Us When We Hide it from Ourselves." (Note: "Il ne faut pas s'offenser que les autres nous cachent la vérité, puisque nous nous la cachons si souvent à nous-mêmes" — François de La Rochefoucauld, Maximes); Transliteration: "Tanin ga Shinjitsu o Inpei suru Koto ni Taishite, Wareware wa Okoru Beki Denai. Nazenara, Wareware mo Jishin kara Shinjitsu o Inpei suru no de aru kara" (Japanese: 他人が真実を隠蔽することに対して、我々は怒るべきでない。なぜなら、我々も自身から真実を隠蔽するのであるから。)	Yōhei Fukui	Aoi Akashiro	Daisei Fukuoka	August 2, 2017	
On July 1, Class-D's point distribution is put on hold, due to an incident the previous day involving Sudo and three basketball teammates from Class-C. Sudo was attacked and fought back in self-defense. However, due to poor reputation, he will be liable, unless the class can find a witness to clear his name before the hearing next week, which would consequently result in the class without points for the month. In an attempt to manipulate the case in their favor, the three Class-C attackers secretly request classmate Kakeru Ryūen to attack them. With the help of Class-B, the Class-D students post messages asking for witnesses of the incident. Suzune tells Ayanokōji and the others that Airi Sakura was there, and witnessed the incident with the camera. That night, Ayanokōji and Kushida discuss the truth, if one of the suspects is a killer, while the other is a law-abiding citizen, if there is a lack of evidence, people are more likely going to believe the law-abiding citizen even if they are guilty. The next day, Sakura is approached for the evidence and she inadvertently drops the camera. She freaks out when she cannot use it, thinking that she broke it and forbids anyone from getting involved.
5	5	"Hell is other People." (Note: "l'enfer, c'est les autres" — Jean-Paul Sartre, Huis-clos); Transliteration: "Jigoku, Sore wa Tanin de Aru" (Japanese: 地獄、それは他人である。)	Yoshifumi Sasahara	Hayato Kazano	Yoshifumi Sasahara	August 9, 2017	
Sakura, Ayanokōji, and Kushida inspect the camera covered under warranty at the electronics store. The store clerk asks Sakura about her contact information, but Ayanokōji uses his information instead. He figures out that Sakura is the internet model that became a big hit recently. At the hearing presided by Manabu, both classes give their testimonies accusing each other of instigating the fight with the initial ruling going in Class-C's favor. After staying silent, Suzune speaks up after Ayanokōji reminds her. Suzune asks what the circumstances were for the fight and points out that in a three against one fight. It is impossible for injuries that serious to be all what Sudo did. She presents Sakura as a witness providing evidence that she was present as she captured the fight going on in the background during a photoshoot. However, the evidence only proves that she was present and does not clear Sudo of any wrongdoing. The Class-C homeroom teacher Sakagami proposes a compromise to suspend Sudo for two weeks and the three Class-C students for one week, but Class-D rejects it. Realizing that one side is clearly lying, Manabu ends the hearing, saying he will announce his decision the next day unless admissions or additional evidence is presented. He mentions that he can expel any students.
6	6	"There are Two Kinds of Lies; One concerns an Accomplished Fact, the Other concerns a Future Duty." (Note: "Il y a deux sortes de mensonges: celui de fait qui regarde le passé, celui de droit qui regarde l'avenir." — Jean-Jacques Rousseau, Émile, ou De l'éducation); Transliteration: "Uso ni wa Nishurui Aru. Kako ni Kan Suru Jijitsujō no Uso to Mirai ni Kansuru Kenrijō no Uso de Aru." (Japanese: 嘘には二種類ある。過去に関する事実上の嘘と未来に関する権利上の嘘である。)	Fumio Itō	Ohine Ezaki	Yū Kinome	August 16, 2017	
Sakura returns to the dormitory and finds the photos in a mailbox. Taking advantage of the delay in the final ruling that was made possible with the photo, Ayanokōji and Suzune set up a trap at the stairwell. Kushida sends a fake message to three Class-C students, ordering them to meet her at the special annex in order to draw them to the stairwell, where Ayanokōji and Suzune are waiting, and Honami Ichinose installed security cameras. This helps them trick the Class-C students into believing neither side stands to gain by going forward with this complaint, and that the trio stands to get expelled because they told a malicious lie that got the school involved. As a result, the Class-C students agree to withdraw the complaint. Afterwards, the electronics store clerk and a big fan of the net alter ego Shizuku attacks Sakura, but Ayanokōji and Ichinose use the tracker on each phones and security cameras to arrest the clerk. Chabashira mentions to Suzune that Class-D is a place for defectives in the school, and that Ayanokōji is one of them in her opinion. Ayanokōji refuses to join the student council and defers the credit for settling the case to Suzune. They plan to help the others reach Class-A.
7	7	"Nothing is as Dangerous as an Ignorant Friend; A Wise Enemy is to be Preferred." (Note: "Rien n'est si dangereux qu'un ignorant ami; Mieux vaudrait un sage ennemi." — Jean de La Fontaine, Fables); Transliteration: "Muchi na Yūjin hodo Kiken na Mono wa Nai. Kashikoi Teki no Hō ga Yoppodo Mashida." (Japanese: 無知な友人ほど危険なものはない。賢い敵のほうがよっぽどましだ。)	Yoshinari Suzuki	Aoi Akashiro	Yoshihito Nishōji	August 23, 2017	
A group of Class-D students, consisting of Ayanokōji, Sudo, Ike, Yamauchi, and operation leader Hideo Sotomura, meet up to discuss preparations for peeping on the girls inside the changeroom. Ayanokōji invites Suzune to the pool and warns her about the operation. With everyone invited and enjoying the pool, Yamauchi sneaks into the women's changeroom as a janitor to secretly install the cameras under the pretense of closing it for cleaning. However, Manabu, and the students of Class-C and Class-A enter near the room, leading to a tense standoff and trapping Ike there. Needing help to escape, Sotomura informs Ayanokōji about the situation, and Suzune stands on the top of a diving platform to have a speech about Class-D ascending to Class-A someday, allowing Ike to escape. Suzune removes all SD cards from the cameras to foil the operation. Ayanokōji tells her that he used her, and that he had let the operation happen, due to the possibility they would have done it behind his back.
8	8	"Abandon All Hope, Ye Who Enter Here." (Note: "Lasciate ogni speranza, voi ch'entrate" — Dante Alighieri, Divina Commedia); Transliteration: "Nanjira Koko ni Hair Mono, Issai no Nozomi o Suite yo." (Japanese: 汝等ここに入るもの、一切の望みを捨てよ。)	Yusuke Kamata	Ohine Ezaki	Akiyo Ohashi	August 30, 2017	
For a class trip, all first-year students are taken on a luxurious cruise ship. Ayanokōji finds out from Chabashira that an unknown man had contacted the school, asking for him to be expelled. Chabashira offers to cover for him in order for him to reach Class A. Suspecting that she may be manipulating him, he refuses, but she warns him that if he does, he will be expelled and stripped of his freedom. Ayanokōji discusses with Suzune about the trip's destination. He tells her that he suspects the school is taking them to a boarding house on an island owned by the school for an ulterior motive. Ryūen tries to manipulate Suzune about the security camera. Another student from Class-C, Mio Ibuki, tries to confront Ryūen about something, but they are rebuffed by Albert Yamada. Suzune remarks that Class-C could be on the verge of collapsing from the inside. Sakayanagi plots in the background and investigates with other students. Later, Sakura asks Ayanokōji to go out on a date, but suddenly changes her mind when he goes to meet her. When Kushida sees them, Sakura is embarrassed and leaves. Ayanokōji tries to leave, but is stopped by Kushida, when she reverts to a bad personality. She tells him that she could sense his wariness of her, which he confirms. Kushida switches back to a good personality and confesses that she feels lonely when left alone. The next day, the school informs all the students of the real reason behind the trip. They are required to take a survival test on a deserted island for a week.
9	9	"Man is Condemned to be Free." (Note: "L'homme est condamné à être libre." — Jean-Paul Sartre, L'existentialisme est un humanisme); Transliteration: "Ningen wa Jiyū no Kei ni Shosa rete Iru." (Japanese: 人間は自由の刑に処されている。)	Yoshihide Yūzumi	Hayato Kazano	Yoshihide Yūzumi	September 6, 2017	
Yosuke Hirata explains from the manual how the survival test works. The class gets 300 test points to buy food and other conveniences, and whatever remains at the end of the week can be exchanged for class points. The class loses test points for injuries, polluting the environment, missing roll calls, and violence against any classes. While Class-D determines to tough it out, the girls plan to use a portable toilet, the argument aside, and Class-D determines to save up points. The group finds a camping spot, and Ayanokōji accompanies Sakura and Rokusuke Koenji. Ayanokōji leaves Koenji, while he and Sakura look for a spot to secure, recalling what Chabashira said about possessing a spot, in that only the designated class leader can do it and each possession that lasts for eight hours gets the team one special test point that is only redeemable for class points. By keeping fifty test points, the class gets to guess whom the leader from another class is. While looking for a spot, Ayanokōji sees Kohei Katsuragi holding the leader card while talking with classmate Yahiko Totsuka. Class-D reconvenes and sets up camp at a spot by the river. Suzune is chosen to be the leader for being responsible and not standing out. While gathering firewood, Ayanokōji, Yamauchi, and Sakura, find the injured Mio, and Kushida offers food for her. The class plans a strategy for spending their points as they set a limit of 180 points to buy two meals a day, a toilet, a tent, and thirty for unforeseen situations. However, the class suffers a setback when Koenji withdraws, despite not feeling ill as he claims he is, costing thirty points from Class-D.
10	10	"Every Man has in Himself the Most Dangerous Traitor of All." (Note: "Den farligste Forræder blandt alle er den, ethvert Menneske har i sig selv." — Søren Kierkegaard, Kjerlighedens Gjerninger); Transliteration: "Uragirimono no Naka de Mottomo Kiken'naru Uragirimono wa Nanika to Ieba, Subete no Ningen ga Onore Jishin no Naibu ni Kaku Shite Iru Tokoro no Mono de Aru." (Japanese: 裏切者の中で最も危険なる裏切者は何かといえば、すべての人間が己れ自身の内部にかくしているところのものである。)	Yōhei Fukui	Ohine Ezaki	Yōhei Fukui	September 13, 2017	
Ayanokōji and Suzune go to reconnoiter the situation at other camps. Class-B's camp is set up near a waterfall and operates much like Class-D's camp but at a better location. Class-A's camp is in a cave that is heavily guarded. Suzune ignores it, when Katsuragi summons his security force and warns her that she might start a war. Class-C's camp is on a beach where, under Ryūen, all points have already been spent and the class treats this test like a vacation. Ryūen did this knowing that they will not be penalized if they had spent all of their test points beforehand. He berates Mio for defying him. That night, someone has secretly broke into the girl's tent and stole the phone from Class D camp. On the fourth day, Class-D does more reconnaissance to find out who are the class leaders. Ayanokōji and Sakura meet Ichinose at Class-C's camp, and learn that everybody except Mio had withdrawn from the test. On the fifth day, Kei Karuizawa loses her underwear. Class-D conducts a bag search, but Yamauchi finds it in Ike's bag. Ayanokōji takes it, but the girls demand a pat-down. When the pat-down search is conducted, Hirata finds Ayanokōji, but reports that he could not find it. Later, he talks with him and decides to take the underwear knowing that his reputation would be damaged the least for being the culprit, because of Karuizawa.
11	11	"What People Commonly Call Fate is Mostly their Own Stupidity." (Note: "Was aber die Leute gemeiniglich das Schicksal nennen sind meistens nur ihre eigenen dummen Streiche." — Arthur Schopenhauer, Parerga und Paralipomena); Transliteration: "Shikashi Gaishite Hitobito ga Unmei to Yobu Mono wa, Taihan ga Jibun no Gukō ni Suginai." (Japanese: しかし概して人々が運命と呼ぶものは、大半が自分の愚行にすぎない。)	Takahiro Majima	Hayato Kazano	Akiyo Ohashi	September 20, 2017	
In response to the item theft incident, trust within Class-D erodes, and the girls of Class-D are separated from the boys on each camps. Mio asks Ayanokōji about the opinion for the thief, and he trusts her while telling her that Sudo suspects her. That night, Ayanokōji and Suzune sit by a campfire, and he notices that she has been sick during the entire test. Suzune had been resting in her room during the cruise in order to recover from her illness and is determined to tough it out. The next day, Class-D gathers food in advance of a rainstorm. While fishing in the river, Ayanokōji asks Suzune to check the leader card, confirming whether it is real and that Katsuragi was holding. However, he is still unsure after seeing it. Yamauchi puts mud on Suzune, before she throws him to the ground near Ayanokōji. While Suzune cleans her hair, someone has secretly stole the leader card, so Ayanokōji can know about it. Shortly afterwards, someone has burnt the survival test manual, leading to even more trust issues for Class-D. Suspecting that it was Mio's doing while she is from another class, Suzune fails to retrieve her key card from Mio unbeknownst to anyone. Mio brings the card to a mysterious student.
12	12	"Genius Lives Only One Story Above Madness." (Note: "Das Genie wohnt nur eine Etage höher als der Wahnsinn" — Arthur Schopenhauer, Parerga und Paralipomena); Transliteration: "Tensai to wa, Kyōki Yori mo 1-Kaisō-bun Dake ue ni Sunde Iru Mono no Koto de Aru." (Japanese: 天才とは、狂気よりも1階層分だけ上に住んでいる者のことである。)	Yoshinari Suzuki, Yoshihide Yūzumi, and Atsuko Tonomizu	Aoi Akashiro	Yoshihide Yūzumi & Daisei Fukuoka	September 27, 2017	
Mio notifies Katsuragi through a ham radio that she has secured Suzune's card, as Class-A and Class-C are revealed to be working together. Suzune gets withdrawn from the test. On the final day, the students pack their camps and the classes guess the leaders, with Class-B opting not to make answers. At the assembly, Ryūen reveals that he secretly forged a pact with Katsuragi to transfer 200 test points to Class-A, in exchange for the card or the photo. Class-C quickly spent the remaining 100 points, and everyone except Ryūen, Mio, and Kaneda, the last of whom was assigned to spy on Class-B, withdrawn from the test. Class-C would guess the leaders: Yahiko Totsuka for Class-A, Chihiro Shiranami for Class-B, and Suzune for Class-D. The results are revealed: the winner is Class-D with 225 points, followed by Class-B with 140 points, Class-A with 120 points, and Class-C with no points. The students return to the cruise ship, where Arisu Sakayanagi reveals that things went according to plan in making everybody mistrust Katsuragi to weaken his leverage over the class as her ally Hashimoto secretly outed Class-A's leader to Ryūen. Ayanokōji tells Suzune that he allowed Mio to steal the card, and he became the leader replacing Suzune, ensuring that Class-A and Class-C incorrectly guessed her. As for guessing the other ones, he reveals that he only saw the backside of Katsuragi's card and knowing how cautious he was, he deduced that Totsuka was Class-A's leader. He was aware that Ryūen had not withdrawn, leading him to guess him as Class-C's leader as he saw him with the same radio Mio used. Refusing to jeopardize Class-D's alliance with Class-B, Ayanokōji opted not to name Class-B's leader. Ryuen reveals that the main motivation for the alliance with Class-A was he would sign a contract to receive 20,000 points from each student of Class-A, every month until graduation. In a meeting with Chabashira, Ayanokōji finds out from her that the man who wanted him expelled was his father. Ayanokōji tells Chabashira that despite his father's warning, he will defy him. Having told Suzune that she needs allies, Ayanokōji tells Hirata that she was responsible for Class-D's victory, in order to have others put their trust in her. However, Ayanokōji wants nothing to do with anyone in his class as he only sees them, and humans in general, as tools, and will continue to use and sacrifice others as long as he "wins" in the end.
