= Homemovie.com =

HomeMovie.Com is a video sharing and photo sharing website. It is usually used by individuals for easy online video recording, video editing, online video storage and online video sharing. Unlike other video sharing companies, HomeMovie.Com specializes in helping users with editing and sharing long-form video (videotapes) instead of short video clips. HomeMovie.Com is one of only two companies with a web-based video recording feature.

== Features ==
- HomeMovie.Com's StashSpace service is free, and also has a subscription-based premium service that allows for unlimited storage and sharing of a user's video at higher quality levels.
- A user has multiple options to add video to the user's account. One can either record video directly from a digital camcorder; upload digital video files in .wmv, .avi, .mov, .mp4, .divX, .3gp, .3g2 format; add mobile video to the account; make a video slideshow of one's photos; or send in videotapes to be professionally transferred to digital for $7 per videotape. Accepted formats include VHS, VHS-C, Hi8, Digital8, DV, miniDV, and Beta Max
- Photos can be imported into a user's account. Simple editing tools exist to rotate, sharpen, blur and increase contrast of the original photo.
- Videos are presented in an Interactive DVD-Style format. One can create scenes by selecting start and end points for different sections within a video. Each section, or "scene", includes a customizable thumbnail image, and the ability to create a scene name and appropriate "tags" for future searching and organization.
- Private Video Sharing is conducted privately through individual email invitations to friends and family. Visitors do not need to create an account to watch a user's video
- Public Sharing is accomplished through a "StashFeed"—A public video feed that can be added to a MySpace or other social networking account or blog. As a user publishes movies with the feed, this widget is automatically updated, and can hold up to 10 individual movies at any time.
- Keyword tagging searching exists for easy management and mashing of photos and videos
- Video can be converted for Video iPod playback with Premium Accounts.
- Video SnapShots can be co-mingled with digital pictures to create PhotoAlbums set to music.

== History ==
John Larsen founded HomeMovie.Com in 2000, and his partner Lars Krumme joined him in early 2002. Prior to 2004, the company was also known as Home Movie Corporation, or HomeMovie.Com. It is currently offering its web-based Tools through StashSpace.com.

HomeMovie.Com was the first company to offer consumer video to DVD transfer services for under $100, starting in 2000. At that time, DVDs were still a new commodity, with blank DVD media costing $45/DVD and Pioneer A01 DVD Authoring Drives in the $4,000 to $5,000 range. Competitors at that time included Life Clips, based in Massachusetts, and Yes Video, based in California.

The company's first online video editing platform was publicly launched in March 2001. They added full-length video streaming of consumer videos in 2003 through the launch of StreamingDVD. The current version of their web-based media management software was initially launched in fall of 2004 and has gone through three major updates since then.

== Operation Enduring Love ==
In February, 2005, HomeMovie.Com launched Operation Enduring Love, a special program for family with loved ones deployed to Iraq or Afghanistan. Operation Enduring Love allowed friends and family to share up to 30 minutes of video footage free through the HomeMovie.Com website. The charitable effort was co-sponsored with CenturyTel, and recognized by many members of Congress, including U.S. Senator Patty Murray (WA), U.S. Senator Elizabeth Dole (NC), U.S. Senator Saxby Chambliss (GA), U.S. Congressman Doc Hastings (WA), U.S. Congressman Adam Smith (WA), and U.S. Congressman Walter B. Jones (NC).

In June 2005, Operation Enduring Love was recognized by U.S. Senator Patty Murray and received one of her annual "Golden Tennis Shoes" recognitions. Senator Murray stated: "Operation Enduring Love is a unique way to help connect our service members overseas with their families here at home. It's a touching example of how technology can bridge the distance and help unite the many families who are sacrificing for our country."

In October, 2010, the company launched a new website at MemoryHub.Com, and added photo scanning, slide scanning, negative scanning and film transfer services to their array of video conversion services.

== Professional services ==
In conjunction with their Consumer video editing service, HomeMovie.Com has also aimed its service at professional videographers a service aimed at professional videographers, and have worked with over 3,000 professional wedding and event videographers since 2000.

In 2003, HomeMovie.Com launched its Streaming WeddingDVD service for its customers, whereby full-length DVDs of weddings were streamed in their entirety over the Internet. It was the first effort to stream long-form video over the Internet in an Interactive DVD-Style format. In December 2004, HomeMovie.Com launched a partnership with the WeddingChannel.com to promote full-length video sharing of Weddings to brides across the country.

== See also ==
- Flickr
- Kodak EasyShare Gallery
- Online media center
- Photo sharing
- Video hosting service
- Video sharing
