= Funimation =

Defunct American video streaming service

- Final logo for the streaming service used from 2020 to 2024
- Former name: FunimationNow (2016–2020)
- Company type: Division
- Website type: OTT streaming platform
- Available in: 3 languages
- List of languages: English; Portuguese; Spanish
- Dissolved: April 2, 2024; 2 years ago
- Headquarters: Coppell, Texas, U.S.
- Country of origin: United States
- Area served: Worldwide (Note: Funimation directly operated in the United States, Canada (in English), Mexico, Chile, Colombia, Peru, and Brazil, in the United Kingdom and Ireland through Funimation UK and Ireland, and in Australia and New Zealand through Madman Anime.)
- Owner: Sony
- Industry: Entertainment; mass media
- Products: Streaming media; video on demand; digital distribution
- Services: Film distribution; Television distribution
- Website: funimation.com at the Wayback Machine (archived 2024-04-02)
- Commercial: Yes
- Registration: Required
- Launched: April 2009; 17 years ago
- Current status: Defunct (consolidated into Crunchyroll)

Funimation (Note: Formerly known as FunimationNow from 2016 to 2020.) was an American subscription video on-demand over-the-top streaming service. Launched in April 2009, the service was one of the leading distributors of anime and other foreign entertainment properties in North America. It streamed popular series, such as Dragon Ball, One Piece, YuYu Hakusho, My Hero Academia, Attack on Titan, Fairy Tail, Black Clover, Fruits Basket, Assassination Classroom and Tokyo Ghoul among many others.

The service and its parent company were acquired by Sony, who ran the service through Sony Pictures Television from 2017 to 2019 and then through Sony Pictures and Aniplex from 2019 to its closure in 2024. In 2021, Sony acquired Crunchyroll.

In March 2022, Funimation Global Group, the service's parent company, was rebranded as Crunchyroll, LLC and a large majority of its catalog was moved to Crunchyroll; despite this, the Funimation streaming service remained active and continued to distribute titles that were originally licensed by the Funimation company before the merger until it was shut down in April 2024.

== History ==
=== Origins ===
In the early 1990s, Japanese-born businessman Gen Fukunaga was approached by his uncle, Nagafumi Hori, who was working as a producer for Toei Company. Hori proposed that if Fukunaga could start a production company and raise enough money, Toei Animation would license the rights to the Dragon Ball franchise to the United States. Fukunaga met with co-worker Daniel Cocanougher, whose family owned a feed mill in Decatur, Texas, and convinced Cocanougher's family to sell their business and serve as an investor for his new company. The company was founded on May 9, 1994, as FUNimation Productions.

They initially collaborated with other companies on Dragon Ball and Dragon Ball Z, such as BLT Productions, Ocean Studios, Pioneer and Saban Entertainment. After two aborted attempts to bring the Dragon Ball franchise to television via first-run syndication, Cartoon Network began airing Dragon Ball Z as part of its Toonami programming block in 1998, which quickly became the highest-rated show on the block and garnered a large following. The success of Dragon Ball Z is credited for allowing Funimation to acquire other licensed titles.

=== Launch and beginning of Funimation Films ===
In April 2009, Funimation signed a deal with Toei Animation to stream several of its anime titles online through the Funimation website. On October 14, 2011, Funimation announced a partnership with Niconico, the English language version of Nico Nico Douga, to form the Funico brand for the licensing of anime for streaming and home video release. From this point on, virtually all titles simulcasted by Niconico were acquired by Funimation. On February 18, 2012, Funimation announced that it would launch its video streaming app on April 6, 2012.

In 2014, Funimation released Dragon Ball Z: Battle of Gods to theaters in partnership with Screenvision. Based on its success, Funimation launched its own theatrical division in December 2014. On June 22, 2015, Funimation and Universal Pictures Home Entertainment announced a multi-year home video distribution deal. The deal allowed UPHE to manage distribution and sales of Funimation's catalog of titles. Universal began distributing Funimation's titles in October of that year.

=== Rebranding as FunimationNow ===
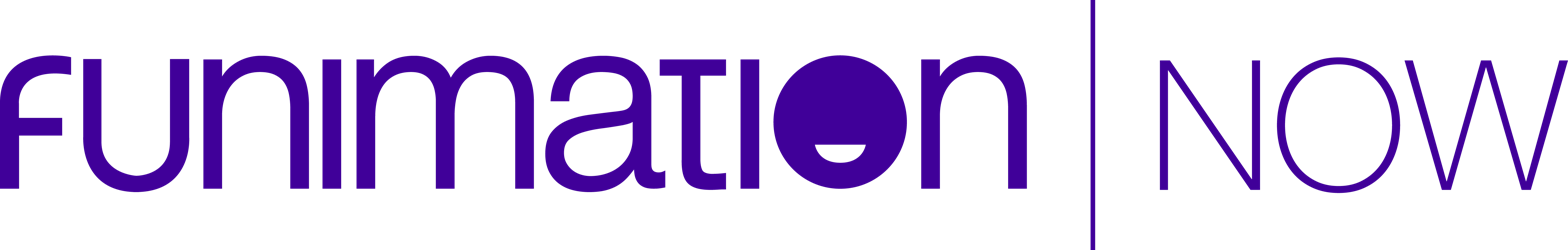
The FunimationNow logo used from 2016 to 2020

In January 7, 2016, Funimation introduced a new logo and announced the rebranding of their streaming platform as "FunimationNow". In April 2016, they launched their service in the UK and Ireland.

On September 8, 2016, Funimation announced a partnership with Crunchyroll. Select Funimation titles would be streamed subtitled on Crunchyroll, while select Crunchyroll titles would be streamed on FunimationNow, including upcoming dubbed content. In addition, Funimation would act as the distributor for Crunchyroll's home video catalog.

On May 18, 2017, Shout! Factory acquired the North American distribution rights to In This Corner of the World, with a U.S. theatrical release to take place on August 11, 2017, co-released by Funimation Films.

=== Acquisition by Sony Pictures Television ===
In May 2017, it was reported that Universal Studios and Sony Pictures Television were interested in purchasing Funimation; however, Universal decided not to proceed with the bidding. On July 31, 2017, Sony Pictures Television announced that it would buy a controlling 95% stake in Funimation for $143 million, a deal that was approved by the United States Department of Justice on August 22, 2017. This deal allowed Funimation to have synergies with Sony's Animax and Kids Station divisions and "direct access to the creative pipeline". The deal was closed on October 27, 2017.

On February 16, 2018, it was reported that Shout! Factory's Shout! Studios division acquired the U.S./Canadian distribution rights to Big Fish & Begonia and partnered with Funimation Films again for distribution. On July 12, 2018, it was announced that Funimation Films had picked up licensing rights for Dragon Ball Super: Broly in North America and that its English dub would premiere in theaters sometime in January 2019 in the United States and Canada, only around a month after its national premiere in Japan.

On August 7, 2018, AT&T fully acquired Otter Media, owner of Crunchyroll. On October 18, 2018, Funimation and Crunchyroll announced that their partnership with would end on November 9, 2018, as a result of Sony Pictures Television's acquisition of Funimation. Despite the home video releases being unaffected and still going on as planned, select Funimation content would be removed from Crunchyroll, and subtitled content would return to FunimationNow. Additionally, it was also announced that Funimation would be removed from Otter Media-owned streaming service VRV entirely, being replaced by Hidive. In December 2018, it was reported that another reason the partnership ended was due to a dispute concerning international expansion. On December 4, 2018, Funimation inked an exclusive multi-year first-look SVOD deal with Hulu.

On March 23, 2019, at AnimeJapan 2019, Funimation announced that they had partnered with Chinese streaming service Bilibili to jointly license anime titles for both the U.S. and Chinese markets.

On May 29, 2019, Funimation announced that they had acquired Manga Entertainment's UK branch, and immediately consolidated the former's UK business into the latter's. On July 5, 2019, Funimation announced at Anime Expo that they had reached a streaming partnership with Right Stuf Inc., with select titles from Nozomi Entertainment being made available on FunimationNow later in the year. On August 31, 2019, Aniplex of America announced on Twitter that they would be partnering with Funimation Films to co-release Rascal Does Not Dream of a Dreaming Girl theatrically in the U.S. on October 2, 2019, and in Canada on October 4, 2019.

=== SPT / Aniplex joint venture and streaming consolidation ===
On September 24, 2019, Sony Pictures Television and Aniplex announced that they were consolidating their international anime streaming businesses under a new joint venture, Funimation Global Group, LLC., with Funimation general manager Colin Decker leading the joint venture. The joint venture would operate under Funimation's branding, and allow Funimation to acquire and distribute titles with Aniplex subsidiaries Wakanim, Madman Anime and AnimeLab. The first title under the joint venture, Fate/Grand Order - Absolute Demonic Front: Babylonia, would receive a 30-day exclusivity on FunimationNow, AnimeLab and Wakanim, and provide Funimation exclusive rights to the English dub for one year.

In December 2019, Funimation launched a "Decade of Anime" poll in which fans voted for their favorite anime across multiple categories.

On January 24, 2020, Funimation announced it would be merging its online catalog into AnimeLab for Australian and New Zealand audiences, and would shut down FunimationNow for Australia and New Zealand on March 30.

On May 1, 2020, Funimation announced that they formed a partnership with Kodansha Comics to host a series of weekly watch parties. On May 4, Funimation announced that they had struck a deal with NIS America to stream select titles on FunimationNow.

On July 3, 2020, Funimation announced at FunimationCon that they would expand their streaming service to Latin America, starting with Mexico and Brazil in Q4 2020, with one of the first dubbed titles released being Tokyo Ghoul:re. Funimation later revealed that they would launch their Latin American services in December 2020. However, they launched their service early on November 18, 2020.

On September 9, 2020, Funimation announced that they had reached a distribution partnership with Viz Media, with Viz Media titles being made available to stream on Funimation's website. The deal was made after select Viz titles such as Part I of Naruto and the first 75 episodes of Hunter × Hunter were previously made available on FunimationNow. On December 2, 2020, Brazilian TV channel Loading announced a content partnership with Sony Pictures Entertainment. Funimation titles being included in the partnership was hinted at, but not confirmed. Five days later, it was officially confirmed that Funimation titles would be included in the partnership.

On November 24, 2020, Funimation announced they had partnered with Sunrise to stream select Gundam titles such as Mobile Suit Gundam, Mobile Suit Gundam SEED, and later Mobile Suit Gundam Wing and Mobile Suit Zeta Gundam. Some Gundam titles already streamed on Funimation prior to said partnership like Mobile Suit Gundam: Iron-Blooded Orphans.

On December 9, 2020, Sony Pictures Entertainment announced that it would acquire Crunchyroll from AT&T's WarnerMedia (later spun out by AT&T and merged with Discovery, Inc. to form Warner Bros. Discovery) for a total of US$1.175 billion in cash, placing the company under Funimation once the acquisition was finalized. The acquisition of Crunchyroll was completed on August 9, 2021, with Sony stating in their press release that they would create a unified anime subscription using their anime businesses as soon as possible.

On April 12, 2021, it was announced that subsidiary Manga Entertainment would officially be rebranding as Funimation UK in the UK and Ireland, starting on April 19, 2021. On June 10, 2021, it was announced AnimeLab would begin the process of rebranding and transitioning its services to Funimation in Australia and New Zealand, on June 17, 2021. On June 16, 2021, Funimation launched in Colombia, Chile, and Peru.

On September 1, 2021, Funimation and Gonzo announced a partnership to upload select remastered titles on their respective YouTube channels until November 30. These titles were Ragnarok the Animation, Witchblade and Burst Angel.

On January 25, 2022, Crunchyroll announced that they were going to release Jujutsu Kaisen 0 in theaters on March 18, 2022, in the United States and Canada. The film launched in over 1,500 theaters, as well as some IMAX theatres, in both sub and dub. They also stated that the feature would be coming soon to theaters in the United Kingdom, Ireland, Australia, New Zealand, France, Germany, and Latin America among other countries. This was the first and only Crunchyroll film to be distributed in association with Funimation Films.

On March 1, 2022, it was announced that the Funimation, Wakanim and VRV SVOD services would be consolidated into Crunchyroll. Despite this, the Funimation streaming service remained in operation, and continued to simulcast newer titles acquired by Crunchyroll, LLC after the merger.

On February 7, 2024, it was announced that the Funimation app and website would shut down on April 2, 2024, and that all Funimation subscribers could choose to transfer their account data to Crunchyroll until then. As part of the merger of services, legacy Funimation subscribers would see a price increase and users would lose access to their digital library. Following complaints from users, Crunchyroll president Rahul Purini stated that the company would work with customers to provide "appropriate value" for their digital copies.

== Programming ==
=== Funimation Channel ===
Funimation Channel
- Country: United States
- Broadcast area: Northern America
- Network: Colours TV (2006–2008)
- Headquarters: West Palm Beach, Florida

Programming
- Languages: English; Spanish (via SAP audio track)
- Picture format: 1080i HDTV (downscaled to letterboxed 480i for the SDTV feed)

Ownership
- Owner: Olympusat
- Parent: Funimation

History
- Launched: September 29, 2005; 21 years ago
- Closed: December 31, 2015; 10 years ago
- Replaced by: Toku

Funimation Entertainment, along with OlympuSAT, launched the Funimation Channel on September 29, 2005, the second 24-hour anime digital cable network in North America (the first being A.D. Vision's Anime Network). OlympuSAT was the exclusive distributor of the channel.

On March 23, 2006, a syndicated block was announced for Colours TV. A few months later, it was announced that the channel was launched in a few cities via VHF and UHF digital signals. Both services were discontinued in favor for a more successful expansion on digital cable, fiber optics and DBS systems. The channel launched its HD feed on September 27, 2010. On December 31, 2015, Funimation and OlympuSAT ended their deal and no longer broadcasts Funimation titles on the channel. The television channel was replaced by Toku, while Funimation announced plans to relaunch Funimation Channel in 2016.

Back in 2007, Funimation licensed Revolutionary Girl Utena: The Movie, the Record of Lodoss War series, the Project A-ko series, Urusei Yatsura: Beautiful Dreamer and Grave of the Fireflies from Central Park Media and played them on the Funimation Channel on television in the United States. (Note: Although Anime Network never aired Grave of the Fireflies on TV in the United States and Canada, it streamed the film on video on demand in the two countries.) In 2009, they licensed Buso Renkin, Honey and Clover, Hunter × Hunter, Nana and Monster from Viz Media (their fellow rival) for the channel. (Note: Later, Viz Media streamed Nana, Buso Renkin and Honey and Clover on their Neon Alley service, but Hunter × Hunter (the 1999 anime, not the 2011 reboot), and Monster were never streamed on that service.) They also licensed Ninja Nonsense and Boogiepop Phantom from Right Stuf Inc.'s Nozomi Entertainment division for it as well. The only title licensed for Funimation Channel which was not licensed by Funimation, neither Viz Media, nor Nozomi Entertainment or Central Park Media was Haré+Guu, which was licensed for North American distribution by AN Entertainment and Bang Zoom! Entertainment and had its North American DVD release published by Funimation, while its licensors were the producers. The only Enoki USA titles Funimation licensed for Funimation Channel were Revolutionary Girl Utena and His and Her Circumstances.

=== Digital ===
Funimation's catalog of series and films, as well as official Japanese simulcasts, were available for streaming on their website and dedicated apps. They streamed over 800 titles from their catalog, Aniplex of America, Viz Media, Nozomi Entertainment, NIS America, and TMS Entertainment among other distributors. Their titles were available for streaming in the United States, Canada, the United Kingdom, Ireland, Australia, New Zealand, Mexico, Brazil, Colombia, Chile, Peru, and by Wakanim they were also available in select parts of Europe, Africa, and Asia. Via Crunchyroll, they also have over 5 million subscribers and 120 million registered users worldwide with over 1,200 anime titles, 200 dorama, and 80 manga currently available from a wide array of distributors such as Sentai Filmworks and Discotek Media.

On September 19, 2006, Funimation created an official channel on YouTube where they upload advertisements for box sets, as well as clips and preview episodes of their licensed series. In September 2008, they began distributing full episodes of series on Hulu. In April 2009, Funimation began distributing full episodes of series at Veoh. In February 2012, Crackle began streaming select titles from Funimation, joining titles previously acquired from Funimation for their localized Animax hub.

A dedicated Funimation streaming app launched for the Xbox 360 and PlayStation 3 in June and December 2014, respectively. The app later launched on PlayStation 4 and Xbox One platforms in March and July 2015, respectively. A Nintendo Switch app launched in December 2020.

=== SimulDub ===
In January 2014, English dubbed episodes of Space Dandy premiered on Adult Swim's Toonami programming block a day before the Japanese broadcast; one of the rare occasions an anime series premiered in the United States before Japan. Funimation would later introduce a new "SimulDub" program in October 2014, in which English dubs of their simulcast titles would premiere within weeks after their subtitled airing. This practice began with SimulDub versions of Psycho-Pass 2 and Laughing Under the Clouds, episodes of which were streamed roughly three weeks to one month following their original Japanese broadcast.

On March 18, 2020, Funimation announced that production of SimulDubs would be delayed due to the COVID-19 pandemic; Subtitled simulcasts would continue as scheduled. On April 10, 2020, Funimation announced that an episode of My Hero Academia had been recorded and would be released on April 12. Funimation would later announce the scheduled release dates for SimulDubs that were produced during the COVID-19 pandemic.

Following the corporate name change to Crunchyroll, LLC in 2022, the practice of SimulDubs officially continued with series such as Spy × Family, the second season of Classroom of the Elite, and Tomo-chan Is a Girl!.

== Availability ==
The streaming service was available through Funimation's official website in the United States, the United Kingdom, Canada, Ireland, Australia, New Zealand, Mexico, Chile, Colombia, Peru and Brazil. In select parts of Europe, Africa, and Asia, it was available via Wakanim.

The Funimation app was also available on digital media players (Apple TV, Amazon Fire TV, and Roku), smart TVs (Android TV, Chromecast, Samsung, and LG Electronics), video game consoles (PlayStation 4, PlayStation 5, Xbox One, Xbox Series X/S, and Nintendo Switch) and smartphones (iOS, Android, and Amazon Kindle).
