= FC2 (portal) =

Japanese blogging host

- Website type: Blog, Video hosting service
- Available in: Japanese (primary), English, Chinese, Thai, Korean, German, Spanish, Russian, French, Indonesian, Portuguese, Vietnamese
- Headquarters: Las Vegas, Nevada, U.S.
- Subsidiaries: Veoh Networks, Inc. (defunct, integrated into FC2 Video)
- Website: fc2.com
- Commercial: Yes
- Registration: Required for many services, Free or Premium
- Launched: July 20, 1999; 27 years ago
- Current status: Active

FC2 (founded July 20, 1999) is a popular Japanese blogging host, the third most popular video hosting service in Japan (after YouTube and Niconico) and a web hosting company headquartered in Las Vegas. It was the 11th most popular website in Japan overall (as of January 2018).

== Overview ==
FC2 is a US corporation, and according to an interview article by representative Takahiro Rihiro published in the magazine "Yahoo! Internet Guide" May issue in 2006, as of 2006, It is run by two people, his brother Takahashi Takahiro and his younger brother Takahashi Riyo, with 17 full-time employees and approximately 30 part-time staff.

FC2 Blog launched in October 2004 and celebrated its tenth anniversary in 2014.

On April 14, 2025, FC2 announced that it will close FC2 Web, its free website hosting service, on June 30, 2025, citing the aging of its system and server. The service, which was started in 2001, later closed on June 30, 2025, and the service moved to FC2 Website.

=== Business ===
It offers free and paid various web services in various languages such as Japanese, including rental server, domain, blog, chat, access analysis, bulletin board, diary, access counter, SNS, etc.

The same ID and password can be used in the service of FC2. It is characterized that service addition can be registered with one ID.

=== Decreased number of users ===
According to a survey by Nielsen in 2016, the number of PC users dropped to 8th in Japan (3rd from 2014 to 2015), and the number of users decreased.

Due to the decreasing number of users in the last few years of FC2 Web's life, new registrations for the service have ended.

== List of services ==
=== Hosting ===
- FC2 Blog (FC2ブログ)
- FC2 Website (FC2ホームページ)
- FC2 Rental Server (FC2レンタルサーバー)
- FC2 Rental Server Lite (FC2レンタルサーバーLite)
- FC2 Mobile Website (FC2ケータイホームページ)

=== Streaming ===
- FC2 Video (FC2動画)
- FC2 Live (FC2ライブ)
- FC2SayMove!
- Sunflower Video/Himawari Video (ひまわり動画)
- FC2 Net Radio (FC2ねとらじ)
- Veoh (defunct, redirects to FC2 Video)

=== SNS ===
- FC2 Game (FC2ゲーム)
- FC2 Summary (FC2まとめ)
- FC2WiFI
- FC2WiFI Owner (FC2WiFi オーナー)
- FC2 The Bulletin Board (FC2ザ掲示板)
- FC2SNS
- FC2 Novel (FC2小説)
- FC2 Know-How (FC2ノウハウ)
- FC2 Miniblog PIYO (FC2ミニブログPIYO)

=== E-commerce ===
- FC2 Shopping Cart (FC2ショッピングカート)
- FC2 Shopping Mall (FC2ショッピングモール)
- FC2 Content Market (FC2コンテンツマーケット)

=== Tools ===
- FC2 App (FC2アプリ)
- FC2 Domain (FC2ドメイン)
- FC2 Access Analysis (FC2アクセス解析)
- FC2 Mail Form (FC2メールフォーム)
- FC2 Text Ad (FC2テキストアド)
- FC2 Affiliation (FC2アフィリエイト)
- FC2 Counter (FC2カウンター)
- FC2 Bulletin Board (FC2掲示板)
- FC2 Chat (FC2チャット)
- FC2 Profile (FC2プロフ)
- FC2 Website Ranking (FC2アクセスランキング)
- FC2 Folder
- FC2 Hakushu/FC2 Applause (FC2拍手)
- FC2WIKI
- FC2 Blog Ranking (FC2ブログランキング)
- FC2 Poll (FC2投票)
- FC2 Icon (FC2アイコン)
- FC2 Diary (FC2絵日記)
- FC2 SEO Ranking (FC2 SEOランキング)
- FC2 Image Reduction (FC2画像縮小)
- FC2 Mobile Conversion/FC2 Keitai Henkan (FC2携帯変換)

== Controversy ==
Due to FC2's physical presence in the United States, it has been known to allow hosting of pornographic, pirated, and slanderous content but is now being enforced with strict rules. Until 2012 it was very difficult to sue and get FC2 to release information on its users. This changed somewhat with an amendment to Japan's Code of Civil Procedure for foreign entities operating in Japan in 2012 and the ensuing injunctions that followed against FC2.

One of the founders, Takahashi Rihiro was arrested in Kansai International Airport in Japan by the police on charges of distributing obscene videos.
