= Qlipso =

Israeli-American technology company

Qlipso Inc.
- Website type: Multiuser Content-Sharing Platform
- Owners: Jon Goldman, Co-founder and Chief Executive Officer
- Creators: Ishay Pnueli and Jon Goldman
- Employees: 754
- Website: http://qlipso.com/
- Registration: Free

Qlipso Inc. is an Israeli-American technology company, which builds and operates multi-user content-sharing platforms for Flash-based media. The company's social-viewing platform provided users the ability to view and share various forms of media with others, live or asynchronously.

Since April 2010, the company holds the assets of the online video portal Veoh. In May 2012, Qlipso launched a new personal social video sharing platform, called Mixin, which allows users to find their friend's favorite videos, interact with them on the video itself, and discover the trending videos online in a personalized matter. The platform gained more than 200,000 users in the first days after the official launch.

== Acquisition of Veoh ==
On April 8, 2010, it was announced that Qlipso had acquired substantially all of the assets of online video portal Veoh, which in 2008 had approximately 17 million unique visitors monthly. Qlipso used the acquisition to add a broad and established base of users, along with revenue, to its content-sharing service, while integrating its social-viewing features into Veoh's mainstream online video platform.

== Management and Funding ==
Qlipso is led by an international team of established video game and digital media industry veterans. Qlipso was founded in September 2007 by Ishay Pnueli, a veteran of the video game and technology industries. Jon Goldman, who previously founded and served as CEO of the video game development company Foundation 9 Entertainment, joined Qlipso as CEO in early 2009. Qlipso was incubated and funded by Jerusalem Venture Partners and now headquartered in Los Angeles, California, with additional offices in New York City and Jerusalem, Israel.
