= GoMeta =

American software company

GoMeta is an American software company headquartered in San Diego. The company was founded by Dmitry Shapiro, Sean Thielen, and Jonathan Miller in September 2016.

GoMeta's Koji platform (sold to Linktree) lets non-technical individuals create and publish mini apps, progressive web applications that run on all devices and operating systems, and embed inside of social networks and messengers.

Previously, GoMeta created Metaverse Studio, a drag and drop editor for creating Augmented Reality (AR) experiences. The company suspended support for Metaverse Studio in 2019.

== Overview ==
GoMeta's Koji platform is a browser-based low-code development platform for creating web applications. Independent developers publish templates for apps and games and users remix those templates to create new applications. Alongside the underlying application code, users have access to low-code visual abstractions, including tools that allow easy manipulation of 3D models, sounds, and images. These visual abstractions are defined by the template creator in the original application bundle.

Koji applications are full-stack web applications, and often include complex functionality like leaderboards, databases, realtime multiplayer, and calls to third-party APIs.

GoMeta’s earlier platform, Metaverse Studio, is a web application that allows users to create interactive Augmented Reality experiences without any coding. Using Metaverse Studio, users can build AR experiences that incorporate technologies such as GPS, iBeacons, 3D objects, 360-degree video, photo filters, and digital coupons, in addition to commonly used features of programming like logic, probability, collection of user input, and session management.

== History ==
GoMeta came to media attention in 2016 with a series of Augmented Reality scavenger hunts created in Metaverse Studio. Participants followed clues in the Metaverse App that were tied to real-world locations, and the winners of the scavenger hunts received cash prizes.

In 2016, GoMeta raised $3 million in seed funding from 23 angel investors including Mike Jones, former CEO of Myspace, Michael Eisner, former CEO of Disney, Art Bilger of Akamai, Loïc Le Meur, founder of LeWeb, Richard Gingras, head of Google News, Don Dodge, and Scott Kurnit.

In 2019, GoMeta raised an additional $3.1 million from BITKRAFT Esports Ventures, MTGx, Next 10 Ventures, and Moonshots Capital.

In 2020, GoMeta raised $10 million, led by Galaxy Interactive, to continue development of its Koji platform.

In January 2022, GoMeta raised a $20 million Series B, led by Jump Capital.
