= Dmitry Shapiro =

American entrepreneur

Dmitry Shapiro is an American entrepreneur. He is the founder and CEO of GoMeta, Inc. which operates MindStudio.ai, an AI Agent building platform (over 200k AI Agents deployed). Prior to MindStudio, Dmitry was CEO of Koji, an App Store and platform for building social mini-apps that can be integrated into various Links In Bios. Koji was purchased by LinkTree in 2021.

Shapiro left Google in order to found GoMeta.

Prior to GoMeta, Shapiro led social product initiatives at Google (May 2021 - Aug 2016). Prior to that, he was Chief Technology Officer at MySpace

Prior to MySpace, Shapiro created the video sharing site Veoh in 2005, which was launched a few months after YouTube. Veoh raised $70M in venture capital from a prominent list of investors that included Spark Capital, Michael Eisner, Time Warner Investments, Adobe, Intel, John Dolgen and Tom Freston (two former heads of Viacom) and Goldman Sachs.

Prior to Veoh, Shapiro founded Akonix Systems, Inc, an enterprise cybersecurity company, which raised $34M in venture capital, and was later acquired by Quest Software].

== Education and career ==
Shapiro was born in Russia but later moved to the United States. Shapiro graduated with a BS in Electrical Engineering from the Georgia Institute of Technology in 1992. From 1995-1999, Shapiro was the Head of Web Development at Fujitsu Business Communications.

After his time at Fujitsu, Shapiro was the Director of Product and Engineering at CollegeClub.com, a social network which he helped grow from 200,000 members to over 4 million.

In 2000, Shapiro founded Akonix Systems Inc., a network security company, where he was CEO, and later CTO, and Head of Product until 2004. Akonix built a Perimeter Security Gateway that performed deep packet inspection on corporate networks, detected unauthorized network traffic, and helped IT managers in its management. Akonix raised $34 Million and was acquired by Quest Software Inc. in 2008.

In December 2004, Shapiro founded Veoh Networks, Inc., where he was the CEO and Head of Product. Veoh became one of the largest online video websites, competing with Hulu and YouTube. The company raised over $70 million and had over 28 million monthly users before getting sued by Universal Music for copyright infringement. While Veoh won the court case and two appeals, the company was unable to sustain itself as Universal Music also sued Veoh’s investors, forcing Veoh to be sold.

After Veoh, Shapiro was CTO at Myspace Music, where he was responsible for product and engineering.

Shapiro was recruited by Google in 2012 as a Group Product Manager, working on Social Graph, Identity, Content Discovery, and API Infrastructure.

In September 2016, Shapiro co-founded GoMeta, Inc., where he is CEO. GoMeta owns and operates Koji—The App Store for Creator Economy. To date, GoMeta has received $36 million in funding and has employees in San Diego, San Francisco, New York, Fort Lauderdale, and Barcelona.

In October 2024, 404 Media reported that Shapiro and Sean Thielen were launching a prototype of an app that describes itself as “AI-powered infrastructure for shaping and managing narratives in the modern world”, which 404 Media criticised as a tool of social media "manipulation".
