= Kodak Gallery =

Online digital image website

- Website type: Photo
- Owner: Kodak
- Creator: Ofoto
- Website: KodakGallery.com
- Commercial: Yes
- Registration: Yes
- Launched: June 1999
- Current status: Inactive

The Kodak Gallery was Kodak's consumer online digital photography web site. It featured online photo storage, sharing, viewing on a mobile phone, getting Kodak prints of digital pictures, and creating personalized photo gifts. The service was originally launched in 1999 as Ofoto, and was acquired by Kodak in 2001, renamed Kodak EasyShare Gallery in 2005, and shortly thereafter shortened to Kodak Gallery. At its peak in 2008, it served over 60 million users and billions of images. Subsequent to the bankruptcy of the parent Kodak, Shutterfly placed a stalking horse bid on Kodak Gallery on March 1, 2012, for $23.8 million. Kodak Gallery was shut down on July 2, 2012. Photos were transferred to Shutterfly.

== History ==
Ofoto's online photography service was started in June 1999, in Berkeley, California. The company was founded by Lisa Gansky and Kamran Mohsenin. Gansky had previously been CEO of 1990s internet pioneer GNN, while Mohsenin had previously run Tunes Network, Inc., parent of the Tunes.com music discovery Website. The Ofoto website launched to the public on December 13, 1999, the same day as competing service Shutterfly. While Shutterfly was funded in part by Silicon Valley businessman James Clark, Ofoto was funded in part by Jim Barksdale, Clark's former partner and co-worker from Netscape. This led to the brief "Clark vs. Bark" photo wars. Ofoto started by simply allowing users to upload JPEG images to the online service, to share online photo albums with friends, and to purchase physical silver-halide prints of photos. In 2000, Ofoto added a 35mm online film processing service and an online frame store. In following years, Ofoto added 4-color offset printed invitations and cards, and services for mobile phones.

In May 2001, Ofoto was purchased by Eastman Kodak. Ofoto, Inc. became a wholly owned subsidiary of Kodak and later became the Kodak Imaging Network, Inc. In 2005, the Ofoto web service was rebranded as the Kodak EasyShare Gallery. In October 2006, Kodak Gallery launched a new line of products designed by American crafts and home decorating expert Martha Stewart. In July 2008, Kodak decided to mail the Kodak Gallery users obliging them to purchase something through their website. If not, consumers would lose their pictures as Kodak blocked their photo albums after their proposed deadline. Kodak Gallery received a number of awards. In the July 2006 issue, PC World named Kodak EasyShare Gallery one of The 100 Best Products of the Year. In August 2007, the Wall Street Journal selected Gallery as the winner in an online photo services shootout. In October 2008, the Boston Globe selected Kodak Gallery as the winner in a review of online photo service web sites.

== Free services ==
Uploading photos to Kodak Gallery was free, but unless purchases (e.g., of prints) were made on the site, the pictures were only stored for 90 days and then deleted. The site's terms of service specified that "To maintain free storage, you need to meet the following minimum purchase requirement within 90 days of first uploading images, and then every 12 months thereafter ... If you do not purchase the required amount as set forth above from us for a period of 12 months, we may delete the images stored in your account." The minimum purchases required was between $5 and $20, depending on the amount of pictures stored. Kodak received some negative press for deleting photos if users did not order prints after a certain amount of time. Digital photo frame customers complained that web connected photo frame (often costing $300 or more) galleries were not exempted from the policy. Further criticism came from a former executive who alleged that she was wrongfully fired for complaining about a plan to reduce image quality in order to save on storage costs without giving adequate notice to customers.

== Products and services provided for a fee ==
In addition to standard custom photo merchandise (such as prints, photo books, stickers, calendars, mugs, cards, apparel, etc.), Kodak Gallery also provided the following services:

- Archive CDs
- DVD slideshows via Photoshow by Roxio, a division of Sonic Solutions
- PhotoStamps (via Stamps.com)
- Traditional picture frames for digital prints
- Digital Picture Frames along with preloaded picture cards
- Kodak Gallery Premier Service – for monthly or yearly fee, provides a unique web address, full-resolution downloads, optional password protection, credit if photos destroyed in a natural disaster or due to hard drive crash or theft

== See also ==
- Image hosting service
- Photo sharing
- Wolk v. Kodak Imaging Network Inc.
