= Veoh =

Defunct video streaming website

- Founded: September 21, 2005
- Dissolved: November 11, 2024
- Successor: FC2 Video
- Founders: Dmitry Shapiro and Ted Dunning
- Current status: Defunct as of November 11, 2024

Veoh (/ˈviːoʊ/) was an American video-sharing website, created in September 2005 by Dmitry Shapiro and Ted Dunning.

Originally launched as a virtual television network application, Veoh re-established itself as a video-sharing website in March 2006. During the mid-2000s, it was one of the largest video-sharing websites, though eventually began to be superseded by YouTube, Dailymotion and Vimeo. In February 2010, the company filed for Chapter 7 bankruptcy, until it was saved two months later by the technology company Qlipso Inc. In June 2013, it was sold to Japanese blogging host FC2, Inc.

On October 17, 2024, Veoh announced on its homepage that the website would be shutting down on November 11, 2024. After the closure, all visitors were automatically redirected to FC2 Video. This message was later amended, announcing that Veoh's video library had been uploaded to FC2 Video, and that all former Veoh users could log into FC2 Video with their former Veoh credentials to access their content.

== History ==
Veoh was founded by web-developer Dmitry Shapiro, who had the idea of creating a video-sharing website in 2004 during his honeymoon, wanting to create a platform for anyone to be able to record and share video online. It raised around $70 million from venture capital and media investors. Time Warner, Michael Eisner's Tornante Company, Spark Capital, Shelter Capital Partners, Tom Freston's Firefly3 LLC, Jonathan Dolgen (former chairman of Viacom Entertainment Group), Intel, and Goldman Sachs were all major investors.

The company launched an early version of its distribution technology in September 2005, and debuted its full beta service in March 2006. Veoh officially launched (out of beta) in February 2007.

In addition to the user-generated content that Veoh broadcasts, Veoh has distributed content from major media companies via its VeohTV Beta including CBS, ABC, The WB, Viacom's MTV Networks, ESPN, FEARNet, Billboard, Ford Models, Us Weekly, TV Guide, and others. Independent creators who produced Veoh include NextNewNetworks, 60 Frames, Can We Do That?, Goodnight Burbank, and Dave and Tom.

The company received media attention after Michael Eisner, a former Disney chairman, joined the board. In April 2006, he was one of the investors (along with Time Warner) in the $12.5 million second round of financing for Veoh and re-affirmed his status in August 2007 as an investor in the company's $25 million Series C financing round.

On June 23, 2006, IO Group, Inc. filed a complaint against Veoh Networks, Inc. in the U.S. District Court for California's Northern District. The Court has granted the Veoh's motion for summary judgment, that it was entitled to the statute's "safe harbor" provision.

On September 4, 2007, Universal Music Group Recordings, Inc. et al. filed a complaint against Veoh Networks, Inc. et al. in the California Central District Court. On September 9, 2009, the court ruled in favor of Veoh, stating that Veoh was taking the necessary steps to stop copyright infringement. Universal Music Group planned to appeal the decision. On December 20, 2011, the appeals court upheld the original dismissal.

In late May 2008, Veoh discontinued operating in many countries. The company stated that the decision was made in order to focus on the 34 markets in which it has the most viewers.

It was reported that Veoh attracted approximately 17 million unique monthly visitors, according to a Quantcast.com study published in 2008.

On May 31, 2008, upon trying to access the site from a Latvian IP address a screen displayed the message: "Veoh is no longer available in Latvia & Mauritius." Without prior notice, users from these countries were denied the ability to back up the contents they have contributed to the website. In June 2008, visitors (IP addresses) in the vast majority of countries, including Asia, portions of Europe, Africa, Central America, and South America, reported being blocked or experiencing a similar message for their region. Gaude Paez, a spokesperson told NewTeeVee.com "The markets we are exiting collectively represent less than 10 percent of our viewer base." She maintained that the decision was "not about saving resources but rather refocusing those resources." Recently, however, the restriction has been removed from certain territories such as Puerto Rico. Indian users reported that the Veoh restrictions were lifted for a month, yet came back in August.

In April 2009, following layoffs in November 2008, Veoh reduced its staff by 25 more to 45 remaining employees and reinstated Dmitry Shapiro as its CEO, replacing Steve Mitgang.

=== Chapter 7 bankruptcy ===
In February 2010, Shapiro, indicated on his blog that "the distraction of the legal battles, and the challenges of the broader macro-economic climate have led to our Chapter 7 bankruptcy." On April 7, 2010, it was announced that Israeli blogging host Qlipso had acquired Veoh out of bankruptcy for an undisclosed sum, who aimed to use the acquisition to add users and revenue to its blogging and content sharing service.

As of March 30, 2009, Veoh also blocked the Czech Republic, Lebanon, Malaysia and Serbia. Egypt, Romania, Martinique and Pakistan were also blocked in June. Turkey, Thailand and the UAE were blocked as of October 2009. The ban on Malaysia has since been removed. As of September 2010 site was accessible again from Serbia, but starting of December 2010 access was removed once again. Veoh is also blocked in Saudi Arabia, Bahrain, and Mongolia.

As of July 26, 2011 service has been restored to these blocked countries. However, as of April 2012, users from Macau are still being blocked, with the message "Veoh is no longer available in MACAO. If you are not in MACAO or think you have received this message in error, please go to veoh.com and report the issue."

In June 2013, Qlipso sold Veoh to Japanese blogging host FC2 for an undisclosed sum. By the time FC2 had acquired Veoh, it had already fallen behind sites such as YouTube, Dailymotion and Vimeo, and was not a major competitor in the video-sharing space.

Thank you for using Veoh (veoh.com).

We regret to inform you that Veoh will be shutting down on November 11, 2024, at UTC 6:00.

We would like to express our deepest gratitude to our users who have supported Veoh up until now.

A separate announcement will be sent to all video uploaders. Please log in to your account to view the details.

Thank you for your understanding and cooperation.

Sincerely, Veoh

—Official closure statement as it appeared on Veoh.com.

=== Closure ===
On October 17, 2024, Veoh announced it would be shutting down on November 11, 2024. A reason for the closure was not cited. After the closure, all visitors were redirected to FC2 Video.

== See also ==
- Comparison of video services
- IO Group, Inc. v. Veoh Networks, Inc.
- UMG Recordings, Inc. v. Shelter Capital Partners LLC
