= Perfect 10, Inc. v. CCBill, LLC =

- Court: United States Court of Appeals for the Ninth Circuit
- Full case name: Perfect 10, Inc., v. CCBill, LLC; Cavecreek Wholesale Internet Exchange d/b/a Cwie LLC
- Argued: December 4, 2006
- Decided: March 29, 2007
- Citation: 488 F.3d 1102

Case history
- Prior history: 2:02-cv-07624, 340 F. Supp. 2d 1077 (C.D. Cal. 2004), affirmed in part, reversed in part and remanded, 481 F.3d 751 (9th Cir. 2007).
- Subsequent history: Cert. denied, 552 U.S. 1062 (2007).

Court membership
- Judges sitting: Stephen Reinhardt, Alex Kozinski, Milan Smith

Case opinions
- Majority: Smith, joined by unanimous

Laws applied
- Digital Millennium Copyright Act, 17 U.S.C. § 512; Communications Decency Act, 47 U.S.C. § 230

Perfect 10, Inc. v. CCBill LLC, 488 F.3d 1102 (9th Cir. 2007), is a U.S. court case between a publisher of an adult entertainment magazine and the webhosting, connectivity, and payment service companies. The plaintiff Perfect 10 asserted that defendants CCBill (payment service company) and CWIE (webhosting and connectivity service company) violated copyright, trademark, and state law violation of right of publicity laws, unfair competition, false and misleading advertising by providing services to websites that posted images stolen from Perfect 10's magazine and website. Defendants sought to invoke statutory safe harbor exemptions from copyright infringement liability under the Digital Millennium Copyright Act, 17 U.S.C. § 512, and from liability for state law unfair competition, false advertising claims and right of publicity based on Section 230 of the Communications Decency Act, 47 U.S.C. § 230(c)(1).

== Facts ==
The plaintiff, Perfect 10 (P10), is a publisher of an adult entertainment magazine and the owner of the subscription website perfect10.com. The website features around 5,000 images of models that are created by the company that are accessible to only registered paying members. P10 holds publicity rights on many of the models in these images. It also has the registered U.S. copyrights for images and owns several related registered trademarks and service marks.

The defendant CWIE provides webhosting and related Internet connectivity service to various websites. In particular, the company provides "ping, power and pipe" services by making sure that the server is on, power is provided to the server, and the clients are connected to the Internet via a data center connection.

The defendant CCBill provide payment services that let consumers use credit cards or checks to pay e-commerce venues.

On August 10, 2001, P10 sent letters and emails to Thomas A. Fisher, the Executive Vice-President and the designated agent to receive notices of infringement of CCBill and CWIE, claiming that the two companies' clients were infringing P10 copyrights.

== Case history ==
On September 30, 2002, P10 filed lawsuit against the defendants alleging copyright and trademark violations, state law violation of right of publicity laws, unfair competition, false and misleading advertising, and Racketeer Influenced and Corrupt Organizations Act (RICO) claims, because the defendants provided services to websites that posted stolen images from P10's magazine and website. In favor of CCBill and CWIE, based on the Digital Millennium Copyright Act (DMCA), the district court found that CCBill and CWIE qualified for certain statutory safe harbors from copyright infringement liability, and they are also immune from liability for state law unfair competition and false advertising claims under the Communications Decency Act (CDA). In favor of P10, the court found the defendants violated P10's publicity right, and requested defendants to pay for P10's costs and attorney's fees under the Copyright Act.

Both sides cross-appealed to the United States Court of Appeals for the Ninth Circuit against the above holdings.

== Safe harbors ==
The DMCA established certain safe harbors to "provide protection from liability for: transitory digital network communications; system caching; information residing on systems or networks at the direction of users; and information location tools." (17 U.S.C §§ 512(a)-(d))

P10 alleged that CCBill and CWIE did not qualify for the safe harbors protection for various reasons.

=== Reasonably implemented policy ===
To be eligible for any of the four safe harbors, a service provider must satisfy a series of conditions (17 U.S.C § 512(i)). One such condition requires the service provider to adopt and reasonably implement a policy that will terminate users who are repeat infringers in appropriate circumstances.

In this case, the court further explained that a service provider implements a policy if it has a working notification system, a procedure for dealing with DMCA-compliant notifications, and if it does not actively prevent copyright owners from collecting information needed to issue complaints. An implementation is reasonable if, under "appropriate circumstances," the service provider terminates users who repeatedly or blatantly infringe copyright.

==== "Implementation" ====
P10 referenced a single page from CCBill and CWIE's "DMCA Log," and showed some missing webmaster names in the spreadsheet. P10 argued that CCBill and CWIE failed to keep track of repeatedly infringing webmasters, thereby preventing the implementation of their policies. However, the remainder of the log, which contains email addresses and/or names of webmasters and a chart included in the interrogatory responses (December 11, 2003), indicated that CCBill and CWIE did largely keep track of the webmaster for each website.

The Ninth Circuit upheld the district court's finding that P10 had not proved CCBill's and CWIE's failure to implement a repeat infringer policy.

==== "Reasonableness" ====
Section 512(c) protects service provider from being liable for monetary relief if it does not know of infringement, or if it acts "expeditiously to remove, or disable access to, the material" when it has actual knowledge, is aware of facts or circumstances from which infringing activity is apparent, or has received notification of claimed infringement meeting a list of requirements outlining the elements should be included in a notification (17 U.S.C § 512(c)(3)).

P10 claimed that CCBill and CWIE unreasonably implemented their repeat infringer policies by tolerating flagrant and blatant copyright infringement by its users despite notice of infringement from P10, notice of infringement from other copyright holders (not a party in this case) and "red flags" of copyright infringement.

===== Notification requirements =====
The district court found that P10 did not provide notice that substantially complied with the notification requirements. Although P10 claimed that it met the requirements through a combination of sets of documents that it sent to CCBill and CWIE on three different occasions, both the district court and the Ninth Circuit found that service providers could not be expected to piece together information from separate notices. The DMCA specifically indicates that the burden of policing copyright infringement should be placed on the owners of the copyright. Both courts held that knowledge of infringement could not be imputed to CCBill or CWIE. P10's claim that CCBill and CWIE failed to reasonably implement a repeat infringer policy was also not tenable.

===== Red flag test =====
A service provider may lose immunity if it fails to take action when it is aware of the infringing activity because the activity is apparent (§ 512(c)(1)(A)(ii)).

Perfect 10 alleged that CCBill and CWIE were aware of a number of "red flags" that signaled apparent infringement, claiming CWIE and CCBill provided services to websites with names (like illegal.net and stolencelebritypics.com) or disclaimers that suggest apparent infringement. In addition, CWIE also possibly committed contributory infringement by hosting password-hacking websites. In contrary, the court found neither the names nor the disclaimers clearly flagged apparent infringing activity. The court argued that there might be reasons other than announcing the infringement in choosing those names (for example, being appealing to a certain group of audience), and the disclaimer in question (illegal.net) did not make infringement apparent. In terms of the password-hacking websites, the court decided that the sites themselves did not present apparent infringement without further investigation, and service providers should not be imposed with the responsibility to determine whether the passwords enable infringement.

==== Remanded issues ====
The Ninth Circuit disagreed with the district court in declining to consider evidence of notices and "red flags" raised by third parties other than P10. The Ninth Circuit found they are relevant and remanded to the district court the determination of whether CCBill and/or CWIE responded to notices appropriately and implemented its repeat infringer policy in an unreasonable manner in other cases.

=== Standard technical measures ===
P10 argued that CCBill interfered with "standard technical measures" by blocking P10's access to CCBill affiliated websites to prevent P10 from discovering copyright infringement. P10 claimed that CCBill does not qualify for the safe harbor protection because the law states a service provider that interferes with "standard technical measures" that are used to identify or protect copyrighted works is not entitled to the safe harbor (§ 512(i)(1)(B)).

CCBill explained that the charge card employed by P10 for the purposes of establishing access to the affiliated web sites had been declined as a matter of policy—not because the pending membership was suspected of being established for the purposes of investigation, but because the credit card account had been implicated in previous chargebacks. According to the defendants, P10's method of identifying infringement involved reversing previous charges for subscriptions, which imposed a substantial cost for CCBill.

The Ninth Circuit was unable to determine whether membership is a standard technical measure, and remanded to the district court for a determination of these claims.

=== Transitory digital network communications: § 512(a) ===
Section 512(a) provides safe harbor for service providers who offer "the transmission, routing, or providing of connections for digital online communications, between or among points specified by a user, of material of the user's choosing, without modification to the content of the material as sent or received." The court agrees that the credit card information and proof of payment transmitted by CCBill are "digital online communications." However, the court could not conclude whether CCBill is a service provider under § 512(a), due to the lack of knowledge on how CCBill sends the payment it receives to its account holders. The Ninth Circuit therefore remanded to the district court for further consideration on this issue.

=== Information location tools: § 512(d) ===
Section 512(d) provides service providers protection against copyright infringement by reason of referring or linking users to an online location containing infringing material or infringing activity by using information location tools, including hypertext link. CCBill argued that it fell under this safe harbor because it displays a hyperlink to provide access to the user to access the client website at the end of the consumer transaction. The court disagreed with the claim by pointing out the majority of CCBill's functions are outside providing information location services. In addition, P10 did not claim that CCBill infringed its copyrights by providing a hyperlink; rather, the alleged infringement was through other services provided by CCBill. Therefore, CCBill should not qualify for the § 512(d) safe harbor.

=== Information residing on systems or networks at the direction of users: § 512(c) ===
The court disagreed with P10 and its claim about CWIE receiving direct financial benefit from the infringing activity. The fact that CWIE hosted sites for a fee unrelated to the amount of infringing material, and P10 failed to provide sound evidence about such benefit, which led the court to decide CWIE did meet the requirements of § 512(c), which limits liability for claims of infringement for storage at the direction of a user of material that resides on a system or network controlled or operated by or for the service provider. The court finds that CWIE is entitled to safe harbor under § 512(c) if the district court determines CWIE meets the threshold requirements stated in § 512(i).

== Communications Decency Act (CDA) ==
CDA gives federal immunity to the providers of interactive computer services and prevents them from being treated as the publishers or speakers of any information provided by another information content providers (§§ 230(c)). However, CDA does not protect against violations of "intellectual property," and the court held that the term means only federal intellectual property, not state regimes, in this case, like right of publicity. The court argued that, otherwise, this protection would have to vary from state to state, and national providers would have trouble determining the appropriate interventions required in different circumstance. In this case, the court found CCBill and CWIE are eligible for CDA immunity for all the claims raised by P10.

== Direct copyright infringement ==
P10 alleged that CCBill and CWIE directly infringed its copyright through its website, hornybees.com. hornybees.com has posted pictures of a P10 model's body without P10's authorization with the head of a celebrity. However, it was unclear about the relationship between CCBill/CWIE and the site. CWIE stated that the site is operated by CCBucks, and CCBill and CWIE have no interest in hornybees.com. However, some evidence has implied that the two companies might be involved more deeply. The Ninth Circuit remanded the issue for determination by the district count.

== See also ==
- Digital Millennium Copyright Act
- Online Copyright Infringement Liability Limitation Act
- List of leading legal cases in copyright law
- Wolk v. Kodak Imaging Network Inc.
