= Classroom of the Elite season 2 =

2022 Japanese anime series

Classroom of the Elite
- Season 2
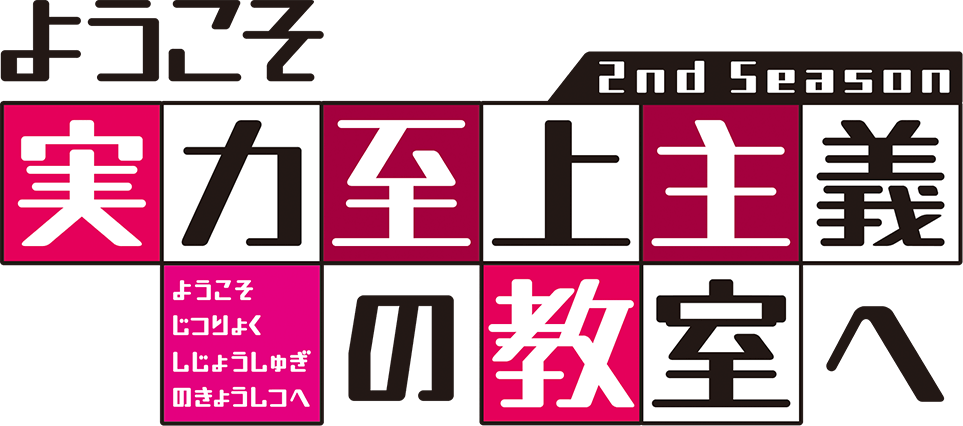
- Logo of the second season
- No. of episodes: 13

Release
- Original network: AT-X
- Original release: July 4 – September 26, 2022

Season chronology
- ← Previous; Season 1 Next → Season 3

Classroom of the Elite is an anime television series based on the light novels of the same name written by Shōgo Kinugasa and illustrated by Shunsaku Tomose. The second season was announced on February 21, 2022, with Lerche returning to animate the series. The season is directed by Yoshihito Nishōji, with Kishi and Hashimoto returning as chief directors, Hayato Kazano replacing Akashiro as the screenwriter, and Morita as the character designer. Masaru Yokoyama and Kana Hashiguchi are composing the music, replacing Takahashi. The opening theme song is "Dance in the Game," performed by ZAQ, while the ending theme song is "Hito Shibai" (人芝居), performed by Mai Fuchigami. The season aired from July 4 to September 26, 2022.

== Episodes ==
No. overall	No. in season	Title (Note: All English titles are taken from Crunchyroll.) (Note: The episode titles are taken from literature by various European (with one exception) philosophers.)	Directed by	Written by	Storyboarded by	Original release date
13	1	"Remember to Keep a Clear Head in Difficult Times." (Note: "Acquam memento rebus in arduis servare mentem." — Horace, Odes III); Transliteration: "Kon'nan no Naka de Koso, Heiseina Kokoro o Tamotaneba Naranai." (Japanese: 困難の中でこそ、平静な心を保たねばならない。)	Masaru Kanamori & Sō Kendai	Hayato Kazano	Yoshihito Nishōji &Seiji Kishi	July 4, 2022
Akane Tachibana reports the first year's first Special Test results to Manabu. Back on the cruise, Yosuke Hirata mentions Ayanokōji about Karuizawa. The first years are informed of a second Special Test: each student can meet at a rendezvous point at a certain time. Ayanokōji accompanies Karuizawa, Hideo Sotomura, and Teruhiko Yukimura. There, an instructor explains the Special Test. The students are split into eight groups of 14, with three students from Classes A and B, and four from Classes C and D, and each group under the name of a planet. The test is three days long, and at 8:00 am on the first day, the school declares a member of the group a "VIP", and the group discusses who the VIP is twice a day. After 30 minutes of the final day, everyone but the VIP sends a guess to the school. There are four cases of the test. Case 1: if everyone but the VIP's classmates sends the correct answer, each student will receive 500,000 private points and the VIP an extra 500,000. Case 2: if at least one person excluding the VIP's classmates sends a wrong answer, the VIP receives 500,000 private points. The remaining two cases apply if the VIP is exposed before the end of the test. Case 3: if a student sends the correct answer, they will receive 500,000 private points, their class will earn 50 class points, and the testing period will end for the group. If the VIP's classmate sends the correct answer, it will be deemed invalid, and the test will continue. Case 4: if a student sends a wrong answer, their class will lose 50 class points, the VIP will receive 500,000 private points, and their class will receive 50 class points, and the testing period will end. Additionally, if the VIP's classmate sends a wrong answer, it will be deemed invalid and the test will continue. On the day of the exam, neither Ayanokōji and Suzune are VIPs. They discuss the formalities of the test, when Ryūen inquires Suzune if she is a VIP and has the outcome of the first test. She denies both claims, and Ryūen threatens Class-D. At the first discussion, the Mars group does introductions. Afterwards, Ichinose suggests going for Case 1, and while everyone agrees, Koji Machida and his Class-A classmates abstain from all discussions. Machida explains that those will lead to a student identifying the VIP and betraying everyone, thus resulting in Case 3. Ichinose rebuttals that Machida's approach ruins a student's chance for redemption and notes that Case 1 allows classes of an equal number of students to receive an extra 500,000 private points. After the discussion, Shiho Manabe and the Class-C girls from the Mars group approach Karuizawa, claiming she has bullied Rika, but Machida comes to her aid. During the second discussion, the group is at a deadlock, and Ichinose suggests just chatting and going with the flow for now. At the end of the first day, Karuizawa breaks down.
14	2	"There Are Two Main Human Sins from Which All the Others Derive: Impatience and Indolence." (Note: "Es gibt zwei menschliche Hauptsünden, aus welchen sich alle andern ableiten: Ungeduld und Lassigkeit." — Franz Kafka, Die Zürauer Aphorismen); Transliteration: "Arayuru Tsumi no Minamoto Taru, Futatsu no Taizai ga Aru. Aseri to Taida da." (Japanese: あらゆる罪の源たる、ふたつの大罪がある。焦りと怠惰だ。)	Kentarō Iino	Hayato Kazano	Takahiro Tanaka	July 11, 2022
Hirata receives information from someone about Kushida being a VIP, which he tells to Yukimura and Ayanokōji. Rokusuke Kōenji presumably discovers the true VIP, and as a result, the Jupiter group's test has ended. Suzune becomes upset at Kōenji. She and Ayanokōji decide to unite Class-D to get the most class points. To do that, they decide to use Karuizawa as a primary player since she has a powerful presence amongst the Class-D girls. Ayanokōji notes that Karuizawa has been passive compared to her arrogant attitude. Ryūen declares his intent to win the test. He convinced his classmates to give in their phones, so he can receive the results. He left after proposing that Classes B, C, and D should unite to take down Class-A, which Suzune refused. Elsewhere, Karuizawa recovers from her breakdown and refers to herself a "parasite" as she is codependent on others. Ayanokōji and Kushida find each other, and she leaves after abashedly hugging him. Chie Hoshinomiya, the Class-B teacher, asks Chabashira how Ayanokōji became the leader as the island test ended, but Chabashira does not reply. Ayanokōji watches as Karuizawa begs Hirata about Manabe, to which he agrees but states that he and Karuizawa are not dating. She dumps him after he suggests that she must apologize to the girls. Ayanokōji deduces Karuizawa, and Hirata says that she agreed to protect her, given that she was severely bullied. Before the third discussion, Karuizawa asks Ayanokōji if he is the VIP. After both discussions, the Mars group is still at a deadlock, but Ayanokōji and Yukimura notice that the girls are following Karuizawa. After the fourth discussion, they follow her, and the boys trail behind them unnoticed. The girls confront Karuizawa and she implies about Rika. Upon hearing that, Ayanokōji and Yukimura hide in the hallway, and watch the girls insulting Karuizawa.
15	3	"The Greatest Souls Are Capable of the Greatest Vices as Well as of the Greatest Virtues." (Note: "Les plus grandes âmes sont capables des plus grands vices aussi bien que des plus grandes vertus." — René Descartes, Discours de la Méthode); Transliteration: "Saikō no Tamashī wa, Kono Uenai Akutoku to Kyokugen no Bitoku o Hakki Dekiru." (Japanese: 最高の魂は、この上ない悪徳と極限の美徳を発揮できる。)	Takahiro Tanaka	Kō Shigenobu	Shinichiro Kimura & Takahiro Tanaka	July 18, 2022
Yukimura and Ayanokōji finally intervene in the situation, but Karuizawa chides them. On the third day, the Venus group's test has concluded, thinking that Class-C is trying to exploit the test, Ayanokōji sends an email to Manabe. Karuizawa is lured to a secluded part of the ship, when Rika and the girls arrive. Manabe infers that Karuizawa was bullied before, confirmed when she had a panic attack. Manabe has Rika slap Karuizawa, while Ayanokōji watches revealing that his email to Manabe for Karuizawa. After the girls leave, Ayanokōji approaches Karuizawa and berates her. She talks about the experience of abuse. Ayanokōji finds a wound on her chest, upon seeing that he vows to protect her in exchange for working with him to unite Class-D and win the test. Afterwards, Ayanokōji accompanies Chabashira and spends points while shopping. Before the final discussion, Ichinose and Ayanokōji talk about Class-A, despite being in different classes, but affirms that it is possible to reach Class-A with 20,000,000 private points. Ayanokōji admits that he saw her allocated points from before. During the final discussion, Tetsuya Hamaguchi from Class-B proposes that everyone show their assignations to reach Case 1. Even with the risk of someone exposing the VIP first, everyone complies one by one until Yukimura hesitates to show the email, shocking everyone when he reveals that he is the VIP and implores everyone to protect him until the end of the test. Ayanokōji created a ploy by trading his and Yukimura's cellphones, meaning Ayanokōji is the VIP, but Ichinose exposed it after calling the former's phone. Karuizawa and Ayanokōji talk about the real ploy: after deducing that she is the VIP, he proposes that not only they had switch phones, but SIM Cards which he went to Chabashira. Ayanokōji trades Karuizawa's phone with Yukimura's. Ichinose reveals that she knew about the plan, but she does not expose it due to their alliance with Class-D. Class-C wins the test. Ryūen explains that Kushida was one of the VIPs.
16	4	"The Material Has to Be Created." (Note: Quoted from Florence Nightingale, Subsidiary Notes as to the Introduction of Female Nursing into Military Hospitals in Peace and War); Transliteration: "Jinzai wa Tsukuridasu Hitsuyō ga Aru." (Japanese: 人材は作り出す必要がある。)	Yūsuke Kamata	Hayato Kazano	Yūsuke Kamata	July 25, 2022
The VIPs were chosen based on their name's position in the Hiragana scripture and the corresponding planet group of said VIP. Class-D talks about how Class-C is not fully united. The school will hold a 13-event Sports Festival with the theme of Team Red vs Team White: Team Red consists of Classes A and D, and Team White consists of Classes B and C. The Sports Festival has several merits (the top three placements have a choice between 1,000 private points or bonuses on their written exam) and demerits (the bottom ten placements lose bonuses on their written exam), and classes can decide participants for the events. Ayanokōji and Suzune discuss that strict preparation separates the Sports Festival from the previous two special tests. She wants to win by unfair methods, but he believes they can win by normal ones. Later, the class decides on choosing participants through skill or volunteering. Suzune suggests that they should pair any students to win the events, at the risk of the weaker ones losing out on merits. Karuizawa disagrees with Suzune. She refutes that personal choice for events is better and notes that she looks down on everyone and cannot unite the class with that attitude. Karuizawa accompanies Kushida, who suggests to combine the ideas, and the class agrees. Karuizawa and a few students are against Suzune's view, and she gains the ire by calling them incompetent. Hirata reconciles by getting the votes on the idea, and the majority chose Suzune. Later, Karuizawa and Ayanokōji discuss how he ordered her to refute Suzune's idea, and get Kushida's opinion. Ayanokōji predicts that there is a traitor amongst Class-D, and interrupts the conversation when Karuizawa demands more. The class extensively trains for the Festival. When Suzune argues with a student, Ayanokōji wonders why she cannot compromise. She believes that weaker people are to match the stronger people's rhythm to win. After a three-legged race, he surmises that she ignores her allies. Ayanokōji proposes with Suzune and Kushida to surveil Team White, believing Kushida has sold the VIP information.
17	5	"Every Failure Is a Step to Success." (Note: Quoted from William Whewell, Lectures on the History of Moral Philosophy in England); Transliteration: "Subete no Shippai wa Seikō e no Katei ni Suginai." (Japanese: すべての失敗は成功への過程に過ぎない。)	Tarō Kubo & Hideki Takayama	Kō Shigenobu	Hiroshi Matsuzono	August 1, 2022
Ayanokōji and Suzune speculate that Kushida is betraying the class, because she receives private points from other classes. They surveil Team White, much to Kushida's chagrin over Suzune. She blatantly asks if she did sell her VIP information, to which she denies and asks to trust her. The Sports Festival begins. Sudo motivates Class-D, while Arisu of Class-A observes the Festival. When Kōenji leaves, Sudo lowers the class morale. Team Red loses the "Topple the Pole" event after Ryūen defeats Sudo. Things get worse when Suzune accidentally injures Saki Kinoshita. After failing to convince Kōenji to rejoin, Suzune wishes that she had Kushida and admits she liked her at some point. Team White continues targeting Sudo and Suzune, continuing to lower the Class-D morale. Karuizawa and Ayanokōji believe that the Class-D traitor leaked the participation list for Ryūen to target Sudo and Suzune. Ayanokōji continues that he never wanted the class to win the Festival and that doing nothing is optional. Sudo enters the school, drastically lowering class morale. Ayanokōji tells Suzune to be useful and convince Sudo to rejoin the team, just as she did to him. Karuizawa and Hirata ask Ayanokōji about the traitor, but he does not answer and bluffs that Suzune has submitted the leaked list. Kushida and Suzune head to the medical office, where Ryūen allegedly accuses Suzune for hurting Saki. Ryūen demands 1 million private points or he will tell the school of the incident. Suzune thinks it is a bluff, but Ryūen demands the points and for Suzune to submit to him, to which he will wait for her answer at the end of the festival. Visiting Manabu in the hallway, Suzune implores that she knows her incompetence and will not trouble him anymore. She affirms that she has one thing to do for the festival.
18	6	"Adversity Is the First Path to Truth." (Note: Quoted from Lord Byron, Don Juan); Transliteration: "Gyakkyō wa Shinjitsu e to Itaru Saisho no Michisuji de Aru." (Japanese: 逆境は真実へと至る最初の道筋である。)	Sō Kendai & Hayato Kazano	Hayato Kazano	Toshihiko Masuda & Seiji Kishi	August 8, 2022
When Suzune scolds Sudo, he admits that he joined the festival for attention and to get back at those talking bad about him. Suzune affirms that he must keep fighting, or he will be worthless and will await his return. Before the break ends, Ayanokōji confronts Kushida about her being the traitor. She initially denies the accusation but poses a notion as to why he did not change the list if he knew she leaked the participation list, which she deduces would have caused inter-class confusion. She finally reveals that she is the traitor for leaking the list, and selling her VIP information to Ryūen for her desire to see Suzune and Ayanokōji expelled. Suzune tries to convince Sudo one more time, talking about how they are the same in seeking acknowledgment from others. She talks about how she has always been seeking acknowledgment from Manabu, out casting herself from others to reach it, after going through her experiences with Class-D, she realizes that she cannot fight alone and needs allies, which Sudo gives in after being moved by her words. Sudo rejoins the festival and apologizes for his actions earlier. Suzune and a male student are replaced by Kushida and Ayanokōji for the final event. Manabu and Ayanokōji talk about the future of Class-D, and the latter indulges the former in a relay race to learn more about him. As Ayanokōji receives the baton, the two laps all the runners and run at dead heat, leaving the school in awe. At the end of the festival, Class-D ends up coming in last, but praises Ayanokōji for his performance. Suzune talks about how she has personally grown and affirms her belief in helping Class-D become strong. Suzune meets with Ryūen and Kushida to reveal the answer. Suzune confronts her about her being the traitor and remarks to drop the fake appearance. Kushida obliges and reveals her intention to expel Suzune by any means necessary and remove those who know her. Ryūen reveals that he had Kushida give the participation list, and instructed Saki to hurt Suzune and pretend to be injured. Suzune has been recording for her protection, to which Ryūen has been for his innocence should the matter reach the student council. Ryūen receives an email from an anonymous user, a recording voice about the evidence. He praises the "mastermind" of Suzune and Class-D for anticipation.
19	7	"To Doubt Everything or to Believe Everything Are Two Equally Convenient Solutions; Both Dispense with the Necessity of Reflection." (Note: "Douter de tout ou tout croire, ce sont deux solutions également commodes, qui l'une et l'autre nous dispensent de réfléchir." — Henri Poincaré, La Science et l'Hypothèse); Transliteration: "Subete o Utagau Koto mo Subete o Shinjiru Koto mo Tomoni Ani de, Shikō o Hōki Suru ni Hitoshii." (Japanese: すべてを疑うこともすべてを信じることも共に安易で、思考を放棄するに等しい。)	Yasunori Gotō	Kō Shigenobu	Tomohiro Matsukawa & Yūsuke Kamata	August 15, 2022
Manabu renounces from working with the student council, replaced by Miyabi Nagumo from Class 2-A. He plans to change the school into a meritocracy. After the assembly, Kohei Katsuragi from 1-A advises Ayanokōji, Suzune, and Class-D to be wary of Ryūen. After he leaves, Maya Sato from 1-D bashfully asks Ayanokōji to trade numbers and implies she has a crush on him. Despite Class-D coming last for the Festival, no students are expelled, much to Chabashira's surprise. She allows the class know about the next Special Test, which will serve as their final exam: Paper Shuffle. Two students will be paired up and must score above 60 points as a pair, even if X student scores 0 and Y student scores 60, or both students will be expelled. The pairs will be determined through a mini-test, and there is a threshold for the total points from all subjects. Each class will make questions for the exam, which will be answered by one of the other three classes. The class that made the questions can request other classes to do the test, and there will be a lottery in the event of a double request. The requestee and the requestor will go head-to-head, and whichever class scores higher will steal 50 class points from the other. Cheating will result in immediate expulsion. Suzune and Ayanokōji suggest preparing the class for Paper Shuffle. Karuizawa and Ayanokōji exchange emails about her witnessing Maya's confession. Karuizawa, Hirata, Sudo, Suzune, Ayanokōji, and Kushida prep for the exam. Ayanokōji and Suzune plan to rejoin the others as they leave to prep, as she prepares to tell him about her past. Suzune explains that she and Kushida attended the single school. Sometime before graduation, an incident imploded a class and rumor had it that a single female student was the catalyst, whom Suzune believes is Kushida. Ayanokōji suggests she gets Kushida expelled, but Suzune believes she can make Kushida their ally. Meanwhile, Ryūen identifies Manabe as the mastermind of Class-D. Ryūen hypothesizes that the mastermind is either Ayanokōji or Yukimura, based on their witnesses to Manabe and Karuizawa. Ayanokōji and Suzune rejoin the others to devise a plan and have some students flunk the mini-test, so the highest scorers can pair with the lowest one to create an average threshold. That night, Karuizawa and Ayanokōji have a conversation about Sato, and he vows to protect Karuizawa. The next day, the class agreed to Suzune for the mini-test. Ayanokōji accompanies Sato for the Paper Shuffle.
20	8	"The Wound Is at Her Heart." (Note: "Tacitum vivit sub pectore vulnus." — Virgil, Aeneis); Transliteration: "Mune no Soko de, Kizu wa Shizuka ni Ikite Iru." (Japanese: 胸の底で、傷は静かに生きている。)	Masaru Kanamori	Hayato Kazano	Hiroshi Matsuzono	August 22, 2022
Kushida reminisces her thoughts on the aftermath of the class implosion. Class-D will have study sessions for Paper Shuffle, with her and Suzune as overseers. Kushida leaves the class as she receives an email. Yukimura offers to oversee a pair for Paper Shuffle. Akito Miyake and Haruka Hasebe, noting that unity and cooperation are necessary to win. Suzune asks Ayanokōji to join Yukimura's group and track progress. At the study session, the students encourage Ayanokōji not to hold back, given his performance at the festival. He advises preparing for any dirty tricks the classes make for the exam, noting that the school might have a system to mediate questions. That same day, Ayanokōji relays that information to Suzune as the two discuss keeping an eye on Kushida by inviting him to oversee the group. Ayanokōji receives an email from Ryūen asking who is the mastermind of Class-D. The other students tease Sato and Ayanokōji. Suzune meets with Kushida alone. They make a bet for the math exam of Paper Shuffle: Kushida will respect Suzune if she scores higher, or Suzune will get expelled if Kushida wins. To acknowledge it as a real bet, Suzune gets Manabu to witness the agreement. After he leaves, Kushida senses that Ayanokōji is on a call with Suzune and asks him to meet with her. At the meetup, Kushida adds another condition that if she wins, Ayanokōji will get expelled, to which he agrees. He wants to know about Kushida's past to see why she is the way she is and get the whole picture and she complies. As a child, Kushida was praised for being a top achiever, and she craved praise and attention, which eventually stopped. She decided to become the nicest, friendliest, and caring person, so the others could rely on and trust her. This eventually took a toll on her mentally, despite continuing to put up a front. To combat her distress, she created a personal blog wherein she gossiped about her classmates. The next day, her classmates found her blog and shunned her, tired of keeping up a front, she revealed every secret for all classmates, which eventually turned them against themselves and imploded. She implies that she knows truths about some Class-D students, vital enough to ruin them. Getting praised and knowing the dirty truths about people thrills her enough to think about taking drastic measures: a monster created from the desire for recognition. She finishes her tirade by reminding Ayanokōji and Suzune about the conditions of the bet.
21	9	"If You Make a Mistake and Do Not Correct It, This Is Called a Mistake." (Note: "Guò ér bù gǎi, shì wèiguò yǐ" — Confucius, Lúnyǔ); Transliteration: "Ayamachi o Okashi Nagara, Sore o Aratamenai Koto o Koso, Shin no Ayamachi Toiu." (Japanese: 過ちを犯しながら、それを改めないことをこそ、真の過ちという。)	Yōhei Fukui & Takahiro Tanaka	Kō Shigenobu	Masaki Kitamura & Daisei Fukuoka	August 29, 2022
Kushida informs Ryūen of her bet with Ayanokōji and Suzune in exchange for their expulsion. Kushida will let Class-C win Paper Shuffle. Later, Ryūen intrudes on the study session and vaguely asks about the email to fish out the Class-D mastermind. A Class-C student, Hiyori Shiina, notes that Ayanokōji and Yukimura have forgettable faces. Thus, she is not sure if they are the mastermind. Feeling comfortable with the study group, Haruka decides to make a friend group where they share their names with Akito, Ayanokōji, and Yukimura, who asks to be called Keisei. Sakura joins the group as well, dubbed the "Ayanokoji Group". That night, Ayanokōji invites Karuizawa to play an important part of Paper Shuffle. She sends a birthday wish to him. The next day, Suzune tracks the progress of everyone's study group. Kushida reminds them to try their hardest, which Karuizawa received. She calls Kushida for trying to motivate everyone and not caring when someone fails. Karuizawa accidentally splashes a drink on her, but apologizes for the incident by offering her uniform. Sometime later, Kushida volunteers to submit the test questions and asks Chabashira to discard any other copies from Class-D. Kushida gives the questions to Ryūen as per their deal. The test day comes. Hirata is happy that Karuizawa is with Ayanokōji and would be even happier if they date. During the math test, Kushida is shocked to see the questions. After the test, she chides Ryūen for what happened, who lets her know that Suzune saw through it all. Suzune asked Chabashira to accept her and the copy of the questions, and discard other ones. Kushida finds a cheat sheet on her uniform, knowing Ryūen handed his class copy to the Class-D mastermind, betraying Kushida. She begrudgingly agrees to fulfill her side of the bet, but declares that she will sabotage Ayanokōji. Ryūen would either give Class-D his class copy or change Kushida's questions, to which he chose the latter. Ryūen plans to keep Karuizawa away from Ayanokōji.
22	10	"People, Often Deceived by An Illusive Good, Desire Their Own Ruin." (Note: "Il popolo molte volte desidera la rovina sua, ingannato da una falsa specie di bene." — Niccolò Machiavelli, Discorsi sopra la prima deca di Tito Livio); Transliteration: "Hitobito wa Tsuneni Sono Hametsu o Negatte Iru. Itsuwari no Zen ni Azamukareru ga Yue ni." (Japanese: 人々は常にその破滅を願っている。偽りの善に欺かれるがゆえに。)	Yūsuke Kamata	Kō Shigenobu	Masaki Kitamura, Hito Tadano, Yama Mamimu, Miki Sorakubo & Mai Sakamoto	September 5, 2022
Every student passed Paper Shuffle. While witnessing Ichinose and Arisu hanging out, the Ayanokōji group notes that everything about Ichinose is perfect, which they find unsettling to defeat Class-C for her. A Class-C student follows Karuizawa around. That night, Karuizawa lets Ayanokōji know of the incident and that the Class-A student was spying on their study sessions. The next day, all Class-D students are being provoked by Class-C. Suzune notes that Ryūen is doing this to exploit the mastermind, and that he is selling into her and being the mastermind. While returning Suzune's book to the library, Ayanokōji talks to Hiyori, despite being in rival classes. Afterwards, Ayanokōji meets his father at the reception room, whom he has not seen in a year and a half. He tells him that the butler has killed himself after helping Ayanokōji apply for the school. Ayanokōji left his family to take a better independent path, despite his father's warning. He forces his son to sign the school withdrawal form and rejoin the White Room. However, Mr. Sakayanagi, the school chairman and Arisu's father, arrives in time to prevent the abuse, allowing Ayanokōji to stay at school. After the meeting, Ayanokōji confronts Chabashira about the reason to reach Class-A. Ayanokōji apologizes to Karuizawa for using her and that he will stop his desire from leaving Class-D, as he will leave that to Suzune and Hirata. Ayanokōji ends the conversation with Karuizawa.
23	11	"A Man Who Cannot Command Himself Will Always Be a Slave." (Note: "Wer sich nicht selbst befiehlt, bleibt immer Knecht." — Johann Wolfgang von Goethe, Zahme Xenien); Transliteration: "Jibun Jishin o Gyosenai Mono wa, Itsumade mo Dorei no Mamada." (Japanese: 自分自身を御せない者は、いつまでも奴隷のままだ。)	Takahiro Tanaka, Ippei Ichii & Masaru Kanamori	Hayato Kazano	Masaki Kitamura, Yama Mamimu & Hito Tadano	September 12, 2022
Karuizawa recounts the conversation from the night before. Ryūen intrudes on Class-D. Kōenji leaves class, with Ryūen and his men giving chase, making Class-D concerned. In the courtyard, Kōenji is confronted by Class-C students as Ryūen starts instigating by breaking Kōenji's property. Arisu and Class-A students arrive to witness the altercation. Kōenji infers that Ryūen is seeking the Class-D mastermind, and defuses the situation by claiming that he has no interest in the inter-class war and he will do anything. Ryūen subsides his aggravation, but Arisu gaslights him by teasing him, upon which, Ryūen goes to kick her, but Hashimoto defends her. As everyone leaves, Ryūen tells the Class-D students about the mastermind. When Ryūen, Mio, Ishizaki, and Albert lure Karuizawa to the construction site, they force her to reveal the identity of the mastermind, with Ryūen pouring water on her.
24	12	"Force Without Wisdom Falls of Its Own Weight." (Note: "Vis consilii expers mole ruit sua." — Horace, Odes III); Transliteration: "Shiryo naki Chikara wa Mizukara no Shitsuryō ni Yotte Kuzuresaru." (Japanese: 思慮なき力は自らの質量によって崩れ去る。)	Yūsuke Kamata, Masaru Kanamori, Masaki Kitamura, Kanae Komoda & Shin'ichirō Kitamura	Kō Shigenobu	Masaki Kitamura & Takehiko Matsumoto	September 19, 2022
When Karuizawa hides the truth from Ryūen, Ayanokōji asks Chabashira and Manabu for help. Ayanokōji arrives at the site, reveals himself as the mastermind, and allegedly overwhelms and defeats Ryūen's group. Karuizawa reconciles with Ayanokōji.
25	13	"The Worst Enemy You Can Meet Will Always Be Yourself." (Note: "Der schlimmste Feind, dem du begegnen kannst, wirst du immer dir selber sein." — Friedrich Nietzsche, Also sprach Zarathustra: Ein Buch für Alle und Keinen); Transliteration: "Anata ga Deau Saiaku no Teki wa, Tsuneni Anata Jishin da." (Japanese: あなたが出会う最悪の敵は、常にあなた自身だ。)	Hiroyuki Hashimoto	Hayato Kazano	Daisei Fukuoka & Hiroyuki Hashimoto	September 26, 2022
Ryūen decides to respect anyone at school. Suzune is consulted by Manabu about the council. Ayanokōji tells Ryūen that he will continue to observe Class-D's process to ascension. He reveals his prediction of Class-D reaching Class-C and getting demoted due to his intention to expel Kushida the following term. On Christmas day, Ayanokōji, Sato, Karuizawa, and Hirata, go on a double date. After this, Ayanokōji lacks romantic feelings for anyone and breaks up with Sato. Ayanokōji receives a gift from Karuizawa and she receives a cold medicine from him. As they leave, Ayanokōji meets up with Arisu.
