= Viacom International, Inc. v. YouTube, Inc. =

U.S. copyright court case

Viacom International Inc. v. YouTube, Inc.
- Court: United States Court of Appeals for the Second Circuit
- Full case name: Viacom International Inc. v. YouTube, Inc.
- Argued: October 18, 2011
- Decided: April 5, 2012

Case history
- Appealed from: United States District Court for the Southern District of New York

Holding
- The Digital Millennium Copyright Act's "safe harbor" provisions shield an online platform from liability for the copyright infringement of users.

Court membership
- Judges sitting: José A. Cabranes, Debra Ann Livingston (Note: Judge Roger Miner was also part of the appellate panel that heard the case, but he died before the decision was issued.)

Case opinions
- Decision by: José A. Cabranes

Keywords
- Copyright, Digital Millennium Copyright Act, Safe Harbor

Viacom International, Inc. v. YouTube, Inc., 676 F.3d 19 (2nd Cir., 2012), was a United States Court of Appeals for the Second Circuit decision regarding liability for copyright infringement committed by the users of an online video hosting platform.

In 2007, the entertainment company Viacom sued YouTube, the video-sharing site owned by Google, alleging that YouTube had engaged in "brazen" and "massive" copyright infringement by allowing users to upload and view hundreds of thousands of videos owned by Viacom without permission. Google was brought into the litigation as YouTube's corporate owner. Google responded that the safe harbor provision of the Digital Millennium Copyright Act shielded the company from liability for the infringing behavior of its users. After an initial victory for YouTube at the district court level and then a reversal at the circuit court level, the parties settled out of court in 2014.

== Background ==
In March 2007, Viacom filed a US $1 billion lawsuit against Google and YouTube alleging that the site had engaged in "brazen" copyright infringement by allowing users to upload and view copyrighted material owned by Viacom. The complaint stated that over 150,000 unauthorized clips of Viacom's programming, including episodes of many popular television shows, had been made available on YouTube, and that these clips had collectively been viewed 1.5 billion times.

Viacom claimed that YouTube had infringed on its copyrights by performing (via Internet transmission), displaying, and reproducing Viacom's copyrighted works. Furthermore, the complaint contended that the defendants "engage in, promote and induce" the infringement, and that they had deliberately built up a library of infringing works in order to increase the site's traffic and advertising revenue. In total, Viacom claimed direct infringement and indirect infringement, specifically inducement, contributory infringement and vicarious infringement.

Viacom did not seek damages for any actions after Google put its Content ID filtering system in place in early 2008, and instead pursued declaratory relief on the ability of American copyright law to address Internet-enabled infringement. The lawsuit was later merged with similar complaints being pursued by other copyright holders.

== District court proceedings ==
The case was first heard at the District Court for the Southern District of New York in 2008. During the pre-trial discovery phase, Viacom requested and received a court order for YouTube to hand over data detailing the viewing selections of every user who had ever watched videos on the site. This move led to concerns that the selections of individual users could be identified through a combination of their IP addresses and usernames. The court's decision to grant this request was criticized by the Electronic Frontier Foundation, which called the order "a setback to privacy rights", and privacy advocates such as Simon Davies, who stated that the privacy of millions of YouTube users was threatened.

Judge Louis Stanton dismissed the privacy concerns as "speculative", and ordered YouTube to hand over documents totaling about 12 terabytes of data. On the other hand, Stanton rejected Viacom's request that YouTube hand over the source code of its search engine, saying that it was a trade secret. As a result of the data handover, many users began posting videos under the group name "Viacom Sucks!", often containing large amounts of profanity. However, Google and Viacom agreed that Google could anonymize all the data before giving it to Viacom. The privacy deal also applied to other litigants including the English Premier League, the Rodgers and Hammerstein organization, and the Scottish Premier League.

Meanwhile, the deal exempted employees of both the defendants and the plaintiffs, whose de-anonymized data was provided separately. The employee data was later used in filings by both sides, because in some cases employees of the entertainment firms had uploaded their companies' content to YouTube voluntarily. Viacom cited internal e-mails sent among YouTube's founders discussing how to deal with clips uploaded to YouTube that were obviously the property of major media conglomerates. Google stated that Viacom itself had "hired no fewer than 18 different marketing agencies to upload its content to the site". Google argued that since Viacom and its lawyers were "unable to recognize that dozens of the clips alleged as infringements in this case were uploaded to YouTube" with Viacom's express authorization, "it was unreasonable to expect Google's employees to know which videos were uploaded without permission."

In 2010 Judge Stanton ruled that Google was protected by provisions of the Digital Millennium Copyright Act (DMCA), notwithstanding evidence of intentional uploads of copyrighted content by the entertainment companies themselves. Stanton held that while YouTube undeniably had general knowledge that some copyrighted material had been uploaded by users, it did not know which clips had been uploaded with permission and which had not. He said that mandating video-sharing sites to proactively police every uploaded video "would contravene the structure and operation of the D.M.C.A." Stanton also noted that YouTube had successfully enacted a mass take-down notice issued by Viacom in 2007, indicating that this was a viable process for addressing infringement claims. And finally, Stanton rejected Viacom's comparisons between YouTube and other Internet-based, media-sharing companies, such as Grokster, that had previously been found guilty of contributory copyright infringement.

== Circuit court ruling ==
Viacom appealed its loss to the United States Court of Appeals for the Second Circuit, and the circuit court's decision was issued in 2012. During these proceedings, Viacom and the other plaintiffs focused on internal e-mails among YouTube employees who were aware of widespread infringement by the platform's users, including specific instances that the district court had said could be considered knowledge that would disqualify YouTube from safe harbor protection.

Circuit court judges José A. Cabranes and Debra Ann Livingston reversed the district court's ruling, holding that "a reasonable jury could find that YouTube had actual knowledge or awareness of specific infringing activity on its website", while the ability to control infringing activity need not require knowledge of specific infringements. Thus, the case was again eligible for a jury trial at the district court level, in which YouTube would have to defend itself against the copyright infringement claims. Furthermore, the circuit court found flaws in the district court's opinion on whether YouTube qualified for the safe harbor protections of the DMCA, with some definitional matters concerning the term "syndication" under the statute remaining unsettled. Thus, the case was remanded to the district court for further fact-finding on these matters.

== Subsequent developments ==
A new hearing on the dispute was heard in 2013 at the District Court for the Southern District of New York, again with Judge Louis Stanton presiding. After additional discussion on the ability of YouTube to control infringing activity by its users and the applicability of safe harbor protections under the Digital Millennium Copyright Act (as instructed by the circuit court), Stanton again ruled in favor of YouTube and Google.

Stanton ruled that YouTube had no actual knowledge of any specific instance of infringement of Viacom's works, and therefore could not have "willfully blinded itself" to the infringement. He also ruled that YouTube did not have the "right and ability to control" infringing activity because "there is no evidence that YouTube induced its users to submit infringing videos, provided users with detailed instructions about what content to upload or edited their content, prescreened submissions for quality, steered users to infringing videos, or otherwise interacted with infringing users to a point where it might be said to have participated in their activity."

Viacom initiated another appeal to the circuit court level, but they and Google announced in 2014 that they had reached an out-of-court settlement. No details on the nature of the settlement were revealed, except for the fact that no money changed hands.

== See also ==
- Google litigation
- Vidmeter
