= List of Classroom of the Elite episodes =

The English logo of the anime series

Classroom of the Elite is a Japanese anime television series based on the light novel of the same name, with illustrations by Shunsaku Tomose. An anime television series adaptation aired from July 12 to September 27, 2017, on AT-X and other networks. Seiji Kishi and Hiroyuki Hashimoto directed the series at Lerche, Aoi Akashiro handled the series composition, Kazuaki Morita designed the characters, and Ryo Takahashi composed the music. The opening theme song is "Caste Room", performed by ZAQ, while the ending theme song is "Beautiful Soldier", performed by Minami. Crunchyroll streamed the series and Funimation streamed the English dub. iQIYI added the series onto its platform, Q3, and the Thai dub in 2022.

On February 21, 2022, it was announced that a sequel was in production, which was later revealed to have two seasons, with Lerche returning as the studio. The second season is directed by Yoshihito Nishōji, with Kishi and Hashimoto serving as chief directors, Hayato Kazano replacing Akashiro as screenwriter, and Morita returning as character designer. Masaru Yokoyama and Kana Hashiguchi replaced Takahashi, and served as music composers. The second season aired from July 4 to September 26, 2022. The opening theme song is "Dance in the Game", performed by ZAQ, while the ending theme song is "Hito Shibai" (人芝居; lit. 'Human Drama'), performed by Mai Fuchigami. The third season was originally scheduled for 2023, but was delayed, and eventually aired from January 3 to March 27, 2024. The third season's opening theme song is "Minor Piece", performed by ZAQ, while the ending theme song is "Konsei Dai-Kakumei" (今世大革命; lit. 'The Great Revolution of this World'), performed by Yui Ninomiya.

A fourth season, covering the first semester of the Year 2 sequel light novel series, was announced during the "MF Bunko J Natsu no Gakuensai 2024" livestream event on September 1, 2024. It is produced by Lerche and directed by Noriyuki Nomata, with the rest of the staff and cast reprising their roles. The fourth season premiered on April 1, 2026. The fourth season's opening theme song is "Monster", performed by Eir Aoi, while the ending theme song is "Liar Veil" (ライアーヴェール), performed by ZAQ.

== Series overview ==
Season	Episodes	Originally released	
Season	Episodes	First released	Last released
1	12	July 12, 2017	September 27, 2017
2	13	July 4, 2022	September 26, 2022
3	13	January 3, 2024	March 27, 2024
4	16	April 1, 2026	June 24, 2026
5	TBA	2027	TBA

== Episodes ==
=== Season 1 (2017) ===
No. overall	No. in season	Title (Note: All English titles are taken from Crunchyroll.) (Note: The episode titles are taken from literature by various European philosophers.)	Directed by	Written by	Storyboarded by	Original release date	Ref.
1	1	"What is Evil? Whatever Springs from Weakness." (Note: "Was ist schlecht? - Alles, was aus der Schwäche stammt." — Friedrich Nietzsche, Der Antichrist); Transliteration: "Aku to wa Nani ka? Yowasa kara Shōzuru Subete no Mono da." (Japanese: 悪とは何か――弱さから生ずるすべてのものだ。)	Yū Kinome	Aoi Akashiro	Yusuke Kamata	July 12, 2017	
2	2	"It Takes a Great Talent and Skill to Conceal One's Talent and Skill." (Note: "C'est une grande habileté que de savoir cacher son habileté." — François de La Rochefoucauld, Maximes); Transliteration: "Sainō o Kakusu no ni mo Takuetsu Shita Sainō ga iru." (Japanese: 才能を隠すのにも卓越した才能がいる。)	Yoshinari Suzuki	Hayato Kazano	Noriaki Saito	July 19, 2017	
3	3	"Man is an Animal that makes Bargains: No Other Animal Does This, No Dog exchanges Bones with Another." (Note: Quoted from Adam Smith, The Wealth of Nations); Transliteration: "Ningen wa Torihiki o Suru Yuiitsu no Dōbutsu de Aru. Hone o Kōkan Suru Inu wa inai." (Japanese: 人間は取引をする唯一の動物である。骨を交換する犬はいない)	Yusuke Kamata	Ohine Ezaki	Yusuke Kamata	July 26, 2017	
4	4	"We Should not be Upset that Others Hide the Truth from Us When We Hide it from Ourselves." (Note: "Il ne faut pas s'offenser que les autres nous cachent la vérité, puisque nous nous la cachons si souvent à nous-mêmes" — François de La Rochefoucauld, Maximes); Transliteration: "Tanin ga Shinjitsu o Inpei suru Koto ni Taishite, Wareware wa Okoru Beki Denai. Nazenara, Wareware mo Jishin kara Shinjitsu o Inpei suru no de aru kara" (Japanese: 他人が真実を隠蔽することに対して、我々は怒るべきでない。なぜなら、我々も自身から真実を隠蔽するのであるから。)	Yōhei Fukui	Aoi Akashiro	Daisei Fukuoka	August 2, 2017	
5	5	"Hell is other People." (Note: "l'enfer, c'est les autres" — Jean-Paul Sartre, Huis-clos); Transliteration: "Jigoku, Sore wa Tanin de Aru" (Japanese: 地獄、それは他人である。)	Yoshifumi Sasahara	Hayato Kazano	Yoshifumi Sasahara	August 9, 2017	
6	6	"There are Two Kinds of Lies; One concerns an Accomplished Fact, the Other concerns a Future Duty." (Note: "Il y a deux sortes de mensonges: celui de fait qui regarde le passé, celui de droit qui regarde l'avenir." — Jean-Jacques Rousseau, Émile, ou De l'éducation); Transliteration: "Uso ni wa Nishurui Aru. Kako ni Kan Suru Jijitsujō no Uso to Mirai ni Kansuru Kenrijō no Uso de Aru." (Japanese: 嘘には二種類ある。過去に関する事実上の嘘と未来に関する権利上の嘘である。)	Fumio Itō	Ohine Ezaki	Yū Kinome	August 16, 2017	
7	7	"Nothing is as Dangerous as an Ignorant Friend; A Wise Enemy is to be Preferred." (Note: "Rien n'est si dangereux qu'un ignorant ami; Mieux vaudrait un sage ennemi." — Jean de La Fontaine, Fables); Transliteration: "Muchi na Yūjin hodo Kiken na Mono wa Nai. Kashikoi Teki no Hō ga Yoppodo Mashida." (Japanese: 無知な友人ほど危険なものはない。賢い敵のほうがよっぽどましだ。)	Yoshinari Suzuki	Aoi Akashiro	Yoshihito Nishōji	August 23, 2017	
8	8	"Abandon All Hope, Ye Who Enter Here." (Note: "Lasciate ogni speranza, voi ch'entrate" — Dante Alighieri, Divina Commedia); Transliteration: "Nanjira Koko ni Hair Mono, Issai no Nozomi o Suite yo." (Japanese: 汝等ここに入るもの、一切の望みを捨てよ。)	Yusuke Kamata	Ohine Ezaki	Akiyo Ohashi	August 30, 2017	
9	9	"Man is Condemned to be Free." (Note: "L'homme est condamné à être libre." — Jean-Paul Sartre, L'existentialisme est un humanisme); Transliteration: "Ningen wa Jiyū no Kei ni Shosa rete Iru." (Japanese: 人間は自由の刑に処されている。)	Yoshihide Yūzumi	Hayato Kazano	Yoshihide Yūzumi	September 6, 2017	
10	10	"Every Man has in Himself the Most Dangerous Traitor of All." (Note: "Den farligste Forræder blandt alle er den, ethvert Menneske har i sig selv." — Søren Kierkegaard, Kjerlighedens Gjerninger); Transliteration: "Uragirimono no Naka de Mottomo Kiken'naru Uragirimono wa Nanika to Ieba, Subete no Ningen ga Onore Jishin no Naibu ni Kaku Shite Iru Tokoro no Mono de Aru." (Japanese: 裏切者の中で最も危険なる裏切者は何かといえば、すべての人間が己れ自身の内部にかくしているところのものである。)	Yōhei Fukui	Ohine Ezaki	Yōhei Fukui	September 13, 2017	
11	11	"What People Commonly Call Fate is Mostly their Own Stupidity." (Note: "Was aber die Leute gemeiniglich das Schicksal nennen sind meistens nur ihre eigenen dummen Streiche." — Arthur Schopenhauer, Parerga und Paralipomena); Transliteration: "Shikashi Gaishite Hitobito ga Unmei to Yobu Mono wa, Taihan ga Jibun no Gukō ni Suginai." (Japanese: しかし概して人々が運命と呼ぶものは、大半が自分の愚行にすぎない。)	Takahiro Majima	Hayato Kazano	Akiyo Ohashi	September 20, 2017	
12	12	"Genius Lives Only One Story Above Madness." (Note: "Das Genie wohnt nur eine Etage höher als der Wahnsinn" — Arthur Schopenhauer, Parerga und Paralipomena); Transliteration: "Tensai to wa, Kyōki Yori mo 1-Kaisō-bun Dake ue ni Sunde Iru Mono no Koto de Aru." (Japanese: 天才とは、狂気よりも1階層分だけ上に住んでいる者のことである。)	Yoshinari Suzuki, Yoshihide Yūzumi, and Atsuko Tonomizu	Aoi Akashiro	Yoshihide Yūzumi & Daisei Fukuoka	September 27, 2017	

=== Season 2 (2022) ===
No. overall	No. in season	Title (Note: The episode titles are taken from literature by various European (with one exception) philosophers.)	Directed by	Written by	Storyboarded by	Original release date
13	1	"Remember to Keep a Clear Head in Difficult Times." (Note: "Acquam memento rebus in arduis servare mentem." — Horace, Odes III); Transliteration: "Kon'nan no Naka de Koso, Heiseina Kokoro o Tamotaneba Naranai." (Japanese: 困難の中でこそ、平静な心を保たねばならない。)	Masaru Kanamori & Sō Kendai	Hayato Kazano	Yoshihito Nishōji &Seiji Kishi	July 4, 2022
14	2	"There Are Two Main Human Sins from Which All the Others Derive: Impatience and Indolence." (Note: "Es gibt zwei menschliche Hauptsünden, aus welchen sich alle andern ableiten: Ungeduld und Lassigkeit." — Franz Kafka, Die Zürauer Aphorismen); Transliteration: "Arayuru Tsumi no Minamoto Taru, Futatsu no Taizai ga Aru. Aseri to Taida da." (Japanese: あらゆる罪の源たる、ふたつの大罪がある。焦りと怠惰だ。)	Kentarō Iino	Hayato Kazano	Takahiro Tanaka	July 11, 2022
15	3	"The Greatest Souls Are Capable of the Greatest Vices as Well as of the Greatest Virtues." (Note: "Les plus grandes âmes sont capables des plus grands vices aussi bien que des plus grandes vertus." — René Descartes, Discours de la Méthode); Transliteration: "Saikō no Tamashī wa, Kono Uenai Akutoku to Kyokugen no Bitoku o Hakki Dekiru." (Japanese: 最高の魂は、この上ない悪徳と極限の美徳を発揮できる。)	Takahiro Tanaka	Kō Shigenobu	Shinichiro Kimura & Takahiro Tanaka	July 18, 2022
16	4	"The Material Has to Be Created." (Note: Quoted from Florence Nightingale, Subsidiary Notes as to the Introduction of Female Nursing into Military Hospitals in Peace and War); Transliteration: "Jinzai wa Tsukuridasu Hitsuyō ga Aru." (Japanese: 人材は作り出す必要がある。)	Yūsuke Kamata	Hayato Kazano	Yūsuke Kamata	July 25, 2022
17	5	"Every Failure Is a Step to Success." (Note: Quoted from William Whewell, Lectures on the History of Moral Philosophy in England); Transliteration: "Subete no Shippai wa Seikō e no Katei ni Suginai." (Japanese: すべての失敗は成功への過程に過ぎない。)	Tarō Kubo & Hideki Takayama	Kō Shigenobu	Hiroshi Matsuzono	August 1, 2022
18	6	"Adversity Is the First Path to Truth." (Note: Quoted from Lord Byron, Don Juan); Transliteration: "Gyakkyō wa Shinjitsu e to Itaru Saisho no Michisuji de Aru." (Japanese: 逆境は真実へと至る最初の道筋である。)	Sō Kendai & Hayato Kazano	Hayato Kazano	Toshihiko Masuda & Seiji Kishi	August 8, 2022
19	7	"To Doubt Everything or to Believe Everything Are Two Equally Convenient Solutions; Both Dispense with the Necessity of Reflection." (Note: "Douter de tout ou tout croire, ce sont deux solutions également commodes, qui l'une et l'autre nous dispensent de réfléchir." — Henri Poincaré, La Science et l'Hypothèse); Transliteration: "Subete o Utagau Koto mo Subete o Shinjiru Koto mo Tomoni Ani de, Shikō o Hōki Suru ni Hitoshii." (Japanese: すべてを疑うこともすべてを信じることも共に安易で、思考を放棄するに等しい。)	Yasunori Gotō	Kō Shigenobu	Tomohiro Matsukawa & Yūsuke Kamata	August 15, 2022
20	8	"The Wound Is at Her Heart." (Note: "Tacitum vivit sub pectore vulnus." — Virgil, Aeneis); Transliteration: "Mune no Soko de, Kizu wa Shizuka ni Ikite Iru." (Japanese: 胸の底で、傷は静かに生きている。)	Masaru Kanamori	Hayato Kazano	Hiroshi Matsuzono	August 22, 2022
21	9	"If You Make a Mistake and Do Not Correct It, This Is Called a Mistake." (Note: "Guò ér bù gǎi, shì wèiguò yǐ" — Confucius, Lúnyǔ); Transliteration: "Ayamachi o Okashi Nagara, Sore o Aratamenai Koto o Koso, Shin no Ayamachi Toiu." (Japanese: 過ちを犯しながら、それを改めないことをこそ、真の過ちという。)	Yōhei Fukui & Takahiro Tanaka	Kō Shigenobu	Masaki Kitamura & Daisei Fukuoka	August 29, 2022
22	10	"People, Often Deceived by An Illusive Good, Desire Their Own Ruin." (Note: "Il popolo molte volte desidera la rovina sua, ingannato da una falsa specie di bene." — Niccolò Machiavelli, Discorsi sopra la prima deca di Tito Livio); Transliteration: "Hitobito wa Tsuneni Sono Hametsu o Negatte Iru. Itsuwari no Zen ni Azamukareru ga Yue ni." (Japanese: 人々は常にその破滅を願っている。偽りの善に欺かれるがゆえに。)	Yūsuke Kamata	Kō Shigenobu	Masaki Kitamura, Hito Tadano, Yama Mamimu, Miki Sorakubo & Mai Sakamoto	September 5, 2022
23	11	"A Man Who Cannot Command Himself Will Always Be a Slave." (Note: "Wer sich nicht selbst befiehlt, bleibt immer Knecht." — Johann Wolfgang von Goethe, Zahme Xenien); Transliteration: "Jibun Jishin o Gyosenai Mono wa, Itsumade mo Dorei no Mamada." (Japanese: 自分自身を御せない者は、いつまでも奴隷のままだ。)	Takahiro Tanaka, Ippei Ichii & Masaru Kanamori	Hayato Kazano	Masaki Kitamura, Yama Mamimu & Hito Tadano	September 12, 2022
24	12	"Force Without Wisdom Falls of Its Own Weight." (Note: "Vis consilii expers mole ruit sua." — Horace, Odes III); Transliteration: "Shiryo naki Chikara wa Mizukara no Shitsuryō ni Yotte Kuzuresaru." (Japanese: 思慮なき力は自らの質量によって崩れ去る。)	Yūsuke Kamata, Masaru Kanamori, Masaki Kitamura, Kanae Komoda & Shin'ichirō Kitamura	Kō Shigenobu	Masaki Kitamura & Takehiko Matsumoto	September 19, 2022
25	13	"The Worst Enemy You Can Meet Will Always Be Yourself." (Note: "Der schlimmste Feind, dem du begegnen kannst, wirst du immer dir selber sein." — Friedrich Nietzsche, Also sprach Zarathustra: Ein Buch für Alle und Keinen); Transliteration: "Anata ga Deau Saiaku no Teki wa, Tsuneni Anata Jishin da." (Japanese: あなたが出会う最悪の敵は、常にあなた自身だ。)	Hiroyuki Hashimoto	Hayato Kazano	Daisei Fukuoka & Hiroyuki Hashimoto	September 26, 2022

=== Season 3 (2024) ===
No. overall	No. in season	Title	Directed by	Written by	Storyboarded by	Original release date
26	1	"The Strongest Principle of Growth Lies in the Human Choice." (Note: Quoted from George Eliot, Daniel Deronda); Transliteration: "Nanika o Erabu Koto Koso ga, Seichō no Saidai no Kate to Naru." (Japanese: 何かを選ぶことこそが、成長の最大の糧となる。)	Masaru Kanamori	Yasushi Shigenobu	Yoshiaki Okumura & Masaki Kitamura	January 3, 2024
27	2	"Man Is Wolf to Man." (Note: "Homo homini lupus" — Plautus, Asinaria); Transliteration: "Hito ni Totte, Hoka no Ningen wa Dōmōna Ōkami no Yōna Monoda." (Japanese: 人にとって、他の人間は獰猛な狼のようなものだ。)	Susumu Yamamoto	Yasushi Shigenobu	Yusuke Saito & Yuichi Itou	January 10, 2024
28	3	"We Never Forget What We Endeavor to Forget." (Note: "Man vergisst nicht, wenn man vergessen will." — Friedrich Nietzsche, Morgenröte); Transliteration: "Wasuretai Koto Hodo, Wasureru Koto wa Dekinai." (Japanese: 忘れたいことほど、忘れることはできない。)	Yuki Nagasawa	Ukyō Kodachi	Yusuke Saito & Shūichirō Semura	January 17, 2024
29	4	"To Work You Have the Right, But Not to the Fruits Thereof." (Note: "Karmaṇy-evādhikāras te mā phaleṣhu kadāchana" — Srimad Bhagavad Gita); Transliteration: "Anata ni Dekiru no wa Jibun no Mokuteki no Tame ni Kōdō Suru Koto Made de, Sono Kekka o Nozomu yō ni Suru Koto wa Dekinai." (Japanese: あなたにできるのは自分の目的のために行動することまでで、その結果を望むようにすることはできない。)	Hideki Tonokatsu	Kyōko Katsuya	Hiromitsu Kanazawa	January 24, 2024
30	5	"Fortune Favors the Bold." (Note: "Fortes fortuna adjuvat." — Virgil, Aeneis); Transliteration: "Unmei wa Yūkiaru Mono wo Tasukeru." (Japanese: 運命は勇気ある者を助ける。)	Masaru Kanemori	Ukyō Kodachi	Haruki Nekusu	January 31, 2024
31	6	"It Is Better to Receive an Injury than to Inflict One." (Note: "Accipere quam facere injuriam praestat." — Cicero, Tusculanae Disputationes); Transliteration: "Aku wo Okonau Yori mo, Sono Aku ni Kizutsuke Rareru Hou ga Ii." (Japanese: 悪を行うよりも、その悪に傷つけられる方が良い。)	Takuma Suzuki	Kyōko Katsuya	Yusuke Saito & Shūichirō Semura	February 7, 2024
32	7	"People Will Do Anything, No Matter How Absurd, In Order to Avoid Facing Their Own Souls." (Note: Quoted from C.G. Jung, Psychology and Alchemy); Transliteration: "Hito wa Mizukara no Honshitsu to Mukiau no o Yokeru Tamenara, Don'na Orokana Okonai Nimote o Somete Shimau." (Japanese: 人は自らの本質と向き合うのを避けるためなら、 どんな愚かな行いにも手を染めてしまう。)	Nana Fujiwara	Yasushi Shigenobu	Hiromitsu Kanazawa	February 14, 2024
33	8	"Those Who Cannot Remember the Past are Condemned to Repeat It." (Note: Quoted from George Santayana, The Life of Reason: Or, The Phases of Human Progress); Transliteration: "Kako o Kaeriminu Mono wa Sore o Kurikaeshi, Sabakareru." (Japanese: 過去を顧みぬ者はそれを繰り返し、裁かれる。)	Takuma Suzuki	Yasushi Shigenobu	Hirokazu Hisayuki & Yusuke Saito	February 21, 2024
34	9	"Extreme Justice Is Extreme Injustice." (Note: "Summum jus summa injuria." — Cicero, De Officiis); Transliteration: "Saikō no hō wa, Saidai no Fusei o Umidasu." (Japanese: 最高の法は、最大の不正を生み出す。)	Haruki Nekusu	Ukyō Kodachi	Haruki Nekusu	February 28, 2024
35	10	"The First Cause of Absurd Conclusions I Ascribe to the Want of Method." (Note: Quoted from Thomas Hobbes, Leviathan); Transliteration: "Fujōrina Ketsuron ni Itaru Daiichi no Gen'in wa, Kaiketsu no Shudan ga Fusoku Shite Iru Kotoda." (Japanese: 不条理な結論に至る第一の原因は、 解決の手段が不足していることだ。)	Yuki Nagasawa	Kyōko Katsuya	Hiroyuki Shimazu	March 6, 2024
36	11	"There Is Only One Rule in Love: Bring Happiness to Those You Love." (Note: "Il n'y a qu'une loi en sentiment. C'est de faire le bonheur de ce qu'on aime." — Stendhal, Journal, 19 June 1805); Transliteration: "Ai ni wa Tatta Hitotsu no Kimari Shika Nai. Sore wa Aisuru Mono o Kōfuku ni Michibiku Kotoda." (Japanese: 愛にはたったひとつの決まりしかない。それは愛する者を幸福に導くことだ。)	Masaru Kanamori	Yasushi Shigenobu	Goichi Iwahata, Hiroyuki Shimazu, Hiromitsu Kanazawa & Hideki Okamoto	March 13, 2024
37	12	"Change Your Desires Rather than the Order of the World." (Note: "À changer mes désirs que l'ordre du monde." — René Descartes, Discours de la Méthode); Transliteration: "Yokubō no Tame ni Sekai o Kaeru Node wa Naku, Mazu Onore o Kae yo." (Japanese: 欲望のために世界を変えるのではなく、まず己を変えよ。)	Masaru Kanamori & Yuuki Nagasawa	Kyōko Katsuya	Yusuke Saito	March 20, 2024
38	13	"Love Is the Best Teacher." (Note: "Amor magister est optimus." — Pliny the Younger, Epistulae); Transliteration: "Ai wa Mottomo Yoi Kyōshide Aru." (Japanese: 愛は最も良い教師である。)	Hiroyuki Hashimoto	Yasushi Shigenobu	Hiroyuki Hashimoto	March 27, 2024

=== Season 4 (2026) ===
No. overall	No. in season	Title	Directed by	Written by	Storyboarded by	Original release date
39	1	"Assassin From the White Room" (Note: Sicarii ex Camera Alba); Transliteration: "Howaito Rūmu Kara no Shikaku" (Japanese: ホワイトルームからの刺客)	Yū Kinome	Yasushi Shigenobu	Noriyuki Nogi & Wataru Matsumi	April 1, 2026
40	2	"Contract and Payment (Note: Contractus et Praemium)"; Transliteration: "Keiyaku to Daishō" (Japanese: 契約と代償)	Yū Kinome	Yasushi Shigenobu	Yō Nakano & Yū Kinome	April 1, 2026
41	3	"Determination of a Leader (Note: Dux Votorum Virtutis)"; Transliteration: "Rīdā taru Kakugo" (Japanese: リーダーたる覚悟)	Mako Shiina	Yasushi Shigenobu	Noriyo Sasaki	April 1, 2026
42	4	"To Whom the Blade Turns (Note: Quis Gladio affici Potest)"; Transliteration: "Yaiba o muku Saki" (Japanese: 刃を向く先)	Noriyuki Nogi	Yasushi Shigenobu	Masaki Kitamura	April 1, 2026
43	5	"The Twenty-Million Man (Note: Vir Aestimationis Viginti milionum)" Transliteration: "Nisenman no Otoko" (Japanese: 2000万の男)	Hiromi Takenouchi	Yasushi Shigenobu	Daisuke Nakajima	April 8, 2026
44	6	"A Tumultuous Scramble (Note: Certamen Tumultuosum ad Suadendum)"; Transliteration: "Haran no sōdatsu sen" (Japanese: 波乱の争奪戦)	Lisa Notaro, Yūka Tsuda, Mako Shiina & Noriyuki Nogi	Kyōko Katsuya	Noriyo Sasaki	April 15, 2026
45	7	"Plotting (Note: Consilium Dolosum)"; Transliteration: "An'yaku" (Japanese: 暗躍)	Mako Shiina, Yūka Tsuda; Lisa Notaro & Noriyuki Nogi	Yasushi Shigenobu	Noriaki Saito	April 22, 2026
46	8	"The Subject of the Dragon's Gaze (Note: Magna Ambitio Draconum)"; Transliteration: "Ryū-tachi no mitsumeru mono" (Japanese: 龍たちの見つめるもの)	Koichiro Takatsu	Yasushi Shigenobu	Daisuke Nakajima	April 29, 2026
47	9	"A Disquieting Beginning (Note: Initium Ominosum)"; Transliteration: "Fuon naru kaimaku" (Japanese: 不穏なる開幕)	Mako Shiina, Lisa Notaro, Yūka Tsuda & Noriyuki Nogi	Kyōko Katsuya	Noriaki Saito	May 6, 2026
48	10	"Love Uncommunicated (Note: Amor Ineffabilis)"; Transliteration: "Todokanu Omoi" (Japanese: 届かぬ想い)	Ken Yoshino, Yūka Tsuda, Mako Shiina, Lisa Notaro & Noriyuki Nogi	Yasushi Shigenobu	Hatsumida Shiyo	May 13, 2026
49	11	"Connection (Note: Nexus)"; Transliteration: "Enishi" (Japanese: 縁(えにし))	Mako Shiina, Atsuko Tononizu & Noriyuki Nogi	Kyōko Katsuya	Noriaki Saito	May 20, 2026
50	12	"After Vengeance (Note: Finis Vicissitudines Vindictae)"; Transliteration: "Onshū no hate ni" (Japanese: 怨讐の果てに)	Yuuki Nagasawa & Noriyuki Nogi	Yasushi Shigenobu	Daisuke Nakajima	May 27, 2026
51	13	"Obscured By the Rain (Note: Pluvia Futura Celat)"; Transliteration: "Ame ni kemuru" (Japanese: 雨に煙る)	Lisa Notaro, Ken Yoshino, Yūka Tsuda & Mako Shiina	Kyōko Katsuya	Yū Kinome	June 3, 2026
52	14	"The Extraordinary Prodigy (Note: Prodigium Eximium)"; Transliteration: "Kokō no Kirinji" (Japanese: 孤高の麒麟児)	Yuuki Nagasawa & Noriyuki Nogi	Yasushi Shigenobu	Kosei Satō	June 10, 2026
53	15	"Power and Will (Note: Vis et Voluntas)"; Transliteration: "Chikara to Ishi" (Japanese: 力と意志)	Ken Yoshino & Noriyuki Nogi	Kyōko Katsuya	Noriaki Saito	June 17, 2026
54	16	"For a Desired Future (Note: Pro Desiderato Futuro)"; Transliteration: "Aru Mirai no Tame ni" (Japanese: ある未来のために)	Noriyuki Nogi	Yasushi Shigenobu	Hatsumida Shiyo & Hatsuki Tsuji	June 24, 2026
