= Classroom of the Elite season 3 =

2024 Japanese anime series

Classroom of the Elite
- Season 3
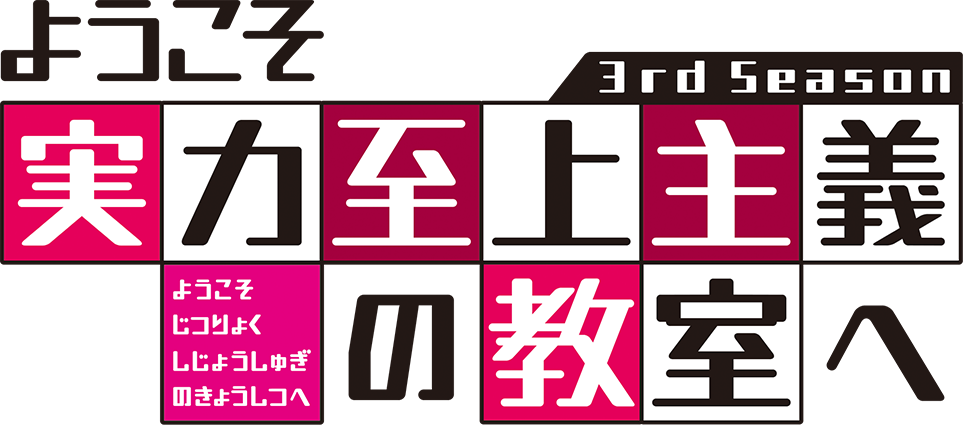
- Logo of the third season
- No. of episodes: 13

Release
- Original network: AT-X
- Original release: January 3 – March 27, 2024

Season chronology
- ← Previous; Season 2 Next → Season 4

Classroom of the Elite is an anime television series based on the light novel series of the same name written by Shōgo Kinugasa and illustrated by Shunsaku Tomose. The third season of the series was announced in March 2022, with Lerche returning to produce from the previous two seasons. The season is directed by Yoshihito Nishōji, with Kishi and Hashimoto returning as chief directors, and Morita as the character designer. Yasushi Shigenobu and Hayato Kazano served as screenwriters. Masaru Yokoyama and Kana Hashiguchi are composing the music. The season was adapted from the remaining volumes of the first-year arc, and was scheduled to be released in 2023, but was delayed, and eventually aired from January 3 to March 27, 2024. The opening theme song is "Minor Piece", performed by ZAQ, while the ending theme is "Konsei Dai Kakumei" (今世大革命; "The Great Revolution of this World") and "Fixer", both performed by Yui Ninomiya.

== Episodes ==
No. overall	No. in season	Title (Note: All English titles are taken from Crunchyroll.) (Note: The episode titles are taken from literature by various European (with one exception) philosophers.)	Directed by	Written by	Storyboarded by	Original release date
26	1	"The Strongest Principle of Growth Lies in the Human Choice." (Note: Quoted from George Eliot, Daniel Deronda); Transliteration: "Nanika o Erabu Koto Koso ga, Seichō no Saidai no Kate to Naru." (Japanese: 何かを選ぶことこそが、成長の最大の糧となる。)	Masaru Kanamori	Yasushi Shigenobu	Yoshiaki Okumura & Masaki Kitamura	January 3, 2024
On a field trip to the mixed training camp for the third semester, Ryūen's group move to Class D for demotion and Ayanokōji's group on Class C for promotion. Nagumo replaces Manabu as the school council president. While all students are staying separately at the inn, they take miscellaneous activities. Yamauchi inadvertently trips Arisu on the walking stick, before leaving. That night, Karuizawa tells Ayanokōji that he left a note for her. Ayanokōji meets the student council vice president Ikuto Kiriyama, whom Manabu accompanies.
27	2	"Man Is Wolf to Man." (Note: "Homo homini lupus" — Plautus, Asinaria); Transliteration: "Hito ni Totte, Hoka no Ningen wa Dōmōna Ōkami no Yōna Monoda." (Japanese: 人にとって、他の人間は獰猛な狼のようなものだ。)	Susumu Yamamoto	Yasushi Shigenobu	Yusuke Saito & Yuichi Itou	January 10, 2024
Ayanokōji returns the amulet to Nazuna Asahina when she inadvertently drops it. After the discussion, Ayanokōji discovers Manabu, Nagumo, and Ryūen conversing about the plan. After the fourth test of the marathon, Nagumo and Momoko Ikari put the blame on Akane for not helping the group, but Manabu sacrifices the points to save Akane from expulsion. Some time later, Ayanokōji and Karuizawa discuss about Nagumo and Akane.
28	3	"We Never Forget What We Endeavor to Forget." (Note: "Man vergisst nicht, wenn man vergessen will." — Friedrich Nietzsche, Morgenröte); Transliteration: "Wasuretai Koto Hodo, Wasureru Koto wa Dekinai." (Japanese: 忘れたいことほど、忘れることはできない。)	Yuki Nagasawa	Ukyō Kodachi	Yusuke Saito & Shūichirō Semura	January 17, 2024
After all students and teachers return to school near Tokyo, Arisu discusses with Nagumo. Ayanokōji and Suzune discuss the truth about Hirata and Karuizawa ending their relationship. Yamauchi leaves the class and follows Arisu visiting the rest of all Class C students. After spending time with Mei-Yu Wang, Hiyori Shiina, Suzune, and Ichinose, Ayanokōji receives a phone call from an unknown person. The next day, Ichinose receives a note about her past, and Ayanokōji learns from Masumi Kamuro that she has been in trouble for shoplifting before Arisu followed her. Ayanokōji receives a phone call from Manabu, and he tells him that Kushida has made contact with Nagumo.
29	4	"To Work You Have the Right, But Not to the Fruits Thereof." (Note: "Karmaṇy-evādhikāras te mā phaleṣhu kadāchana" — Srimad Bhagavad Gita); Transliteration: "Anata ni Dekiru no wa Jibun no Mokuteki no Tame ni Kōdō Suru Koto Made de, Sono Kekka o Nozomu yō ni Suru Koto wa Dekinai." (Japanese: あなたにできるのは自分の目的のために行動することまでで、その結果を望むようにすることはできない。)	Hideki Tonokatsu	Kyōko Katsuya	Hiromitsu Kanazawa	January 24, 2024
On Valentine's Day, all students receive gifts of chocolate packages. Masayoshi Hashimoto eavesdrop on Ayanokōji and Karuizawa spending time together near the library. Ayanokōji receives a contact from Hashimoto, and delivers a package to Ichinose, while she catches a cold. The next day, all students receive the following messages about misinformation: Ayanokōji and Karuizawa are in a relationship, Ryotaro Hondo has been dating with girls, Satsuki Shinohara being a prostitute, and Maya Sato disliking Kayano Onodera. Yamauchi allegedly attempts to recommend the evidence for the students of Class C.
30	5	"Fortune Favors the Bold." (Note: "Fortes fortuna adjuvat." — Virgil, Aeneis); Transliteration: "Unmei wa Yūkiaru Mono wo Tasukeru." (Japanese: 運命は勇気ある者を助ける。)	Masaru Kanemori	Ukyō Kodachi	Haruki Nekusu	January 31, 2024
The students argue about false rumors. Ike informs all students of Class C about Arisu's group of Class A visiting the students of Class B. Ichinose reveals the truth that she was a shoplifter four years ago, while living with her mother and sister. Ichinose visited her mother at the hospital. Unable to get any part time jobs, Ichinose stole a hairpin as a birthday gift requested by her sister. However, Ichinose got berated by her mother and they returned it to the store. She spent six months rebuking herself and read an encouragement note from her mother. Determined to restore her trust to her family, Ichinose arrived at the high school and started studying there. The students of Class B plan to save Ichinose from expulsion. After a meeting with Arisu, Ayanokōji tells Kushida that he had a discussion with Kiriyama about Nagumo. The next day, Ayanokōji receives a gift from Ichinose.
31	6	"It Is Better to Receive an Injury than to Inflict One." (Note: "Accipere quam facere injuriam praestat." — Cicero, Tusculanae Disputationes); Transliteration: "Aku wo Okonau Yori mo, Sono Aku ni Kizutsuke Rareru Hou ga Ii." (Japanese: 悪を行うよりも、その悪に傷つけられる方が良い。)	Takuma Suzuki	Kyōko Katsuya	Yusuke Saito & Shūichirō Semura	February 7, 2024
Chabashira announces a special exam to all students of Class C about class poll: In four days, a student can evaluate other classmates, and vote for three most of deserving praise or criticism. The student with positive votes will receive a protection point. Before any student will be expelled from school, he or she can reverse a decision. The lowest scoring student with negative votes will be expelled. The goal of the exam determines for any students between negative or positive votes. Any student with the protection point cannot be transferred to another one. The expulsion does not have a penalty. The voting will be repeated until a failed student gets expelled. A positive vote from the student outside of class can be added, but it does not control the outcome. The school will overturn the expulsion if the student spends 20,000,000 private points. None of the students can abstain or vote anonymously more than once. The vote will held for four days. After class, Suzune talks to Ryūen, and Ayanokōji discusses with Karuizawa about the upcoming exam. The next day, Ayanokōji consults with Arisu, and Ichinose convinces Nagumo to let her stay at school.
32	7	"People Will Do Anything, No Matter How Absurd, In Order to Avoid Facing Their Own Souls." (Note: Quoted from C.G. Jung, Psychology and Alchemy); Transliteration: "Hito wa Mizukara no Honshitsu to Mukiau no o Yokeru Tamenara, Don'na Orokana Okonai Nimote o Somete Shimau." (Japanese: 人は自らの本質と向き合うのを避けるためなら、 どんな愚かな行いにも手を染めてしまう。)	Nana Fujiwara	Yasushi Shigenobu	Hiromitsu Kanazawa	February 14, 2024
After spending time with other students, Ayanokōji talks to Hirata, Ichinose, Karuizawa, and Kushida about the voting exam. The next day, Suzune consults with Manabu on the school roof. Before the supplemental exam can occur tomorrow, Suzune chooses Yamauchi.
33	8	"Those Who Cannot Remember the Past are Condemned to Repeat It." (Note: Quoted from George Santayana, The Life of Reason: Or, The Phases of Human Progress); Transliteration: "Kako o Kaeriminu Mono wa Sore o Kurikaeshi, Sabakareru." (Japanese: 過去を顧みぬ者はそれを繰り返し、裁かれる。)	Takuma Suzuki	Yasushi Shigenobu	Hirokazu Hisayuki & Yusuke Saito	February 21, 2024
Before the Special Exam, Horikita gave a speech on why voting Yamauchi was the best plan for the class to go forward. Before the results are revealed, Yamauchi warns everyone not to expel him, because he wanted Class A to get positive votes for him, so the number of negative ones that Class C gives will be negated. However, Manabe, Totsuka, and Yamauchi suffer a nervous breakdown, and are expelled from the school after receiving negative votes for Class A, C, and D. However, Class B did not expel Ichinose and Ayanokōji becomes the highest-voted student in the Special Exam. A few days before the expulsion occurred, Ayanokōji gave advice for Ishizaki and Mio to save Ryūen and Ichinose. After Ryūen confirms the final results at the end of the day, Ayanokōji receives a message from Arisu.
34	9	"Extreme Justice Is Extreme Injustice." (Note: "Summum jus summa injuria." — Cicero, De Officiis); Transliteration: "Saikō no hō wa, Saidai no Fusei o Umidasu." (Japanese: 最高の法は、最大の不正を生み出す。)	Haruki Nekusu	Ukyō Kodachi	Haruki Nekusu	February 28, 2024
Ayanokōji and Arisu meet up with the school chairman Tsukishiro. He tells Ayanokōji to leave the school, but he does not comply. Ayanokōji asks Arisu to have a battle for the next exam. The next day, Chabashira discusses with the students of Class C about twenty events: They cannot take duplicated ones, use equipment, or class sizes at this time of year. The school staff provides questions and the rules will be for a student to continue for the draw during the event. For each round, the school randomly selects the proposing one. No student can join for the second time, until the previous one finishes the first one. The leading student may not complete in events, but can interfere in any of them and win bonus points if the class wins. However, the leader will be expelled if the class loses. After school, the leader can select an opponent class by lottery. Ayanokōji, Arisu, Ichinose, and Satoru Kaneda become a group of school leaders for the event. When Hirata breaks down and leaves the classroom, Ayanokōji talks to Karuizawa, and accompany Manabu and Akane. The students prep for the upcoming school event.
35	10	"The First Cause of Absurd Conclusions I Ascribe to the Want of Method." (Note: Quoted from Thomas Hobbes, Leviathan); Transliteration: "Fujōrina Ketsuron ni Itaru Daiichi no Gen'in wa, Kaiketsu no Shudan ga Fusoku Shite Iru Kotoda." (Japanese: 不条理な結論に至る第一の原因は、 解決の手段が不足していることだ。)	Yuki Nagasawa	Kyōko Katsuya	Hiroyuki Shimazu	March 6, 2024
While Hirata gets isolated from all students, Yukimura tells Ayanokōji and Suzune about the condition that the students will spend 20 million points in order to move to Class A and have Katsuragi get demoted to Class C. However, Katsuragi refuses but only if he agrees after the event. Mei and Kōenji fail to persuade Hirata, but Ayanokōji asks him to overcome his negative emotion. Hirata tells Ayanokōji that his close friend had a suicide attempt and was sent to the hospital. Ayanokōji replies to Hirata that he made Yamauchi expelled from school. Hirata reconciles with the students of Class C, while Ayanokōji and Suzune play an online game of chess. The next day on the final special exam, Ryūen talks to Ayanokōji, Arisu, and Ichinose.
36	11	"There Is Only One Rule in Love: Bring Happiness to Those You Love." (Note: "Il n'y a qu'une loi en sentiment. C'est de faire le bonheur de ce qu'on aime." — Stendhal, Journal, 19 June 1805); Transliteration: "Ai ni wa Tatta Hitotsu no Kimari Shika Nai. Sore wa Aisuru Mono o Kōfuku ni Michibiku Kotoda." (Japanese: 愛にはたったひとつの決まりしかない。それは愛する者を幸福に導くことだ。)	Masaru Kanamori	Yasushi Shigenobu	Goichi Iwahata, Hiroyuki Shimazu, Hiromitsu Kanazawa & Hideki Okamoto	March 13, 2024
In a past flashback, Arisu watches Ayanokōji winning the game of chess. Back in the present day, Ayanokōji and Arisu compete while selecting separated students on each events. Sudo wins the basketball game, other students compete on other tests, Katsuragi and Emi Tamiya defeat Kōenji and Chiaki Matsushita in Mental Arithmetic, and Hashimoto defeats Suzune in the game of chess. After the final exam ended, Tsukishiro reveals the truth that he has interfered it, forcing Ayanokōji to forfeit with the protection point and let Arisu win the exam. Ayanokōji discusses with Arisu about the exam.
37	12	"Change Your Desires Rather than the Order of the World." (Note: "À changer mes désirs que l'ordre du monde." — René Descartes, Discours de la Méthode); Transliteration: "Yokubō no Tame ni Sekai o Kaeru Node wa Naku, Mazu Onore o Kae yo." (Japanese: 欲望のために世界を変えるのではなく、まず己を変えよ。)	Masaru Kanamori & Yuuki Nagasawa	Kyōko Katsuya	Yusuke Saito	March 20, 2024
After Manabu tells the students and staff at the graduation ceremony that on his last day that he will leave the school, Chabashira tells the students of Class C that they have succeeded the test. Ayanokōji recalls his memory about calling Arisu's father on the phone. Ayanokōji attends the meeting with Arisu, Chabashira, and Tomonari Mashima. After the celebration party, Suzune cuts her hair short and impresses Manabu, before parting ways.
38	13	"Love Is the Best Teacher." (Note: "Amor magister est optimus." — Pliny the Younger, Epistulae); Transliteration: "Ai wa Mottomo Yoi Kyōshide Aru." (Japanese: 愛は最も良い教師である。)	Hiroyuki Hashimoto	Yasushi Shigenobu	Hiroyuki Hashimoto	March 27, 2024
While the rest of all students spend their time off from school, Ichinose promises Ayanokōji that she will reach Class A someday. After telling Tsukishiro that he will not return to the White Room, Ayanokōji talks to Matsushita in person and Suzune on the phone. Some time later, Ayanokōji asks Karuizawa to go on a date.
