= Classroom of the Elite (TV series) =

Japanese anime television series

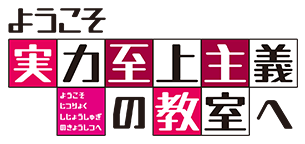
- ようこそ実力至上主義の教室へ; Yōkoso Jitsuryoku Shijō Shugi no Kyōshitsu e
- Genre: Psychological thriller
- Based on: Classroom of the Elite by Shōgo Kinugasa
- Developed by: Aoi Akashiro (S1); Hayato Kazano (S2–S3); Yasushi Shigenobu (S3–S4)
- Directed by: Seiji Kishi (Chief, S2–S3); Hiroyuki Hashimoto (Chief, S2–S3); Yoshihito Nishōji (S2–S3); Noriyuki Nomata (S4-S5)
- Voices of: Shōya Chiba; Akari Kitō; Ayana Taketatsu; Nao Tōyama; Masaaki Mizunaka; Yurika Kubo
- Music by: Ryo Takahashi (S1); Masaru Yokoyama (S2–S4); Kana Hashiguchi (S2–S4)
- Country of origin: Japan
- Original language: Japanese
- No. of seasons: 4
- No. of episodes: 54 (list of episodes)

Production
- Producers: List of producers: Aya Iizuka; Akihito Ikemoto; Ashitate Harutaka; Hideo Itō; Mieko Tsuruta; Yūta Kashiwabara; Shō Tanaka; Mitsuhiro Ogata; Masakatsu Umeda; Nobuhiko Kurosu; Yūki Muramatsu; Akihiro Sotokawa; Kenichi Tokumura; Terushige Yoshie; Yūka Nemoto; Shunsuke Matsuda; Kōichi Sano; Keiichi Oomura; Tatsuya Ishiguro
- Animator: Lerche
- Production company: Youzitsu Partners (Note: Label consisting of various companies.)

Original release
- Network: AT-X, Tokyo MX, TV Aichi, KBS Kyoto, SUN, TVQ, BS11
- Release: July 12, 2017 – present

Classroom of the Elite (Japanese: ようこそ実力至上主義の教室へ, Hepburn: Yōkoso Jitsuryoku Shijōshugi no Kyōshitsu e; lit. 'Welcome to the Classroom of Real Ability Supremacism'), abbreviated as Yōjitsu (よう実) in Japan, is a Japanese anime television series based on the light novel series Classroom of the Elite written by Shōgo Kinugasa and illustrated by Shunsaku Tomose.

The anime premiered in July 2017. Following a multi-year hiatus, the second and third season were produced to complete the adaptation of the original light novel's "First Year" arc. As of 2026, the series has completed four television seasons, and is currently adapting the "Second Year" arc. A fifth season is set to premiere in 2027.

== Plot ==
The Tokyo Metropolitan Advanced Nurturing High School is a government-run institution where students are divided into four ranked classes (A through D). The school uses the "S-System," which awards "Private Points" based on class merit. Class D begins the series with zero points after failing to adhere to school regulations.

=== Season 1 ===
Kiyotaka Ayanokōji enrolls in Class D and meets Suzune Horikita and Kikyō Kushida. The class discovers that their monthly point allowance is tied to their collective behavior and academic performance. After the class fails their midterms, Ayanokōji and Horikita use points to "buy" the passing grades of several students to prevent their expulsion. Class D student Ken Sudō is accused of assaulting three students from Class C. A hearing is held before the Student Council to determine his expulsion. Ayanokōji and Horikita set up a security camera trap to coerce the Class C students into withdrawing their complaint, resulting in Sudō remaining in school. The school conducts a Special Test on a deserted island. Each class is given 300 points to survive for a week; remaining points are added to their class total. Classes must designate a secret "leader." Despite internal sabotage and the theft of Horikita's keycard, Class D wins the exam after Ayanokōji correctly identifies the leaders of Class A and Class C while successfully hiding Class D's leader.

=== Season 2 ===
Students are divided into 12 groups based on the Western zodiac for the "Zodiac Test." One "VIP" is hidden in each group. The objective is to identify the VIP through group discussions. During the exam, Ayanokōji discovers Kei Karuizawa's history of being bullied and forms a pact to protect her in exchange for her cooperation in his future plans. The school holds a sports festival where Class D is paired with Class A against Class B and Class C. Kakeru Ryūen of Class C uses a traitor within Class D to sabotage their efforts. Despite the internal interference, Ayanokōji wins a relay race against Student Council President Manabu Horikita, though Class D finishes last in the overall standings. The students take the "Paper Shuffle" exam, where classes design test questions for their rivals. Class D is paired against Class C. Horikita manages the class's study groups, while Ayanokōji prevents Kushida from sabotaging the class's exam papers. Ryūen kidnaps and interrogates Kei Karuizawa at a construction site to force the "mastermind" of Class D into the open. Ayanokōji arrives and physically defeats Ryūen and his associates. Ryūen takes responsibility for the incident and steps down as Class C's leader, and Class D is subsequently promoted to Class C.

=== Season 3 ===
Students are sent to a mountain facility for a "Mixed Training Camp." They are divided into groups by gender and grade level, requiring cooperation between rival classes. The exam focuses on traditional arts, physical endurance, and a final written test. The school introduces an emergency exam: the "Class Poll." Each student must cast three "praise" votes and three "censure" votes for their own classmates. The student with the most censure votes in each class is expelled. This results in the expulsion of Shiho Manabe from Class C, Yahiko Totsuka from Class A, and Yamauchi Haruki from the original Class D. The final exam of the year is the "Event Selection Exam." Class leaders choose seven specific events (such as chess, basketball, or written tests) to compete in. Ayanokōji faces Arisu Sakayanagi of Class A in a chess match. Although Ayanokōji’s move is winning, Acting Director Tsukishiro uses the school's computer system to change the move, leading to a Class A victory. The school year ends with Class C downgraded back to Class D and moving toward the second year.

=== Season 4 ===
Classroom of the Elite Season 4 initiates the dangerous Second Year arc as Kiyotaka Ayanokoji and his peers return to Tokyo Metropolitan Advanced Nurturing High School where they are met by an immediate existential threat from Acting Director Tsukishiro who operates under the cold-blooded orders of Ayanokoji’s father. Underneath these orders, he infiltrates prodigies from the White Room among the new freshmen and attaches an attractive reward on Ayanokoji’s expulsion. Hostilities begin right away when Tsukishiro subjects them to a partner exam which ties up first-year and second-year students and puts Ayanokoji at risk of expulsion if an operator actively harms their grades for mutual destruction. At the same time, Ayanokoji is engaged in a bet with Suzune Horikita in which she gets drafted into the student council while he discloses his hidden abilities putting his cover to waste. Amid the volatile alliances and the presence of formidable freshmen like Ichika Amasawa, Tsubasa Nanase, and Kazuomi Hosen, the story is resolved during the two-week Uninhabited Island ordeal involving all three grades. In the process of vicious psychological games played throughout these two weeks, Ayanokoji deftly undermines Tsukishiro’s plans, receives a genuine confession of love from Honami Ichinose and eliminates his adversaries. The semester ends with Class D promoted back to Class C.

== Series overview ==
Season	Episodes	Originally released	
Season	Episodes	First released	Last released
1	12	July 12, 2017	September 27, 2017
2	13	July 4, 2022	September 26, 2022
3	13	January 3, 2024	March 27, 2024
4	16	April 1, 2026	June 24, 2026
5	TBA	2027	TBA

== Cast and characters ==
Character	Japanese	English
Kiyotaka Ayanokōji (綾小路 清隆, Ayanokōji Kiyotaka)	Shōya Chiba	Justin Briner
Suzune Horikita (堀北 鈴音, Horikita Suzune)	Akari Kitō	Felecia Angelle
Kikyō Kushida (櫛田 桔梗, Kushida Kikyō)	Yurika Kubo	Sarah Wiedenheft
Kei Karuizawa (軽井沢 恵, Karuizawa Kei)	Ayana Taketatsu	Bryn Apprill
Airi Sakura (佐倉 愛里, Sakura Airi)	M.A.O	Leah Clark
Ken Sudō (須藤 健, Sudō Ken)	Eiji Takeuchi	Brandon McInnis
Yōsuke Hirata (平田 洋介, Hirata Yōsuke)	Ryōta Ōsaka	Dallas Reid
Kakeru Ryūen (龍園 翔, Ryūen Kakeru)	Masaaki Mizunaka	Eric Vale
Mio Ibuki (伊吹 澪, Ibuki Mio)	Mikako Komatsu	Jamie Marchi
Honami Ichinose (一之瀬 帆波, Ichinose Honami)	Nao Tōyama	Kristi Rothrock
Arisu Sakayanagi (坂柳 有栖, Sakayanagi Arisu)	Rina Hidaka	Trina Nishimura
Kohei Katsuragi (葛城 康平, Katsuragi Kōhei)	Satoshi Hino	Jarrod Greene
Manabu Horikita (堀北 学, Horikita Manabu)	Yūichirō Umehara	Ian Sinclair
Akane Tachibana (橘 茜, Tachibana Akane)	Konomi Kohara	Apphia Yu
Sae Chabashira (茶柱 佐枝, Chabashira Sae)	Rina Satō	Jennifer Alyx
Chie Hoshinomiya (星之宮 知恵, Hoshinomiya Chie)	Hisako Kanemoto	Sara Ragsdale
Hiyori Shiina (椎名 ひより, Shiina Hiyori)	Rie Takahashi	Jill Harris
Miyabi Nagumo (南雲 雅, Nagumo Miyabi)	Soma Saito	Stephen Fu

== Production and release ==
An anime television series adaptation aired from July 12 to September 27, 2017, on AT-X and other networks. Seiji Kishi and Hiroyuki Hashimoto directed the series at Lerche, Aoi Akashiro handled the series composition, Kazuaki Morita designed the characters, and Ryo Takahashi composed the music. The opening theme song is "Caste Room", performed by ZAQ, while the ending theme song is "Beautiful Soldier", performed by Minami.

On February 21, 2022, it was announced that a sequel was in production, which was later revealed to have two seasons, with Lerche returning as the studio. The second season is directed by Yoshihito Nishōji, with Kishi and Hashimoto serving as chief directors, Hayato Kazano replacing Akashiro as screenwriter, and Morita returning as character designer. Masaru Yokoyama and Kana Hashiguchi replaced Takahashi, and served as music composers. The second season aired from July 4 to September 26, 2022. The opening theme song is "Dance in the Game", performed by ZAQ, while the ending theme song is "Hito Shibai" (人芝居), performed by Mai Fuchigami. The third season was originally scheduled for 2023, but was delayed, and eventually aired from January 3 to March 27, 2024. The third season's opening theme song is "Minor Piece", performed by ZAQ, while the ending theme song is "Konsei Dai Kakumei" (今世大革命; "The Great Revolution of this World"), performed by Yui Ninomiya.

A fourth season, covering the first semester of the Year 2 sequel light novel series, was announced during the "MF Bunko J Natsu no Gakuensai 2024" livestream event on September 1, 2024. It is produced by Lerche and directed by Noriyuki Nomata, with the rest of the staff and cast reprising their roles. The fourth season aired from April 1 to June 24, 2026. The fourth season's opening theme song is "Monster", performed by Eir Aoi, while the ending theme song is "Liar Veil" (ライアーヴェール), performed by ZAQ.

After the airing of the final episode of the fourth season, a fifth season was announced. It is set to premiere in 2027.

=== Overseas release and distribution ===
The series logo used outside of Japan.

Crunchyroll streamed the series and Funimation streamed the English dub. iQIYI added the series onto its platform, Q3, and the Thai dub in 2022.

== Music ==
The music for the series was composed by Ryō Takahashi.

=== Theme songs ===
Season	Type	Title	Performer(s)
Season 1	Opening	"Caste Room"	ZAQ
Season 1	Ending	"Beautiful Soldier"	Minami Kuribayashi
Season 2	Opening	"Dance in the Game"	ZAQ
Season 2	Ending	"Hito Shibai"	Mai Fuchigami
Season 3	Opening	"Minor Piece"	ZAQ
Season 3	Ending	"The Great Revolution of This World"	Yui Ninomiya
Season 4	Opening	"Monster"	Eir Aoi
Season 4	Ending	"Liar Veil"	ZAQ

== Reception ==
The series has received critical acclaim, with praise for its writing, darker topics and subversion of typical high school anime tropes. Theron Martin of Anime News Network noted that the series' strength lies in its "cynical take on the high school power fantasy," specifically highlighting the protagonist's detached nature and the complex "S-System" that drives the plot. In a review of the first season's conclusion, Martin commented on the "sharp writing" regarding the island survival arc.

Writing for IGN Southeast Asia, Dale Bashir noted that the series stood out by focusing on psychological warfare over physical combat. He highlighted that the second season successfully expanded on the high stakes introduced in the first season.
