= Iino =

Iino may refer to:

- Iino (surname), a Japanese surname
- Iino Domain, a feudal domain under the Tokugawa shogunate of Edo period Japan
- Iino Castle, a castle in Ebino, Miyazaki Prefecture, Japan
- Mount Iino, a mountain of Kagawa Prefecture, Japan
- Iino, Fukushima, a former town in Date District, Fukushima Prefecture, Japan
