= Iino (surname) =

Iino (written: 飯野) is a Japanese surname. Notable people with the surname include:

- Ai Iino (飯野 愛, born 1986), Japanese shogi player
- Mayu Iino (飯野 茉優, born 1999), Japanese voice actress
- Nanasei Iino (飯野 七聖, born 1996), Japanese footballer
- Yuki Iino (飯野 雄貴, born 1994), Japanese professional wrestler

== Fictional characters ==
- Miko Iino (伊井野 ミコ), a character in the manga series Kaguya-sama: Love Is War
