= Yumeiro Patissiere =

Manga and television anime

- The cover of the first tankōbon volume of Yumeiro Patissiere as published by Shueisha under their Ribon Mascot Comics imprint.

夢色パティシエール (Yumeiro Patishiēru)
- Genre: Cooking
- Manga
- Written by: Natsumi Matsumoto
- Published by: Shueisha
- English publisher: Shueisha (digital)
- Magazine: Ribon
- Original run: October 2008 – July 2011
- Volumes: 12
- Anime television series
- Directed by: Iku Suzuki
- Studio: Studio Hibari (animation); Pierrot (production)
- Licensed by: NA: Maiden Japan
- Original network: NNS (YTV), Disney Channel
- Original run: October 4, 2009 – December 26, 2010
- Episodes: 63 + OVA

Yumeiro Patissiere (Japanese: 夢色パティシエール, Hepburn: Yumeiro Patishiēru; lit. Dream-Colored Pastry Chef, sometimes stylized Yumeiro Pâtissière) is a shōjo manga and anime series by Natsumi Matsumoto. It began serialization on September 3, 2008, in the October 2008 issue of Ribon. The series ended on June 3, 2011, with a total of 12 tankōbon volumes. The manga won the 56th Shogakukan Manga Awards in the Children's category.

The series was adapted into two anime television series by Pierrot and Studio Hibari. The series was licensed by Crunchyroll for online streaming with English subtitles. The anime has since been licensed by Maiden Japan.

== Plot ==
Yumeiro Pâtissière: Fourteen-year-old Ichigo Amano (her name means strawberry) is clumsy and does not have any talent except for eating sweets (specifically cakes). When she stumbles upon a Sweets Festival, she meets Henri-sensei who acknowledges her ability of taste and invites her to transfer to St. Marie Academy to become a pâtissière. Ichigo has trouble adjusting initially, but with the help of the 3 Sweets Princes (Makoto Kashino, Satsuki Hanabusa, and Sennosuke Andou) and the Sweets Spirits (Vanilla, Chocolat, Caramel, and Cafe), she gains the confidence and skill to work towards becoming a pâtissière. Throughout the entire anime is Ichigo and the Sweet Princes trying to win the Grand Prix, which allowed them to go to Paris. Throughout the competition, Ichigo has a lot of character change and she grows little by little. She realizes many things and her skills are improving rapidly.

Yumeiro Pâtissière Professional: Two years after studying in Paris, the sixteen-year-old Ichigo returns to Japan as a professional pâtissière. As soon as she returns, she finds Team Ichigo breaking up. The Sweets Princes, Hanabusa and Andou, take long absences from school to work for their dreams, leaving only Ichigo and Kashino. Kashino skipped a grade due to having top grades back at Paris. Soon a "new" Team Ichigo is formed by Henri-sensei for the project. The team includes Lemon Yamagishi, Johnny McBeal, Makoto Kashino, and Amano Ichigo. They are now working as professionals for the project and their dreams in St. Marie Garden.

== Characters ==
=== Main characters ===
Ichigo Amano (天野 いちご, Amano Ichigo)
Voiced by: Aoi Yūki
Ichigo is a young girl who is clumsy, naive, and innocent, but is also optimistic and lively. Her mother Mrs. Amano ignored her for many years because of her having no talent (compared to her younger sister Natsume, who is an aspiring pianist, and who generally excels at almost anything). Due to her incredible palate that allows her to immediately tell what ingredients are used in different sweets, and who made the ingredients, she is spotted by Henri Lucas during a "Sweets Festival". Following his suggestion she transfers to St.Marie Academy, in order to train to become a pâtissiere like her late grandmother. Ichigo is also known for her huge appetite for cakes, she claims there is a second stomach specifically for sweets, and has won several cake eating contests in the past. As the story progresses, Ichigo improves her talent as a pâtissiere, and gains new friends and rivals along the way. She wins the hearts of almost everyone due her hard work and unwavering love for pastries of highest quality. Her dream is to create sweets that make people smile. She initially had an innocent crush on Henri Lucas because of his princely looks and kindness. However, as the series progresses, she falls in love with Kashino, who ultimately returns her feelings.
At the end of the last episode of the first season of the anime, Ichigo and Kashino promise to tell each other about their feelings when they're accomplished patissiers. During the second season she is 16 years old, and a member of a new "Group A", consisting of herself, Lemon, Rumi, and Johnny McBeal. She is also a part of the Henri-sensei's project, "Marie's Garden", which includes Kashino, Lemon, and Johnny. In the very last episode of Yumeiro Patissiere SP Professional, Kashino tells her that he always wants to be able to make sweets with her, and accidentally kisses her.
Makoto Kashino (樫野 真, Kashino Makoto)
Voiced by: Nobuhiko Okamoto
One of the "Sweets Princes" of St.Marie's Academy who specializes in chocolate. Andou is his childhood friend and Hanabusa is his roommate. Kashino is sometimes teased or misjudged due to his height, for he is the shortest of the Sweets Princes. He comes from a prestigious family of doctors who do not approve of his career choice. Due to a condition that his family gave him before attending St.Marie, he is forced to be always at the top of his class. Kashino is generally unsociable, straightforward, easily angered, and prickly. He greatly admires his uncle (who is a chocolatier), and he spent a lot of time in his shop when he was little (which inspired him to become a pâtissier). Even though he is initially judgemental and sarcastic due to Ichigo's klutzy personality, he warms up to her to the point of being teammates and friends, and later falls in love with her. In episode 34 it is shown that Kashino has a drawing of Ichigo in his notebook.
In the second season, Kashino skipped a year in school because of his excellent grades during Team Ichigo's study abroad in Paris. He is now 16, but still conscious about his height, as Johnny regularly teases him for it. Whenever he sees Johnny holding Ichigo, he becomes visibly jealous (often smacking the back of Johnny's head). At the end of the series, he asks Ichigo if she will stay with him forever. And after that, he accidentally falls on top of her and kisses her.
Satsuki Hanabusa (花房 五月, Hanabusa Satsuki)
Voiced by: Tsubasa Yonaga
One of the "Sweets Princes" of the school, who specializes in candy sculptures and flower-based cakes. Hanabusa's dream is to work with his mother, who excels at Japanese flower arrangement, and is the flower arranging teacher at St.Marie Academy. His father was a horticulturist who specialized in roses, and who died in a car accident several years before the story takes place. The bottle of rose water Hanabusa keeps is a memento of his father. Since his father died, Hanabusa felt that he should be kind to his mother and women in general. As a result, Hanabusa always focused on roses and is extremely nice to all females (to the point of being a borderline perpetual flirt). He also seems narcissistic and heavily concerned about his appearance, at one point his Sweets Spirit Café implies that Hanabusa needs more than an hour to get ready for school in the morning. In Yumeiro Patissiere SP Professional, Hanabusa starts to work towards his dream, together with his mother, and takes an indefinite leave of absence from school. He admits that he is also in love with Ichigo, although he tells Kashino that he can have her (presumably to make Ichigo happy), but that if she ever dumps him he will claim her for himself.
Sennosuke Andou (安堂 千乃介, Andō Sennosuke)
Voiced by: Shinya Hamazoe
One of the "Sweets Princes" of the school who specializes in Japanese sweets. Andou's dream is to open his own shop that sells a blend of Eastern and Western sweets next door to his family's Japanese sweets shop, Yumezuki. Andou is the eldest of five siblings, and he often goes to help at his family's shop during holidays and weekends. He is a childhood friend of Kashino, calling him "Maa-chan" in the manga and "Ma-kun" in the anime. Andou is always calm, reliable, and tries to reason with everyone, acting somewhat like an older brother to Team Ichigo. Andou cares about Caramel like a little sister, and he is always overjoyed whenever Caramel does something nice for him. He looks out for Ichigo and tends to worry about her a lot. In the second season, Andou is working towards his dream and takes a leave of absence from school, opening a branch of his family's Yumezuki on the international street of Henri-sensei's project. In Episode 11 of season two, he admits that he's in love with Ichigo, but he gives her up for Kashino. Hanabusa claims that the reason behind it was because he was already dating a girl named Kana.

=== Sweets Spirits ===
Vanilla (バニラ, Banira)
Voiced by: Ayana Taketatsu
Ichigo's sweets spirit who specializes in vanilla. Often labeled as Spartan, Vanilla's attitude is quite fiery. She generally fights with Chocolat, though they don't seem to actually hate each other, and in fact they work together in the manga for a Sweets Kingdom test. She is often called pudgy. Ichigo and Vanilla consider each other to be best friends, and are extremely loyal to each other. Vanilla often plays a big part in cheering Ichigo up whenever she feels discouraged. Her sweets magic is decorating plates, shrinking people to the size of a sweets spirit, filling an entire room with a pastry's scent and translating Sweets Spirit language into Japanese.
Chocolat (ショコラ, Shokora)
Voiced by: Yuri Yamaoka
Kashino's sweets spirit who is skilled in chocolate. Chocolat has a competitive spirit but is easily frightened. She is a classic example of a tsundere character, though it seems that she is somewhat losing this trait as the series progresses. Although she appears to dislike Ichigo, she actually cares for her and helps her whenever needed. She may not look like it, but she cares for Kashino and considers the pair as a "married couple". In season two, it shows that she cares deeply about a sweets spirit named Kasshi and may have romantic feelings for him. For example, in one of the episodes, Chocolat goes to the Sweets Kingdom to help out the 'Jerks', but gets Kashino and Kasshi mixed up. When she tries to 'express' the connection she has with Kashino, she ends up clinging to Kasshi, while Vanilla is saying that she clung onto Kasshi on purpose, while Chocolat Tries to deny it.
Caramel (キャラメル, Kyarameru)
Voiced by: Mayu Iino
Andou's sweets spirit who is useful with caramel. Although Caramel is the eldest out of Team Ichigo's Sweets Spirits, she is clumsy like Ichigo and tends to cry a lot. She commonly ends her sentences with desu. Café states that she has a terrible sense of direction. She considers Andou to be her big brother. Her sweets magic allows her to make pastry pictures to show someone how the sweets look like.
Café (カフェ, Kafe)
Voiced by: Sachika Misawa
Hanabusa's sweets spirit who is good with coffee. Café is polite, smart, and very calm. He looks up to Hanabusa and sees him as his senpai. Café can make extremely bitter coffee as a potent way of making Team Ichigo more awake.
Honey (ハニー, Hani)
Voiced by: Eri Kitamura
Mari's sweet spirit who specializes in honey. She is mature, cool, and calm. Even though her expression is always serious, she is very friendly and kind to everyone. The Jerks call her Honey-Pig, much to her disgust. She is very well respected among the sweets spirits, with many of who call her Honey-sama. It is hinted she may be a princess. She is also able to sense someone's feeling.
Marron (マロン, Maron)
Voiced by: Sayuri Yahagi
Miya's sweets spirit who is useful with chestnuts. She tends to be a bit rude and arrogant. Although Marron and Miya are noted to have similar personalities, they deny that fact due to Marron being against Miya at times. Her name means "chestnut" or "brown" in French.
Mint (ミント, Minto)
Voiced by: Yui Ogura
Lemon's sweets spirit who specializes in mint. Like Lemon, Mint admires Vanilla, ending her name with senpai. She is said to be the youngest of the new Team Ichigo's Spirits at the age of 150. Mint usually ends her sentence with "deshi".
Maize (メイズ, Meizu)
Voiced by: Minori Chihara
Johnny's sweets spirit who specializes in deep-fried sweets. She is strong-willed enough to have anyone bow down to her. Maize is very polite, but can also be very strict, especially when thinking that someone is being rude. She has enough power to burn people to a crisp. Maize is not very good at Japanese, generally using incorrect Japanese and dropping random English words into her sentences. She only appears in the second series.
Marjoram (マジョラム, Majoramu)
Voiced by: Kaoru Katakai
The sweets spirit of Ichigo's grandmother and the former director of the Sweet Spirits Museum. On New Year's, Ichigo goes to the Sweet Kingdom for the first time. After meeting the troublesome trio, The Jerks, she follows Kasshi when spotting him in town. Ichigo gets lost is the mysterious forest and meets Marjoram for the first time. Marjoram helps Ichigo find for way to The Jerk's hide away and gives Ichigo an old spoon that serves a later purpose. While Ichigo is in the Grand Prix, she wants to know her grandmother's special strawberry tart recipe that always made her smile. When she breaks into the museum to find it, she gets caught and meets Marjoram once again. There, Ichigo finds out that Marjoram is her grandmother's Sweets Spirit and tells her that she wants to see her grandmother's recipe again.
Kashi (かし, Kashi)
Voiced by: Nobuhiko Okamoto
The sweet spirit equivalent to Kashino. His mom runs a farm in which he can use any of her ingredients. Chocolat likes Kashi in a romantic sense.
Orange (オレンジ, Orenji)
Voiced by: Emiri Katou
Peach (ピーチ, Pīchi)
Voiced by: Natsuko Kuwatani
Narcy (ナルシー, Narushī)
Basil (バジル, Bajiru)
Cinnamon (シナモン, Shinamon)
Estragon (エストラゴン, Esutoragon)
Voiced by: Kaori Ishihara
Sugar (シュガー, Shugā)
Cherry (チェリー, Cherī)
Black Cherry (ブラックチェリー, Burakkucherī)
Almond (アマンド, Amando)
Queen of the Sweets Kingdom (スイーツ王国の女王)
Voiced by: Kikuko Inoue
The unnamed queen of the Sweets Kingdom. When first introduced, she is seen collecting Sweets Cards from the desserts that the Sweet Spirits make with their human friends. In the manga, Marie and the queen are both named Marie, in fact, sharing the same name is what started their friendship and eventually started the whole partnership system between humans and Sweets Spirits.

=== Supporting characters ===
Henri Lucas (アンリ・リュカス, Anri Ryukasu)
Voiced by: Daisuke Kishio
The great grandchild of Marie Lucas who created St. Marie Academy to raise patissiers. Due to unknown circumstances, he transferred to Paris to teach at the main campus right before Ichigo moved to the Japanese St. Marie campus. He is known as a "master of sweets," and a "master of dance." Henri is characterized as calm, collected, and a handsome gentleman. But shows his true colors when Mari loses in the Grand Prix, though he shows great interest in Ichigo and Tennouji as pâtissieres and seems to favor both of them among all his students. Henri wants to do the same thing by training Ichigo like his grandfather did to Ichigo's grandmother. During the Grand Prix, he acts like a bad guy on purpose to show Ichigo that she has the power to become a great patissiere and surpass her grandmother. In season 2 in episode 10, he is cruel to Mari, saying that he should use somebody else to run her shop, but by the end of the episode it is revealed he only said those things to try and encourage her, he wanted to see if she had the courage to continue her shop.
Mari Tennouji (天王寺麻里, Tennouji Mari)
Voiced by: Eri Kitamura
One of Henri Lucas' favorite students. She is the daughter of a hotel owner and the Student Council President of the Japanese St. Marie campus. Mari is often referred as the "Princess" of St. Marie Academy. She is known as a genius when it comes to pastry. Though she has been given many awards for her excellent work, she has stated that all of her medals and trophies are meaningless compared to the attention she wants from Henri Lucas. Mari constantly works very hard to improve her skills, regardless of her being the St. Marie Academy's top student. In the anime version of the semi-finals of the Cake Grand Prix, she lost to Team Francois because of the "show" Henri- "sensei" put on to test her. But after that test, she began to start new in SP Professional, she has cut her hair and currently lives in New York to help Henri-sensei's with a shop. Her sweets spirit is Honey, who is well respected like she is.
Miya Koshiro (小城美夜, Koshiro Miya)
Voiced by: Sayuri Yahagi
Known as "Heiress" by other students, Miya is the daughter of the president of the famed "Château Seika" company which specializes in creating and delivering chocolates and other sweets. She is very determined to get whatever she desires and as such, whenever she is in a pinch she relies heavily on her family's power and wealth to get what she wants (e.g. she bought the Andorra campus of St. Marie in order to compete in the World Cake Grand Prix). She has a habit of ordering the highest quality ingredients in order to get an edge on her competition. She has an obsessive crush on Kashino, to the point where she has memorabilia of him and has constant dreams about him. Her sweets spirit is Marron.
Rumi Kato (加藤ルミ, Katō Rumi)
Voiced by: Asumi Kodama
One of the members of Group C and Ichigo's roommate/best friend at St. Marie Academy. Rumi speaks in an Osaka dialect and has a long distance boyfriend named Takuya. She always sticks up for Ichigo when she is bullied and cheers Ichigo's team on in the Cake Grand Prix. In the second season, Rumi is in the A group together with Ichigo, Lemon, and Johnny.
Lemon Yamagishi (山岸レモン, Yamagishi Remon)
Voiced by: Mariya Ise
A student from the main St. Marie campus in Paris who challenges Team Ichigo early on in the Cake Grand Prix. She later learns to be humble from Ichigo and returns to Paris. In the second season, she transfers to Japan and joins the new Team Ichigo to work on Henri's project. She skipped a year for having top grades and is in Group A with Ichigo, Rumi, and Johnny. She admires Ichigo and looks up to her. Mint is her sweets spirit.
Johnny McBeal (ジョニーマクビール, Jonī Makubīru)
Voiced by: Akio Suyama
Being only character (besides his sweets spirit, Maize) to appear in the second season, Johnny is one of the members in group A with Ichigo, though he prefers to work independently. He is a transfer student from America and Miya Koshiro's cousin. His dream is to create a sweet that originates from America since there are few that actually originate from the country. When he meets Ichigo, he quickly falls in love with her and becomes jealous of Kashino, commenting that he wished she "could talk about him with sparkling eyes, in the same way she does when talking of Kashino." He is part of Henri Lucas' project, working with Lemon, Ichigo, and Kashino.
Kanako Koizumi (小泉かなこ, Koizumi Kanako)
Voiced by: Satomi Satou
She is originally in C Group with Rumi Kato, and in Season Two becomes a server and Patisserie at the Marie's Garden branch of Yumetsuki. Kana is very sweet, cheerful and rather quiet compared to her best friend, Rumi; she's also shown to be a bit of a crybaby; While weaker and unsure of herself in the first season, by Season Two she is able to stand up for herself against her crush Sennosuke Andou when he insists on taking everything on himself. She becomes friends with Ichigo Amano when Ichigo does her best to make a cake for her little sister, Ringo. She can frequently be seen with Rumi, cheering for Team Ichigo from the stands all through the Grand Prix.
Miki Mori (森 ミキ, Mori Miki)
Voiced by: Sachika Misawa
A classmate and friend of Ichigo and Rumi. She has short dark green hair.
Sayuri Kanda (神田 さゆり)
Voiced by: Yuri Yamaoka
Another classmate and friend of Ichigo and Rumi. She has short ear length blonde hair.
Ikue Nakajima (中島 いくえ, Nakajima Ikue)
Voiced by: Yoriko Nagata
Youko Ayukawa (鮎川 ようこ, Ayukawa Youko)
Voiced by: Nozomi Sasaki
Youko Ayukawa is a female student with short navy blue hair in Group B but also works as a spy for Miya Koshiro. She is also in Team Koshiro and mainly picks on Ichigo.
Chinatsu Sayama (狭山 千夏, Sayama Chinatsu)
Voiced by: Airi Sakuno
Mantarou Kujou (九条 万太郎, Kujou Mantarou)
Voiced by: Yoshinori Fujita
Natsuki Aragaki (新垣 夏希, Aragaki Natsuki)
Voiced by: Emiri Katou
Nicholas Hayashi (林 ニコラス, Hayashi Nicholas)
Voiced by: Taishi Murata
Kenichi Morino (森野 ケンイチ, Morino Kenichi)
Voiced by: Rina Ichikawa
Satou (佐藤)
Voiced by: Takashi Oohara
Shiotani (塩谷)
Voiced by: Takamasa Mogi
Noriko Ameya (飴屋乃梨子, Ameya Noriko)
Voiced by: Mai Toudou
A cooking teacher at St. Marie's boarding school.
Mr. Karashima (辛島 先生, Karashima-sensei)
Voiced by: Daisuke Endou
A homeroom teacher at St Marie's boarding school.
Yayoi Hanabusa (花房 弥生, Hanabusa Yayoi)
Voiced by: Yuikiko Takaguchi
Satsuki's mother and an instructor in flower arrangement at St. Marie's boarding school.
Rie Mihara (三原 りえ, Mihara Rie)
Voiced by: Erika
Yomogi (よもぎ)
Voiced by: Ami Nanase
Erika Hayami (早見 エリカ, Hayami Erika)
Voiced by: Aya Uchida
Azuki Tachibana (立花 あずき, Tachibana Azuki)
Voiced by: Ayumi Fujimura
Nakamura (中村)
Voiced by: Yuusuke Nakamura
Mika Chinen (知念 美果, Chinen Mika)
Voiced by: Natsuko Kuwatani
Ricardo Benigni (リカルド・ベニネ, Rikarudo Benīni)
Voiced by: Tomokazu Sugita
Ryou Saeki (冴木 亮, Saeki Ryou)

=== Family members ===
Ichita Andou (安藤 一太, Andou Ichita)
Voiced by: Riko Hirai
A first grade student, Sennosuke's younger brother and the second oldest of his younger siblings. He originally did not like cake because his older brother left the family to fulfill his dreams and believing that Sennosuke enjoyed baking pastries rather than having a good sibling relationship; after Ichigo baked a Matcha roll cake for him, he started enjoying cakes again in the process he reconciled with Sennosuke by tearfully embracing him. In episode 4 he nicknamed Ichigo "Cake Pig".
Natsume Amano (天野 なつめ (棗), Amano Natsume)
Voiced by: Mariko Mizuno
A third grade student and is Ichigo's younger sister, before her sister left for boarding school she and Ichigo always had a sibling rivalry with each other, but the two start to get along after Ichigo pays her family a visit. She has a talent for playing the piano.
Momoe Andou (安藤 百絵, Andou Momoe)
Voiced by: Erika
Masayo Andou (安藤 万佐代, Andou Masayo)
Voiced by: Airi Sakuno
Kyouko Amano (天野 杏子, Amano Kyouko)
Voiced by: Saori Seto
Shigeru Amano (天野 しげる, Amano Shigeru)
Voiced by: Takashi Oohara
Michiko Amano (天野 ミチコ, Amano Michiko)
Voiced by: Tamie Kubota
Rei Kashino (樫野 麗, Kashino Rei)
Voiced by: Kaoru Katakai
Miyabi Kashino (樫野 雅, Kashino Miyabi)
Voiced by: Kaori Nazuka
Hikaru Amano (天野 ヒカル, Amano Hikaru)
Voiced by: Takamasa Mogi
Mr. Hanabusa (花房さん, Hanabusa-san)
Voiced by: Hikaru Midorikawa

== Media ==
=== Manga ===
Written and drawn by Natsumi Matsumoto, the Yumeiro Patissiere manga began serialization in Shueisha's shōjo manga magazine Ribon on September 3, 2008, in the October issue of the magazine. Each chapter is called a "recette" (French for recipe); The series ended on June 3, 2011, and is 12 volumes total. In 2026, the series became licensed digitally in English on Shueisha's Manga Million platform. The series is licensed by Sharp Point Press in Taiwan.

No.	Japanese release date	Japanese ISBN
01	December 15, 2008	978-4-08-856860-7
Recette 1-3
02	April 15, 2009	978-4-08-856882-9
Recette 4-7
03	August 15, 2009	978-4-08-867010-2
Recette 8-11
04	November 13, 2009	978-4-08-867020-1
Recette 12-14
05	February 4, 2010	978-4-08-867036-2
Recette 15-17
06	May 14, 2010	978-4-08-867053-9
Recette 18 – 20
07	August 12, 2010	978-4-08-867069-0
08	December 15, 2010	978-4-08-867088-1
09	May 13, 2011	978-4-08-867119-2
10	October 14, 2011	978-4-08-867145-1
11	March 15, 2013	978-4-08-867258-8
12	September 13, 2013	978-4-08-867291-5

=== Anime ===
The anime adaptation was accidentally announced in June 2009 by a listing from one of the card game series based on the manga. The series began airing on October 4, 2009, on Yomiuri TV. The series was simulcasted on Crunchyroll with English subtitles. The sweets in the series were all created by the Paris-based patissier Aoki Sadaharu. A one episode side story, title Yumeiro Pâtissière Mune Kyun Tropical Island! (夢色パティシエール 胸キュントロピカルアイランド!, Yumeiro Pâtissière: Heart-Racing Tropical Island!) was shown at the "Natsu Doki– Ribon–kko Party 5" event for Ribon magazine in the summer of 2010. The episode was included on a DVD with the November issue of Ribon. A second series, taking place two years later than the first, began airing on October 3, 2010. The second season is entitled Yumeiro Pâtissière SP Professional and introduces new characters.

In March 2026, it was announced that both seasons of this series would make their debut on the HIDIVE platform, on March 24, 2026.

=== Music ===
The first season of the anime series uses two pieces of theme music, one opening and one closing. The opening is Yume ni Yell! Patissiere (夢にエール!パティシエール♪, Yell For the Dream! Patissiere) and the ending is Ichigo no Mirakurūru (いちごのミラクルール, Ichigo's Miracle–le). The CD single for the two was released by the Columbia Music Entertainment on January 20, 2010, in a regular and limited edition. The limited edition comes with extra charms and costs ¥1,365, but is otherwise the same as the regular edition, which costs ¥1,050. A soundtrack for the series was released on April 21, 2010, entitled Yumeiro Patissiere KiraKira ☆ Myūjikku (夢色パティシエール きらきら☆ミュージック, Yumeiro Patissiere SparkleSparkle ☆ Music).

=== Video game ===
A Nintendo DS game based on the series was released on May 27, 2010. The game is entitled Yumeiro Patissiere: My Sweet Cooking (夢色パティシエールマイスイーツクッキング, Yumeiro Patishiēru Mai Suītsu Kukkingu) and was released by Konami.

=== Card game ===
A trading card game based on the manga was released in Japan by Konami during the serialization of the series. There are two different series, Sweets Deco Cards and My Sweets Cards.

=== Cookbook ===
A cookbook for the series entitled "Yumeiro Patissiere Special Recipe Book: Oyako de Tsukuru Hajimete no Sweets" (夢色パティシエール スペシャルレシピブック 親子で作るはじめてのスイーツ) (ISBN 978-4-08-102082-9) was released by Shueisha on December 1, 2009, for ¥1200.

== Reception ==
Carlo Santos of Anime News Network calls the anime "a baking-themed series so rife with clichés that it's hard to tell where the plagiarism stops and the actual show begins." Other reviewers on the same site had slightly better opinions of the series though. Carl Kimlinger calls it "pure shōjo fluff" and says that it is a "sugary little distraction that won't harm any sensibilities." Theron Martin suggests either eating before or during viewing as the series is "undoubtedly one of the tastiest-looking series to come along in quite some time." Martin critiqued the art of the series however, saying "The dessert designs are unquestionably the visual highlight, as otherwise the artistry and technical merits are rather bland." Summer Mullins also notes that the sweets are the best part of the animation, saying, "those detailed shots [of the sweets] highlight the fact that some of the animation is only so-so". As of May 11, 2010, Crunchyroll's website listed Yumeiro Patissiere with an overall ranking of 4.8 out of 5 stars, with a total of 1761 votes.

The manga received the Shogakukan Manga Award for best children's manga of 2010.
