= Classroom of the Elite season 4 =

2026 Japanese anime series

Classroom of the Elite
- Season 4
- No. of episodes: 16

Release
- Original network: AT-X
- Original release: April 1 – June 24, 2026

Season chronology
- ← Previous; Season 3

Classroom of the Elite is an anime television series based on the light novel series of the same name written by Shōgo Kinugasa and illustrated by Shunsaku Tomose. The fourth season of the series, covering the first semester of the Year 2 sequel light novel series, was announced during the "MF Bunko J Natsu no Gakuensai 2024" livestream event on September 1, 2024. It is produced by Lerche and directed by Noriyuki Nomata, with the rest of the staff and cast reprising their roles. The season premiered on April 1, 2026. The fourth season's opening theme song is "Monster", performed by Eir Aoi, and the ending theme song is "Liar Veil" (ライアーヴェール), performed by ZAQ.

== Episodes ==
No. overall	No. in season	Title (Note: All English titles are taken from Crunchyroll.)	Directed by	Written by	Storyboarded by	Original release date
39	1	"Assassin From the White Room" (Note: Sicarii ex Camera Alba); Transliteration: "Howaito Rūmu Kara no Shikaku" (Japanese: ホワイトルームからの刺客)	Yū Kinome	Yasushi Shigenobu	Noriyuki Nogi & Wataru Matsumi	April 1, 2026
40	2	"Contract and Payment (Note: Contractus et Praemium)"; Transliteration: "Keiyaku to Daishō" (Japanese: 契約と代償)	Yū Kinome	Yasushi Shigenobu	Yō Nakano & Yū Kinome	April 1, 2026
41	3	"Determination of a Leader (Note: Dux Votorum Virtutis)"; Transliteration: "Rīdā taru Kakugo" (Japanese: リーダーたる覚悟)	Mako Shiina	Yasushi Shigenobu	Noriyo Sasaki	April 1, 2026
42	4	"To Whom the Blade Turns (Note: Quis Gladio affici Potest)"; Transliteration: "Yaiba o muku Saki" (Japanese: 刃を向く先)	Noriyuki Nogi	Yasushi Shigenobu	Masaki Kitamura	April 1, 2026
43	5	"The Twenty-Million Man (Note: Vir Aestimationis Viginti milionum)" Transliteration: "Nisenman no Otoko" (Japanese: 2000万の男)	Hiromi Takenouchi	Yasushi Shigenobu	Daisuke Nakajima	April 8, 2026
44	6	"A Tumultuous Scramble (Note: Certamen Tumultuosum ad Suadendum)"; Transliteration: "Haran no sōdatsu sen" (Japanese: 波乱の争奪戦)	Lisa Notaro, Yūka Tsuda, Mako Shiina & Noriyuki Nogi	Kyōko Katsuya	Noriyo Sasaki	April 15, 2026
45	7	"Plotting (Note: Consilium Dolosum)"; Transliteration: "An'yaku" (Japanese: 暗躍)	Mako Shiina, Yūka Tsuda; Lisa Notaro & Noriyuki Nogi	Yasushi Shigenobu	Noriaki Saito	April 22, 2026
46	8	"The Subject of the Dragon's Gaze (Note: Magna Ambitio Draconum)"; Transliteration: "Ryū-tachi no mitsumeru mono" (Japanese: 龍たちの見つめるもの)	Koichiro Takatsu	Yasushi Shigenobu	Daisuke Nakajima	April 29, 2026
47	9	"A Disquieting Beginning (Note: Initium Ominosum)"; Transliteration: "Fuon naru kaimaku" (Japanese: 不穏なる開幕)	Mako Shiina, Lisa Notaro, Yūka Tsuda & Noriyuki Nogi	Kyōko Katsuya	Noriaki Saito	May 6, 2026
48	10	"Love Uncommunicated (Note: Amor Ineffabilis)"; Transliteration: "Todokanu Omoi" (Japanese: 届かぬ想い)	Ken Yoshino, Yūka Tsuda, Mako Shiina, Lisa Notaro & Noriyuki Nogi	Yasushi Shigenobu	Hatsumida Shiyo	May 13, 2026
49	11	"Connection (Note: Nexus)"; Transliteration: "Enishi" (Japanese: 縁(えにし))	Mako Shiina, Atsuko Tononizu & Noriyuki Nogi	Kyōko Katsuya	Noriaki Saito	May 20, 2026
50	12	"After Vengeance (Note: Finis Vicissitudines Vindictae)"; Transliteration: "Onshū no hate ni" (Japanese: 怨讐の果てに)	Yuuki Nagasawa & Noriyuki Nogi	Yasushi Shigenobu	Daisuke Nakajima	May 27, 2026
51	13	"Obscured By the Rain (Note: Pluvia Futura Celat)"; Transliteration: "Ame ni kemuru" (Japanese: 雨に煙る)	Lisa Notaro, Ken Yoshino, Yūka Tsuda & Mako Shiina	Kyōko Katsuya	Yū Kinome	June 3, 2026
52	14	"The Extraordinary Prodigy (Note: Prodigium Eximium)"; Transliteration: "Kokō no Kirinji" (Japanese: 孤高の麒麟児)	Yuuki Nagasawa & Noriyuki Nogi	Yasushi Shigenobu	Kosei Satō	June 10, 2026
53	15	"Power and Will (Note: Vis et Voluntas)"; Transliteration: "Chikara to Ishi" (Japanese: 力と意志)	Ken Yoshino & Noriyuki Nogi	Kyōko Katsuya	Noriaki Saito	June 17, 2026
54	16	"For a Desired Future (Note: Pro Desiderato Futuro)"; Transliteration: "Aru Mirai no Tame ni" (Japanese: ある未来のために)	Noriyuki Nogi	Yasushi Shigenobu	Hatsumida Shiyo & Hatsuki Tsuji	June 24, 2026
