= Mayu Iino =

Japanese voice actress and child actress

- 飯野 茉優
- Born: May 23, 1999 (age 27); Saitama Prefecture, Japan
- Occupations: Voice actress; child actress
- Years active: 2008-present

Mayu Ino (飯野 茉優, Iino Mayu; born May 23, 1999) is a Japanese voice actress and child actress from Saitama Prefecture, Japan.

As of 2016, she has indefinite hiatus.

== Filmography ==
=== Anime ===
2008

- Michiko to Hatchin (Marisa (episode 5))

2009

- Yumeiro Patissiere (Caramel)

2010

- Shiki (Shizuka Matsuo)
- Yumeiro Patissiere SP Professional (Caramel)

2011

- Bunny Drop (Sayaka (episodes 9-11))

2012

- Jormungand (Malka (episode 5))
- Jormungand: Perfect Order (Malka)

2014

- Mushi-Shi -Next Passage- (Mizuho)

2023

- Zenryoku Usagi (Mikuro-san)

=== Theatrical animation ===
- The Disappearance of Haruhi Suzumiya (Girl)
- Welcome to the Space Show (Ink)
- The Wind Rises (Naoko Satomi (young))

=== Dubbing roles ===
- Oz the Great and Powerful (China Girl (Joey King))
- Space Buddies (Rosebud (Liliana Mumy))
