= Classroom of the Elite =

Japanese light novel series by Shōgo Kinugasa

- First light novel volume cover, featuring Suzune Horikita (left) and Kiyotaka Ayanokoji (right)

ようこそ実力至上主義の教室へ (Yōkoso Jitsuryoku Shijōshugi no Kyōshitsu e)
- Genre: Psychological thriller
- Light novel
- Written by: Shōgo Kinugasa
- Illustrated by: Shunsaku Tomose
- Published by: Media Factory
- English publisher: NA: Seven Seas Entertainment
- Imprint: MF Bunko J
- Original run: May 25, 2015 – September 25, 2019
- Volumes: 11 (Note: Fourteen light novels in total have been released including three short story collections.)
- Manga
- Written by: Shōgo Kinugasa
- Illustrated by: Yuyu Ichino
- Published by: Media Factory
- English publisher: NA: Seven Seas Entertainment
- Magazine: Monthly Comic Alive
- Original run: January 27, 2016 – present
- Volumes: 12
- Manga

Classroom of the Elite: Horikita
- Written by: Shōgo Kinugasa
- Illustrated by: Sakagaki
- Published by: Media Factory
- English publisher: NA: Seven Seas Entertainment
- Magazine: Monthly Comic Alive
- Original run: June 27, 2017 – May 26, 2018
- Volumes: 2
- Light novel

Classroom of the Elite: Year 2
- Written by: Shōgo Kinugasa
- Illustrated by: Shunsaku Tomose
- Published by: Media Factory
- English publisher: NA: Seven Seas Entertainment
- Imprint: MF Bunko J
- Original run: January 24, 2020 – November 25, 2024
- Volumes: 12 (Note: Fifteen light novels in total have been released including three short story collections.)
- Manga

Classroom of the Elite: Year 2
- Written by: Shōgo Kinugasa
- Illustrated by: Shia Sasane
- Published by: Media Factory
- Magazine: Monthly Comic Alive
- Original run: December 25, 2021 – December 26, 2024
- Volumes: 4
- Light novel

Classroom of the Elite: Year 3
- Written by: Shōgo Kinugasa
- Illustrated by: Shunsaku Tomose
- Published by: Media Factory
- English publisher: NA: Seven Seas Entertainment
- Imprint: MF Bunko J
- Original run: March 24, 2025 – present
- Volumes: 5
- Manga

Classroom of the Elite: Year 2 2nd Stage
- Written by: Shōgo Kinugasa
- Illustrated by: Hachi Komada
- Published by: Media Factory
- Magazine: Monthly Comic Alive
- Original run: January 27, 2025 – present
- Volumes: 2
- Anime television series
- Classroom of the Elite (2017–present)
- icon

Classroom of the Elite (Japanese: ようこそ実力至上主義の教室へ, Hepburn: Yōkoso Jitsuryoku Shijōshugi no Kyōshitsu e; lit. 'Welcome to the Classroom of Real Ability Supremacism'), abbreviated as Yōjitsu (よう実) in Japan, is a Japanese light novel series written by Shōgo Kinugasa, with illustrations by Shunsaku Tomose. The series is published under Media Factory's MF Bunko J imprint, with Classroom of the Elite: Year 1 published from May 2015 to September 2019; followed by its sequel Classroom of the Elite: Year 2 (ようこそ実力至上主義の教室へ 2年生編, Yōkoso Jitsuryoku Shijōshugi no Kyōshitsu e Ninensei-hen; lit. 'Welcome to the Classroom of Real Ability Supremacism Second-Year Students Edition') published from January 2020 to November 2024, as well as the follow-up Classroom of the Elite: Year 3 (ようこそ実力至上主義の教室へ 3年生編, Yōkoso Jitsuryoku Shijōshugi no Kyōshitsu e Sannensei-hen; lit. 'Welcome to the Classroom of Real Ability Supremacism Third-Year Students Edition'), which began publishing in March 2025.

Set in the prestigious elite national high school 'Tokyo Metropolitan Advanced Nurturing School' established by the Japanese government, the story is about students assigned to four classes in the hierarchical order of 'A' 'B' 'C' and 'D', who are in constant competition over their three years of schooling to decide which gets to ultimately graduate in 'Class A', whose graduating members are said to be promised automatic acceptance in any desired career path or further education.

A manga adaptation by Yuyu Ichino began its serialization in Media Factory's Monthly Comic Alive on January 27, 2016. A manga adaptation of the sequel light novel series illustrated by Shia Sasane began serialization in the same magazine in December 2021. An anime television series adaptation produced by Lerche aired from July to September 2017, with the second season aired in July to September 2022, and the third season aired from January to March 2024. A fourth season aired from April to June 2026, and a fifth season is set to premiere in 2027.

The series has received widespread universal acclaim for its writing and darker themes, and has sold over 10.8 million copies in circulation, as one of the best-selling light novels.

== Plot ==
The Japanese government has established the Tokyo Metropolitan Advanced Nurturing School, dedicated to instruct and foster the generation of people that will support the country in the future. The students are given a high degree of freedom in order to closely mimic real life. The story follows the perspective of Kiyotaka Ayanokōji, a quiet and modest boy, who is bad at making friends and would rather keep his distance, but possesses unrivaled intelligence and incredible physical ability. He is a student of Class 'D', which is where the school dumps its inferior students, widely considered "defective". After meeting Suzune Horikita and Kikyō Kushida, two other students in his class, the situation begins to change, and he gets involved in many affairs and his thought of an ideal normal high school life is disrupted.

== Media ==
=== Light novels ===
==== Classroom of the Elite ====
Written by Shōgo Kinugasa and illustrated by Shunsaku Tomose, the series is published by Media Factory, which published eleven volumes, along with three short story volumes from May 25, 2015, to September 25, 2019, under the MF Bunko J imprint. Seven Seas Entertainment has licensed the series. On February 17, 2021, Seven Seas announced it released a new version of volume seven, due to the localization decisions in the original omitting several paragraphs.

No.	Original release date	Original ISBN	English release date	English ISBN
1	May 25, 2015	978-4-04-067657-9	February 7, 2019 (digital); May 7, 2019 (physical)	978-1-64-275137-6
Chapter 1: The Structure of Japanese Society; Chapter 2: Welcome to the School Life of Your Dreams; Chapter 3: The Students of Class D; Chapter 4: Ladies and Gentlemen, Thank You for Waiting; Chapter 5: Friends; Chapter 6: The End of Everyday Life; Chapter 7: Classroom of the Elite; Chapter 8: The Association of Failures; Chapter 9: The Failures Mobilize Once Again; Chapter 10: Midterm Exam; Chapter 11: The Beginning; Chapter 12: Victory Celebration
2	September 25, 2015	978-4-04-067778-1	May 16, 2019 (digital); August 13, 2019 (physical)	978-1-64-275139-0
Chapter 1: Sakura Airi's Soliloquy; Chapter 2: The Sudden Beginning of Our Tumultuous Troubles; Chapter 3: Weak Point; Chapter 4: An Unexpected Witness; Chapter 5: Each and Every Prediction; Chapter 6: Truth and Lies; Chapter 7: Only One Solution
3	January 25, 2016	978-4-04-068008-8	July 18, 2019 (digital); November 19, 2019 (physical)	978-1-64-275723-1
Chapter 1: Chabashira Sae's Soliloquy; Chapter 2: The Boundary Between Heaven and Hell; Chapter 3: Rivals on the Move; Chapter 4: The Meaning of Freedom; Chapter 5: The Quiet Outbreak of War; Chapter 6: False Teamwork; Chapter 7: The Curtain Rises
4	May 25, 2016	978-4-04-068338-6	November 21, 2019 (digital); February 25, 2020 (physical)	978-1-64-505197-8
Chapter 1: Karuizawa Kei's Soliloquy; Chapter 2: The Gentle Days...; Chapter 3: An Infinite Variety of Wishes; Chapter 4: Double Question; Chapter 5: Each and Every Difference
4.5	September 23, 2016	978-4-04-068629-5	February 6, 2020 (digital); June 16, 2020 (physical)	978-1-64-505437-5
Chapter 1: Summer Vacation is Nearly Over; Chapter 2: Ibuki Mio has Surprisingly Good Sense; Chapter 3: Katsuragi Kōhei is Surprisingly Troubled; Chapter 4: Dangers Lurk in Everyday Life; Chapter 5: A Day of Girl Troubles and Disaster: A Devil Smiles Like an Angel; Chapter 6: A Gathering Between Classes; Chapter 7: Ike, Yamauchi, and Sudou's Summer Vacation (Extra Stories)
5	January 25, 2017	978-4-04-069017-9	May 14, 2020 (digital); July 21, 2020 (physical)	978-1-64-505486-3
Chapter 1: Sudō Ken's Soliloquy; Chapter 2: The School Sports Festival Begins; Chapter 3: Class D's Objective; Chapter 4: Everyone's Calculations; Chapter 5: There's a Reason for Their Relationship; Chapter 6: The Curtains Rise; Chapter 7: For Whose Sake?; Chapter 8: What You and I Lack; Chapter 9: The Turning Point
6	May 25, 2017	978-4-04-069231-9	July 23, 2020 (digital); October 13, 2020 (physical)	978-1-64-505751-2
Chapter 1: Kushida Kikyo's Soliloquy; Chapter 2: The Changing Class D; Chapter 3: The Paper Shuffle; Chapter 4: Class C Makes Its Move; Chapter 5: A Means of Escape; Chapter 6: The Ayanokouji Group's Formation; Chapter 7: A Difference in Determination
7	October 25, 2017	978-4-04-069458-0	October 29, 2020 (digital); January 19, 2021 (physical)	978-1-64-505820-5
Chapter 1: Ryūen Kakeru's Soliloquy; Chapter 2: The Sound of Footsteps in the Middle of Winter; Chapter 3: Reunions and Farewells; Chapter 4: Insanity; Chapter 5: Time to Settle Things; Chapter 6: Intersecting Thoughts; Chapter 7: What Ryūen Wins and Loses
7.5	January 25, 2018	978-4-04-069675-1	February 4, 2021 (digital); March 23, 2021 (physical)	978-1-64-505975-2
Chapter 1: First Winter; Chapter 2: Love's Arrow; Chapter 3: Ibuki Mio's Disastrous Day; Chapter 4: How We Spend Our Time; Chapter 5: The Turbulent Double Date; Chapter 6: Where the Arrow Landed
8	May 25, 2018	978-4-04-069861-8	May 27, 2021 (digital); June 22, 2021 (physical)	978-1-64-827223-3
Chapter 1: Horikita Manabu's Soliloquy; Chapter 2: A New Special Exam: Mixed Training Camp; Chapter 3: Human Nature Put to the Test; Chapter 4: A Premonition of Defeat; Chapter 5: The First Half of the Girls' Battle: Ichinose Honami; Chapter 6: Ubiquitous Things; Chapter 7: What Is Lost, What Isn't; Chapter 8: The Second Half of the Girls' Battle: Horikita Suzune; Chapter 9: Blind Spot
9	September 25, 2018	978-4-04-065157-6	August 26, 2021 (digital); September 28, 2021 (physical)	978-1-64-827261-5
Chapter 1: Ichinose Honami's Soliloquy; Chapter 2: The Student Council President's Inclination; Chapter 3: Changing Relationships; Chapter 4: Unchanging Intent; Chapter 5: Ichinose's Secret, Kamuro's Secret; Chapter 6: Rumors Running Rampant; Chapter 7: Ambiguous Things; Chapter 8: All the Tricks; Chapter 9: Return
10	January 25, 2019	978-4-04-065506-2	February 17, 2022 (digital); March 15, 2022 (physical)	978-1-64-827321-6
Chapter 1: Hirata Yōsuke's Soliloquy; Chapter 2: The Calm Before the Storm; Chapter 3: In-Class Voting; Chapter 4: The Difficulty of Saving; Chapter 5: Older Brother and Younger Sister; Chapter 6: Good and Evil; Chapter 7: Other Classes' Ideas; Chapter 8: The Expelled Students
11	May 25, 2019	978-4-04-065739-4	April 7, 2022 (digital); May 10, 2022 (physical)	978-1-64-827361-2
Chapter 1: Sakayanagi Arisu's Soliloquy; Chapter 2: The Teachers' Battle; Chapter 3: The Final Battle of The First Year; Chapter 4: Opponents; Chapter 5: What the Class is Lacking; Chapter 6: Good and Evil; Chapter 7: A Man's Tears; Chapter 8: Ayanokōji VS. Sakayanagi; Chapter 9: Class B VS. Class D; Chapter 10: The Line Between Winner and Loser
11.5	September 25, 2019	978-4-04-064007-5	May 12, 2022 (digital); June 28, 2022 (physical)	978-1-63858-102-4
Chapter 1: A Girl Peering at Herself in the Mirror; Chapter 2: Graduation Ceremony; Chapter 3: Hiyori Date; Chapter 4: Lost Lamb; Chapter 5: From Older Brother to Younger Sister; Chapter 6: Matsushita's Suspicions; Chapter 7: Adolescence About to Begin

==== Classroom of the Elite: Year 2 ====
A sequel light novel series titled Classroom of the Elite: Year 2 (ようこそ実力至上主義の教室へ 2年生編, Yōkoso Jitsuryoku Shijōshugi no Kyōshitsu e Ninensei-hen; lit. 'Welcome to the Classroom of Merito-Supremacism: Second-Year Students Edition') was published under the MF Bunko J imprint from January 2020 to November 2024, which concluded with twelve main volumes and three short story volumes. Seven Seas Entertainment has also licensed Year 2.

No.	Original release date	Original ISBN	English release date	English ISBN
1	January 24, 2020	978-4-04-064329-8	June 9, 2022 (digital); July 19, 2022 (physical)	978-1-63858-182-6
Chapter 1: Operating Behind the Scenes; Chapter 2: True Ability; Chapter 3: A New Stage; Chapter 4: These New First-Years are Nothing But Troublemakers; Chapter 5: Ichika's Test; Chapter 6: Class D and Class D; Chapter 7: Expulsion Approaches; Chapter 8: A Deepening Mystery
2	June 25, 2020	978-4-04-064664-0	July 21, 2022 (digital); August 30, 2022 (physical)	978-1-63858-337-0
Chapter 1: The White Room Student's Soliloquy; Chapter 2: Changing School Life; Chapter 3: Days Passing By; Chapter 4: Approaching Summer, Premonition of a Fierce Battle; Chapter 5: Battle of the First-Years and Third-Years; Chapter 6: Invitation; Chapter 7: The Calm Before the Storm
3	October 24, 2020	978-4-04-065942-8	September 8, 2022 (digital); November 22, 2022 (physical)	978-1-63858-642-5
Chapter 1: Nanase Tsubasa's Soliloquy; Chapter 2: Everyone Has Their Own Strategies; Chapter 3: The Curtain Rises on the Uninhabited Island Exam; Chapter 4: Traveling Companion; Chapter 5: What It Means to Like Someone; Chapter 6: Unseen Enemy; Chapter 7: The Aloof Child Prodigy of Class 2-D; Chapter 8: The First-Years on the Move; Chapter 9: Identity Revealed; Chapter 10: Seeds of Unrest
4	February 25, 2021	978-4-04-680166-1	December 29, 2022 (digital); February 7, 2023 (physical)	978-1-63858-817-7
Chapter 1: Amasawa Ichika's Soliloquy; Chapter 2: Secret Maneuvers; Chapter 3: Just Keep Going and Keep Quiet; Chapter 4: Fighting Against Solitude; Chapter 5: Under Siege: Kouenji VS. The Free Groups; Chapter 6: Each and Every Calculation; Chapter 7: The Man Called Tsukishiro; Chapter 8: Announcement of the Results
4.5	June 25, 2021	978-4-04-680516-4	March 30, 2023 (digital); May 9, 2023 (physical)	978-1-68579-639-6
Chapter 1: The Curtain Rises on a Fun Summer Vacation; Chapter 2: Ike and Komiya and...; Chapter 3: The Beginning of a Short-Lived Vacation; Chapter 4: Everyone's Holiday; Chapter 5: Everyone's Growth; Chapter 6: A Treasure Hunt of Girl Troubles; Chapter 7: A Connection to the Past; Chapter 8: When Hearts Touch
5	October 25, 2021	978-4-04-680846-2	May 18, 2023 (digital); July 11, 2023 (physical)	978-1-68579-653-2
Chapter 1: Chabashira Sae's Soliloquy; Chapter 2: Signs of an Approaching Storm; Chapter 3: Two Teachers and A Fated Special Exam; Chapter 4: Dark Clouds; Chapter 5: Ichinose Honami's Choice; Chapter 6: Ryuuen Kakeru's Choice; Chapter 7: Sakayanagi Arisu's Choice; Chapter 8: Horikita Suzune's Choice; Chapter 9: Farewell to the Past
6	February 25, 2022	978-4-04-681185-1	June 15, 2023 (digital); October 3, 2023 (physical)	978-1-63858-816-0
Chapter 1: Akito Miyake's Soliloquy; Chapter 2: The Price Of Victory; Chapter 3: An Unavoidable Path; Chapter 4: Still, We Gotta Do It!; Chapter 5: An Arrangement; Chapter 6: The Second Sports Festival; Chapter 7: The Guest; Chapter 8: The Arrival Of Autumn
7	June 24, 2022	978-4-04-681477-7	September 14, 2023 (digital); December 5, 2023 (physical)	978-1-68579-947-2
Chapter 1: Hasebe Haruka's Soliloquy; Chapter 2: Getting Ready for the Cultural Festival; Chapter 3: The Signal Fire of Rebellion; Chapter 4: A Love Letter; Chapter 5: Meeting the Day Before the Cultural Festival; Chapter 6: The Cultural Festival; Chapter 7: What Airi Left Behind; Chapter 8: Unseen Characters; Chapter 9: Those Working Behind the Scenes
8	October 25, 2022	978-4-04-681833-1	March 21, 2024 (digital); April 16, 2024 (physical)	979-8-88843-430-7
Chapter 1: Kanzaki Ryūji's Soliloquy; Chapter 2: Know Your Enemy, Know Yourself, and You Need Not Fear a Hundred Battles; Chapter 3: Self-Explanatory School Trip; Chapter 4: School Trip Day Two; Chapter 5: School Trip Day Three; Chapter 6: School Trip Day Four; Chapter 7: A Light Shining at the End of the Darkness
9	February 25, 2023	978-4-04-682213-0	July 4, 2024 (digital); August 6, 2024 (physical)	979-8-88843-871-8
Chapter 1: Nagumo Miyabi's Soliloquy; Chapter 2: Signs of Momentum; Chapter 3: A New Student Council Member; Chapter 4: How to Spend Time With People in Ichinose's Class; Chapter 5: How to Spend a Day Off; Chapter 6: Approaching the Special Exam; Chapter 7: The Expected and the Unexpected; Chapter 8: A Tinge of Anxiety
9.5	June 23, 2023	978-4-04-682566-7	November 7, 2024 (digital); December 10, 2024 (physical)	979-8-89160-225-0
Chapter 1: Irreplaceable Today; Chapter 2: Song of Loneliness; Chapter 3: Just A Hunch; Chapter 4: Casing Each Other Out; Chapter 5: Signs of Quiet; Chapter 6: Remaining Time; Chapter 7: Changing Relationships
10	October 25, 2023	978-4-04-682985-6	February 27, 2025 (digital); March 25, 2025 (physical)	979-8-89160-754-5
Chapter 1: Hashimoto Masayoshi's Soliloquy; Chapter 2: The Curtain Rises on the Third Semester of the Second Year; Chapter 3: Survival and Elimination Special Exam; Chapter 4: The Identity of the Sender; Chapter 5: Advice; Chapter 6: Game Changer; Chapter 7: Quadrilateral of Offense and Defense; Chapter 8: New Expulsion; Chapter 9: Harbinger of Awakening
11	February 24, 2024	978-4-04-683349-5	May 8, 2025 (digital); July 8, 2025 (physical)	979-8-89373-014-2
Chapter 1: Yamamura Miki's Soliloquy; Chapter 2: The Elusive Student-Teacher Meeting; Chapter 3: Social Group Camp; Chapter 4: A Request from Horikita and a Request from Ayanokouji; Chapter 5: A Curious Feeling That Something Is Out of Place; Chapter 6: Those Who Watch, Those Who Are Watched; Chapter 7: Quite Conclusion; Chapter 8: Sleepy Night; Chapter 9: Courage to Step Forward; Chapter 10: Who Is the Challenger?
12	July 25, 2024	978-4-04-683797-4	August 14, 2025 (digital); October 7, 2025 (physical)	979-8-89373-607-6
Chapter 1: Hoshinomiya Chie's Soliloquy; Chapter 2: The Unusual End-of-Year Special Exam; Chapter 3: What Ought to Be Finished; Chapter 4: The End-of-Year Special Exam Begins; Chapter 5: The Battle of the Vanguards; Chapter 6: Katsuragi's Counterattack; Chapter 7: Bitter Tears; Chapter 8: Ayanokouji's Scheme; Chapter 9: An Awaited Opponent; Chapter 10: The Trust Is...
12.5	November 25, 2024	978-4-04-684244-2	November 20, 2025 (digital); January 6, 2026 (physical)	979-8-89373-799-8
Chapter 1: Behind the Curtain; Chapter 2: Checking Each Answer; Chapter 3: Another Time; Chapter 4: Vacant Throne; Chapter 5: Anticipating; Chapter 6: Illusion; Chapter 7: Even After Graduation; Chapter 8: Parent and Child, Child and Parent; Chapter 9: Celebration; Chapter 10: The Promised Night; Chapter 11: Goals; Chapter 12: The Curtain Rises Once Again

==== Classroom of the Elite: Year 3 ====
A sequel light novel series titled Classroom of the Elite: Year 3 (ようこそ実力至上主義の教室へ 3年生編, Yōkoso Jitsuryoku Shijōshugi no Kyōshitsu e Sannensei-hen; lit. 'Welcome to the Classroom of Real Ability Supremacism Third-Year Students Edition') has been published under the MF Bunko J imprint since March 2025. Seven Seas Entertainment has also licensed Year 3.

No.	Original release date	Original ISBN	English release date	English ISBN
1	March 24, 2025	978-4-04-684635-8	April 2, 2026 (digital); May 5, 2026 (physical)	979-8-89561-933-9
Chapter 1: The End of the Everyday; Chapter 2: Chaos; Chapter 3: Making Sure; Chapter 4: The Start of a One-Year Period; Chapter 5: A Bystander's Vintage Point; Chapter 6: Mixture; Chapter 7: School Life in Class C; Chapter 8: Ayanokouji's Defeat; Chapter 9: Enemies and Allies; Chapter 10: What Lies Ahead
2	July 25, 2025	978-4-04-684976-2	August 6, 2026 (digital); September 1, 2026 (physical)	979-8-89765-900-5
Chapter 1: Nanase Tsubasa's Soliloquy; Chapter 2: Integrating; Chapter 3: A Gentle Exam; Chapter 4: Getting to Know Your Opponent; Chapter 5: The Pursuit of Knowledge; Chapter 6: Yamamura's Courage; Chapter 7: Fortune and Misfortune Are Interwind; Chapter 8: Observer; Chapter 9: One More Story Begins
3	November 25, 2025	978-4-04-685440-7	December 29, 2026 (physical)	979-8-89863-173-4
4	May 25, 2026	978-4-04-660156-8	March 23, 2027 (physical)	979-8-89863-911-2
5	October 23, 2026	978-4-04-660638-9		

=== Manga ===
==== Classroom of the Elite ====
A manga adaptation illustrated by Yuyu Ichino began serialization in Media Factory's Monthly Comic Alive magazine on January 27, 2016, and has been collected in twelve tankōbon volumes as of February 22, 2022. Seven Seas Entertainment has also licensed the manga, with the first volume released in February 2022.

No.	Original release date	Original ISBN	English release date	English ISBN
1	September 23, 2016	978-4-04-068550-2	February 22, 2022	978-1-63858-130-7
2	January 23, 2017	978-4-04-069039-1	May 10, 2022	978-1-63858-242-7
3	March 23, 2017	978-4-04-069120-6	August 16, 2022	978-1-63858-599-2
4	July 22, 2017	978-4-04-069303-3	November 1, 2022	978-1-63858-772-9
5	November 22, 2017	978-4-04-069532-7	February 21, 2023	978-1-63858-964-8
6	April 23, 2018	978-4-04-069747-5	May 23, 2023	978-1-68579-511-5
7	November 21, 2018	978-4-04-065321-1	August 22, 2023	978-1-68579-548-1
8	June 22, 2019	978-4-04-065704-2	November 7, 2023	979-8-88843-038-5
9	January 23, 2020	978-4-04-064297-0	February 6, 2024	979-8-88843-210-5
10	August 20, 2020	978-4-04-064789-0	April 30, 2024	979-8-88843-344-7
11	June 23, 2021	978-4-04-680382-5	August 13, 2024	979-8-88843-847-3
12	February 22, 2022	978-4-04-681125-7	November 5, 2024	979-8-88843-848-0

==== Classroom of the Elite: Horikita ====
A spin-off manga illustrated by Sakagaki and featuring Suzune Horikita was serialized in Monthly Comic Alive from June 2017 to May 2018, with its chapters collected in two tankōbon volumes. At Anime Expo 2022, Seven Seas Entertainment announced that they licensed the spin-off for English publication.

No.	Original release date	Original ISBN	English release date	English ISBN
1	November 22, 2017	978-4-04-069642-3	July 4, 2023	978-1-63858-850-4
2	June 23, 2018	978-4-04-069825-0	October 10, 2023	978-1-68579-934-2

==== Classroom of the Elite: Year 2 ====
A manga adaptation of the sequel light novel series illustrated by Shia Sasane was serialized in the Monthly Comic Alive magazine from December 25, 2021, to December 26, 2024. It was collected in four tankōbon volumes, and released from June 22, 2022, to January 22, 2025.

No.	Japanese release date	Japanese ISBN
1	June 22, 2022	978-4-04-681438-8
2	April 21, 2023	978-4-04-682455-4
3	February 22, 2024	978-4-04-683297-9
4	January 22, 2025	978-4-04-683297-9

==== Classroom of the Elite: Year 2 2nd Stage ====
A sequel manga to the manga adaptation of the Year 2 light novels illustrated by Hachi Komada began serialization in the Monthly Comic Alive magazine on January 27, 2025. The first tankōbon volume was released on August 21, 2025.

No.	Japanese release date	Japanese ISBN
1	August 21, 2025	978-4-04-811547-6
2	April 23, 2026	978-4-04-660011-0
3	December 22, 2026	978-4-04-660824-6

=== Anime ===
An anime television series adaptation aired from July 12 to September 27, 2017, on AT-X and other networks. Seiji Kishi and Hiroyuki Hashimoto directed the series at Lerche, Aoi Akashiro handled the series composition, Kazuaki Morita designed the characters, and Ryo Takahashi composed the music. The opening theme song is "Caste Room", performed by ZAQ, while the ending theme song is "Beautiful Soldier", performed by Minami. Crunchyroll streamed the series and Funimation streamed the English dub. iQIYI added the series onto its platform, Q3, and the Thai dub in 2022.

On February 21, 2022, it was announced that a sequel was in production, which was later revealed to have two seasons, with Lerche returning as the studio. The second season is directed by Yoshihito Nishōji, with Kishi and Hashimoto serving as chief directors, Hayato Kazano replacing Akashiro as screenwriter, and Morita returning as character designer. Masaru Yokoyama and Kana Hashiguchi replaced Takahashi, and served as music composers. The second season aired from July 4 to September 26, 2022. The opening theme song is "Dance in the Game", performed by ZAQ, while the ending theme song is "Hito Shibai" (人芝居), performed by Mai Fuchigami. The third season was originally scheduled for 2023, but was delayed, and eventually aired from January 3 to March 27, 2024. The third season's opening theme song is "Minor Piece", performed by ZAQ, while the ending theme song is "Konsei Dai Kakumei" (今世大革命; "The Great Revolution of this World"), performed by Yui Ninomiya.

A fourth season, covering the first semester of the Year 2 sequel light novel series, was announced during the "MF Bunko J Natsu no Gakuensai 2024" livestream event on September 1, 2024. It is produced by Lerche and directed by Noriyuki Nomata, with the rest of the staff and cast reprising their roles. The fourth season premiered on April 1, 2026. The fourth season's opening theme song is "MONSTER", performed by Eir Aoi, while the ending theme song is "Liar Veil" (ライアーヴェール), performed by ZAQ.

After the airing of the final episode of the fourth season, a fifth season was announced. It is set to premiere in 2027.
