= Asinaria =

Ancient Roman play by Plautus

- Written by: Plautus
- Characters: Demaenetus; Artemona; Argyrippus; Philaenium; Cleareta; Libanus; Leonida; Ass dealer (donkey merchant); Diabolus; Parasite (dependent) of Diabolus
- Setting: Athens, near Demaenetus's home

Asinaria ("The Comedy of Asses") is a comic play written in Latin by the Roman playwright Titus Maccius Plautus. In the play an Athenian gentleman, Demaenetus, tells his slave Libanus that he knows his son Argyrippus is having an affair with the prostitute Philaenium next door, and he asks him to try to find some money to pay for the affair. When by chance a stranger comes bringing money owed for some donkeys sold by Saurea, the steward of Demaenetus's wife, Libanus's fellow-slave Leonida pretends to be Saurea, and the two slaves trick the stranger into giving them the money. Argyrippus is given the money on condition that his father is to be allowed to enjoy the first night with the prostitute. But a jealous rival, Diabolus, snitches on Demaenetus to his wife Artemona, who storms to the brothel and prevents her husband from enjoying the girl as well.

The title Asinaria is short for asinaria fabula "the play about donkeys". Similar titles ending in the suffix -aria are found the plays Aulularia, Cistellaria, Mostellaria and Vidularia.

In his edition, de Melo suggests that this is a relatively early play, partly because it has few polymetric cantica. Another indication is that in line 307 there is a probable reference to the velites "light-armed soldiers", a special force which was first officially introduced in 211 BC.

The play is famous for containing the lines Lupus est homo homini, non homo, quom qualis sit non novit which has been translated as "A man is a wolf rather than a man to another man, when he hasn't yet found out what he's like"; facias ipse quod faciamus nobis suades "Practice yourself what you preach"; and necesse est facere sumptum qui quaerit lucrum "You must spend money to make money."

== Metrical scheme ==
Plautus's plays were divided up probably in Renaissance times into 5 acts. However, it is not thought that these divisions go back to Plautus's time, since no manuscript contains them before the 15th century. Also, the acts themselves do not always match the structure of the plays, which is more clearly shown by the changes from one metre to another.

In Plautus's plays a common pattern is to begin each section with iambic senarii (which were spoken without music), then a scene of music in various metres, and finally a scene in trochaic septenarii, which were apparently recited to the accompaniment of tibiae (a pair of reed pipes). Moore calls this the "ABC succession", where A = iambic senarii, B = other metres, C = trochaic septenarii.

The Asinaria has a very simple metrical scheme consisting of just nine metrical units. These could be divided as follows:

ABC, BCB, ABC

C. W. Marshall (2006), however, who sees the metrical sections as usually starting with iambic senarii, divides the play into just two sections as follows:

ABCBCB, ABC

In this play there is one short song of 11 lines in various cretic metres. Otherwise Asinaria resembles Miles Gloriosus in that only four metres are used: in the Asinaria, besides the usual iambic senarii and trochaic septenarii, there are two long passages of iambic septenarii and one short passage of iambic octonarii; in Miles, however, the fourth metre is anapaestic septenarii. The two passages of iambic septenarii both consist of the two cunning slaves' exuberant performance of their trick to obtain money.

Another feature of this play is the fact that the unaccompanied lines in iambic senarii form only a small portion of the play, compared with other plays. The whole of lines 127–745 is accompanied by or sung to music.

Like the Bacchides and Miles Gloriosus, the plot of Asinaria has a symmetrical structure:

- Demaenetus presents the problem

- Diabolus is thwarted

- Libanus and Leonida have fun

- Philaenium remains constant

- Libanus and Leonida have fun

- Diabolus is thwarted

- Demaenetus is humiliated

The metrical scheme of the play is as follows:

=== Looking for money ===
- Prologue; Act 1.1 (1–126): iambic senarii (124 lines)

A short prologue of 15 lines informs the audience that the play is adapted from one called Onāgos (Ὀναγός) "The Donkey-driver" by a certain Demophilus.
Demaenetus, an Athenian gentleman, leads his slave Libanus out onto the street. He first reassures Libanus that he is not going to punish him. He goes on to reveal that he is aware that his son Argyrippus is in love with a prostitute. He says he approves of this, and he orders Libanus and his fellow-slave Leonida to find some way of obtaining the money to pay for his son's affair. He suggests that they should get it by trickery from his wealthy wife Artemona and her steward Saurea.

- Act 1.2 (127–137): mainly cretic (11 lines)

When they have gone, a young man, apparently Argyrippus's rival Diabolus, comes out from the house next door, complaining bitterly that he has been shut out from seeing his mistress, despite having already given many presents.

- Act 1.2 (cont.)–2.2 (138–380): trochaic septenarii (240 lines)

The young man angrily threatens that he will punish the brothel-madam for her ingratitude. The brothel-madam, Cleareta, comes out and assures him that he will see her daughter as soon as he can raise some more money. She compares herself to a bird-catcher, who gives something to the clients to lure them so that she can better trap them. The young man says he will find the 20 minae for a year of his mistress's time, but there must be a strict contract that she is to be his alone. He goes off to the forum to see if he can raise the cash from friends.

Libanus enters, talking to himself, anxious because he has not yet thought of a plan to obtain the money. He listens secretly while his fellow-slave Leonida comes out talking excitedly, urgently looking for him. When Leonida sees Libanus he teases him by reminding him of the times when he was whipped. After much banter, Leonida reveals that when he was in the barber's shop, by chance he met a young man who was bringing money to be paid to the steward Saurea as the price of some donkeys sold earlier to a certain merchant. Leonida had pretended to the young man that he himself was Saurea, but the young man had insisted on meeting Demaenetus personally before handing over the money.

=== The trick works ===
- Act 2.3 (381–503): iambic septenarii (122 lines)

The merchant's agent comes along, looking for Saurea, and meets Libanus. When Libanus is asked to describe Saurea, he gives a description of Leonida instead. Leonida now approaches from the direction of the forum. Pretending to be Saurea, he imperiously reproaches Libanus for not obeying his orders, and questions him on various financial matters. But despite their play-acting the agent still insists on seeing Demaenetus before handing over the cash. They go off to the forum to find Demaenetus.

- Act 3.1 (504–544): trochaic septenarii (40 lines)

The prostitute Philaenium and her mother the brothel-madam Cleareta come out from the next-door house arguing. It appears that Philaenium loves Argyrippus, but Cleareta has forbidden her to talk to him, because he has not paid enough money. They go back inside.

- Act 3.2–3.3 (545–745): iambic septenarii (200 lines)

Leonida and Libanus arrive congratulating themselves on their cleverness at performing deceptions and recalling all the punishments they have received. Leonida tells Libanus that the trick was successful: Demaenetus had played his role perfectly and the agent had handed over the money to the supposed Saurea. Now they overhear Philaenium and Argyrippus as they come out from Cleareta's house and say a tearful goodbye. It appears that Diabolus is going to pay the 20 minae and keep Philaenium for his sole enjoyment for a year. Leonida and Libanus reveal themselves, but instead of handing over the money straightaway they first have fun teasing Argyrippus, and Libanus rides on him like a horse. Eventually Libanus hands over the money but adds that his father has demanded a night with Philaenium as a condition. The slaves depart home while Argyrippus takes the money into Cleareta's house.

=== Demaenetus is caught out ===
- Act 4.1–4.2 (746–827): iambic senarii (82 lines)

Diabolus and his "parasite" (hanger-on) appear. The parasite is carrying a written contract, with many clauses, which he reads out, stipulating that Diabolus is to have the exclusive use of Philaenium for a year. They go into Cleareta's house, but immediately come out again. Diabolus is talking to Demaenetus through the doorway, angrily reproaching him for his shameless behaviour. He instructs the parasite to go immediately and inform Demaenetus's wife Artemona, while he himself goes off home. – The first two lines of the next scene (828–9), if genuine, in which Argyrippus orders Cleareta's slaves to set up a table with wine, continue the iambic senarii.

- Act 5.1 (830–850): iambic octonarii (type b) (19 lines)

Demaenetus takes his place at the table next to Philaenium, while Argyrippus looks on disconsolately, but unable to prevent his father.

- Act 5.2 (851–947): trochaic septenarii (97 lines)

Meanwhile Artemona and the parasite come out of Demaenetus's house; he is telling her everything that has happened. He points out Demaenetus drinking with Philaenium and playing dice. Artemona and the parasite secretly listen as Demaenetus tells Philaenium he will bring her one of his wife's cloaks, and that her kisses are much sweeter than his wife's. Outraged, Artemona now comes forward and confronts her husband. As she angrily drags Demaenetus away, the parasite departs, saying that he will return the next day to see if he can arrange for Diabolus to share Philaenium with Argyrippus.

== Analysis ==
Asinaria belongs to the genre called fabula palliata, of Greek plays adapted for a Roman audience. This has caused a debate over Plautus' originality and creativity arguing contamination, while others point out that neither is redundant, or conflictual with Plautus' dramatic intentions.

=== Characters ===
The initial reversal of roles comes from Demenetus and his wife Artemona, as he is the dependent on her dowry and she implicitly plays the strict paterfamilias. Classically, the paterfamilias is the obstacle in his dependent son's relationship, while Plautus makes Artemona the obstacle in front of Demenetus' desire for Philaenium. Moreover, by introducing Demenetus in the role of a rival, Plautus disturbs the classical paradigm of the love triangle present in Miles Gloriosus (play) and Pseudolus.

Plautus takes great care to enrich his characters beyond their obvious roles. In this play, Demenetus is ostensibly cast as a senex, but he denies both the audience and his slave Libanus in their expectations to get angry over his son's affair with a prostitute. The play takes an unexpected turn with his stipulation to spend one night with Philaenium. Thus Demenetus goes beyond both the strict father and the avuncular role of senex and becomes involved in a love triangle.

=== Themes ===
The role of parents in their children's lives is represented through various perspectives in the play. With Artemona as the obstacle, Demaenetus as the dependent is cast in a traditionally adolescent role. His relation with Argyrippus is then set against Cleareta's with her daughter, both having lost the respect traditionally due to this position, one by a lack of funds and the second by her occupation. They are comparable in their appeal of filial piety to indulge their vices of lust and greed, respectively. The result is a materialistic abuse of conventional rules.

The power of money is apparent in the now familiar theme of moral corruption as Demaenetus is further infantilized by his lack of moral strength. Moreover, Argyrippus and Philaenium are humiliated and made to beg and offer favours to Leonida and Libanus for the twenty minae. The theme of materialism pervades the play, turning Asinaria into a defense of the ethical structure of the ancient patriarchal family than against money and passion.

== Translations ==
- Translation by Henry Thomas Riley, published in 1852
- Translation by Paul Nixon, published in 1916
- Translation by John Henderson, published in 2006
- Translation by Wolfang de Melo, published in 2011
