= Studio Hibari =

Japanese animation studio

Studio Hibari, Co., Ltd.

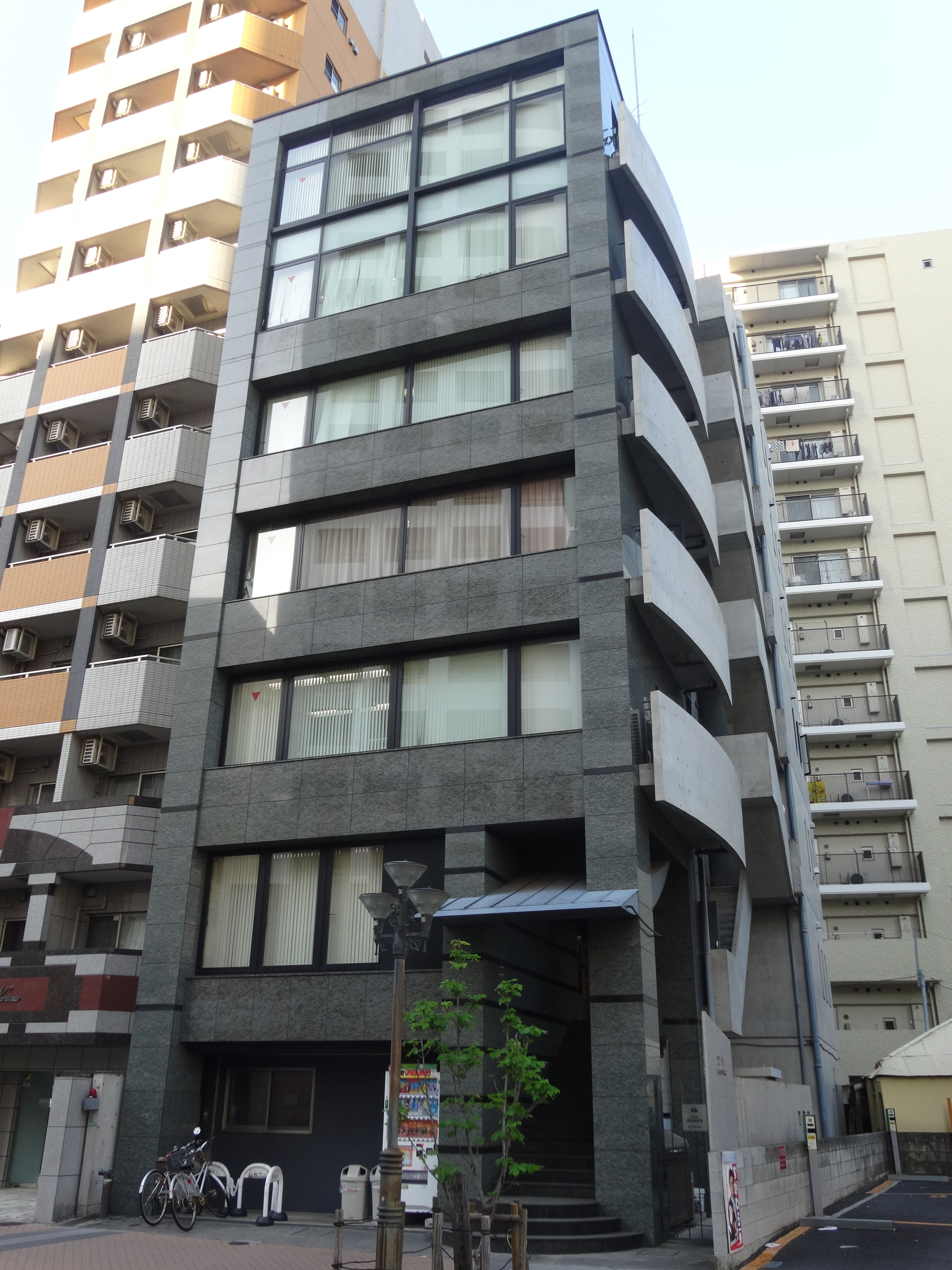
- Kouon Building in Nerima, where Studio Hibari's head office is located
- Native name: 株式会社スタジオ雲雀
- Romanized name: Kabushiki-gaisha Sutajio Hibari
- Type: Kabushiki gaisha
- Industry: Japanese animation
- Founded: July 1979; 47 years ago
- Founder: Sachiko Mitsunobu; Hiroyoshi Mitsunobu
- Headquarters: Toyomakita, Nerima, Tokyo, Japan
- Key people: Seiji Mitsunobu (CEO); Sachiko Mitsunobu (director); Hiroyoshi Mitsunobu (director)
- Total equity: ¥ 10,000,000
- Number of employees: 100
- Divisions: Photography Department (撮影部); Vietnam Studio (2009–2022); Osaka Studio; Sao Sang Studio; Shanghai Studio
- Subsidiaries: Larx Entertainment; Hibari Vietnam; Alouette Studio
- Website: www.st-hibari.co.jp/en/

Lerche
- Native name: ラルケ
- Romanized name: Raruke
- Industry: Japanese animation
- Founded: 2011; 15 years ago
- Parent: Studio Hibari (brand owner)
- Website: www.lerche.jp

Hibari Vietnam Co., Ltd
- Industry: Japanese animation
- Founded: 2009; 17 years ago (division); December 2022; 3 years ago (incorporated)
- Headquarters: Ho Chi Minh City, Vietnam
- Key people: Seiji Mitsunobu (CEO)
- Total equity: ₫ 1,000,000,000
- Number of employees: 90
- Parent: Studio Hibari

Alouette Studio Inc.
- Type: Kabushiki-gaisha
- Industry: Audio and music production
- Founded: June 2012; 14 years ago
- Headquarters: Wasedamachi, Shinjuku, Tokyo, Japan
- Key people: Seiji Mitsunobu
- Number of employees: 10
- Parent: Studio Hibari
- Website: www.az-creative.com

Studio Hibari, Co., Ltd. (Japanese: 株式会社スタジオ雲雀, Hepburn: Kabushiki-gaisha Sutajio Hibari) is a Japanese animation studio founded in 1979, in Ōizumi, Gunma Prefecture.

== History ==
Studio Hibari was founded in July 1979 in Ōizumi by former Tsuchida Production cel-colorist Sachiko Mitsunobu and her husband, anime director Hiroyoshi Mitsunobu. In 1985, the couple's son, Seiji, was appointed managing director of the company. In 1998, the head office moved from Ōizumi to Nerima Ward in Tokyo. The next year, the studio debuted its first television animation production, Sensual Phrase. In 2002, the company moved offices to accommodate for the expansion of departments in order to integrate them into the company's production system, and Seiji became president of the company; and a year later set up its own 3DCG department. Due to an increase in employees, the digital sections (namely coloring, compositing, and 3D) were moved to another building separate from the head office. The 3D department was incorporated into a separate studio in 2006, which became Larx Entertainment, a wholly owned subsidiary. The next year all of the departments were reallocated into a single building, which has served as the studio's headquarters since. In 2009, the studio opened up an office in Ho Chi Minh City, Vietnam which became Larx Entertainment subsidiary Sao Sang Design; and in 2011, Lerche was established as an animation brand by which most of Studio Hibari's production succeeding its creation would be produced under. The company again expanded in 2020 by taking in studio IngresA (a subsidiary of Ingres) in Osaka and reorganizing the company as a branch studio named Studio Hibari Osaka Studio. Music and sound production company AZ Creative is also a part of the Studio Hibari group. In 2022, Hibari's Vietnam branch, Sao Sang Design, was incorporated as its own subsidiary entity as Hibari Vietnam. As of 2025, AZ Creative rebranded as Alouette Studio.

The studio also maintains a relatively strong relationship with Qixie Studio (formerly Shanghai M.C.C) in China. Producer Li Jiawen (李佳雯), the founder of Qixie Studio and Shanghai M.C.C, moved to Japan from China after college due to interest in Japanese animation, and in the late 2000s he joined Studio Hibari. At the time, Hibari had been looking to open its eventual Hibari Vietnam office; and they had begun accepting foreigners for production jobs. At some point, Li questioned whether he should move up in the company to a production desk (he was working as a production assistant) or if he should go back to China; and eventually, Studio Hibari's president (Seiji Mitsunobu) heard about Li's idea and stated that he would support Li in cultivating talent. After that, Li left the studio and went to establish Shanghai M.C.C. Since 2023, members of Li's studio have been credited under both "Laplace Animation" and "Hibari Shanghai" (雲雀上海).

== Works ==
=== Television series ===
Year	Title	Director(s)	Brand	Source	Eps	Ref(s)
1999−2000	Sensual Phrase	Hiroko Tokita	Hibari	Manga	44	
2000−2001	Taro the Space Alien	Yorifusa Yamaguchi	Hibari	Manga	24	
2001−2002	Tantei Shounen Kageman	Yorifusa Yamaguchi	Hibari	Manga	39	
2002	Happy Lesson	Iku Suzuki	Hibari	Manga	13	
2002−2005	Mirmo!	Kenichi Kasai	Hibari	Manga	172	
2003	Lime-iro Senkitan	Iku Suzuki	Hibari	Video game	13	
2003	Happy Lesson Advance	Iku Suzuki	Hibari	Manga	13	
2004−2005	Grandpa Danger	Yorifusa Yamaguchi	Hibari	Manga	51	
2004–2006	Duel Masters Charge	Waruo Suzuki	Hibari	Manga/Card game	52	
2004−2007	Major	Toshinori Fukushima	Hibari	Manga	78	
2005	Happy Seven (with Trinet Entertainment)	Tsutomu Yabuki	Hibari	Light novel	13	
2005–2006	Duel Masters: Sacred Lands	Mickey Corcoran	Hibari	Manga/Card game	39	
2006	Gargoyle of Yoshinaga House (with Trinet Entertainment)	Iku Suzuki	Hibari	Light novel	13	
2006	Tsuyokiss (with Trinet Entertainment)	Shinichiro Kimura	Hibari	Visual novel	12	
2006	Nerima Daikon Brothers	Shinichi Watanabe	Hibari	Manga	12	
2006	Kashimashi: Girl Meets Girl	Nobuaki Nakanishi	Hibari	Manga	12	
2006–2007	Sumomomo Momomo	Nobuaki Nakanishi	Hibari	Manga	22	
2007	Venus Versus Virus	Shinichiro Kimura	Hibari	Manga	12	
2007	Moonlight Mile	Iku Suzuki	Hibari	Manga	26	
2008−2009	Net Ghost PiPoPa	Shinichiro Kimura	Hibari	Original work	51	
2009	Charger Girl Ju-den Chan	Shinichiro Kimura	Hibari	Manga	12	
2009	Yumeiro Patissiere (produced by Pierrot)	Iku Suzuki	Hibari	Manga	50	
2009	Weiß Survive	Iku Suzuuki	Hibari	Multi-media project	16	
2009–2010	Weiß Survive R	Kenji Seto	Hibari	Multi-media project	12	
2010	Yumeiro Patissiere SP Professional (produced by Pierrot)	Iku Suzuki	Hibari	Manga	13	
2011	Maji de Watashi ni Koi Shinasai!	Keitaro Motonaga	Lerche	Visual novel	12	
2013	Danganronpa: The Animation	Seiji Kishi	Lerche	Visual novel	13	
2013	Unbreakable Machine-Doll	Kinji Yoshimoto	Lerche	Light novel	12	
2014	Re:_Hamatora	Seiji Kishi	Lerche	Original work	12	
2015	Assassination Classroom	Seiji Kishi	Lerche	Manga	22	
2015	Rampo Kitan: Game of Laplace	Seiji Kishi	Lerche	Original work	11	
2015	Monster Musume	Tatsuya Yoshihara	Lerche	Manga	12	
2015	School-Live!	Masaomi Andō	Lerche	Manga	12	
2016	Assassination Classroom: Second Season	Seiji Kishi	Lerche	Manga	25	
2016	Undefeated Bahamut Chronicle	Masaomi Andō	Lerche	Light novel	12	
2016	Danganronpa 3: The End of Hope's Peak High School	Seiji Kishi (chief); Daiki Fukuoka	Lerche	Visual novel	24	
2016	Magical Girl Raising Project	Hiroyuki Hashimoto	Lerche	Light novel	12	
2017	Clean Freak! Aoyama-kun	Kazuya Ichikawa	Hibari	Manga	12	
2017	Scum's Wish	Masaomi Andō	Lerche	Manga	12	
2017	Classroom of the Elite	Seiji Kishi; Hiroyuki Hashimoto	Lerche	Light novel	12	
2017	Konohana Kitan	Hideki Okamoto	Lerche	Manga	12	
2017	Kino's Journey -the Beautiful World- the Animated Series	Tomohisa Taguchi	Lerche	Light novel	12	
2018	Hakumei and Mikochi	Masaomi Andō	Lerche	Manga	12	
2018	Seven Senses of the Reunion	Yoshihito Nishōji	Lerche	Light novel	12	
2018	Asobi Asobase	Seiji Kishi	Lerche	Manga	12	
2018−2020	Radiant	Seiji Kishi; Daiki Fukuoka	Lerche	French comic	42	
2019	Astra Lost in Space	Masaomi Andō	Lerche	Manga	12	
2019	Given	Hikaru Yamaguchi	Lerche	Manga	11	
2020–2025	Toilet-Bound Hanako-kun	Masaomi Andō	Lerche	Manga	36	
2021	Idoly Pride	Yū Kinome	Lerche	Multi-media project	12	
2021	Rumble Garanndoll	Masaomi Andō	Lerche	Original work	12	
2022	Classroom of the Elite 2nd Season	Seiji Kishi (chief); Hiroyuki Hashimoto (chief); Yoshihito Nishōji	Lerche	Light novel	13	
2023	World Dai Star	Yū Kinome	Lerche	Multi-media project	12	
2023–2024	After-School Hanako-kun	Masaki Kitamura	Lerche	Manga	8	
2023–2024	High Card	Junichi Wada	Hibari	Multi-media project	25	
2024	Classroom of the Elite 3rd Season	Seiji Kishi (chief); Hiroyuki Hashimoto (chief); Yoshihito Nishōji	Lerche	Light novel	13	
2025	Tougen Anki	Ato Nonaka	Hibari	Manga	24	
2026	Classroom of the Elite 4th Season Year 2	Noriyuki Nomata	Lerche	Light novel	16	
2026	Kujima: Why Sing, When You Can Warble?	Noriyuki Nomata; Shinichiro Kimura	Hibari	Manga	12	
2027	Ore to Yu Nii!	Noriko Hashimoto	Hibari	Manga	TBA	
2027	Nue's Exorcist	Hiroyuki Hashimoto	Hibari	Manga	TBA	
2027	Classroom of the Elite 5th Season Year 2	Noriyuki Nomata	Lerche	Light novel	TBA	

=== OVA/ONAs ===
Year	Title	Director(s)	Brand	Source	Eps	Ref(s)
1991	Izumo (with Grouper Production)	Eiichi Yamamoto	Hibari	Manga	1 (#2)	
2004	Raimuiro Senkitan: The South Island Dream Romantic Adventure	Iku Suzuki	Hibari	Video game	2	
2004	Netrun-mon	Poyoyon Rock	Hibari	Original work	1	
2006	Kashimashi: Girl Meets Girl	Nobuaki Nakanishi	Hibari	Manga	1	
2007	Sumomomo Momomo	Nobuaki Nakanishi	Hibari	Manga	1	
2007	Keitai Shoujo	Tsutomu Yabuki	Hibari	Visual novel	5	
2008	Hoshi no Umi no Amuri	Yoshitomo Yonetai	Hibari	Original work	3	
2009	Isshoni Training: Training with Hinako	Iku Suzuki	Hibari	Original work	1	
2010	Isshoni Sleeping: Sleeping with Hinako	Shinichirou Kimura	Hibari	Original work	1	
2010	Isshoni Training 026: Bathtime with Hinako & Hiyoko	Shinichirou Kimura	Hibari	Original work	1	
2010	Yumeiro Patissiere: Mune Kyun Tropical Island!	Iku Suzuki	Hibari	Manga	1	
2011	Carnival Phantasm	Seiji Kishi	Lerche	Manga	16	
2011	Fate/Prototype	Seiji Kishi	Hibari	Original work	1	
2013	Land of the Lustrous PV	Akiyo Oohashi	Hibari	Manga	1	
2013−2014	Unbreakable Machine-Doll	Seiji Kishi	Lerche	Light novel	6	
2015−2016	Monster Strike	Kazuya Ichikawa	Hibari	Mobile game	51	
2016	Monster Strike: Mermaid Rhapsody	Toshiya Niidome	Hibari	Mobile game	1	
2016	Monster Strike: An Encore of Continuance- Pandora's Box	Kazuya Ichikawa	Hibari	Mobile game	1	
2016−2017	Monster Musume	Tatsuya Yoshihara	Lerche	Manga	2	
2016−2017	Koro Sensei Quest	Yoshito Nishouji	Lerche	Manga	12	
2020−2021	Ninjala (with Domerica)		Hibari	Video game	5	
2022	Tekken: Bloodline (with Larx Entertainment)	Yoshikazu Miyao	Hibari	Video game	6	

=== Films ===
Year	Title	Director(s)	Brand	Source	Ref(s)
2005	Duel Masters: Curse of the Deathphoenix	Warurou Suzuki	Hibari	Video game	
2010	Junod	Shinichirou Kimura	Hibari	Original work	
2015	Fw:Hamatora	Masaomi Andou	Lerche	Original work	
2016	Assassination Classroom the Movie: 365 Days	Seiji Kishi	Lerche	Manga	
2020	Given	Hikaru Yamaguchi	Lerche	Manga	
2020	The Stranger by the Shore	Akiyo Oohashi	Hibari	Manga	
2026	Assassination Classroom the Movie: Our Time	Masaki Kitamura	Lerche	Manga	

=== Video games ===
- Dragon Master Silk (1997)
- Gotcha Force (2003)
- Persona 4 (2008) Contributed Cutscenes with A-1 Pictures Inc.
- Shining Force Feather (2009)
- Disgaea D2: A Brighter Darkness (2013)
- Danganronpa Another Episode: Ultra Despair Girls (2014)
