= Yui Ninomiya =

Japanese voice actress and singer

- 二ノ宮 ゆい
- Born: September 6, 2001 (age 24); Kanagawa Prefecture, Japan
- Occupations: Voice actress; singer
- Years active: 2018–present
- Label: Lantis

Yui Ninomiya (二ノ宮ゆい, Ninomiya Yui; born September 6, 2001) is a Japanese voice actress and singer known for voicing protagonist Ema Hinata in Aikatsu Friends!. She released her first studio album, Ai toka Kanjō, in January 2020.

== Personal life ==
On February 27, 2024, it was announced that Ninomiya would be going on hiatus due to health issues. She resumed her activities on August 31, 2024. On September 30, 2024, it was announced that Ninomiya left Horipro.

== Filmography ==
=== Anime ===
List of voice performances in anime
Year	Title	Role	Notes	Source
2018	Aikatsu Friends!	Ema Hinata		
2019	Aikatsu on Parade!	Ema Hinata		
2020	Micchiri Wanko! Animation	Rui		
2020	Peter Grill and the Philosopher's Time	Luvelia Sanctos		
2020	Kaoru no Taisetsu na Mono	Satoru		
2021	Aikatsu Planet!	Pop Melon Crepe		
2022	In the Land of Leadale	Mimily		
2022	Peter Grill and the Philosopher's Time: Super Extra	Luvelia Sanctos		

=== Anime films ===
List of voice performances in anime films
Year	Title	Role	Notes	Source
2022	Idol Bu Show	Erina Isayama		
2022	Aikatsu Planet! The Movie	Pop Melon Crepe		
2022	Guardy Girls	Silvia		

== Discography ==
=== Studio albums ===
"Ai toka Kanjō" (愛とか感情, Love, Emotions, etc.)

- Released: 2020-01-15
- Format: CD
- Label: Lantis
